= Panda District =

Coordinates: 24.065°S 34.728°E

Panda
- District
- Panda District on the map of Mozambique
- Country: Mozambique
- Province: Inhambane
- Capital: Panda

Area
  - Total: 6,852 km^{2} (2,646 sq mi)

Population (2007 census)
  - Total: 47,946
  - Density: 6.997/km^{2} (18.12/sq mi)

Panda District is a district of Inhambane Province in south-east Mozambique. Its principal town is Panda. The district is located in the northwestern part of the province and borders Funhalouro District in the north, Homoine District in the east, Inharrime District in the south, and Chibuto and Manjacaze Districts of Gaza Province in the west. The area of the district is 6,852 square kilometres (2,646 mi^{2}). It has a population of 47.946 as of 2007.

== Geography ==
The Changane River, a left tributary of the Limpopo River, makes the western border of the district and of Inhambane province. The Nhatócue River is the biggest river flowing from west to east through the district.

The climate is tropical arid, with the annual rainfall being 750 millimetres (30 in).

== History ==
The name of the district is related to the name of the son of a tribal chief Mabuntse Ndindane, recognized as an important figure in resistance against colonization. The name was already used by the Portuguese for the area in the 1860s.

== Demographics ==
As of 2005, 42% of the population of the district was younger than 15 years. 39% spoke Portuguese. The predominant language in the district was Chopi. 64% were analphabetic, mostly women.

== Administrative divisions ==
The district is divided into three postos, Panda, Mawayela, and Urrene, which in total include eight localities.

== Economy ==
About 1% of the households in the district have access to electricity.

=== Agriculture ===
In the district, there are 11,000 farms which have on average 2.4 hectares (0.0093 mi^{2}) of land. The main agricultural products are corn, cassava, cowpea, peanut, sweet potatoes, rice, and cotton.

=== Transportation ===
The total length of the roads in Panda District is 399 kilometres (248 mi). Two of then, Panda to Inhassune and Panda to Mubique, have a status of a national road.
