= Funhalouro District =

Coordinates: 23.093°S 34.384°E

Funhalouro
- District
- Funhalouro District on the map of Mozambique
- Country: Mozambique
- Province: Inhambane
- Capital: Funhalouro

Area
  - Total: 13,653 km^{2} (5,271 sq mi)

Population (2007 census)
  - Total: 37,925
  - Density: 2.7778/km^{2} (7.1944/sq mi)

Funhalouro District is a district of Inhambane Province in south-east Mozambique. Its principal town is Funhalouro. The district is located at the west of the province, and borders with Mabote District in the north, Inhassoro District in the northeast, Massinga and Morrumbene Districts in the east, Homoine District in the southeast, Inharrime District in the south, and with Chigubo District of Gaza Province in the west. The area of the district is 13,653 square kilometres (5,271 mi^{2}). It has a population of 37.925 as of 2007.

== Geography ==
The Changane River, a left tributary of the Limpopo River, makes the western border of the district and of Inhambane province. This is the only big river in the district.

The climate is tropical semi-arid, with the annual rainfall varying between 500 millimetres (20 in) and 800 millimetres (31 in).

== History ==
The area was traditionally populated by the Mazive people. In 1942, it was split between Massinga Circunscrição and newly established Vilanculo Circunscrição, a type of administrative unit used in Portuguese colonies in Africa. The Mazive lands were administered from Posto de Funhalouro, which belonged to Vilanculo Circunscrição. In July 1986, a new administrative division of Mozambique was introduced, and Funhalouro District was established.

== Administrative divisions ==
The district is divided into two postos, Funhalouro (four localities) and Tome (two localities).

== Demographics ==
As of 2005, 42% of the population of the district was younger than 15 years. 21% did speak Portuguese. The Roman Catholic Church was the predomininant church. The population was predominantly speaking Chopi language. 79% were analphabetic, mostly women.

== Economy ==
=== Agriculture ===
The district has 500,000 hectares (1,900 mi^{2}) of agricultural lands, ow which 20,000 hectares (77 mi^{2}) are in active use. The main agricultural products are peanuts, millet, sorghum, cassava, cotton, and cashew.

=== Transportation ===
The total length of the roads in Funhalouro District is 878 kilometres (546 mi).
