= Manjacaze District =

Coordinates: 24°42′42″S 33°52′58″E

Manjacaze
- District
- Manjacaze District on the map of Mozambique
- Country: Mozambique
- Province: Gaza
- Capital: Manjacaze

Area
  - Total: 3,797 km^{2} (1,466 sq mi)

Population (2007 census)
  - Total: 166,488
  - Density: 43.85/km^{2} (113.6/sq mi)

Manjacaze District is a district of Gaza Province in southwestern Mozambique. Its principal town is Manjacaze. The district is located at the south of the province, and borders with Panda District of Inhambane Province in the north, Inharrime and Zavala Districts of Inhambane Province in the east, Xai-Xai District in the south, and Chibuto District in the west. In the southeast, the district is limited by the Indian Ocean. The area of the district is 3,797 square kilometres (1,466 mi^{2}). It has a population of 166,488 as of 2007.

== Geography ==
The Changane River, a major left tributary of the Limpopo River, marks the border of the district with Chibuto District. Another major river is the Mangonhane River, a tributary of the Inharrime River. There are 63 lakes in the district, the biggest one is Lake Nhambavale.

The climate is tropical dry in the interior, and tropical humid at the coast. The annual rainfall varies between 400 millimetres (16 in) and 950 millimetres (37 in).

== Demographics ==
As of 2005, 45% of the population of the district was younger than 15 years. 49% of the population spoke Portuguese. The most common mother tongue among the population was Tsonga. 53% were illiterate, mostly women.

== Administrative divisions ==
The district is divided into seven postos, Manjacaze (two localities), Chidenguele (four localities), Nguzene (three localities), Chibonzane (three localities), Macuacua (two localities), Madzucane (three localities), and Chalala (two localities).

== Economy ==
3% of the households in the district have access to electricity.

=== Agriculture ===
In the district, there are 38,000 farms which have on average 2.4 hectares (0.0093 mi^{2}) of land. The main agricultural products are corn, cassava, cowpea, peanut, sweet potato, and rice. Population of cattle, pigs, sheep, and goats was steadily growing prior to 2005.

=== Transportation ===
The road network in the district includes a stretch of the national road EN1 42 kilometres (26 mi) long, connecting Maputo and Inhambane, as well as 274 kilometres (170 mi) of secondary roads.
