= Chibuto District =

Coordinates: 24.683°S 33.533°E

Chibuto
- District
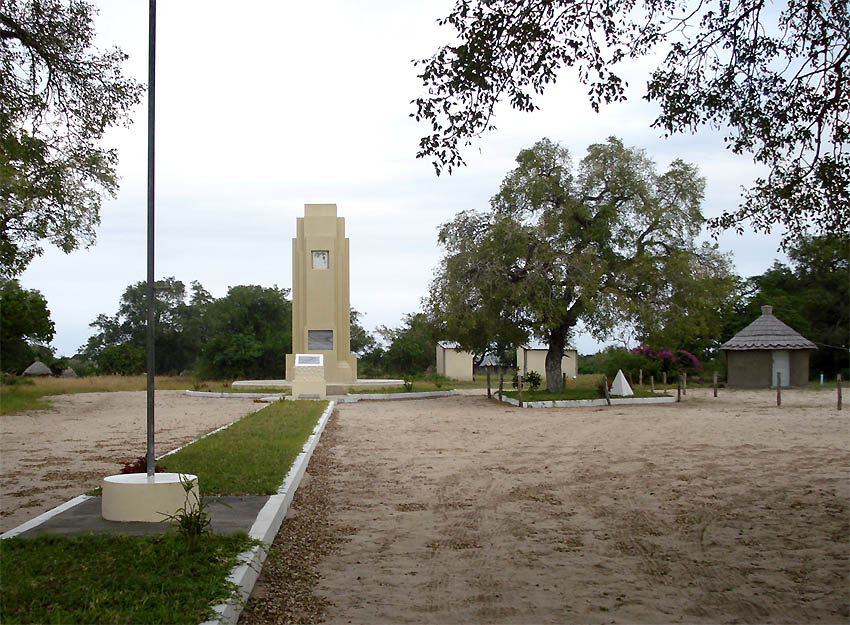
- Monument to Gungunhana in Chaimite

- Chibuto District on the map of Mozambique
- Country: Mozambique
- Province: Gaza
- Capital: Chibuto

Area
  - Total: 5,653 km^{2} (2,183 sq mi)

Population (2007 census)
  - Total: 197,214
  - Density: 34.89/km^{2} (90.36/sq mi)

Chibuto District is a district of Gaza Province in south-western Mozambique. Its principal town is Chibuto. The district is located at the south of the province, and borders with Chigubo District in the north, Panda District of Inhambane Province in the east, Manjacaze District in the southeast, Xai-Xai District in the south, Chókwè District in the southwest, and Guijá District in the west. The area of the district is 5,653 square kilometres (2,183 mi^{2}). It has a population of 197,214 as of 2007.

== Geography ==
The Changane River, a major left tributary of the Limpopo River, makes a border of the district with Inhambane Province. The area of the district belongs to the drainage basin of the Limpopo, though rivers in the interior are seasonal.

The climate is tropical arid, with the annual rainfall varying between 400 millimetres (16 in) and 600 millimetres (24 in).

== Demographics ==
As of 2005, 43% of the population of the district was younger than 15 years. 37% of the population spoke Portuguese. The most common mothertongue among the population was Tsonga. 54% were analphabetic, mostly women.

== Administrative divisions ==
The district is divided into six postos, Chibuto (two localities), Alto Changane (two localities), Godide (two localities), Malehice (six localities), Chaimite (three localities), and Changanine (two localities).

== Economy ==
3% of the households in the district have access to electricity.

=== Agriculture ===
In the district, there are 33,000 farms which have on average 2.2 hectares (0.0085 mi^{2}) of land. The main agricultural products are corn, cassava, cowpea, peanut, sweet potato, and rice. Population of cattle, pigs, sheep, and goats was steadily growing prior to 2005.

=== Transportation ===
There is a road network in the district which includes a stretch of the national road EN1, connecting Maputo and Inhambane, as well as 318 kilometres (198 mi) of secondary roads, mainly connecting Chibuto with the rest of the district.
