= Jangamo District =

Coordinates: 24.114°S 35.318°E

Jangamo
- District
- Jangamo District on the map of Mozambique
- Country: Mozambique
- Province: Inhambane
- Capital: Jangamo

Area
  - Total: 1,294 km^{2} (500 sq mi)

Population (2007 census)
  - Total: 93,681
  - Density: 72.40/km^{2} (187.5/sq mi)

Jangamo District is a district of Inhambane Province in south-east Mozambique. Its principal town is Jangamo. The district is located in the south of the province, and borders with Homoine District in the north and with Inharrime District in the south and in the west. In the east, the district is bounded by the Indian Ocean. The area of the district is 1,294 square kilometres (500 mi^{2}). It has a population of 93,681 as of 2007.

== Geography ==
The principal rivers in the district are the Mutamba River and the Joba River, both flowing into the Inhambane Bay of the Indian Ocean. Other rivers are seasonal and flow only during the rainy season. There are 11 lakes in the district, some of them permanent, and others only existing during the rainy season.

The climate of the district is tropical humid, with the annual rainfall varying between 800 millimetres (31 in) and 1,400 millimetres (55 in).

== History ==
The name "Jangamo" originates from colonial times and is attributed to a misunderstood "ja ngamu" in Bitonga, meaning "this is" in a misunderstood Bitonga sentence.

== Administrative divisions ==
The district is divided into two postos, Jangamo (three localities) and Cumbana (two localities).

== Demographics ==
As of 2005, 45% of the population of the district was younger than 15 years. 49% of the population spoke Portuguese. The most common mothertongue among the population was Chopi. 48% were analphabetic, mostly women.

== Economy ==
Less than 1% of the households in the district have access to electricity.

=== Agriculture ===
In the district, there are 23,000 farms which have on average 1.1 hectares (0.0042 mi^{2}) of land. The main agricultural products are corn, cassava, peanut, and rice.

=== Transportation ===
There is a road network in the district which includes a 58 kilometres (36 mi) stretch of the national road EN1, crossing the eastern part of the district.
