= Morrumbene District =

Coordinates: 23.665°S 35.337°E

Morrumbene
- District
- Morrumbene District on the map of Mozambique
- Country: Mozambique
- Province: Inhambane
- Capital: Morrumbene

Area
  - Total: 2,608 km^{2} (1,007 sq mi)

Population (2007 census)
  - Total: 124,471
  - Density: 47.73/km^{2} (123.6/sq mi)

Morrumbene District is a district of Inhambane Province in south-east Mozambique. Its principal town is Morrumbene. The district is located at the east of the province and borders with Massinga District in the north, Homoine District in the south, and with Funhalouro District in the west. In the east, the district is bounded by the Indian Ocean. The area of the district is 2,608 square kilometres (1,007 mi^{2}). In terms of the area, this is the biggest district of Inhambane Province. It has a population of 124,471 as of 2007.

== Geography ==
There are six small rivers in the district which flow throughout the whole year.

The climate is tropical arid in the interior, with the annual rainfall varying between 650 millimetres (26 in) and 750 millimetres (30 in), and tropical humid at the coast, with the annual rainfall being 1,200 millimetres (47 in).

== History ==
In colonial times, the area was known as Rumba-Nyone, which was later transformed into Morrumbene.

== Demographics ==
As of 2005, 42% of the population of the district was younger than 15 years. 50% did speak Portuguese. The population was predominantly speaking Chopi language. 53% were analphabetic, mostly women.

== Administrative divisions ==
The district is divided into two postos, Mocodoene and Morrumbene, which in total include six localities.

== Economy ==
In 2005, 1% of the households in the district had electricity.

=== Agriculture ===
In 2005, the district had 27,000 farms exploiting on average the area of 1.4 hectares (0.0054 mi^{2}) each. The main agricultural products are maize, cassava, cowpea, peanuts, sweet potatoes, cotton, and rice.

=== Transportation ===
There is a road network in the district which includes about 200 kilometres (120 mi) of unpaved secondary roads. The main national road, EN1, crosses the eastern part of the district, passing the town of Morrumbene.
