= Vilanculos District =

Coordinates: 22.0000°S 35.3167°E

Vilanculos
- District
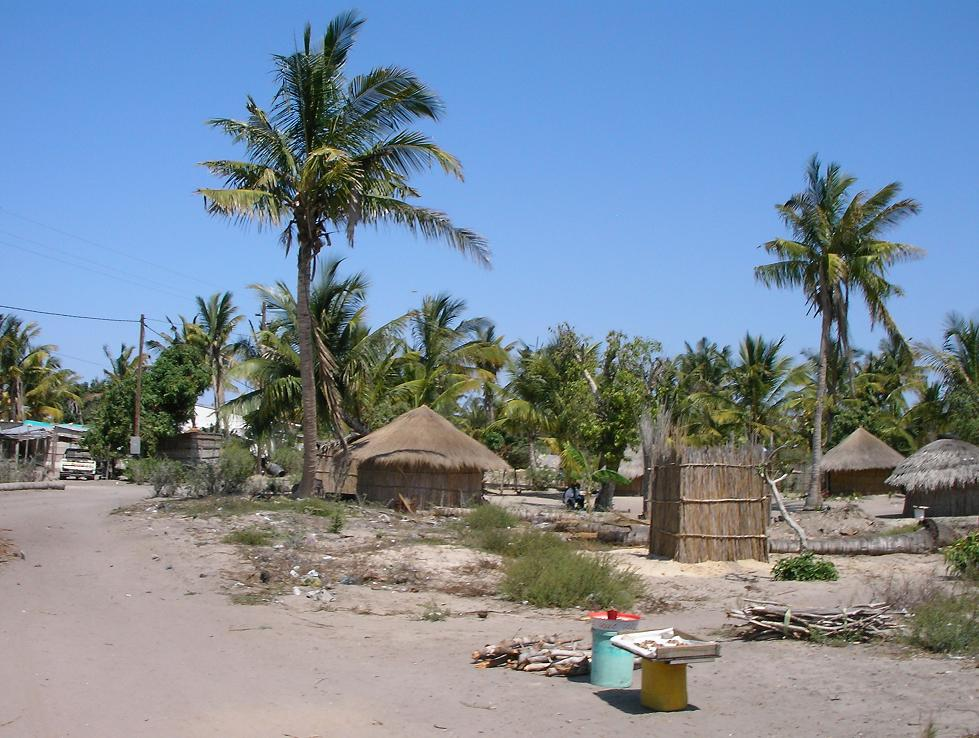
- Traditional buildings in Vilankulo

- Vilanculos District on the map of Mozambique
- Country: Mozambique
- Province: Inhambane
- Capital: Vilankulo

Area
  - Total: 5,867 km^{2} (2,265 sq mi)

Population (2007 census)
  - Total: 135,710
  - Density: 23.13/km^{2} (59.91/sq mi)

Vilankulo District or Vilanculos District is a district of Inhambane Province in south-east Mozambique. Its principal town is Vilankulo. The district is located at the east of the province, and borders with Inhassoro District in the north and Massinga District in the south and in the west. In the east, the district is bounded by the Indian Ocean. The area of the district is 5,867 square kilometres (2,265 mi^{2}). It has a population of 135,710 as of 2007.

== Geography ==
The climate is tropical arid in the interior of the district and tropical humid at the coast. The annual rainfall at the coast achieves 1,500 millimetres (59 in), mainly falling in February and March.

== Administrative divisions ==
The district is divided into two postos, Vilankulo (three localities) and Mapinhane (three localities).

== Demographics ==
As of 2005, 42% of the population of the district was younger than 15 years. 39% did speak Portuguese. The population was predominantly speaking Chopi language. 64% were analphabetic, mostly women.

== Economy ==
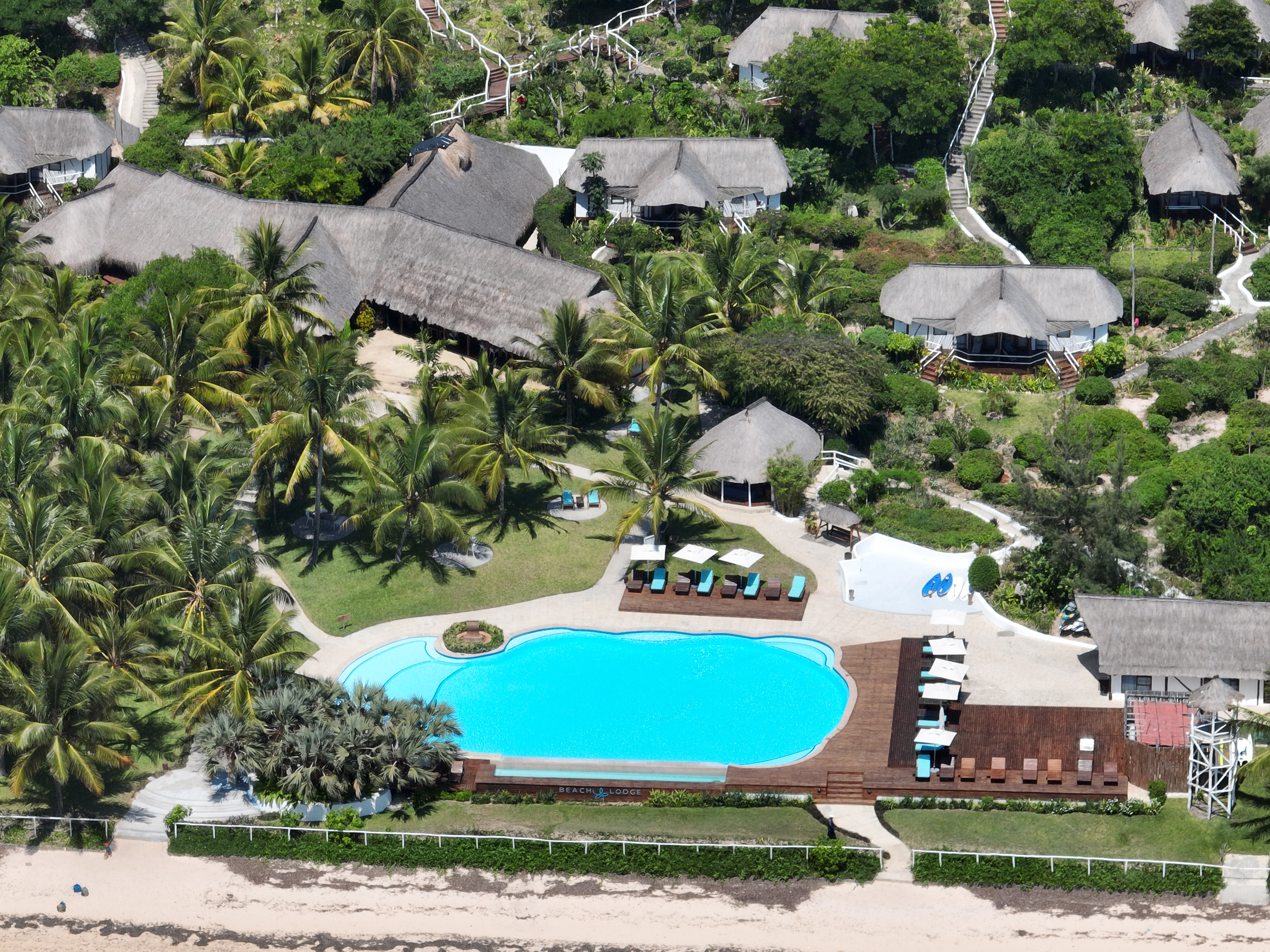
Aerial view of a beach-lodge and coastline at Vilankulo, Mozambique.

In 2005, 1% of the households in the district had electricity. Woodcutting and fishery belong to traditional meand of subsistence of the population of the district.

=== Agriculture ===
In 2005, the district had 26,000 farms exploiting on average the area of 1.5 hectares (0.0058 mi^{2}) each. The main agricultural products are maize, cassava, cowpea, and peanuts.

=== Transportation ===
There is a road network in the district which includes the 122 kilometres (76 mi) stretch of the national road EN1 (20 kilometres (12 mi)) is a connection to Vilankulo), crossing the eastern part of the district, and about 220 kilometres (140 mi) of secondary roads.

Vilankulo has an international airport. It, in particular, serves as a base for charter flights to Bazaruto Island Airport located on the Bazaruto Archipelago.
