= Zavala (surname) =

Zavala is a Basque surname, also written as Zabala, which is the correct spelling in Basque. The variant Zavala is much more common in South America than in Europe. Notable people with the surname include:

- Zavala (producer), American record producer
- Aaron Zavala (born 2000), an American baseball outfielder and third baseman
- Adina Emilia De Zavala (1861–1955), American teacher, historian and preservationist
- África Zavala (born 1985), Mexican actress
- Alejandra Zavala (born 1984), Mexican sport shooter
- Alfredo de Zavala y Lafora (1893–1995), Spanish lawyer, Governor of the Bank of Spain, Minister of Finance
- America Vera Zavala (born 1976), Swedish politician and political writer
- Ana Rubio Zavala (born 1993), Spanish Paralympic swimmer
- Andrés Allamand Zavala (born 1956), Chilean politician
- Aremi Fuentes Zavala (born 1993), Mexican weightlifter
- Beatriz Zavala (born 1957), Mexican politician
- Boby Zavala (born 1991), Mexican professional wrestler
- Carlos Zavala (born 1969), Mexican-American footballer
- Cedric Bixler-Zavala (born 1974), American musician
- Chandler Zavala (born 1999), American football player
- Concepción Castella García-Duarte (1889–1966), Spanish writer known as Concepción Castella de Zavala
- Consuelo Zavala (1874–1956), Mexican feminist teacher
- Cristián Zavala (born 1999), Chilean footballer
- Dani Zavala (born 1990), American-born Guamanian footballer
- Domingo Maza Zavala (1922–2010), Venezuelan economist
- Eddie Zavála Vázquez, Puerto Rican politician
- Eulogio Gillow y Zavala (1841–1922), Mexican Roman Catholic archbishop
- Fernando Zavala (born 1971), Peruvian politician
- Gabino Zavala (born 1951), U.S. Catholic priest, former auxiliary bishop of Los Angeles
- Gabriel Zavala (died 2021), Mexican-born mariachi player and teacher
- Gabriela Teissier Zavala, Mexican journalist
- Gabriela Zavala (born 1985), Honduran beauty queen
- Guillermo Zavala (born 1958), Mexican swimmer
- Hernán Lara Zavala (born 1946), Mexican novelist and literary critic
- Iris M. Zavala (1936–2020), Puerto Rican author
- Isidro Camarillo Zavala (born 1951), Mexican politician
- Jaime Galarza Zavala (1930–2023), Ecuadorian writer and politician
- Javier López Zavala (born 1969), Mexican politician
- Jesús Zavala (actor) (born 1991), Mexican actor and singer
- Jesús Eduardo Zavala (born 1987), Mexican footballer
- Jimmy Zavala (born 1955), American musician
- Joaquín Zavala (1835–1906), President of Nicaragua
- José María Zavala Castella (1924–1992), Spanish politician
- Jorge Zavala (1921–2014), Ecuadorian politician
- José Víctor Zavala (1815–1886), Guatemalan Field Marshal
- Juan de Zavala (1804–1879), Spanish noble and politician
- Kimiss Zavala (born 2004), Mozambican footballer
- Lauro Zavala (born 1954), Mexican literary theorist
- Lorenzo de Zavala (1788–1836), Mexican politician
- Margarita Zavala (born 1967), wife of Mexican President Felipe Calderón and First Lady of Mexico
- Maria Elena Zavala (born 1950), American plant biologist
- María Guadalupe García Zavala (1878–1963), Mexican Roman Catholic religious sister
- María Zavala Valladares (born 1956), Peruvian politician, lawyer and judge
- Miguel Ángel Zavala (born 1961), Mexican diver
- Miguel Ángel Zavala Ortiz (1905–1982), Argentinian lawyer and diplomat
- Miguel García Granados Zavala (1809–1878), President of Guatemala
- Osvaldo Zavala Giler, Ecuadorian jurist
- Patricia Zavala (born 1985), Venezuelan model and television host
- Patricio Alberto Chávez Závala (born 1967), Ecuadorian engineer and diplomat
- Pedro José de Zavala, 7th Marquess of Valleumbroso (1779–1850), Spanish-Peruvian nobleman
- Raúl Covarrubias Zavala (born 1965), Mexican politician
- Rubén Alfredo Torres Zavala (born 1968), Mexican politician
- Seby Zavala (born 1993), American baseball catcher
- Silvio Zavala (1909–2014), Mexican historian
- Tito Zavala (born 1954), Chilean Anglican bishop
- Victor Pereyra-Zavala (born 1999), American footballer

== See also ==
- Savalas, a surname of Greek origin
