= Chopi =

Chopi may refer to:

- Chopi people, an ethnic group of Mozambique
- Chopi language, a Bantu language spoken along the southern coast of Mozambique
- Chopi blackbird (Gnorimopsar chopi), a bird of family Icteridae
- A spice made from Zanthoxylum piperitum, an aromatic plant in the family Rutaceae
