= Massinga District =

Coordinates: 23.332°S 35.382°E

Massinga
- District
- Massinga District on the map of Mozambique
- Country: Mozambique
- Province: Inhambane
- Capital: Massinga

Area
  - Total: 7,458 km^{2} (2,880 sq mi)

Population (2007 census)
  - Total: 184,531
  - Density: 24.74/km^{2} (64.08/sq mi)

Massinga District is a district of Inhambane Province in south-east Mozambique. Its principal town is Massinga. The district is located at the east of the province and borders with Inhassoro District in the north, Vilanculos District in the northeast, Morrumbene District in the south, and with Funhalouro District in the west. In the east, the district is bounded by the Indian Ocean. The area of the district is 7,458 square kilometres (2,880 mi^{2}). In terms of the area, this is the biggest district of Inhambane Province. It has a population of 184,531 as of 2007.

== Geography ==
There are no rivers in the district which flow throughout the whole year, only streams generated by rain.

The climate is tropical arid in the interior, with the annual rainfall varying between 650 millimetres (26 in) and 750 millimetres (30 in), and tropical humid at the coast, with the annual rainfall being 1,200 millimetres (47 in).

== History ==
In 1894, Massinga Military Command was established, thus bringing part of the area under the control of the military. In 1897, this part was subordinated to Gaza District, and in 1907, it was transferred to Inhambane District, thus bringing all current area of Massinga District, under both civil and military rule, into Inhambane District. Later in the same year, the military rule was abolished, and Massinga Circunscrição, a type of administrative unit used in Portuguese colonies in Africa, was established. In July 1986, a new administrative division of Mozambique was introduced, and Massinga District was established.

== Administrative divisions ==
The district is divided into two postos, Massinga (three localities) and Chicomo (two localities).

== Demographics ==
As of 2005, 43% of the population of the district was younger than 15 years. 17% did speak Portuguese. The population was predominantly speaking Chopi language. 59% were analphabetic, mostly women.

== Economy ==
In 2005, 1% of the households in the district had electricity.

=== Agriculture ===
In 2005, the district had 42,000 farms exploiting on average the area of 1.3 hectares (0.0050 mi^{2}) each. The main agricultural products are maize, cassava, cowpea, peanuts, sweet potatoes, cotton, and rice.

=== Transportation ===
There is a road network in the district which includes the 90 kilometres (56 mi) stretch of the national road EN1, crossing the eastern part of the district, and about 600 kilometres (370 mi) secondary roads.
