= Homoine District =

Coordinates: 23.884°S 35.153°E

Homoine
- District
- Homoine District on the map of Mozambique
- Country: Mozambique
- Province: Inhambane
- Capital: Vila de Homoine

Area
  - Total: 1,891 km^{2} (730 sq mi)

Population (2007 census)
  - Total: 107,475
  - Density: 56.84/km^{2} (147.2/sq mi)

Homoine District is a district of Inhambane Province in south-east Mozambique. Its principal town is Vila de Homoine. The district is located at the east of the province, and borders with Morrumbene District in the north, Jangamo District in the southeast, Inharrime District in the south, Panda District in the west, and Funhalouro District in the northwest. In the east, the district is bounded by the Indian Ocean. The area of the district is 1,891 square kilometres (730 mi^{2}). It has a population of 107.475 as of 2007.

== Geography ==
The principal rivers in the district are the Domo-Domo River, the Nhanombe River, and the Nhalihave River. There are two lakes, Lake Pembe and Lake Nhavarre.

The climate is tropical semi-arid, with the annual rainfall being 880 millimetres (35 in). Savanna occupies the largest part of the district.

== Administrative divisions ==
The district is divided into two postos, Homoine (seven localities, including Vila de Homoine, the administrative center of the district) and Pembe (two localities).

== Demographics ==
As of 2005, 42% of the population of the district was younger than 15 years. 49% did speak Portuguese, and the most common mothertongue was Chopi. 53% were analphabetic, mostly women. The population density in Homoine District is higher than in other districts of Inhambane Province.

== Economy ==
The economy in the interior of the district was badly damaged by the civil war. For example, out of 103 lodges which existed before the war, only 49 were in operation after the war. 1% of the households have electricity.

There is exploitation of white sand deposits, as well as of stone for construction, on a relatively small scale.

=== Agriculture ===
In the district, there are 23,000 farms which have on average 1.3 hectares (0.0050 mi^{2}) of land. The main agricultural products are corn, cassava, cowpea, peanut, sweet potato, rice, and sorghum.

=== Transportation ===
The total length of the roads in Homoine District is 300 kilometres (190 mi).
