= Zavala =

Zavala may refer to:

== Places ==
- Zavala County, Texas
- Zavala, Mozambique
- Zavala District, a district of Mozambique
- Zavala, Bosnia-Herzegovina
- Zavala, Bulgaria
- Zavala Island, Antarctica
- Zavala, Dubrovnik-Neretva County, a village in the Slivno municipality, Croatia
- Zavala, Split-Dalmatia County, a village near Jelsa, Croatia

== Other uses ==
- Zavala (producer), American record producer
- Zavala (surname)
- Texan schooner Zavala
- Zavala Monastery in Bosnia
- Commander Zavala, a major character from the Destiny video game series.
