= Inharrime District =

Coordinates: 24°28′37″S 35°01′49″E

Inharrime
- District
- Inharrime District on the map of Mozambique
- Country: Mozambique
- Province: Inhambane
- Capital: Inharrime

Area
  - Total: 2,744 km^{2} (1,059 sq mi)

Population (2007 census)
  - Total: 97,471
  - Density: 35.52/km^{2} (92.00/sq mi)

Inharrime District is a district of Inhambane Province in southeastern Mozambique. Its principal town is Inharrime. The district is located at the south of the province, and borders Panda and Homoine Districts in the north, Jangamo District in the northwest, Zavala District in the south, and Manjacaze District of Gaza Province in west. In the east, the district is bounded by the Indian Ocean. The area of the district is 2,744 square kilometres (1,059 mi^{2}). It has a population of 97.471 as of 2007.

== Geography ==
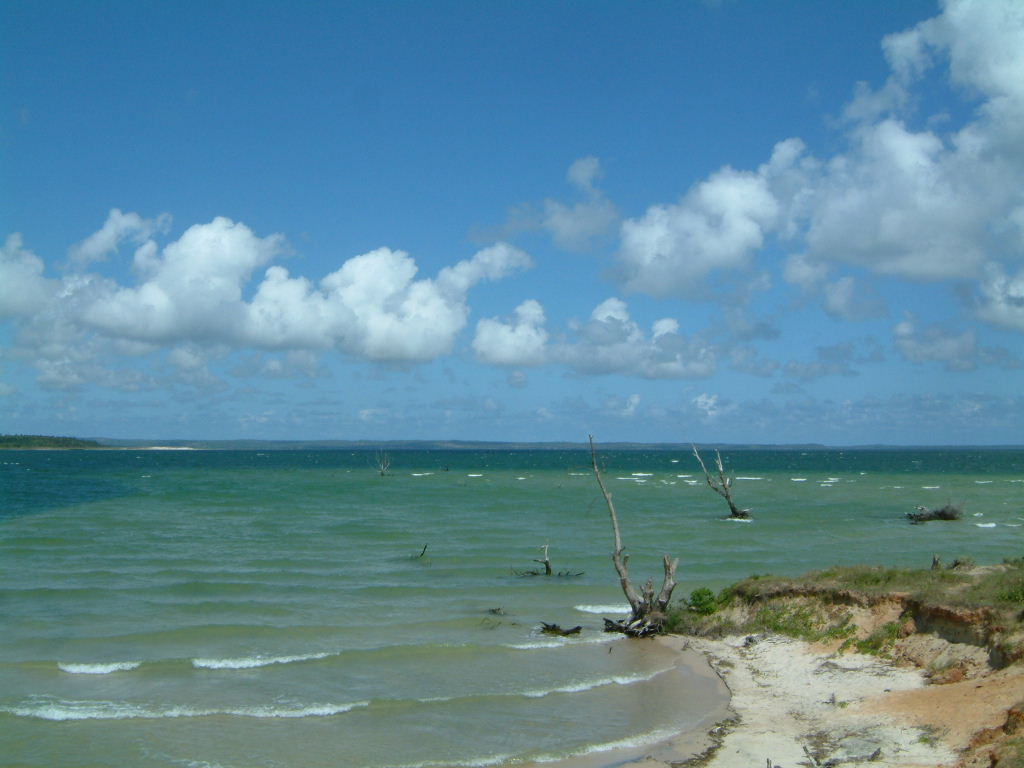
A lake in the district

The district is elongated from west to east, between the western border of the province and the ocean. The principal rivers in the district are the Inharime River, the Nhanitande River, the Nhaliuaue River, and the Inhassune River. There are multiple lakes as well.

The climate is tropical semi-arid in the interior and tropical humid at the coast. The annual rainfall at the coast is around 1,500 millimetres (59 in), and in the interior it varies between 1,000 millimetres (39 in) and 1,200 millimetres (47 in).

== History ==
The name "Inharyni" was recorded by Vasco da Gama during his 1498 Indian expedition; it is not entirely clear whether this is identical to Inharrime, which appears much later in the colonial documents. In 1815, the Portuguese colonial administration was established in Nhamiba, currently Inharrime. Later it was moved to the current location.

== Administrative divisions ==
The district is divided into two postos, Inharrime (three localities) and Mocumbi (two localities).

== Demographics ==
As of 2005, 45% of the population of the district was younger than 15 years. The most common mother tongue among the population was Chopi. 44% were analphabetic, mostly women.

== Economy ==
About 1% of the households in the district have access to electricity.

=== Agriculture ===
In the district, there are 18,000 farms which have on average 2.5 hectares (0.0097 mi^{2}) of land. The main agricultural products are corn, cassava, cowpea, peanut, cotton, and sugar cane.

=== Transportation ===
There is a road network in the district which includes a 40 kilometres (25 mi) stretch of the national road EN1, crossing the eastern part of the district.
