= Camarillo (disambiguation) =

Camarillo is a city in Ventura County in the U.S. state of California.

Camarillo may also refer to:

== People ==
- Juan Camarillo Jr. (1867–1936), Californio landowner and philanthropist, co-founder of Camarillo
  - Adolfo Camarillo (1864–1958), his brother, Californio ranchero and co-founder of Camarillo, California
- Ángel Camarillo (born 1959), Spanish cyclist
- Angelina (American singer) (Angelina Camarillo Ramos, born 1976), American singer
- Dolores Camarillo (1910–1988), Mexican actress
- Greg Camarillo (born 1982), American footballer
- Isidro Camarillo Zavala (born 1951), Mexican politician
- María Enriqueta Camarillo (1872–1968), Mexican poet and author
- Rich Camarillo (born 1959), American footballer
- Rubén Camarillo Ortega (born 1961), Mexican politician
- Sharon Camarillo (fl. 2006), Californian rodeo champion

== Other uses ==
- 5653 Camarillo, an asteroid

== See also ==
- Camarilla (disambiguation)
- Camarillo White Horse, a rare horse breed
- Terry Scott Taylor, Californian musician known as Camarillo Eddy
