= Xai-Xai District =

Coordinates: 25°03′S 33°39′E

Xai-Xai
- District
- Xai-Xai District on the map of Mozambique
- Country: Mozambique
- Province: Gaza
- Capital: Chongoene

Area
  - Total: 1,908 km^{2} (737 sq mi)

Population (2007 census)
  - Total: 166,488
  - Density: 87.26/km^{2} (226.0/sq mi)

Xai-Xai District is a district of Gaza Province in south-western Mozambique. The administrative center of the district is Chongoene. The district is located in the south of the province, and borders with Chibuto District in the north, Manjacaze District in the east, Bilene Macia District in the southeast, and with Chókwè District in the west. In the south, it is bounded by the Indian Ocean. The area of the district is 1,908 square kilometres (737 mi^{2}). It has a population of 188,720 as of 2007.

== Geography ==
The Limpopo River flows through the district to the ocean. The Lumane River, a tributary of the Limpopo, is an outflow of Lake Pave. Other rivers only flow during the rainy season.

The climate of the district is tropical humid. The annual rainfall varies between 925 millimetres (36.4 in) and 1,145 millimetres (45.1 in).

== History ==
In 1925, Gaza Province was transformed into the district with the administrative center in Chongoene, however, in the same year the center was transferred to Xai-Xai. The settlement due to its location close to the mouth of the Limpopo River, had a tremendous impact on the area. Xai-Xai was renamed Vila João Belo; the original name was returned after the independence.

== Demographics ==
As of 2005, 44% of the population of the district was younger than 15 years. 42% of the population spoke Portuguese. The most common mothertongue among the population was Tsonga. 52% were analphabetic, mostly women.

== Administrative divisions ==
The district is divided into three postos, Chicumbane (five localities), Chongoene (five localities), and Zongoene (three localities). The city of Xai-Xai is incorporated separately and does not belong to the district.

== Economy ==
3% of the households in the district have access to electricity.

=== Agriculture ===
In the district, there are 10,000 farms which have on average 1.1 hectares (0.0042 mi^{2}) of land. The main agricultural products are corn, cassava, cowpea, peanut, sweet potato, and rice. Population of cattle, pigs, sheep, and goats was steadily growing prior to 2005.

=== Transportation ===
There is a road network in the district which includes a stretch of the national road EN1, connecting Maputo and Inhambane, as well as secondary roads.

=== Water and Sanitation Services ===
Access to paid piped potable water over the years: ??

Access to (paid) potable water from boreholes (hand pumps / solar pumps): ??.
