= 1973 Portuguese Mozambican Legislative Assembly election =

Elections to a Legislative Assembly were held for the first and only time in Portuguese Mozambique in March 1973.

== Background ==
On 2 May 1972 the Portuguese National Assembly passed the Organic Law for the Overseas Territories, which provided for greater autonomy for overseas territories. Mozambique was to have a 50-member Legislative Assembly, of which 20 would be elected. The remainder would be nominated by public services, religious groups and business groups.

Candidates were required to be Portuguese citizens who had lived in Mozambique for more than three years and be able to read and write Portuguese. Voters were required to be literate. As the Portuguese constitution banned political parties at the time, the majority of candidates were put forward by the ruling People's National Action movement, although some civic associations were allowed to nominate candidates.

== Results ==
Out of a total population of over eight million, only around 112,000 people were registered to vote. Voter turnout was around 92%. Of all the Portuguese colonies holding Legislative Assembly elections, Mozambique was the only one to have a non-white majority of its membership, with 26 of the 50 members being non-white. The 26 non-white members included 18 Africans, three coloureds, three Indians, one Goan and one Chinese.

=== Elected members ===
Constituency	Elected members
Beira	Alda da Conceição Dias Carreira de Moura Almeida
Beira	Tito Manuel Jeque
Cabo Delgado	Atanásio Valério Muíto
Cabo Delgado	Domingos da Silva Leal
Gaza	António Abrantes de Oliveira
Gaza	Filipe José Messano
Inhambane	Felisberto Joaquim Machatine
Inhambane	Francisco Nelson Leal de Lima
Lourenço Marques	Leonardo Samissone Bucucha
Lourenço Marques	Manuel João Correia
Moçambique	Abel Manuel Pott
Moçambique	Manuel de Almeida Saraiva
Niassa	Francisco José Gonçalves Pires
Niassa	Mário Ussene
Tete	João António Dias
Tete	José Boaventura da Conceição Ribeiro
Vila Pery	Luciano Henrique Nunes Pereira
Vila Pery	Paulo Otheniel Dimene
Zambezia	Arquíssandás Jugoldás
Zambezia	Rui Correia dos Santos Torres Vouga
Source: Esteves

=== Nominated members ===
Nominators	Nominated members
Administrative bodies and public utility entities	Abdool Magid Abdool Karin Vakil
Administrative bodies and public utility entities	Inácio Bragança
Administrative bodies and public utility entities	João José Craveirinha
Administrative bodies and public utility entities	José Palma Pinto
Administrative bodies and public utility entities	Victor Manuel Videira Barreto
Administrative bodies and public utility entities	Waldemar Fernandes Botelho
Corporate organisations representing companies and associations of economic interests	Joaquim Francisco Valente Nunes de Carvalho
Corporate organisations representing companies and associations of economic interests	Jorge de Abreu
Corporate organisations representing companies and associations of economic interests	José Luís Bobella Nogueira de Sampayo Torres Fevereiro
Corporate organisations representing companies and associations of economic interests	Raul Teodomiro de Chaby Satúrio Pires
Corporate organisations representing companies and associations of economic interests	Ricardo Ferreira Martins
Corporate organisations representing companies and associations of economic interests	Salim Issá
Organisations representing moral and cultural interests	Armando Rego da Silva
Organisations representing moral and cultural interests	Carlos Jacinto Ferreira Pó
Organisations representing moral and cultural interests	Gilberto Lage Teixeira
Organisations representing moral and cultural interests	Gonçalo Castelo-Branco da Costa de Sousa Macedo Mesquitela
Organisations representing moral and cultural interests	Himlock
Organisations representing moral and cultural interests	Joaquim Pereira Soares
Organisations representing workers	Almor Fernandes de Sousa
Organisations representing workers	Assahel Jonassane Mazula
Organisations representing workers	Domingos Vieira Martins
Organisations representing workers	João Mateus Júnio
Organisations representing workers	José António Marrana
Organisations representing workers	Manuel Nobre
Regional governments	Eduardo Cuna
Regional governments	Eugénio Pereira
Regional governments	Francisco José Cabral
Regional governments	Horácio Pereira Uachisso Zualo
Regional governments	Jorge Adriano Nampula
Regional governments	Luís Francisco Mabunda
Source: Esteves
