= Zavala District =

Coordinates: 24°41′S 34°40′E

Zavala
- District
- Zavala District on the map of Mozambique
- Country: Mozambique
- Province: Inhambane
- Capital: Zavala

Area
  - Total: 1,997 km^{2} (771 sq mi)

Population (2007 census)
  - Total: 139,616
  - Density: 69.91/km^{2} (181.1/sq mi)

Zavala District is a district of Inhambane Province in south-east Mozambique. Its principal town is Zavala. The district is located at the east of the province, and borders with Inharrime District in the north and with Manjacaze District of Gaza Province in the west. In the east and in the south, the district is bounded by the Indian Ocean. The area of the district is 1,997 square kilometres (771 mi^{2}). It has a population of 139.616 as of 2007.

== Geography ==
The rivers in the northern part of the district belong to the drainage basin of the Inharime River. Rivers in much of the south of the district drain into Lake Poolela.

The climate is tropical arid in the interior and tropical humid at the coast. The annual rainfall at the coast is around 1,500 millimetres (59 in), and in the interior it varies between 1,000 millimetres (39 in) and 1,200 millimetres (47 in).

== History ==
Quissico was founded between 1914 and 1916 and was granted a town status during colonial times.

== Demographics ==
As of 2005, 46% of the population of the district was younger than 15 years. 50% of the population spoke Portuguese. The most common mothertongue among the population was Chopi. 53% were analphabetic, mostly women.

== Administrative divisions ==
The district is divided into two postos, Zavala (two localities) and Zandamela (two localities).

== Economy ==
Less than 1% of the households in the district have access to electricity.

=== Agriculture ===
In the district, there are 30,000 farms which have on average 2.5 hectares (0.0097 mi^{2}) of land. The main agricultural products are corn, cassava, cowpea, peanut, sweet potato, and rice.

=== Transportation ===
There is a road network in the district which includes a 100 kilometres (62 mi) stretch of the national road EN1, running along the coast. The total length of the roads in the district is 233 kilometres (145 mi).
