= Inharrime =

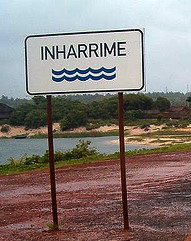
- Inharrime river sign

- Location within Mozambique
- Coordinates: 24°28′37″S 35°01′49″E
- Country: Mozambique
- Province: Inhambane
- District: Inharrime

Inharrime is a small town in Inharrime District in southern Mozambique on the shores of some coastal lakes.

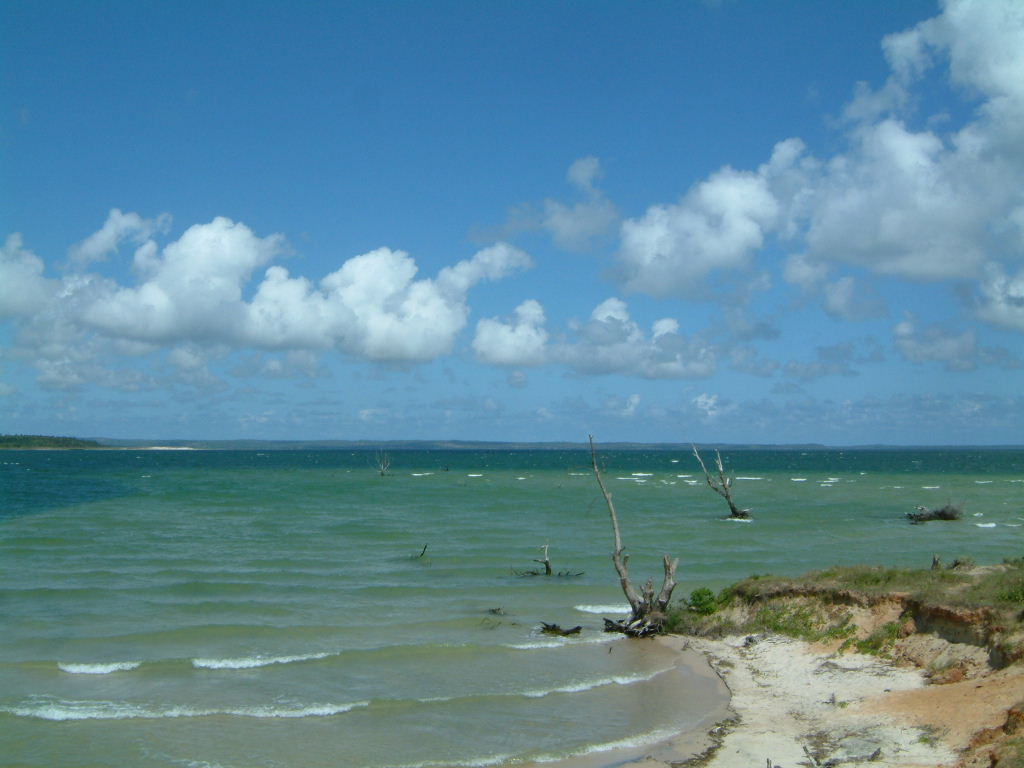

== Transport ==
It was once served by an isolated narrow-gauge railway from the port of Inhambane. It is now accessible by bus services from the capital of Mozambique, Maputo. Smaller buses called chapas run between Inharrime and Inhambane several times per day.

== Casa Laura Vicuña ==
Casa Laura Vicuña is an institution founded in Inharrime in 2004 by the Salesian Sisters of Mozambique. It offers various services to the surrounding community, including an orphanage that provides a home for 90 girls age three and older, a large farm and animal husbandry operation, a bakery, and a public primary and secondary school (pre-K through 12th grade as of 2011). The sisters and their collaborators provide literacy classes for local women and offer nutritional education support for children from families without sufficient resources.

== International Support ==
The American NGO Friends of Inharrime serves the people of the district of Inharrime in conjunction with the Salesian Sisters' school and orphanage located in the district. Programs provided include nutritional support to children through a sponsorship program (monthly donations of food to each child), as well as financial support to pay for education and medical expenses.

== See also ==
- Transport in Mozambique
- Railway stations in Mozambique
