= Camarilla (disambiguation) =

A camarilla is a group of courtiers or favourites who surround a king or ruler.

Camarilla may also refer to:

- Camarilla, a fictional sect from the Vampire: The Masquerade books and role-playing games
- Camarilla, a 2003 play by Van Badham

== See also ==
- Camarillo (disambiguation)
- Camarillas, a municipality in Teruel, Aragon, Spain
  - Camarillas Formation, a geological formation in Teruel and La Rioja
- Camarillasaurus, a dinosaur
- Camarilla obliqua, or Allium obliquum, a Eurasian species of wild onion
