= Chopi people =

Bantu ethnic group of Mozambique

The Chopi are a Bantu ethnic group of Mozambique. They have lived primarily in the Zavala region of southern Mozambique, in the Inhambane Province. They traditionally lived a life of subsistence agriculture, traditionally living a rural existence, although many were displaced or killed in the civil war that followed Mozambique's liberation from Portuguese colonial rule in 1975. In addition, drought forced many away from their homeland and into the nation's cities.

The Chopi speak Chichopi, a tonal language in the Bantu family, with many also speaking chiTonga and Portuguese as secondary languages. They are related to the Tsonga people of Mozambique and South Africa and their neighbors include the Shangaan ethnic group who live to the west, in the Gaza Province, and who invaded Chopi territory in the 19th century. Historically, some Chopi were made subjects under Portuguese protection and others became migrant laborers in South Africa.

The Chopi identify culturally, as a people, with the elephant.

== History ==
According to oral traditions of the people themselves, the Chopi people are part of the original Bantu people who migrated from Central Africa between 100AD and 200AD and settled in parts of Tanzania, Malawi, Northern Zambia, and Mozambique, and are reputed to be the first of the Bantu tribes to establish contact with the San people of South-East Africa. The name of the people is properly spelled as "Bacopi" or "Vacopi" in the Chopi language which is remarkably similar to the Xitsonga language. The name of the Chopi people comes from their use of bows and arrows, which they adopted from the San people as they were the first to interact with the early San bushmen from the area between Tanzania and Mozambique.

The Chopi people in reality are part of the first Thonga (Tonga) people who went on to form various colonies in southern Africa in countries such as Zimbabwe, Malawi, Zambia, Mozambique, and South Africa. The people mastered the art of manufacturing using wood, iron, and clay from a very early stage. They made wooden instruments, smelted iron, and hunted elephants and other animals. Portuguese sailors, who were the first Europeans to arrive in Africa, encountered the Chopi people on the coast of Mozambique in the 1400s. The Portuguese people established trade operations on Chopi territory and many of the Chopi people were conscripted into the Portuguese army as time passed. Breakaway groups migrated away from these parts in the 1640s to settle in South Africa where they founded new kingdoms (such as the N'wanati Kingdom of the Chopi king Gunyule from which the Maluleke people originate from). The Chopi people were well-known craft-makers in Mozambique and in the 1700s traded with the kingdoms of Zimbabwe, which gave rise to great empires such as the Rozwi-Kalanga empire. Chopi tribes included names such as Mondlane, Chivambu, Mbande, Mavila, Masingisa, Chirinda, Makwakwa, and many others.

In the 1820s the Chopi people were invaded by Nguni warlords who left South African territory from the Natal region. Nguni tribes were embroiled in wars between themselves from around 1815 where many tribes were slain at the hands of dominant war lords such as Shaka Zulu and the tribes led by Zwide. The impact of the Nguni wars Mfecane reached the Chopi territory where Manukosi Soshangane and others from Zwide's kingdom overran various parts of Mozambique with the intent of subjugating as many tribes as possible and to control the land's vast resources for gold, iron, ivory, and taxation. The Chopi people at the time were still under Portuguese rule and the Shangaan invaders feared attacking the Chopi people as they were armed with rifles from the Portuguese soldiers and many of them also used bows and poisoned arrows. When the new ruler of Gaza (Nghunghunyana) invaded their territory near the Limpopo River and attempted to subjugate them in 1888, a war ensued between the Chopi people and the Gaza forces that effectively lasted from 1889 and ended in 1895 when Nghunghunyana was defeated by the Portuguese and Chopi soldiers. The Chopi people have managed to sustain their senior traditional leadership from invasion and it exists today in Inhambane, Bileni, and even as far as the Limpopo River at the Mapai territory.

== Music and dance ==
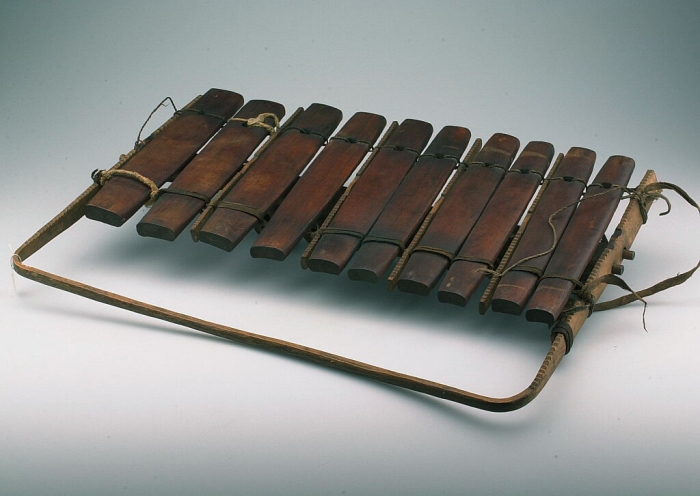
A xylophone of the Chopi, with ten bars and calabash sound boxes below

The Chopi people are famous for their traditional music, the most famous of their instruments being the mbila (plural: timbila), a xylophone played in large groups. This music was proclaimed a Masterpiece of the Oral and Intangible Heritage of Humanity by UNESCO in 2005. The music and dance of the timbila is performed in a large orchestra and the dancers put on a show and dance that bears much similarity to the dance style of the Tsonga people of South Africa, particularly the Xibelani dance and other footwork dance styles. Most of the Tsonga traditional music features synthesized marimba instruments and this musical tradition appears to have been carried down from the Chopi people.

In his book The Life of a South African Tribe: The Psychic Life, Henri-Alexandre Junod identified the Chopi people stating that "in the Province of Mozambique the Ba-Chopi are certainly the best musicians" - referring to the Chopi people's mastery of marimbas, xylophones and other native instruments. He further adds that "many timbila are often played together by musicians who form an orchestra. This is rarely the case amongst Thonga but frequently amongst the Ba-Chopi, who are the true "masters" of this instrument (Junod 1913, p. 254). Other instruments used by the Chopi include panpipes, whistles, animal horns, rattles, drums of various sizes, musical bows, and a globular flute with three holes made from the dried shell of the nkuso fruit (bush orange).

== Cuisine ==
The Chopi's traditional foods include cassava (manioc) and cashew nuts. They also produce a number of traditional alcoholic beverages, which are produced from fermented tangerines or cashews.

== Films ==
- 1980 - The Chopi Timbila Dance. Directed by Andrew Tracey.
- Chopi Music of Mozambique. Directed by Ron Hallis.
- Banguza Timbila. Directed by Ron Hallis.
- 1994 - A Spirit Here Today: A Scrapbook of Chopi Village Music. Directed by Gei Zantzinger. Filmed in 1973.

== See also ==
- Demographics of Mozambique
- Music of Mozambique
