= Savalas =

Savalas is a surname of Greek origin that may refer to:

- Ariana Savalas (born 1987), American musician, daughter of Telly
- George Savalas (1924–1985), American actor, brother of Telly
- Telly Savalas (1922–1994), American actor

== See also ==
- Zavala (disambiguation)
