= Xibelani dance =

Traditional dance performed by the Tsonga people in northern South Africa

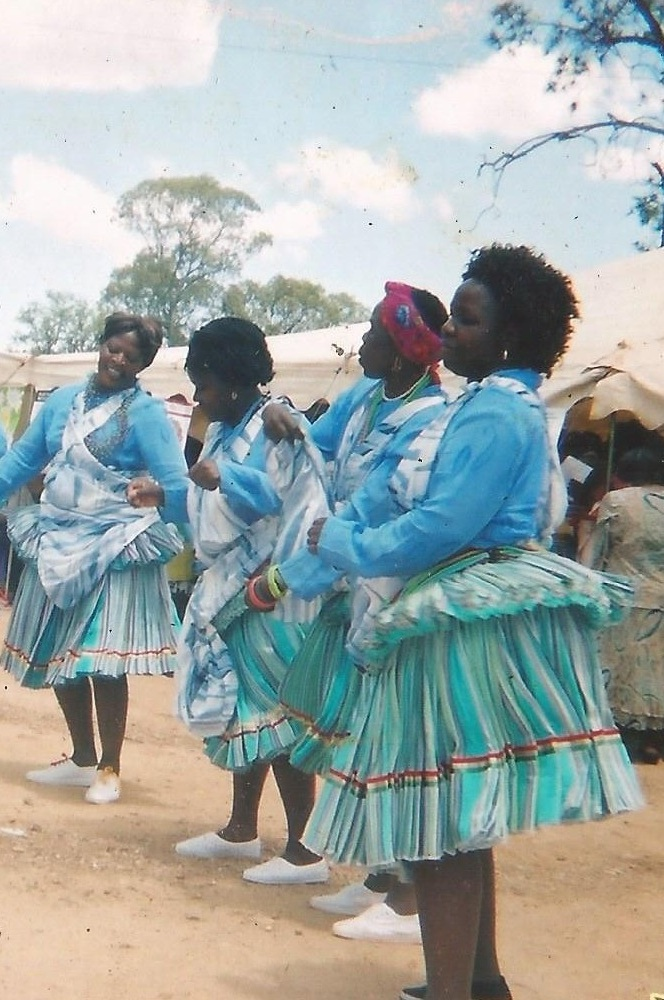
Vatsonga women doing the xibelani dance

The xibelani dance (Shibelani, Shibelana, Shibelane) is an indigenous dance of the Tsonga women from Mpumalanga and Limpopo located in South Africa. The name of the dance comes from the native Xitsonga language and it can translate to "hitting to the rhythm", for example, the concept "xi Bela ni vunanga". The name "xibelani" typically refers to the dance style while the skirt itself is referred to as "tinguvu", however, the term "xibelani" is sometimes used to refer to both the dance and the skirt.

== History ==
The history of the xibelani dance goes way back into the early coastal times of southern Mozambique from the 1400s or earlier when Mozambican tribes were experimenting with musical instruments and particularly wooden instruments and percussion sounds from traditional drums, xylophones, and marimbas. The indigenous Chopi people became particularly active in this art and are the documented source concerning the early times of this form of music and dance, the timbila which has been registered in the UNESCO heritage archives as a Masterpiece of the Oral and Intangible Heritage of Humanity. The dance style, in essence, requires the dancer to shake the hips in tune with the rhythm but the whole body should be used to guide the movements.

Xibelani dancers usually accompanied the percussion music in addition to hand clapping and whistles. When the mbila (xylophone) and swigubu (drum) players engaged in an orchestra, the Tsonga women would follow up with the singing, which was in the form of a call-and-response method, and at intervals the women would take turns to dance in front of the orchestra. The xibelani skirts of old were made with various fibers, wool, strings, and grass. The modern xibelani are often long dresses made with strong cloth which gives the name tinguvu.

== Method ==
In the xibelani dance, the Tsonga women tie a type of African skirt—the xibelani commonly known as "tinguvu"—around their waist and then shake from the waist. The xibelani skirt is designed to make the wearer's hips look bigger, and thereby to emphasize the shaking. The skirt itself is made from cloth or wool and is customized with a range of colors and designs. The cloth or wool is woven either by hand or by machine and designed in the manner that it resembles a type of Caribbean skirt.

Modern-day xibelani skirts are usually designed for dancing and therefore have a swirl when the hips are shaken. The methodology of its dance style is the typical Caribbean shake, although with a faster rhythm and a more complicated dance routine that is customary for the Tsonga people.

== Uses ==
It is customary for Tsonga girls to learn the xibelani dance, and it is a way for them to express pride in their cultural heritage. The xibelani dance is used on occasions such as mkhinyavezo and Ku chachula, as well as to accompany other traditional dances such as the makhwaya and mchongolo. Traditionally women dance the xibelani, while men perform the makhwaya, Xincayinciy(xigubu) and on rare occasions participate in the mchongolo.

The Tsongas perform the xibelani dance to their own distinct music, usually Tsonga disco or Tsonga ndzhumbha (Xitsonga traditional music) and it has become typical for all Tsonga bands to have female xibelani dancers. The xibelani and tshetsha dances have experienced regained popularity in modern Giyani as the people have embraced their traditional ways.

While the xibelani dance is customary for women, some men now also participate in it, especially when there is a xiseveseve (a type of party). In modern society the xibelani dance is regarded as an open dance in which everyone can participate, and it is also used both in church as well as in rituals.

== See also ==
- Music of Mozambique
- Origin
- Oringe
