= Secondary School of Doane =

High school in Mozambique

Coordinates: 21°00′14.56″S 34°58′12.93″E

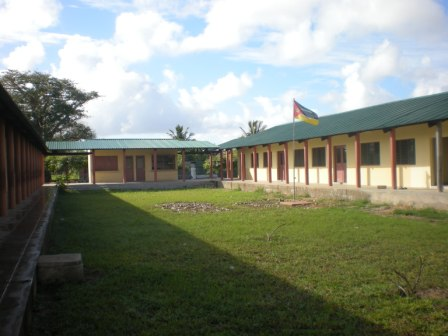
The Secondary School of Doane.

The Secondary School of Doane (Portuguese: Escola Secundária de Doane) is a high school administering the first cycle (i.e. grades 8–10) of secondary education in Mozambique. The school is located in Nova Mambone, Inhambane, Mozambique.

In the Mozambican education system, the school is classified as type C (having fewer than 20 classrooms). In the beginning of the 2010 school year, the student body consisted of 1094 students, 106 of which attended the night school. There were plans for the student capacity of the school to grow, and 2010 showed an increase from the 858 students at the beginning of the 2009 academic year. The physical capacity of the school is also currently being expanded, with the South African company Sasol overseeing the construction of new classrooms and houses for teachers (two classrooms and six houses were to be inaugurated in 2010).

The classes at the school are given in three sections: in the morning, grades 9-10 are taught, in the evening, the grade 8 students are taught and, at night, the night students (grades 8–10). Each section consists of six 45-minute lessons, with four 5-minute breaks and a 15-minute main break.

In 2009, the pedagogical faculty consisted of 19 teachers, one of whom doubled as the Pedagogical Director and one of whom was the Director of the school who lectured a few classes a week.
