= Zavala, Mozambique =

Zavala
- Location within Mozambique
- Coordinates: 24°41′S 34°40′E
- Country: Mozambique
- Province: Inhambane
- District: Zavala

Zavala, also known as Quissico, is a city in Mozambique. It is the capital of the Zavala District.

The town lies on the Mozambique Channel coast and the EN1 road. It is known for its lagoons and for its musicianship.

The Chopi ethnic group is numerous in Zavala. Famous people from Zavala include Alexandre José Maria dos Santos, a Cardinal who was Archbishop of Maputo; and the artist Kester.

== See also ==
- Chopi
