= Javier López Zavala =

Mexican politician

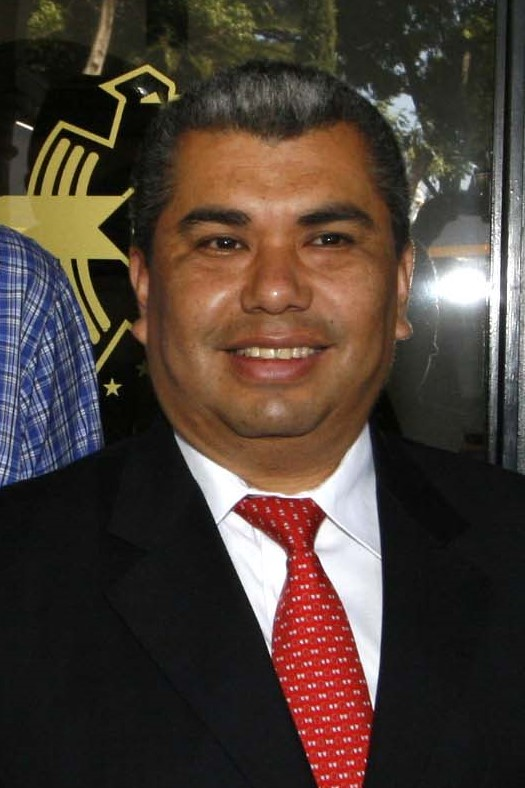
- Born: 9 January 1969 (age 57); Tonalá, Chiapas, Mexico
- Occupation: Politician
- Political party: PRI

Javier López Zavala (Note: In this Spanish name, the first or paternal surname is López and the second or maternal family name is Zavala.) (born 9 January 1969) is a Mexican politician affiliated with the Institutional Revolutionary Party (PRI).

López Zavala was born in Tonalá, Chiapas, in 1969 and holds a law degree from the Autonomous University of Puebla (BUAP).

From 2002 to 2005 he sat in the Congress of Puebla. Between 2005 and 2010 he served in the cabinet of Governor of Puebla Mario Marín Torres. In the 2010 state election, he contended for the governorship of Puebla for the PRI, but lost to Rafael Moreno Valle Rosas of a coalition led by the National Action Party (PAN).

In the 2012 general election, he was elected to a plurinominal seat in the Chamber of Deputies for the duration of the 62nd Congress.

He was arrested on 6 June 2022 in Puebla for the femicide of the lawyer and activist Cecilia Monzón, his former partner and mother of his child, and, on 31 December 2025, was sentenced to a 60-year prison term.

== See also ==
- es:Elecciones estatales de Puebla de 2010
- es:Ley Monzón
