= Vilankulo =

Vilankulo Vilanculos
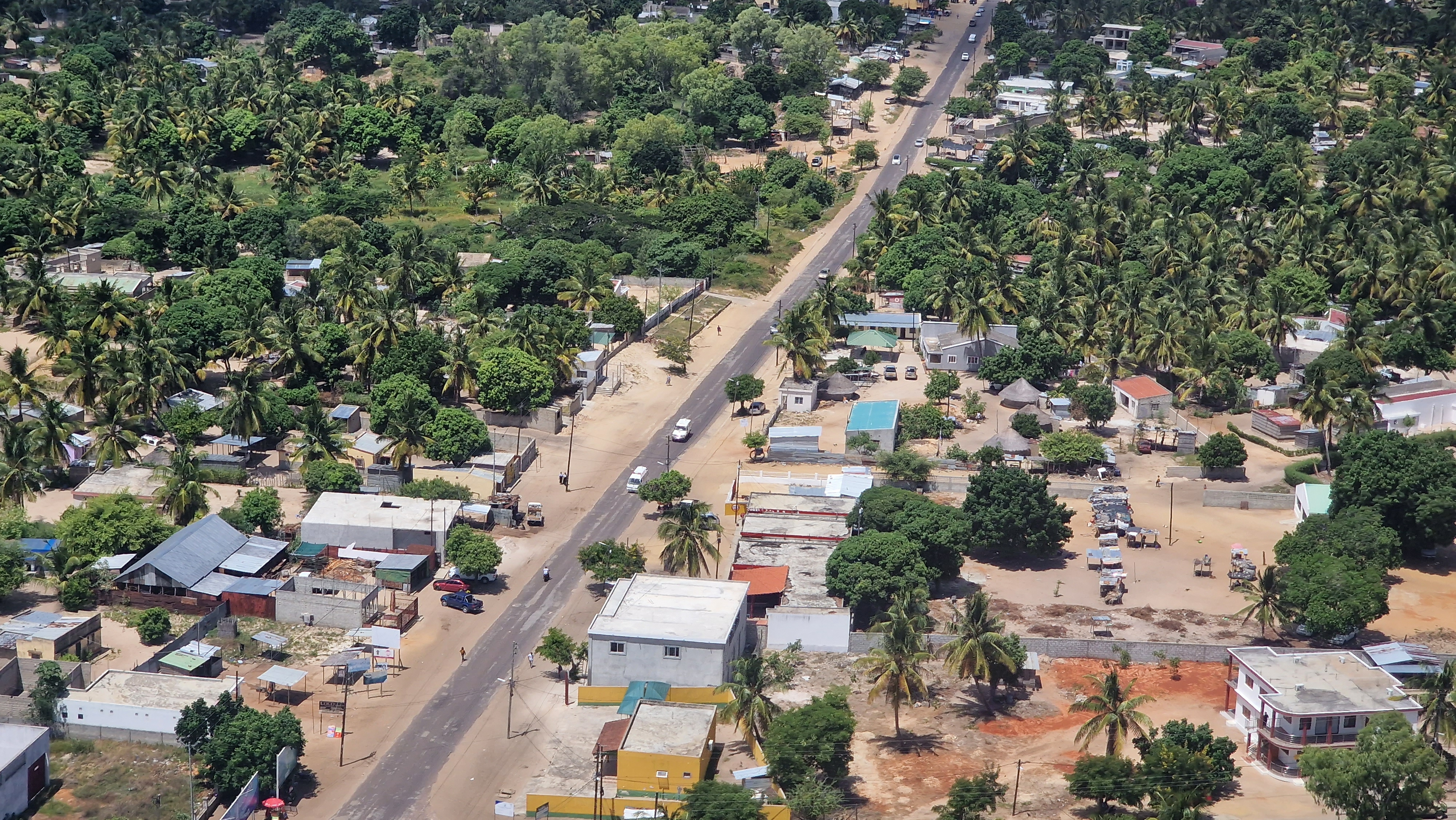
- Market in Vilankulo

- Location within Mozambique
- Coordinates: 22°0′S 35°19′E
- Country: Mozambique
- Provinces: Inhambane Province
- District: Vilanculos District

Government
  - Type: Democratic

Population (2010 (estimate))
  - Total: 24,433

Vilankulo (or Vilanculos) is a coastal town in Mozambique, lying in the Vilanculos District of Inhambane Province. Vilankulo is named after local tribal chief Gamela Vilankulo Mukoke, and some of the "bairros" (suburbs) are named after his sons. Known as Vilanculos during colonial times, the name was changed to Vilankulo at independence. Today the district is called Vilanculos and the town Vilankulo.

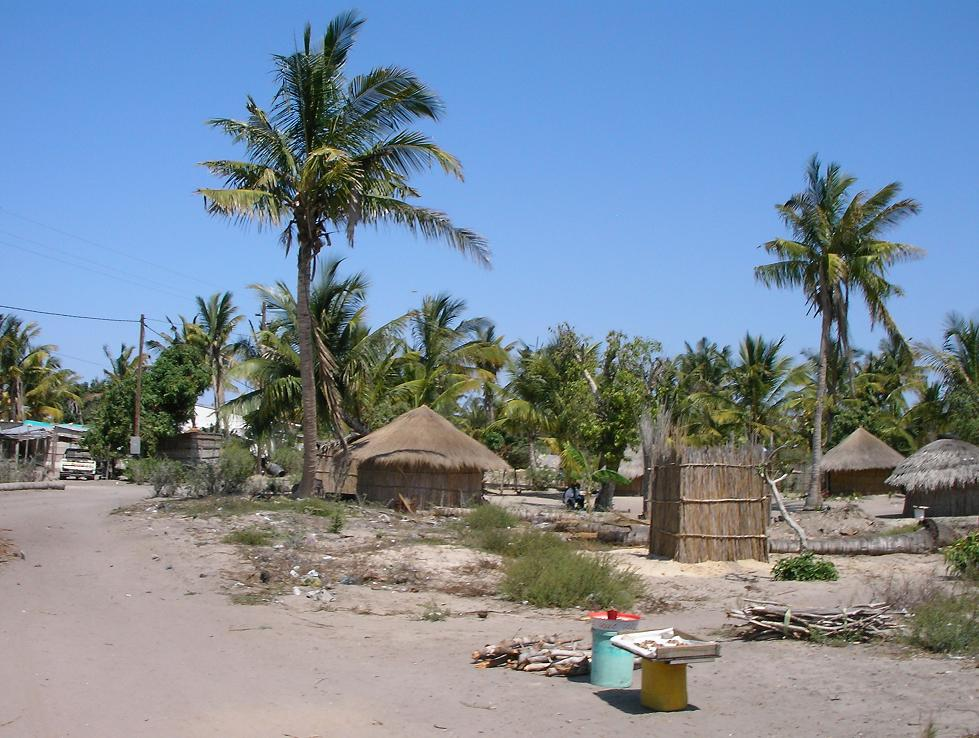
Typical homes and streets in Vilankulo

Vilankulo has been growing extensively over the last decade, and has been the recipient of considerable inward investment into its tourism infrastructure. The town of Vilankulo is the gateway to the archipelago. Dhows and helicopters travel between the town and the Bazaruto Archipelago. The town itself is only about 5 km long. The airport is based on the outside of the town with flights arriving and departing on a daily basis.

It is home to a new international airport, which serves daily flights to several regional destinations, including Johannesburg and Maputo.

== Sports ==
The local football club is called Vilankulo F.C. (VFC). This is the first official club from Vilankulo that is recognized by the Mozambican Football Federation. In November 2009, Vilankulo FC was promoted to the Moçambola.

Vilankulo is the gateway to the Bazaruto Archipelago, which offers ocean safaris, scuba diving, snorkeling, PADI diving courses and boat tours.

== Demographics ==
Year	Population
2010 estimate	24,433

== Climate ==
Climate data for Vilanculos (1961–1990)
Month	Jan	Feb	Mar	Apr	May	Jun	Jul	Aug	Sep	Oct	Nov	Dec	Year
Mean daily maximum °C (°F)	30.8 (87.4)	30.9 (87.6)	30.7 (87.3)	29.3 (84.7)	27.4 (81.3)	25.7 (78.3)	25.2 (77.4)	25.8 (78.4)	27.0 (80.6)	28.0 (82.4)	29.1 (84.4)	30.1 (86.2)	28.3 (83.0)
Mean daily minimum °C (°F)	23.5 (74.3)	23.1 (73.6)	22.3 (72.1)	20.0 (68.0)	16.9 (62.4)	14.6 (58.3)	14.2 (57.6)	15.5 (59.9)	18.2 (64.8)	20.3 (68.5)	22.0 (71.6)	23.1 (73.6)	19.5 (67.1)
Average rainfall mm (inches)	152.2 (5.99)	160.4 (6.31)	79.7 (3.14)	41.0 (1.61)	36.3 (1.43)	23.7 (0.93)	17.5 (0.69)	23.4 (0.92)	9.1 (0.36)	40.1 (1.58)	58.5 (2.30)	138.0 (5.43)	779.9 (30.69)
Average rainy days	9	10	9	6	6	6	6	4	3	5	6	9	79
Source: World Meteorological Organization

== Gallery ==
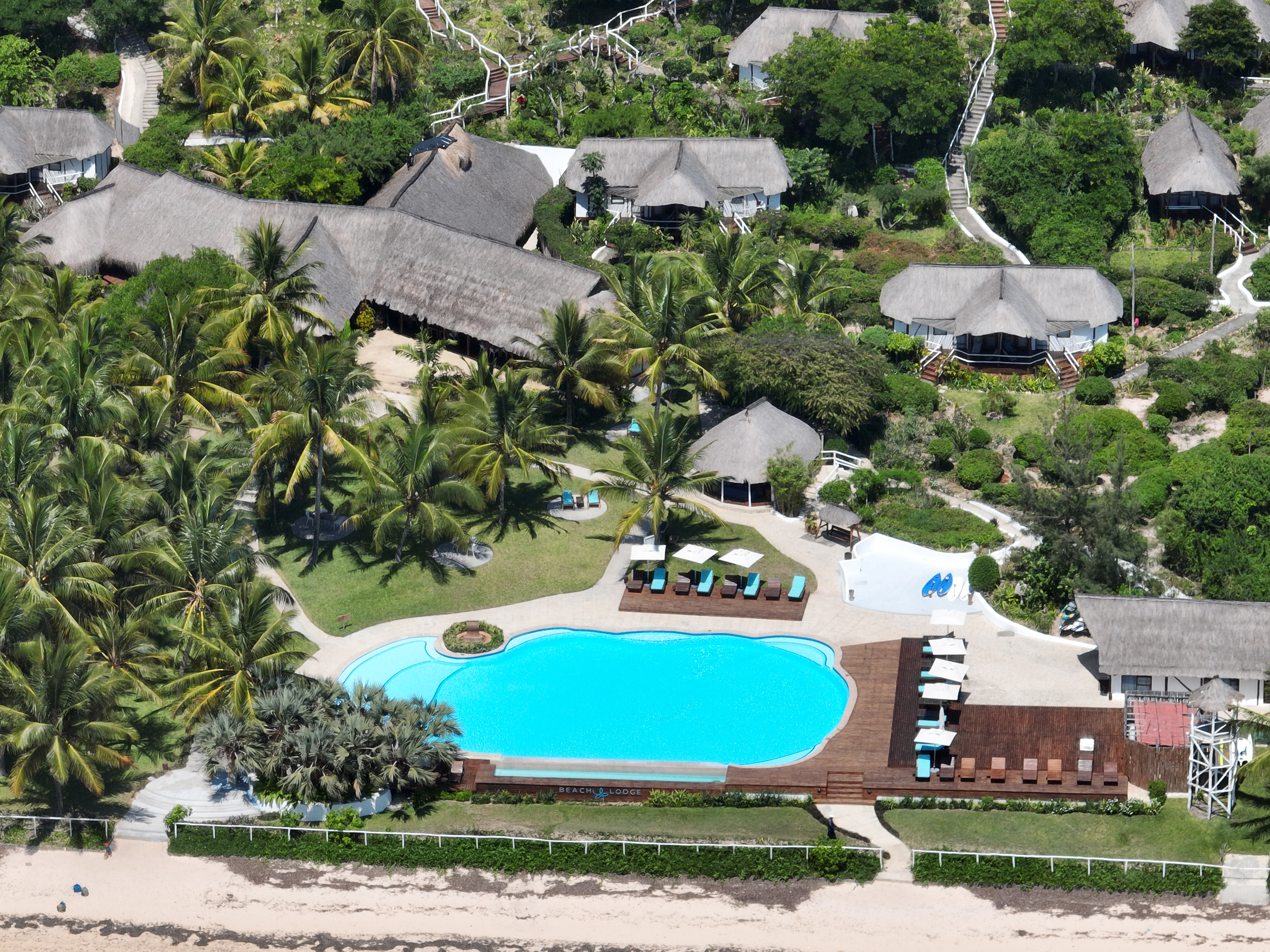
Aerial view of a beach-lodge and coastline at Vilankulo.

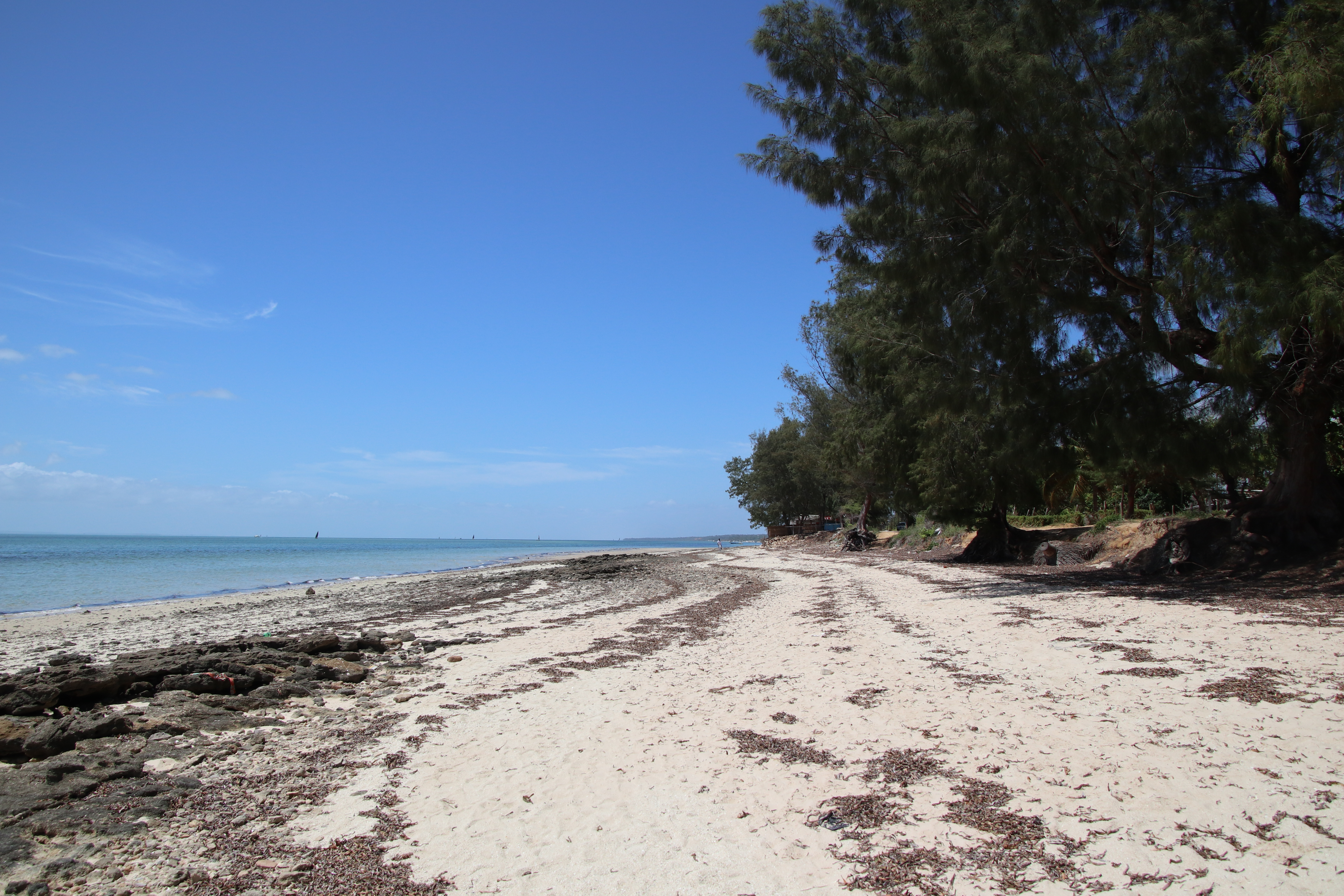
Vilanculos beach

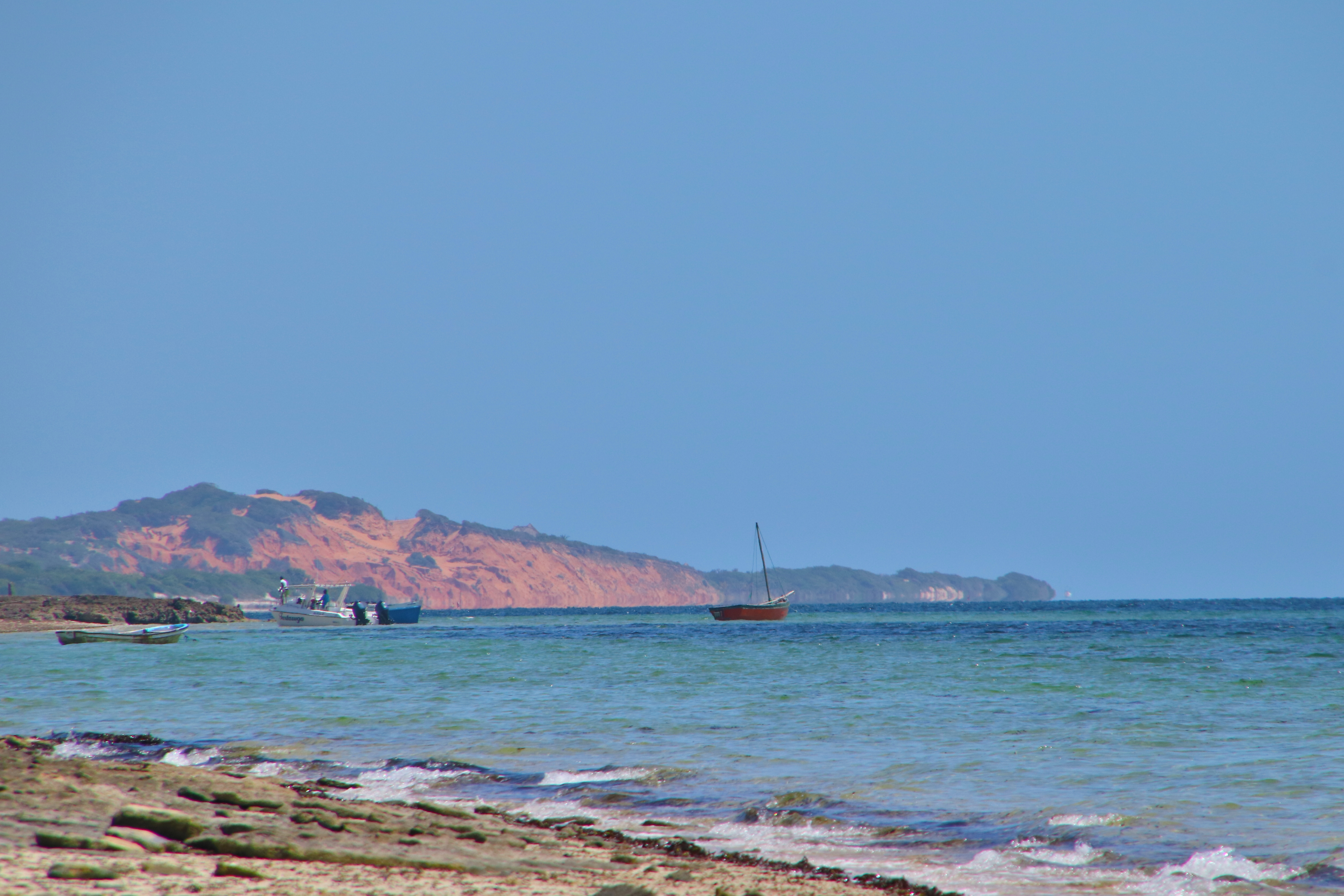
Scene at Vilanculos beach

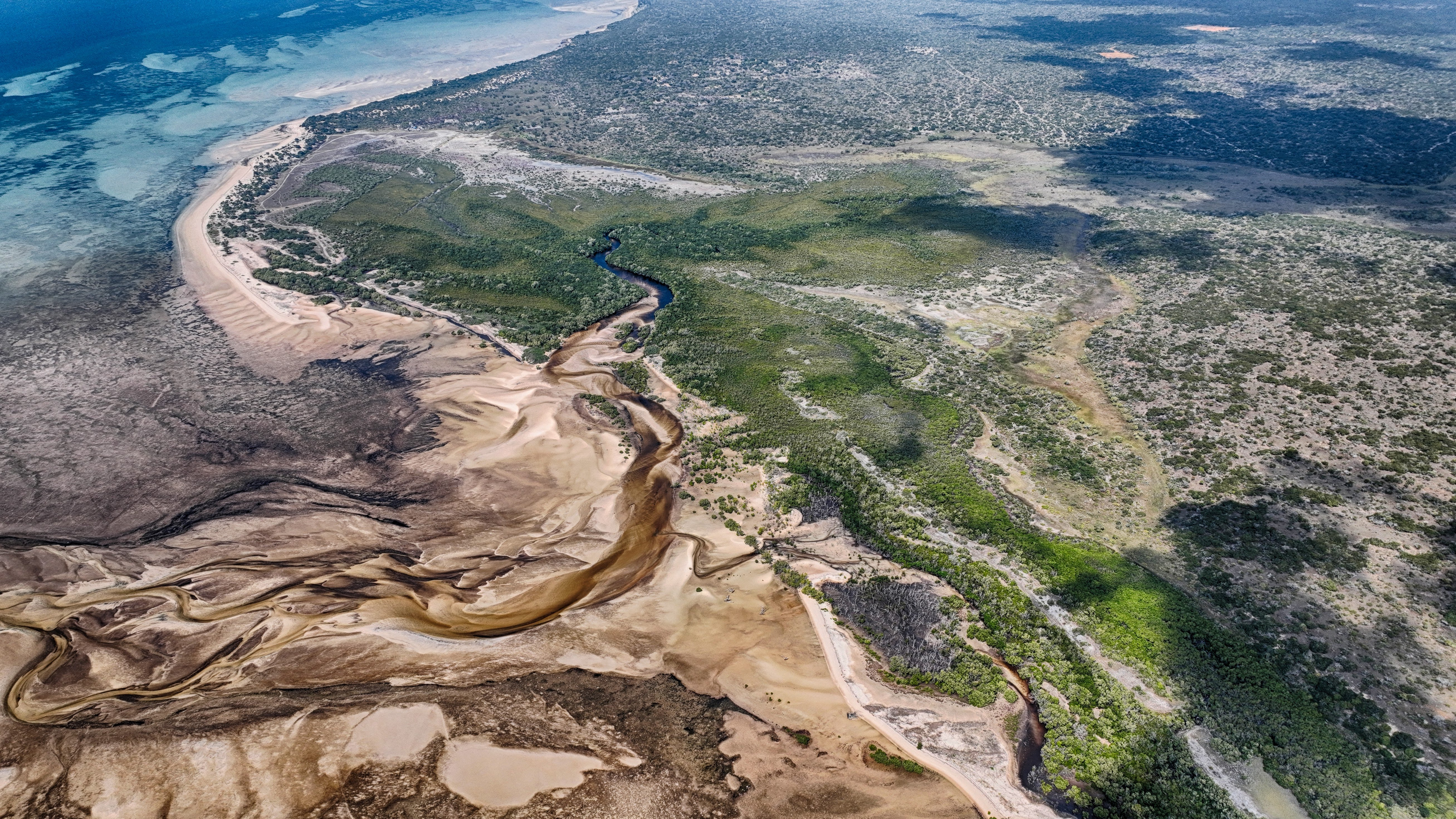

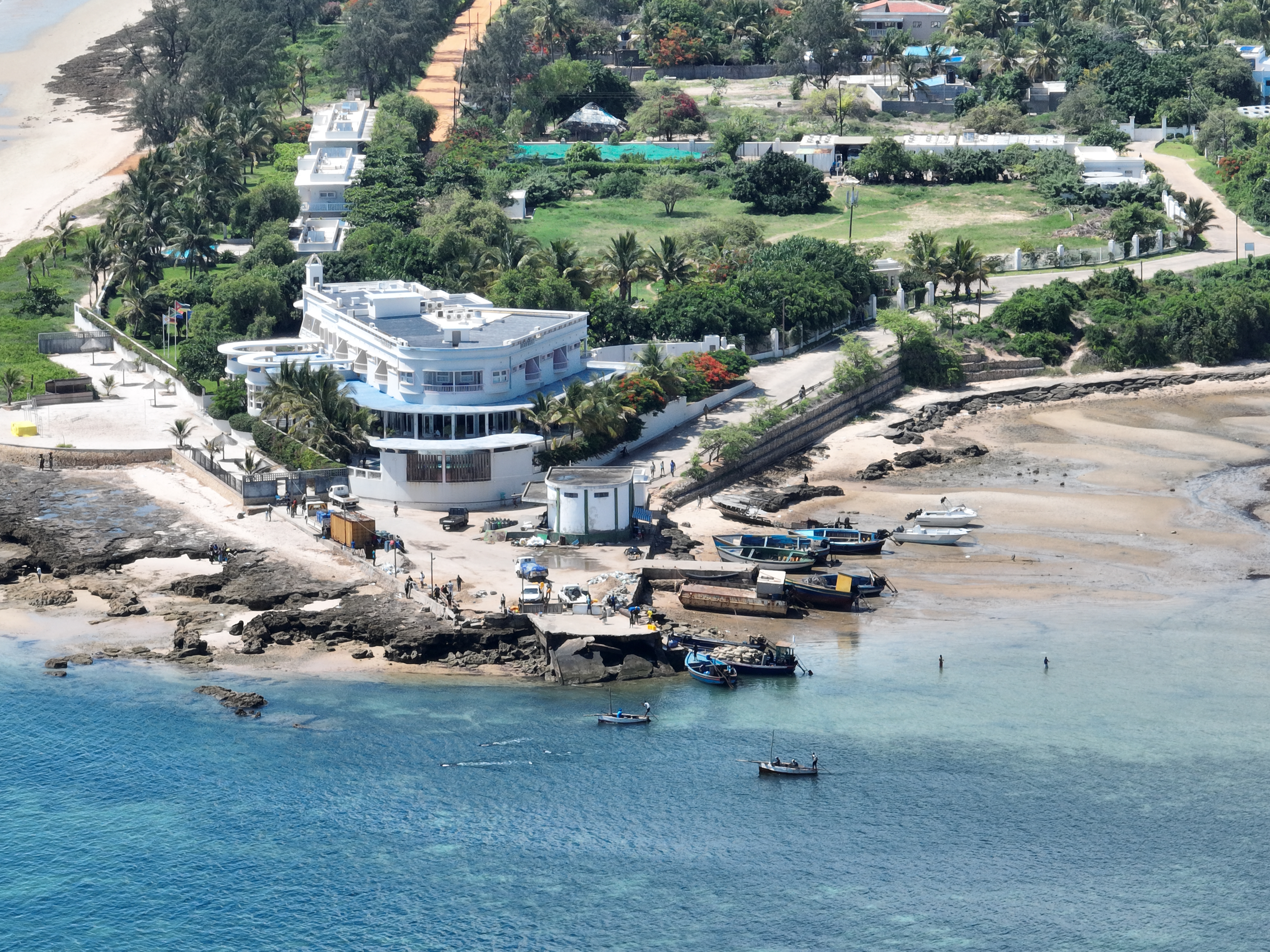

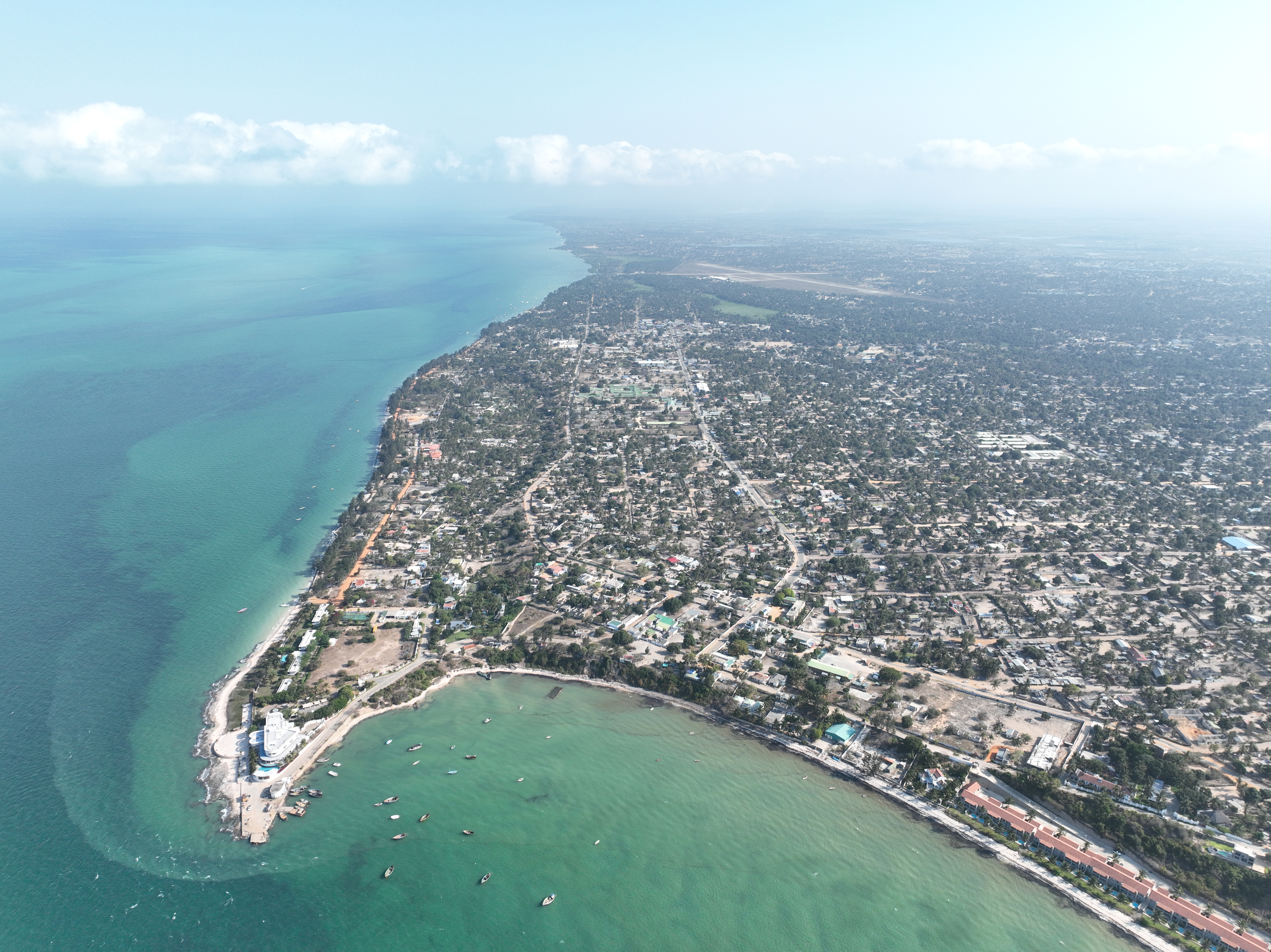

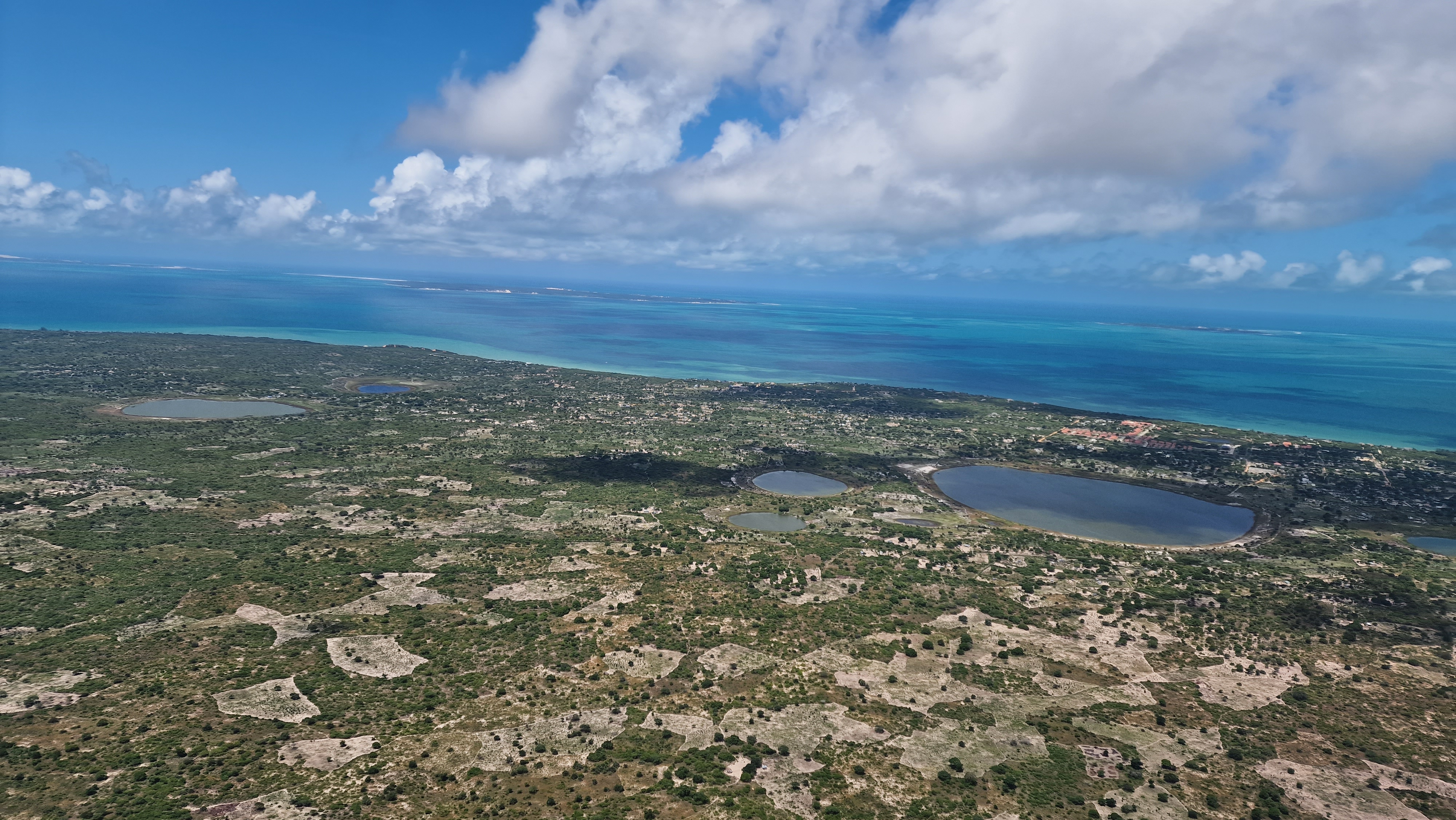

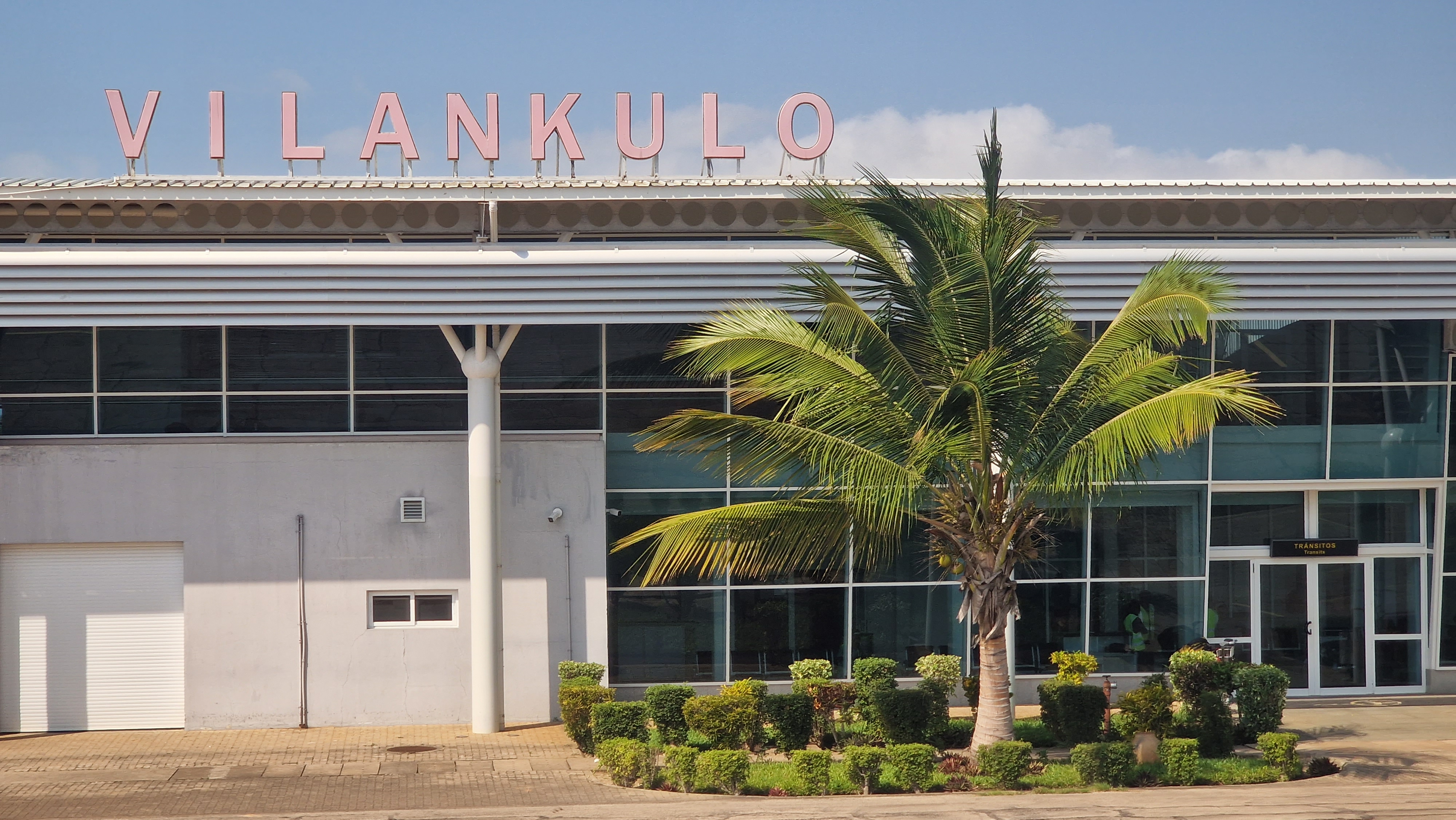

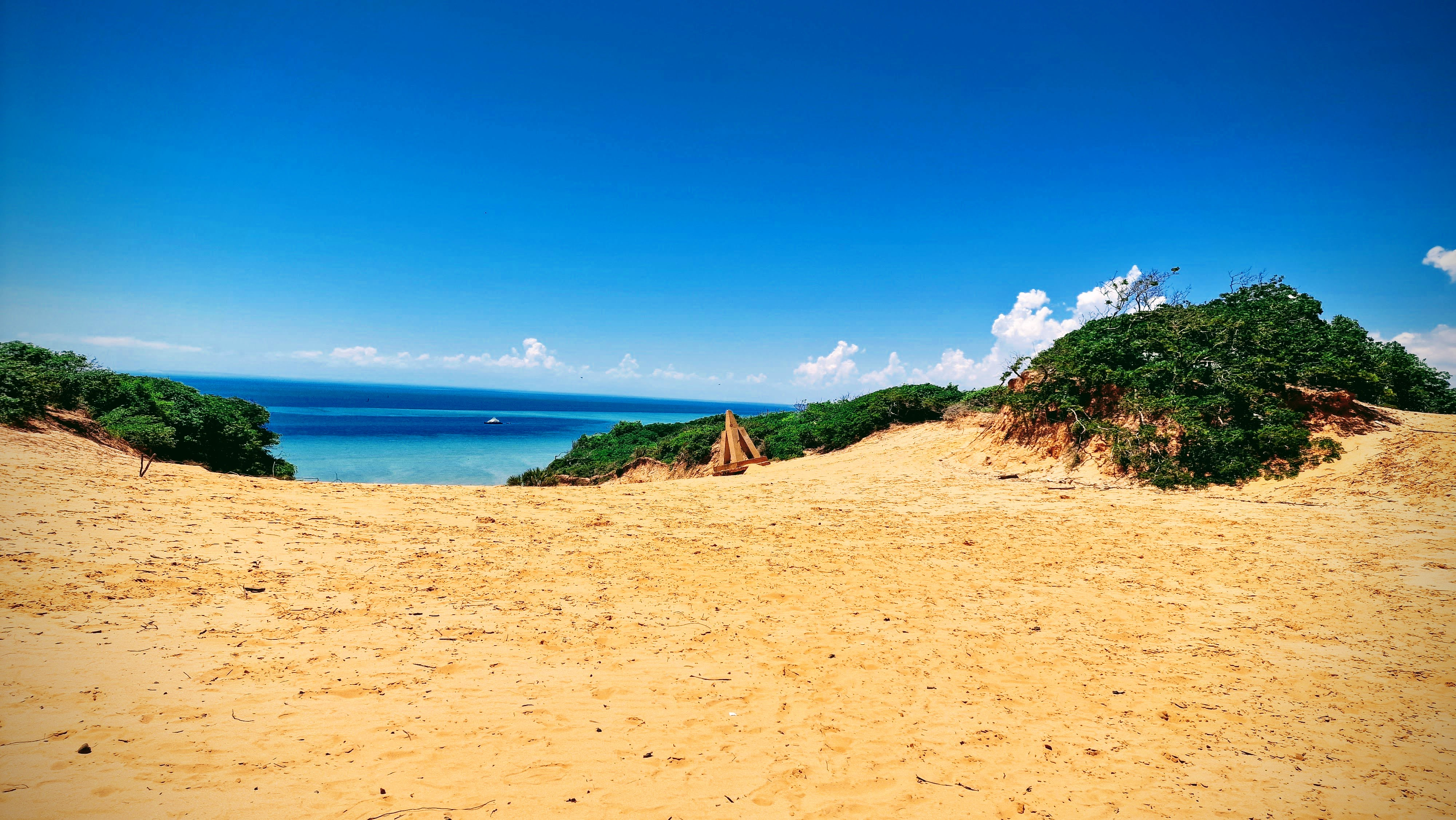
The red dunes

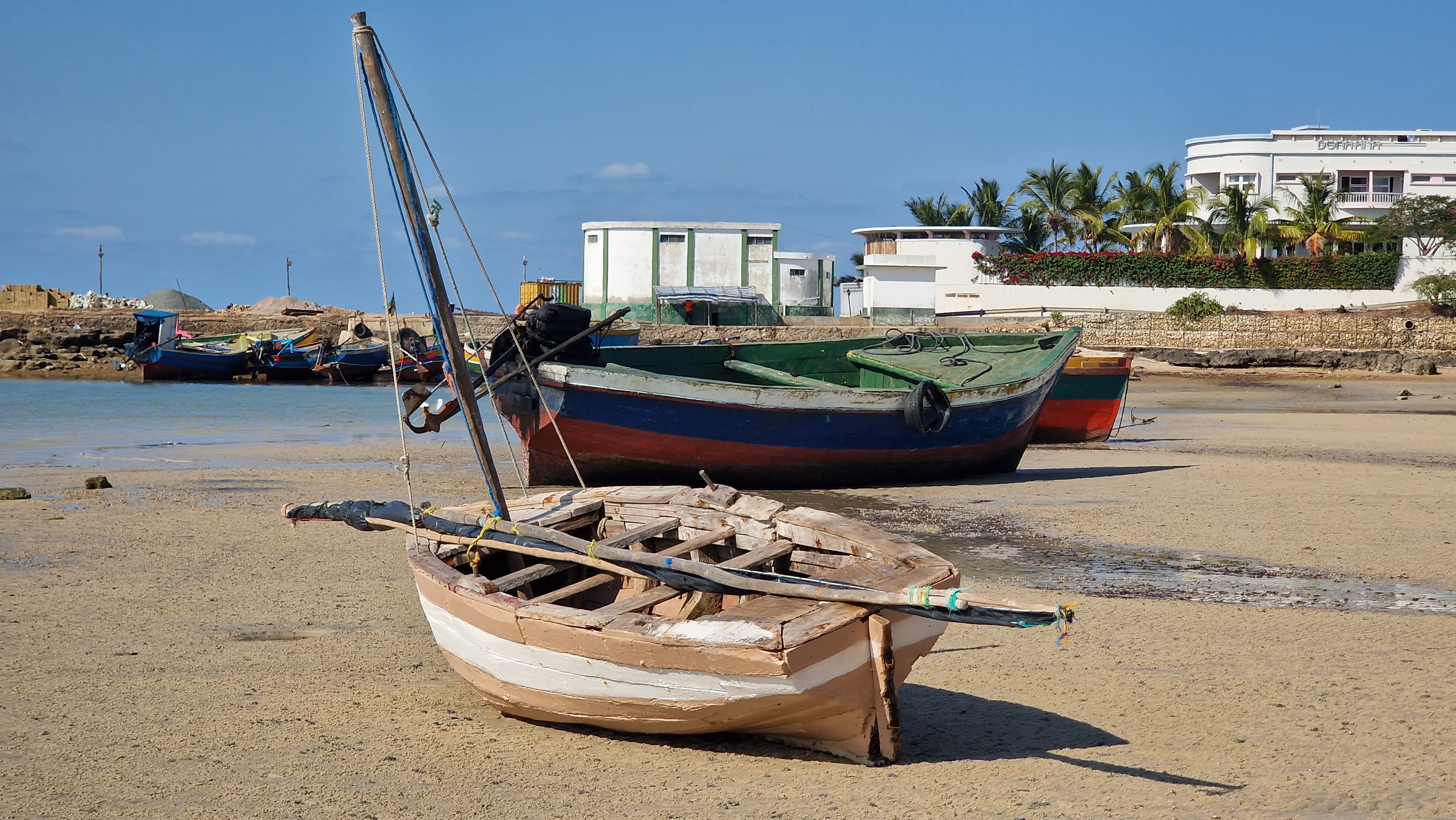
Traditional boat in Vilanculos
