= Dani Zavala =

American-born Guamanian footballer

Personal information
- Full name: Danielle Ashley Zavala
- Date of birth: 16 April 1990 (age 36)
- Place of birth: Santa Clara, California, United States
- Height: 1.70 m (5 ft 7 in)
- Position: Defender

Youth career
- Redondo Union High School

College career
Years	Team	Apps	(Gls)
2008–2009	Penn State Nittany Lions	2+	(0+)

International career^{‡}
2016	Guam	3	(0)
- ‡ National team caps and goals as of 14 November 2016

Danielle Ashley Zavala (born 16 April 1990) is an American-born Guamanian former footballer who played as a defender. She has been a member of the Guam women's national team.

== Early life ==
Zavala was raised in El Camino Village, California.
