= Craveirinha =

Craveirinha is a surname. Notable people with the surname include:

- José Craveirinha (1922–2003), Mozambican journalist, story writer, and poet
- Stelio Craveirinha (1950–2020), Mozambican athlete
