= Isidro Camarillo Zavala =

Mexican politician

- Born: 28 May 1951 (age 74); Baja California Sur, Mexico
- Occupation: Politician
- Political party: PAN

Isidro Camarillo Zavala (born 28 May 1951) is a Mexican politician formerly affiliated with the National Action Party. As of 2014 he served as Deputy of the LIX Legislature of the Mexican Congress as a plurinominal representative.
