= Inhambane Province =

Province of Mozambique

Coordinates: 23°0′S 34°30′E

Inhambane
- Province
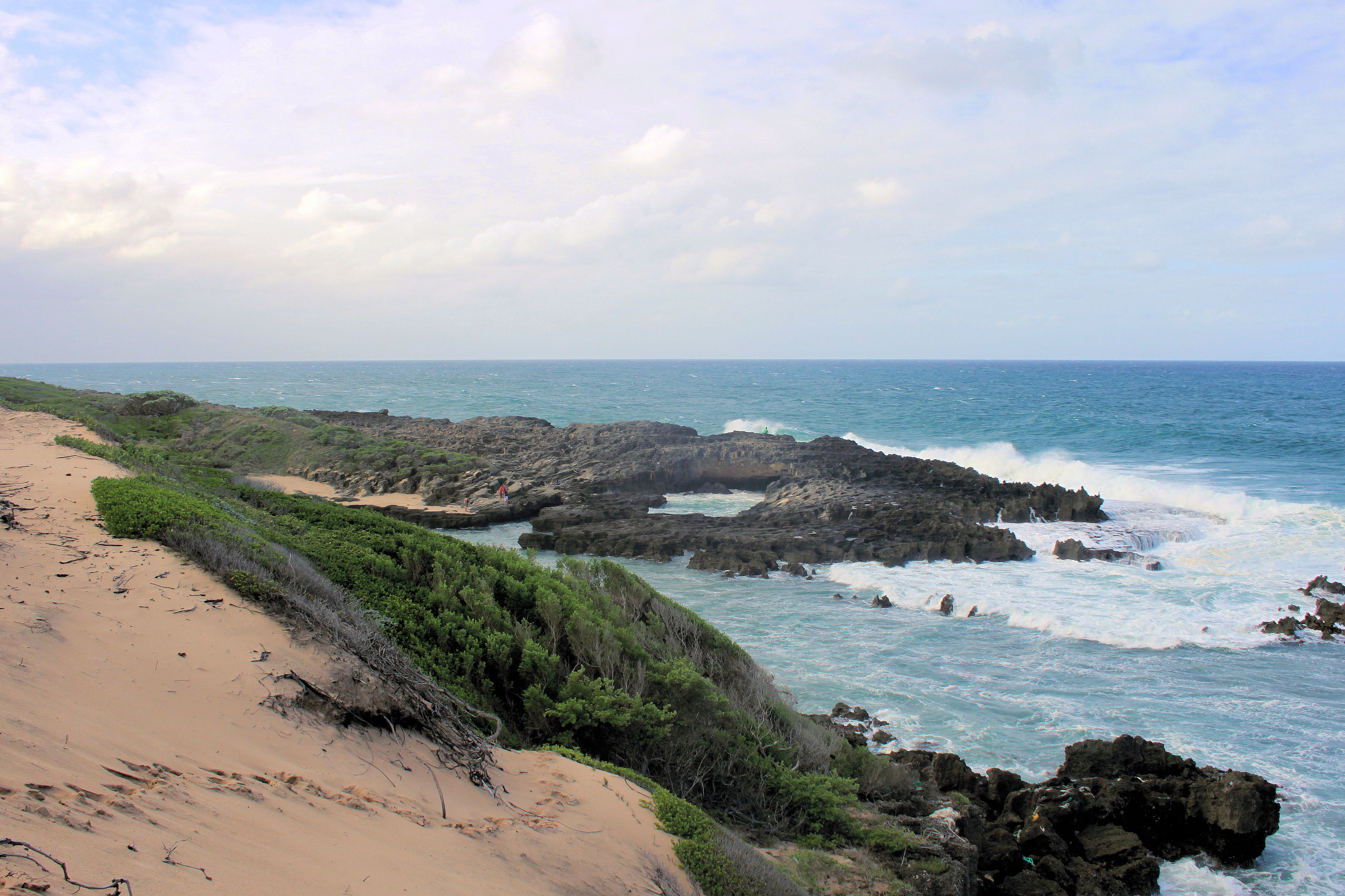

- Inhambane, Province of Mozambique
- Country: Mozambique
- Capital: Inhambane

Government
  - Governor: Eduardo Mussanhane

Area
  - Total: 68,775 km^{2} (26,554 sq mi)

Population (2017 census)
  - Total: 1,488,676
  - Density: 21.646/km^{2} (56.062/sq mi)
- Postal code: 13xx
- Area code: (+258) 293
- HDI (2019): 0.478 low · 5th of 11
- Website: www.inhambane.gov.mz

Inhambane [iɲɐ̃ˈbani] is a province of Mozambique located on the coast in the southern part of the country. It has an area of 68,615 km^{2} and a population of 1,488,676 (2017 census). The provincial capital is also called Inhambane.

The climate is tropical throughout, more humid along the coast and dryer inland. The coast has a number of mangrove swamps.

The town of Inhambane existed in the 10th century, and was the southernmost port used by Arabs for slave trading. The region was visited by Vasco da Gama in 1498, who claimed Inhambane Bay for Portugal. The Portuguese established a trading post at Inhambane in 1534.

The province is the second largest grower of cashews (after Nampula), and also produces coconut and citrus fruit (inspiring Mozambique's most famous poet Craveirinha to write of "The Tasty Tangerines of Inhambane"). The long coastline supports much fishing. The Inhambane Bay area is of some interest for tourism, with a number of beaches, and one of the last remaining populations of dugong in Mozambique.

== Districts ==
Inhambane Province is divided into 14 districts:

- Inhambane District
- Maxixe District
- Funhalouro District
- Govuro District
- Homoine District
- Jangamo District
- Inharrime District
- Inhassoro District
- Mabote District
- Massinga District
- Morrumbene District
- Panda District
- Vilanculos District
- Zavala District

The province has six municipalities, including:

- Inhambane provincial capital
- Maxixe largest population, and the province's economic capital
- Vilanculos
- Zavala
- Homoíne
- Massinga

== Culture ==
Inhambane is famous for its music, in particular the timbila (xylophone ensemble) of the Chopi ethnic group.

== Geography ==
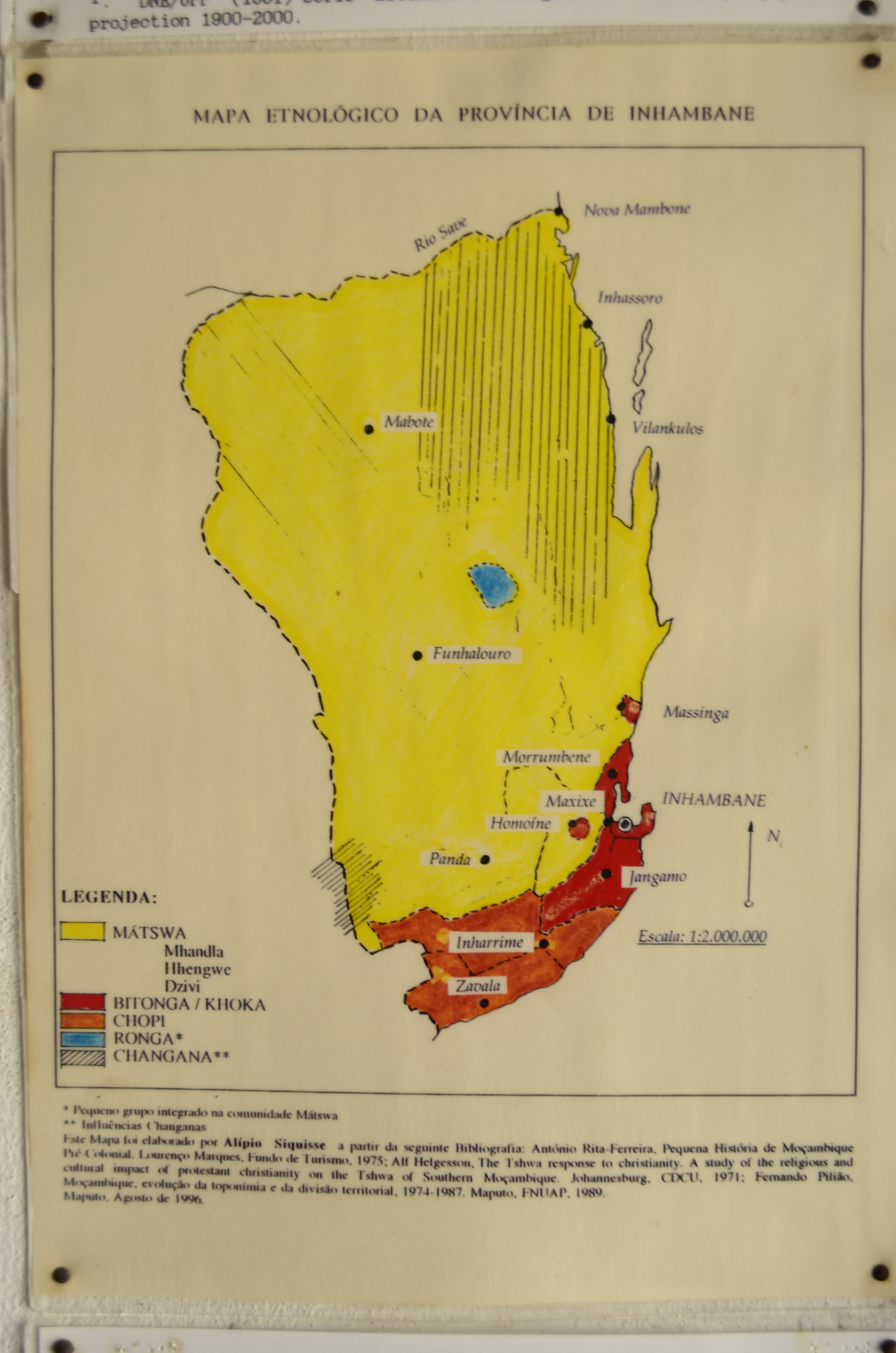
Ethnographic map of Inhambane Province

The province has two of the Mozambique's national parks: Zinave National Park in the northwest and Bazaruto National Park on the Bazaruto Archipelago in the Indian Ocean, in the northeast of the province, as well as the Pomene National Reserve.

=== Transportation ===
The province is served by Inhambane Airport, in Jangamo District.

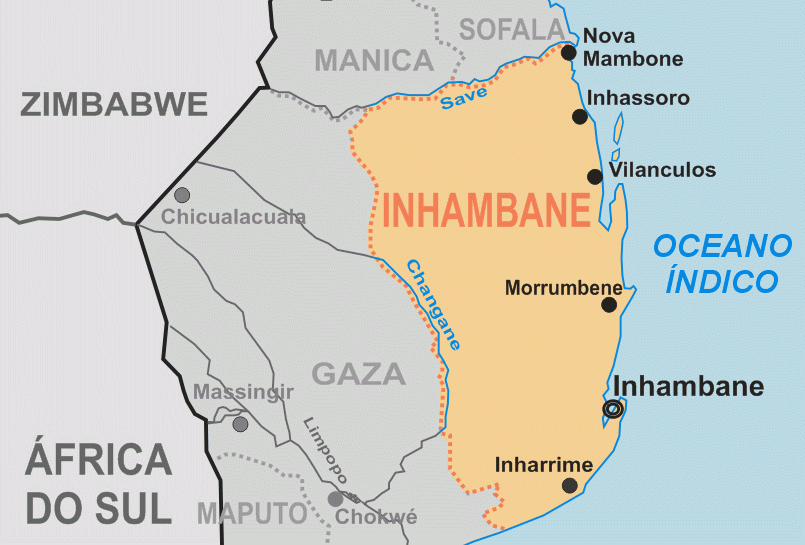
Provincial map

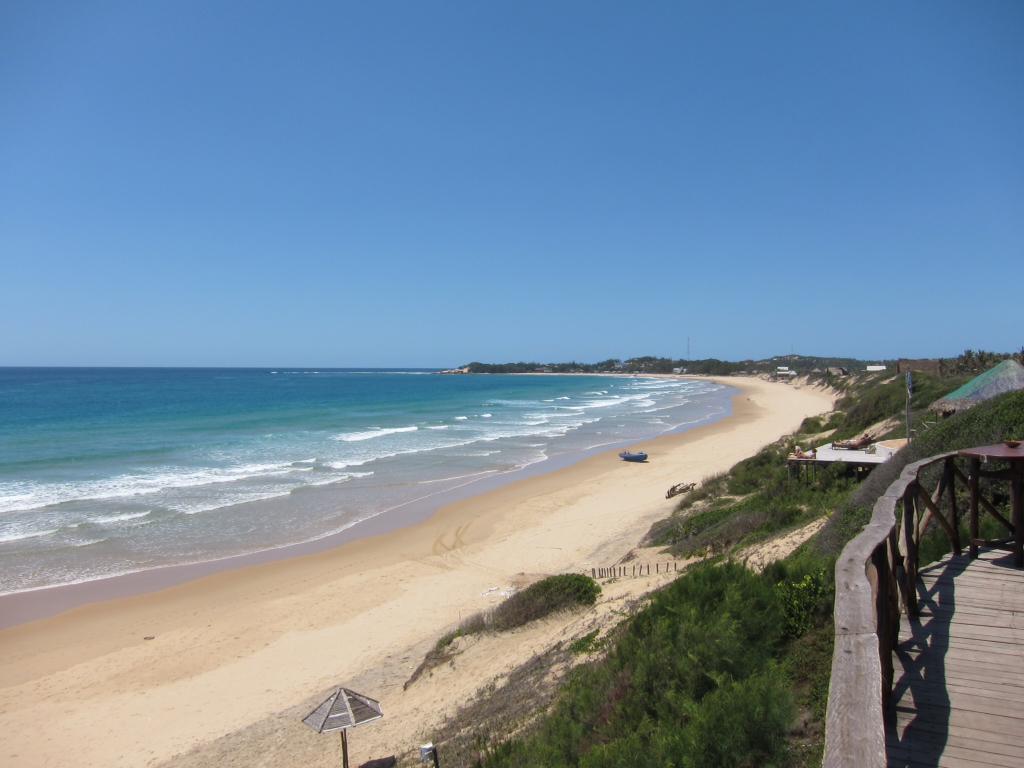
Beach in Tofo, Mozambique

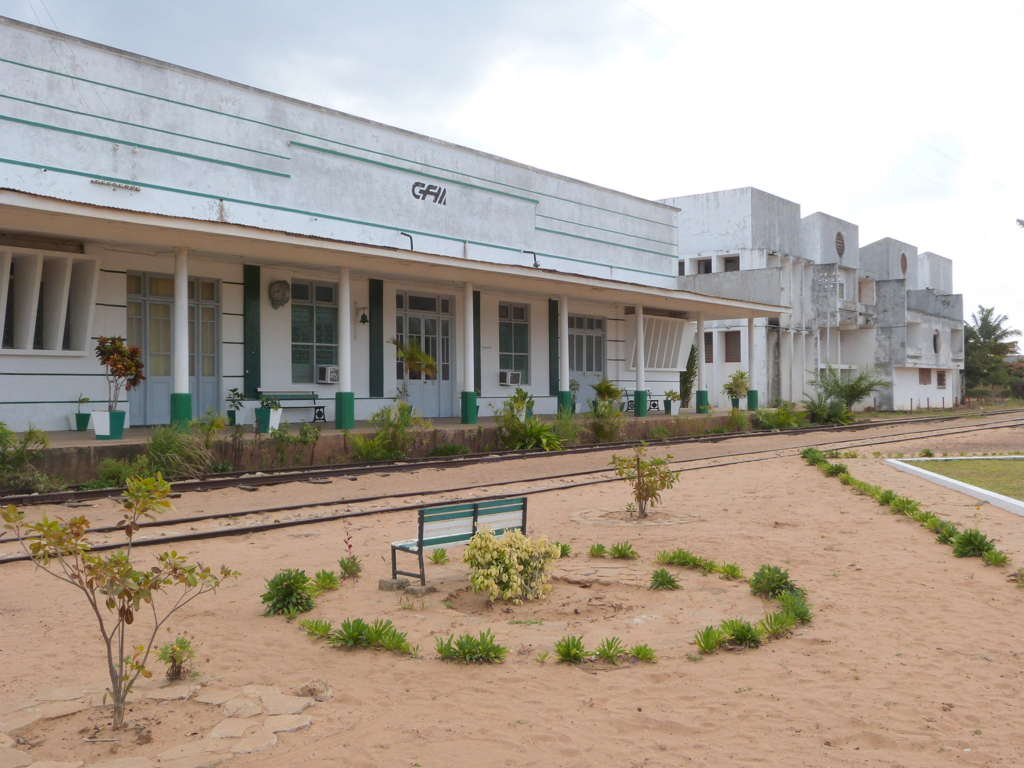
Inhambane train station

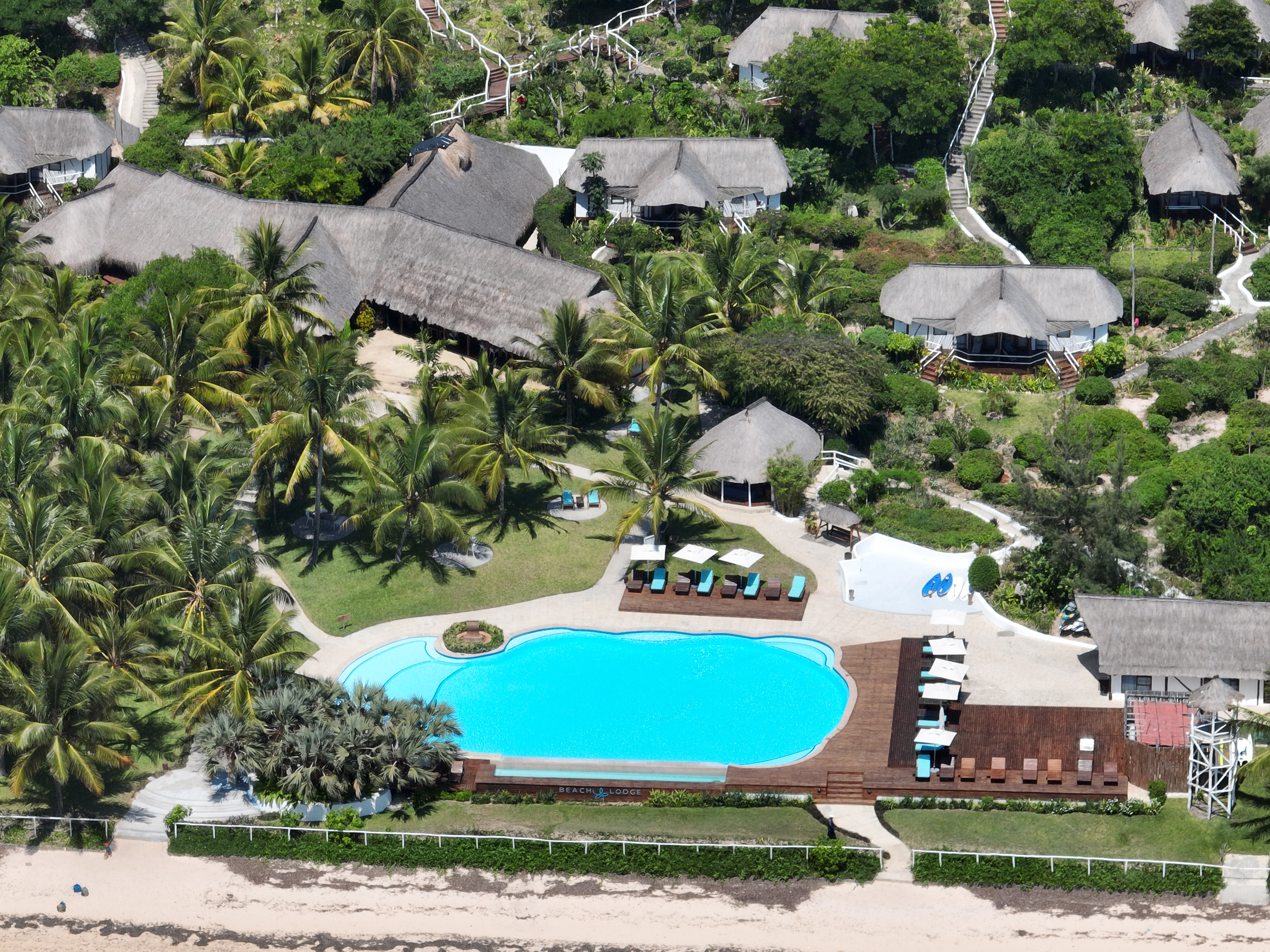
Aerial view of a beach-lodge and coastline at Vilankulo, Mozambique

== See also ==
- Postage stamps and postal history of Inhambane
- Secondary School of Doane
