= Changane River =

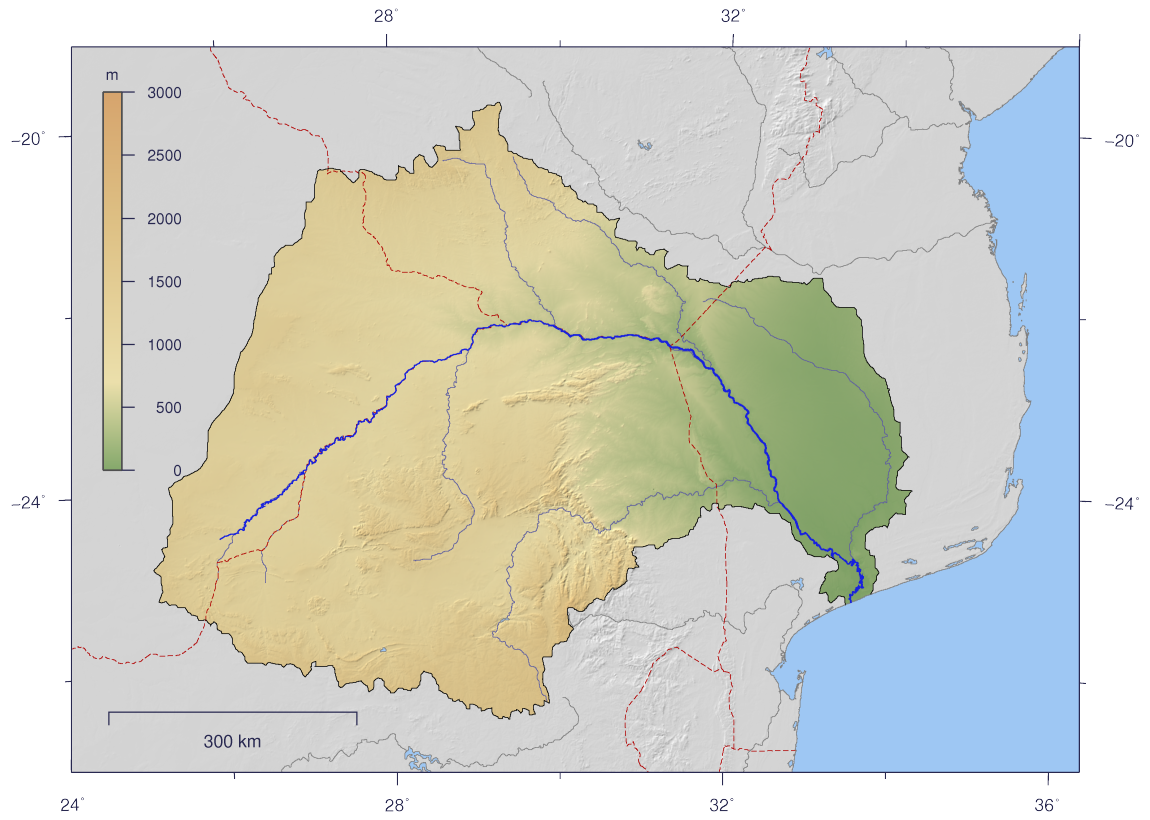
- Course and Watershed of the Limpopo River.

Location
- Country: Mozambique

Physical characteristics
- Source
  - elevation: 552 m (1,811 ft)
- Mouth: Limpopo River
  - elevation: 13 m (43 ft)
- Basin size: 65,570.55 km^{2} (25,316.93 sq mi)

Basin features
- Tributaries
  - right: Buabuassi, Chingovo, Panzene, Sangutane, Chichacuarre

Location of the Changane River's mouth

The Changane River (Rio Changane) is a river in Mozambique, a tributary to the Limpopo River which it joins near the coast, just past the town of Chibuto. It forms part of the eastern boundary of Gaza Province. The Changane is the easternmost tributary of the Limpopo, entering it from the left near its mouth on the Indian Ocean.

== Geography ==
The Changane and its main tributaries rise close to the border with Zimbabwe. The river runs southwards roughly along the 34°E line of longitude from about 22°S to about 24°S latitude. The river drains the wetlands of Banhine National Park. The basin covers 6,557,055 hectares (25,316.93 sq mi), or about 15.9% of the Limpopo Basin. The river mainly flows through a dry region. In the interior, annual rainfall is as low as 400 millimetres (16 in), rising to 800 millimetres (31 in) near the coast. The Changane River Valley is near sea level, and was once a beach line. The Changane has a very low runoff coefficient and long periods with no discharge at all.

== Ecology ==
The Changane Valley holds scattered saline wetlands and seasonally flooded grasslands with islands of Acacia nilotica kraussiana. It is usually semi-arid, but in the late 1990s rainfall increased dramatically, causing widespread and devastating flooding. 500 millimetres (20 in) of rain fell in only 3 days in March 2000. The more frequently flooded areas have higher salinity. They are dominated by salt-tolerant grasslands with extensive bare patches.

18 species of fish have been found in the Banhine National Park towards the north of the valley. The African lungfish, two killifish species and two Barbel species have developed ways to deal with drought, since the wetlands are sometimes completely dry on the surface. The Banhine National Park used to be home to buffalo, sable, tsessebe, hartebeest, zebra, and wildebeest. Many of these animals were destroyed during the civil wars of the 1980s and early 1990s. However, the park is still home to endangered wattled cranes and to many migratory birds. Results of an aerial survey in October 2004 showed that the park had healthy populations of ostrich, kudu, impala, reedbuck, duiker, steenbok, porcupine, warthog and oribi.

== Human activity ==
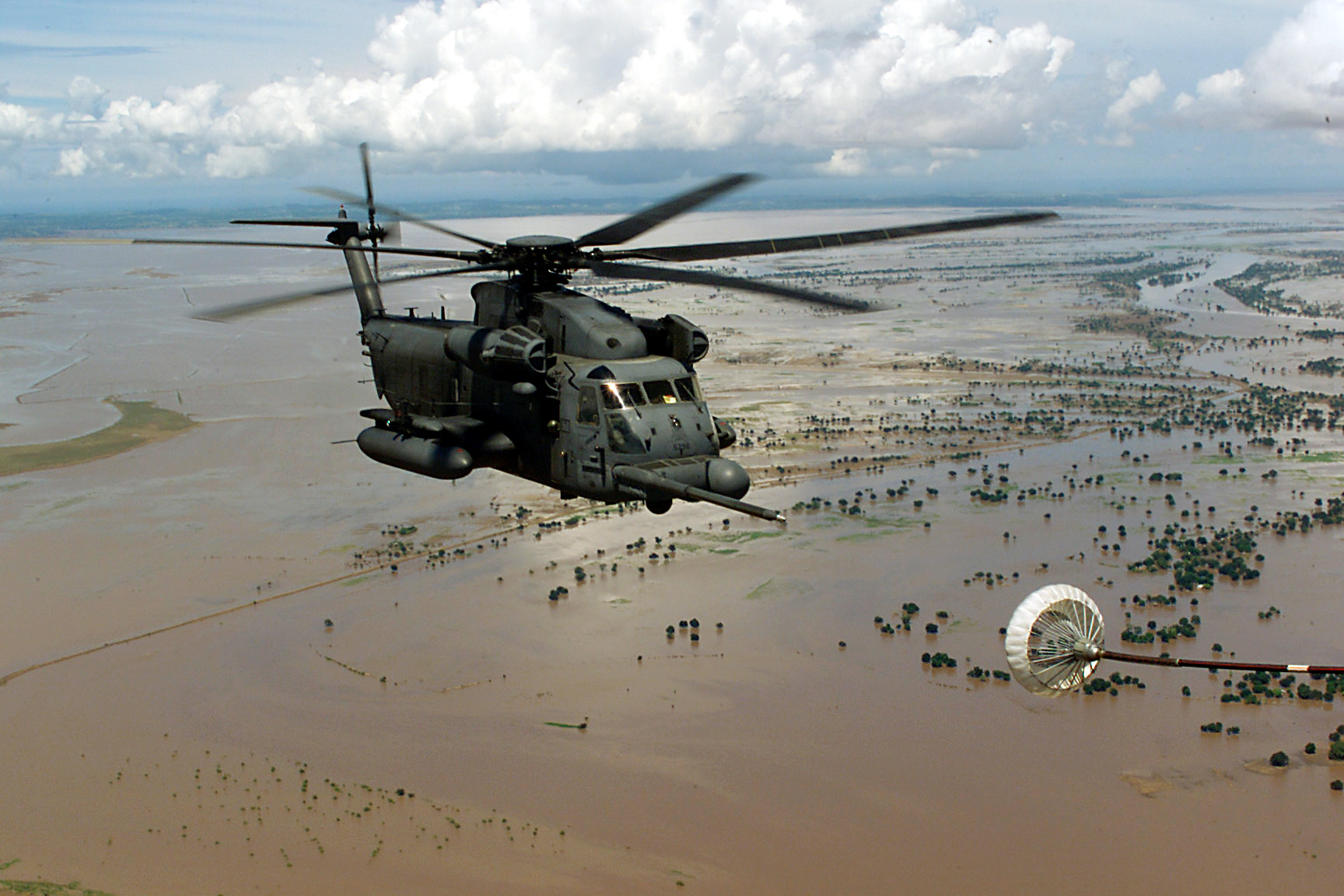
Helicopter over flooded Central Mozambique in 2000

The people of the area have faced a lengthy civil war, and must also cope with drought and occasional devastating floods. There is a small human population in the Banhine Park. They have been damaging the environment by slash-and-burn cultivation of maize, sorghum, cassava and sugar cane. With drought, the crops fail and the people revert to hunting and fishing, placing stress on the fauna. The government is encouraging people to move out of the park by building permanent water sources outside of the reserve and giving incentives to those who move.

The Chibuto District lies in the floodplain of the Changane River near Chibuto city. In this part of the river basin average rainfall is around 200 millimetres (7.9 in) during the cold and dry season from April to September, and around 570 millimetres (22 in) in the hot and humid season from October to March. The people are poor, with 50% below the poverty line. They mainly live through subsistence agriculture, growing a mix of vegetables, banana, maize, and rice. They also graze cattle and make use of local reeds and grass for fiber products. The freshwater springs in the wetland are used for irrigation and domestic use.

Land use maps show that between 2001 and 2007 most of the shrubby marshlands in Chibuto have been gradually converted for use in agriculture in both the dry and wet seasons. The cause may in part be exceptionally dry conditions during this period. The local farmers also report an unsustainable growth in cattle on the land. The reed collectors report that reed are being burned to clear the land for farming, which may have serious long-term impact on the environment.

A study undertaken between November 2006 and January 2007 found that the river water did not meet the World Health Organization guidelines for drinking water quality. This may have been due in part to the effects of the wetlands that feed the river and to the natural occurrence of a river bed rich in ions due to natural geology of the area. However, contamination with coliforms (highest around Chibuto town) was clearly due to urban waste.
