= Chopi language =

Bantu language spoken in Mozambique

Chopi
- Chichopi
- Native to: Mozambique
- Native speakers: 1.1 million (2017)
- Language family: Niger–Congo?: Atlantic–Congo; Volta-Congo; Benue–Congo; Bantoid; Southern Bantoid; Bantu; Southern Bantu; Chopi (S.60)?; Chopi
- Dialects: Lenge

Language codes
- ISO 639-3: cce
- Glottolog: chop1243
- Guthrie code: S.61,611
- Linguasphere: 99-AUT-cc incl. varieties 99-AUT-cca...-ccd

Chopi (also spelled Copi, Tschopi, and Txopi), is a Bantu language spoken along the southern coast of Mozambique.

Maho (2009) lists the possibly extinct Lenge dialect as a distinct language.

== Phonology ==
=== Consonants ===
		Labial	Alveolar			Post- alveolar	Palatal	Velar	Glottal
		Labial	plain	whstld.	lateral	Post- alveolar	Palatal	Velar	Glottal
Click	voiceless					ᵏǃ			
Click	aspirated					ᵏǃʰ			
Click	voiced					ᶢǃ			
Click	prenasal vl.					ᵑǃᵏ			
Click	prenasal vd.					ᵑǃᶢ			
Nasal	plain	m	n				ɲ	ŋ	
Nasal	murmured	mʱ	nʱ				ɲʱ		
Plosive	voiceless	p	t					k	
Plosive	aspirated	pʰ	tʰ					kʰ	
Plosive	voiced	b	d				ɟ	ɡ	
Plosive	implosive	ɓ	ɗ				(ʄ)		
Plosive	prenasal	ᵐb	ⁿd					ᵑɡ	
Plosive	murmured/pren.	ᵐbʱ	ⁿdʱ					ᵑɡʱ	
Affricate	voiceless	p͡f	t͡s	t͡sᶲ	t͡ɬ	t͡ʃ			
Affricate	aspirated	p͡fʰ	t͡sʰ	t͡sᶲʰ	t͡ɬʰ	t͡ʃʰ			
Affricate	voiced	(b͡v)	d͡z	d͡zᵝ	d͡ɮ	d͡ʒ			
Affricate	prenasal	ᶬb͡v	ⁿd͡z	ⁿd͡zᵝ	ⁿd͡ɮ	ᶮd͡ʒ			
Affricate	murmured/pren.		ⁿd͡zʱ		ⁿd͡ɮʱ	ᶮd͡ʒʱ			
Fricative	voiceless	f	s	sᶲ	ɬ	ʃ			h
Fricative	voiced	v	z (Note: Voiced fricative sounds are heard mostly as realizations of voiced affricates among modern speakers)	zᵝ	ɮ	ʒ			
Rhotic			r						
Approximant	lateral				l				
Approximant	central	ʋ					j	w	

- Sounds /t͡sᶲ, t͡sᶲʰ, d͡zᵝ, ⁿd͡zᵝ/, are typically heard as labial-alveolar affricates [p͡sᶲ, p͡sᶲʰ, b͡zᵝ, ᵐb͡zᵝ], however in recent years there has been a shift in pronunciation having them pronounced purely as alveolar.
- Consonants when preceding /j, w/ are always either palatalized [Cʲ] or labialized [Cʷ].
- /ɟ/ may also be heard as an implosive [ʄ] in free variation.
- /v/ may also be heard as an affricate [b͡v] in free variation.

=== Vowels ===
	Front	Central	Back
Close	i		u
Mid	ɛ		ɔ
Open		a	

- Nasalized vowel sounds [Ṽ] may be heard when preceding nasal consonants.
