= Postos of Mozambique =

Administrative territorial entity of Mozambique

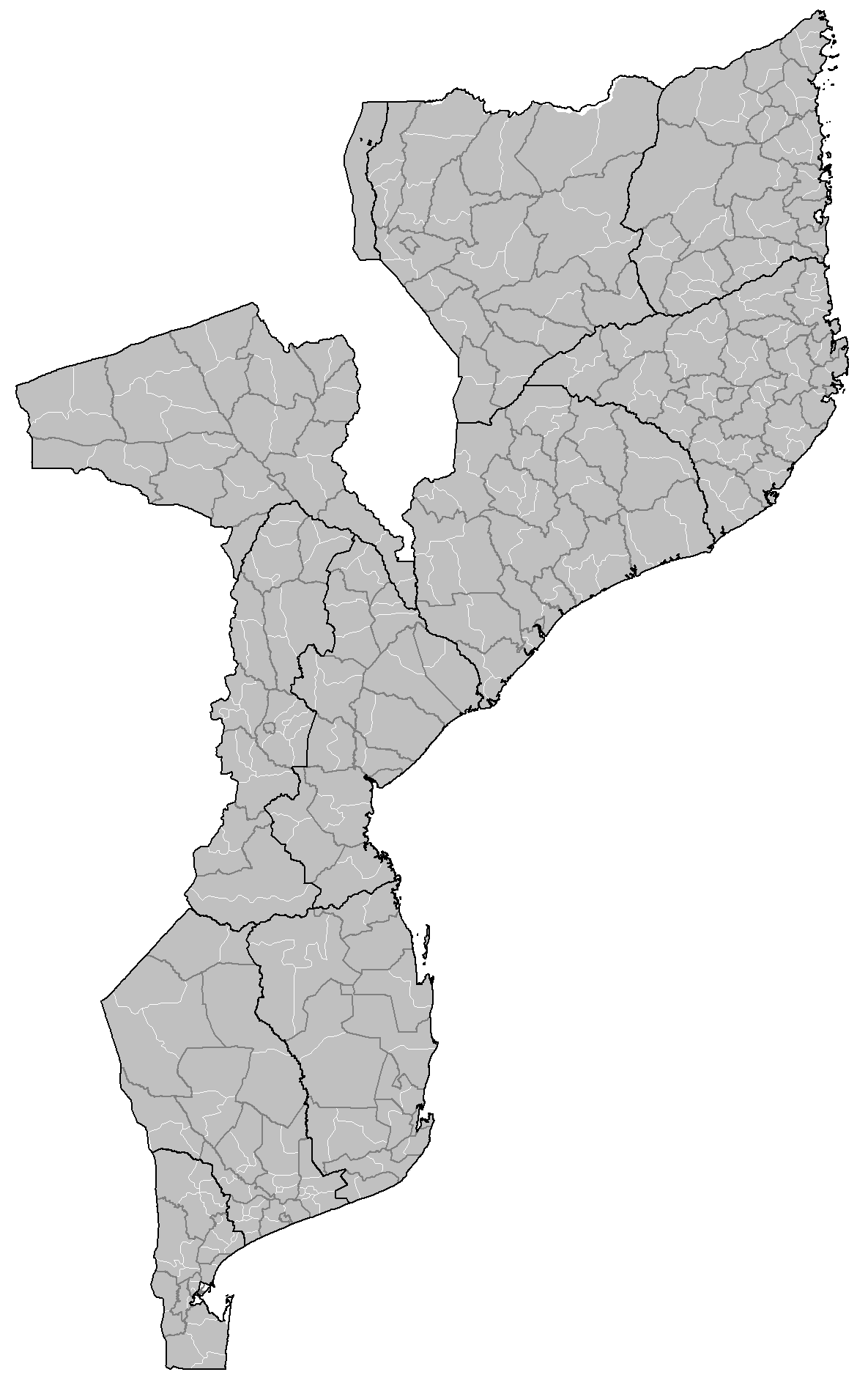
Postos of Mozambique

The districts of Mozambique are divided into 405 postos.

Postos administrativos (administrative posts) are the main subdivisions of districts. This name, in use during colonial times, was abolished after independence, and was replaced by localidades (localities). However, it was re-established in 1986.

Administrative posts are headed by a Secretário (secretary), which before independence were called Chefes de Posto (post chief).

Administrative posts can be further subdivided into localities, also headed by secretaries.

== See also ==
- List of postos of Mozambique
