= Cyclone Leon–Eline =

Australian and South-West Indian cyclone in 2000

Intense Tropical Cyclone Leon–Eline
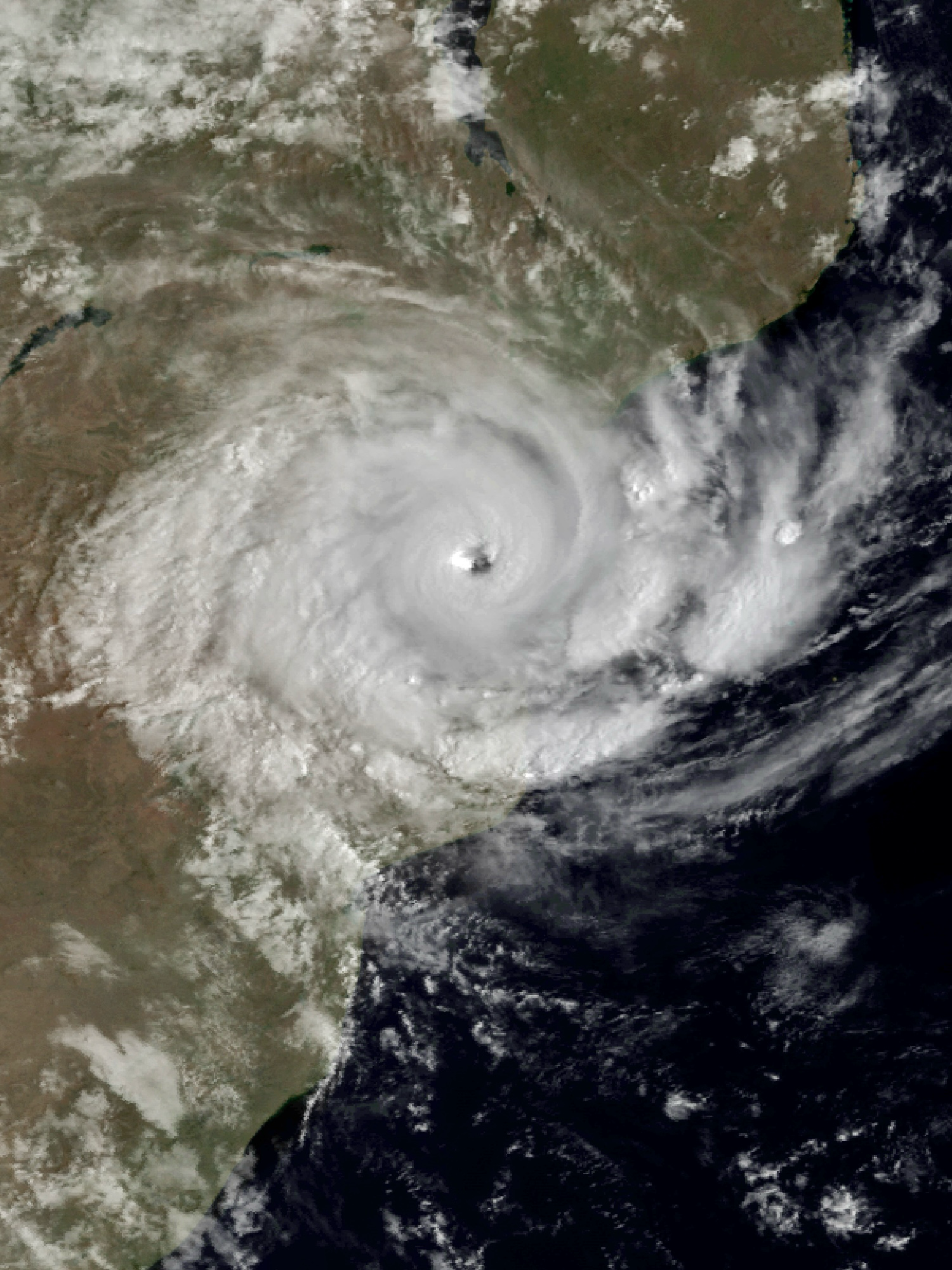
- Leon-Eline at peak intensity during landfall in Mozambique on 22 February

Meteorological history
- Formed: 1 February 2000
- Dissipated: 29 February 2000
- Duration: 4 weeks

Intense tropical cyclone
- 10-minute sustained (MFR)
- Highest winds: 185 km/h (115 mph)
- Highest gusts: 255 km/h (160 mph)
- Lowest pressure: 930 hPa (mbar); 27.46 inHg

Category 4-equivalent tropical cyclone
- 1-minute sustained (SSHWS/JTWC)
- Highest winds: 215 km/h (130 mph)

Overall effects
- Fatalities: 114–722 (Note: In Madagascar, Eline killed at least 64 people, although subsequent Tropical Storm Gloria affected the same region just two weeks later. The death toll for both storms is 205, with 66 confirmed fatalities related to Gloria, resulting in 139 deaths potentially related to Eline. There were only 17 confirmed fatalities in Mozambique, although the death toll from the cyclone and preceding floods was around 700, with 150 deaths before Eline's arrival. Therefore, there are up to 550 deaths related to the storm in that country. Elsewhere, Eline killed 12 people in Zimbabwe and 21 in South Africa.)
- Damage: >$309 million (2000 USD)
- Areas affected: Madagascar, Southern Africa (mainly Mozambique)
- IBTrACS
- Part of the 1999–2000 Australian region and South-West Indian Ocean cyclone seasons

Intense Tropical Cyclone Leon–Eline was the second longest-lived cyclone in the Indian Ocean, behind Cyclone Freddy, traveling over 11,000 km (6,800 mi) during its 29-day track through the Indian Ocean, throughout the month of February. The cyclone formed on 1 February 2000, in the Australian basin as Tropical Cyclone Leon, and was renamed Eline after crossing 90° E into the South-West Indian Ocean; there, the Météo-France office in Réunion (MFR) tracked the storm's movement and intensity. Late on 17 February, Eline made landfall near Mahanoro, Madagascar, with 10‑minute winds of 165 km/h (103 mph). The storm rapidly weakened over land, but restrengthened in the Mozambique Channel to reach peak 10‑minute winds of 185 km/h (115 mph), making it an intense tropical cyclone. On 22 February, Eline made landfall about 80 km (50 mi) south of Beira, Mozambique, near peak intensity. Eline quickly weakened over land as it moved across Southern Africa, finally dissipating over eastern Namibia on 29 February.

While moving across much of the Indian Ocean, Eline brought high waves, gusty winds, and rainfall to several islands. When Eline struck Madagascar, the country was in the midst of a cholera epidemic that killed over 1,000 people. Eline directly killed at least 64 people in the country. Tropical Storm Gloria struck Madagascar 13 days later, compounding the damage and making it difficult to discern the individual effects. Damage from Eline was estimated at $9 million (USD), (Note: All damage totals are in 2000 United States dollars) and collectively the two storms killed 205 people and left another 10,000 homeless. In the region around Vatomandry where Eline made landfall, 65% of houses were damaged, 90% of crops were lost, and 75% of health facilities were wrecked.

Before Eline's final landfall, Mozambique's worst floods since 1951 had killed about 150 people. The additional rainfall and flooding from Eline created the country's worst natural disaster in a century, and disrupted ongoing relief efforts. The combined effects destroyed over 250,000 ha (620,000 acres) of crop fields and killed 40,000 cattle. The Limpopo River reached 15 km (9.3 mi) wide and 11 m (36 ft) above normal in some areas, which isolated the town of Xai-Xai. A dam broke along the river, flooding the town of Chokwe in the middle of the night and trapping several unprepared residents; this accounted for nearly half of the death toll. About 55 people drowned in Sofala Province after rescue helicopters arrived too late to save them. Around 20,000 people in the capital city of Maputo lost their homes. In addition to the floods, strong winds blew away many roofs and some entire houses made of mud. The combined effects of the preceding floods and Eline left about 329,000 people displaced or homeless, killed around 700 people, and caused an estimated $500 million (USD) in damage. The flooding disrupted much of the economic progress Mozambique had made in the 1990s since the end of its civil war.

Elsewhere in Southern Africa, Eline brought strong winds and heavy rainfall when it crossed into eastern Zimbabwe. Rivers overflowed their banks in the country, damaging crops and houses while leaving 15,000 people homeless. The storm killed 12 people in the country. Flooding from the storm extended southward into Swaziland and South Africa. In the latter country, Eline dropped 503 mm (19.8 in) of rainfall in Levubu over three days, causing the Limpopo River to reach its highest level in 15 years. Officials opened dams along the river to prevent structural damage, which caused higher levels along the river to the east. At least 21 people died in the country, and about 80,000 people were left homeless. Damage in Limpopo Province alone was estimated at $300 million (USD). To the north, Eline dropped about 90 mm (3.5 in) of rainfall in southern Malawi, while gusty winds caused a power outage in Blantyre. Farther west, rainfall rates of 50–100 mm (2.0–3.9 in) were reported in Botswana.

== Meteorological history ==
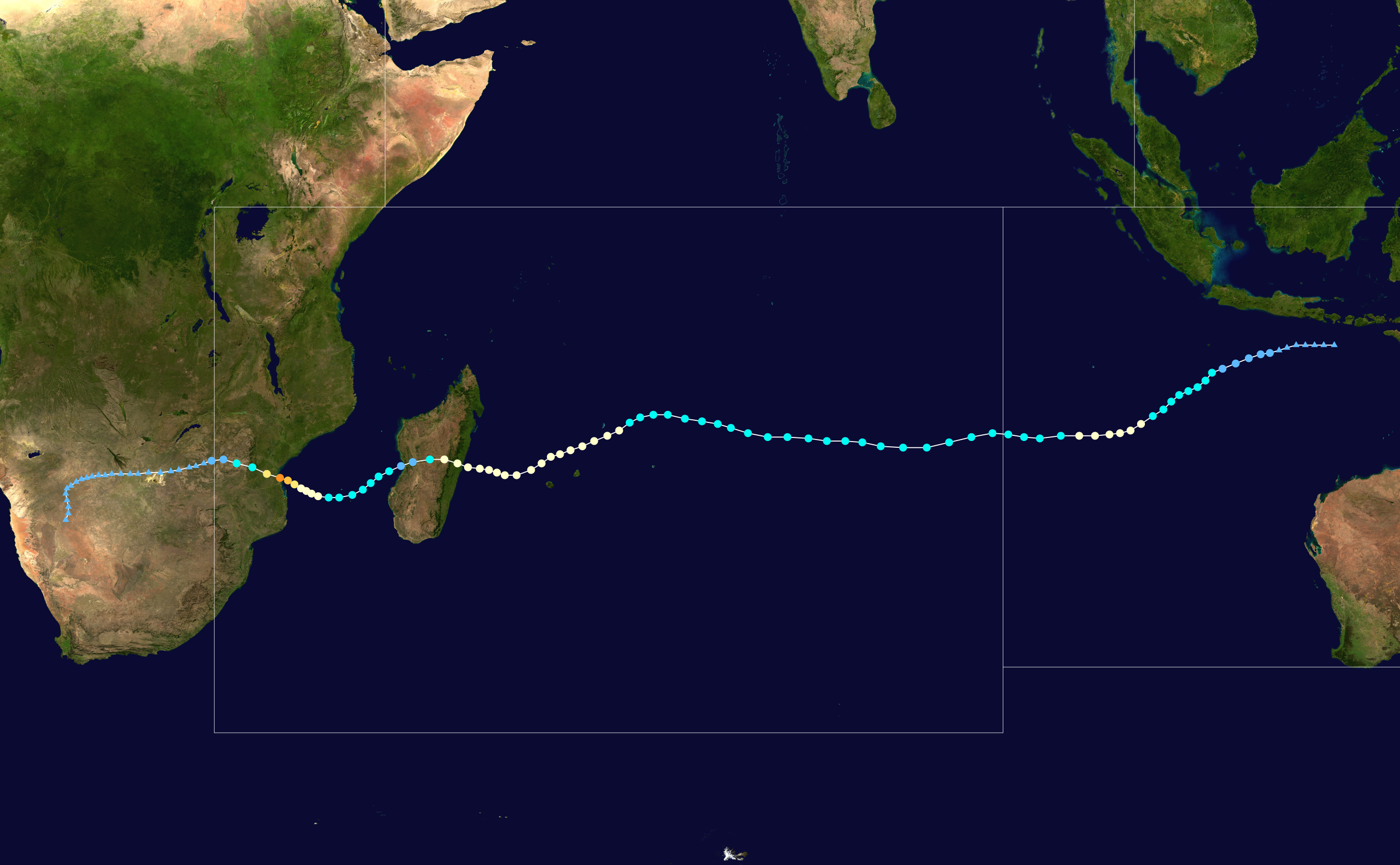
Map plotting the storm's track and intensity, according to the Saffir–Simpson scale Map key Saffir–Simpson scale Tropical depression (≤38 mph, ≤62 km/h) Tropical storm (39–73 mph, 63–118 km/h) Category 1 (74–95 mph, 119–153 km/h) Category 2 (96–110 mph, 154–177 km/h) Category 3 (111–129 mph, 178–208 km/h) Category 4 (130–156 mph, 209–251 km/h) Category 5 (≥157 mph, ≥252 km/h) Unknown Storm type Tropical cyclone Subtropical cyclone Extratropical cyclone, remnant low, tropical disturbance, or monsoon depression

The origins of Cyclone Leon–Eline were from a surge of energy within the monsoon trough that crossed the equator from the northwest, which spawned a low pressure area on 1 February in the eastern Indian Ocean, about 250 km (160 mi) south of the Indonesian island of Bali. Associated convection, or thunderstorms, was initially sparse due to wind shear in the region. Over the next few days, the low tracked west-southwestward without much development, moving around a large ridge over northwestern Australia. An anticyclone over the system provided outflow, allowing convection to increase despite the wind shear. At 22:00 UTC on 3 February, Australia's Bureau of Meteorology (BoM) (Note: The Tropical Cyclone Warning Center in Perth, Australia is a branch of the country's Bureau of Meteorology, which is the official Regional Specialized Meteorological Center for the Australian basin.) upgraded the tropical low to a Category 1 tropical cyclone on the Australian tropical cyclone scale, estimating 10‑minute sustained winds of 65 km/h (40 mph). At 04:00 UTC the next day, the BoM named the storm Tropical Cyclone Leon. On the same day at 03:00 UTC, the Joint Typhoon Warning Center (JTWC) (Note: The Joint Typhoon Warning Center is a joint United States Navy – United States Air Force task force that issues tropical cyclone warnings for the region.) began issuing advisories on the storm as Tropical Cyclone 11S. Around that time, Leon was located about 215 km (134 mi) south-southeast of Christmas Island, moving west-southwestward. With decreasing wind shear, the convection organized into rainbands, signaling that the storm was strengthening.

Early on 5 February, the BoM upgraded Leon to a Category 3 severe tropical cyclone on the Australian scale, estimating 10‑minute winds of 120 km/h (75 mph). At 22:00 UTC that day, the agency estimated an initial peak of 140 km/h (87 mph). On 6 February, the cyclone developed an eye in the center of the convection that was only visible on Special sensor microwave/imager, not on satellite imagery. On the same day, the JTWC upgraded Leon to the equivalent of a minimal hurricane, estimating 1‑minute winds of 140 km/h (87 mph). A trough passing to the south increased wind shear, causing the storm to weaken. Around that time, Leon passed about 510 km (320 mi) south of the Cocos Islands, while turning more to the west after the ridge strengthened to the south. By 8 February, the circulation was exposed from the rapidly dwindling thunderstorms. At 18:00 UTC that day, Leon crossed 90° E into the south-west Indian Ocean, and as result was renamed Eline by the Mauritius Meteorological Service. By that time, Météo-France (MFR) (Note: The Météo-France office in Réunion is the official Regional Specialized Meteorological Center for the basin.) estimated 10‑minute winds of 65 km/h (40 mph).

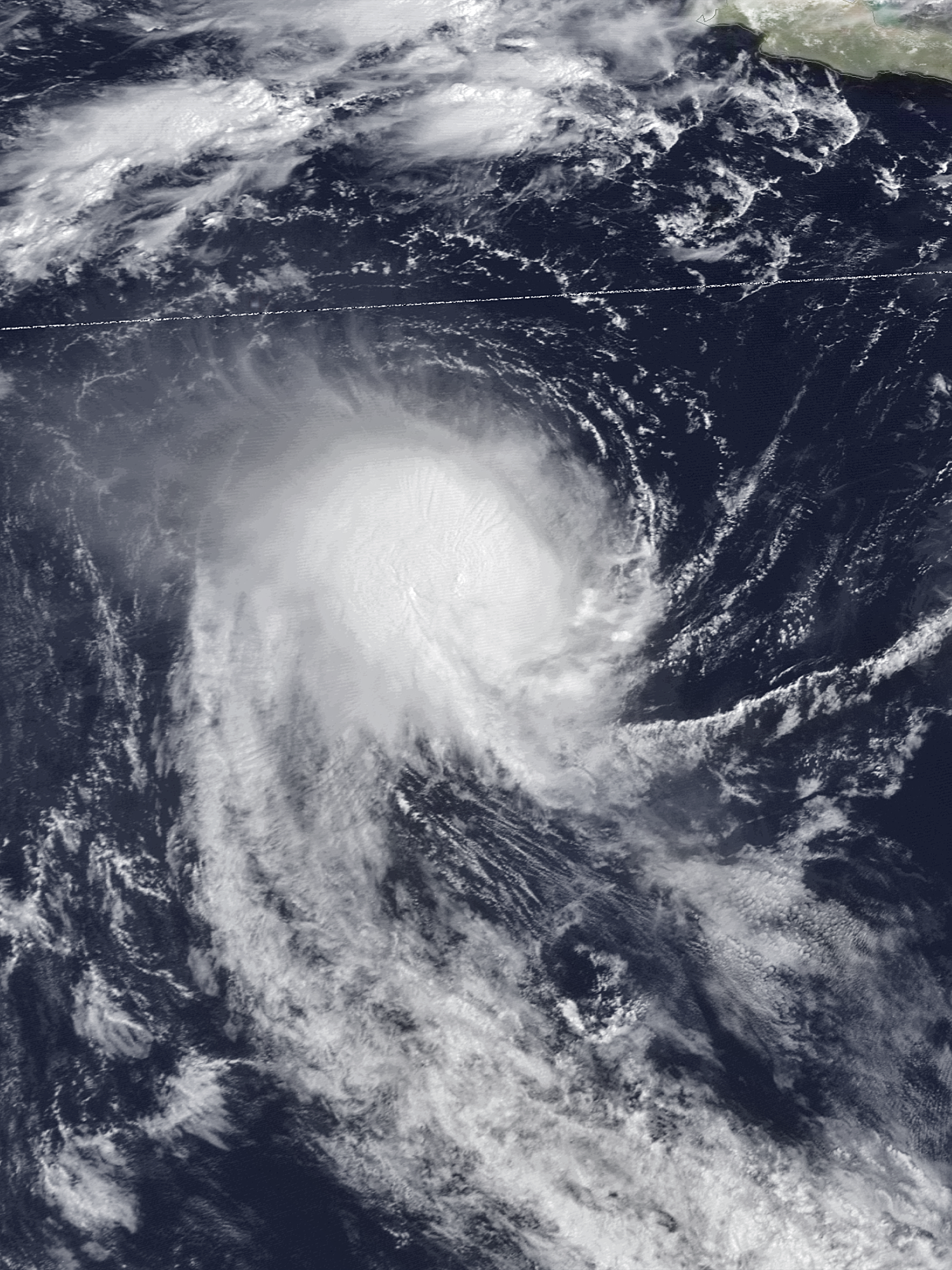
Satellite image of Leon in the Australian basin

Over the subsequent few days, wind shear caused the convection to wax and wane over Eline's center, limiting the thunderstorms to the southern periphery. The track shifted more to the west-northwest. On 11 February, Eline had weakened into a minimal tropical storm according to the MFR, about 1,110 km (690 mi) south of Diego Garcia, and the JTWC operationally downgraded it to a tropical depression. Later that day, however, a decrease in shear allowed thunderstorms to refire. On 13 February, a weakness in the ridge caused the storm to turn back to the west-southwest. Moving back beneath an anticyclone, conditions became more favorable for strengthening, allowing outflow and a central dense overcast to form, with the beginnings of an eye feature. Eline quickly intensified into a severe tropical storm later the same day. At 00:00 UTC the next day, the JTWC upgraded Eline to the equivalent of a minimal hurricane with 1‑minute winds of 120 km/h (75 mph). The MFR held off upgrading the storm, due to a passing trough increasing wind shear again. On 14 February, Eline passed about 85 km (53 mi) south of St. Brandon, and shortly thereafter resumed its strengthening after the shear dropped. Later that day, the storm bypassed Mauritius about 180 km (110 mi) to the northwest, with the storm's small structure sparing the island from the strongest winds. Early on 16 February, Eline attained tropical cyclone status, with 10‑minute winds of 120 km/h (75 mph), while passing about 160 km (99 mi) northwest of Réunion. This was nine days after it had weakened to tropical storm status the first time.

Upon becoming a tropical cyclone, Eline was still encountering wind shear and dry air. Despite these factors, the eye became better defined and the storm intensified as upper-level conditions improved. The cyclone turned more to the west toward Madagascar, despite a weakness in the ridge to the south. While approaching the country, Eline quickly intensified, reaching 10‑minute winds of 165 km/h (103 mph) by 18:00 UTC on 17 February. Around that time, the cyclone made landfall on eastern Madagascar near Mahanoro. Eline rapidly weakened over land while moving to the west-southwest, and the JTWC downgraded the storm to tropical depression status within 18 hours of moving ashore.

After crossing Madagascar for 26 hours, Eline emerged into the Mozambique Channel near Belo, still maintaining good outflow. With warm waters and a favorable upper-level environment, the depression quickly re-intensified as convection increased. At 12:00 UTC on 19 February, Eline re-attained moderate tropical storm status. While in the central Mozambique Channel, Eline passed about 35 km (22 mi) north of Europa Island, which recorded a barometric pressure of 992 mbar (29.3 inHg). Shortly thereafter, the storm turned more to the west-northwest due to a strengthening ridge to the south. A brief increase in wind shear delayed the strengthening trend, but Eline resumed intensifying on 21 February while slowly approaching southeastern Africa. Over a 24‑hour period, the pressure dropped by 45 mbar (1.3 inHg), indicative of rapid deepening. During that time, the convection organized into an intense eyewall around a well-defined 60 km (37 mi) eye. Eline had re-attained tropical cyclone status at 12:00 UTC of the same day, and 18 hours later reached intense tropical cyclone status. The MFR estimated peak 10‑minute winds of 185 km/h (115 mph); in contrast, the JTWC estimated peak 1‑minute winds of 215 km/h (134 mph), the equivalent of a Category 4 tropical cyclone on the Saffir–Simpson hurricane scale (SSHWS). While at peak intensity, Eline made landfall about 80 km (50 mi) south of Beira, Mozambique, where a central pressure of 989 mbar (29.2 inHg) was recorded. Gusts at landfall were estimated at 260 km/h (160 mph).

Although the winds rapidly decreased after landfall, the storm maintained a well-defined structure as it crossed from Mozambique into Zimbabwe late on 22 February. Weakening to tropical depression status, Eline crossed Zimbabwe and maintained its circulation, entering Botswana on 24 February. Three days later, the center drifted into eastern Namibia and turned to the south, finally dissipating on 29 February. After the circulation dissipated, the residual system merged with a heat low and an approaching cold front.

=== Records and statistics ===
Throughout its duration, Leon-Eline lasted 29 days, a record longevity for a storm in the southern Indian Ocean. The track was over 11,000 km (6,800 mi), or about 25% of the Earth's circumference. However, Eline was in the south-west Indian Ocean for 21 days, which is the third most on record. It was behind Cyclone Alibera in 1989 and Cyclone Georgette in 1968, the latter of which lasted 24 days in the basin, later surpassed by 2023's Cyclone Freddy, which lasted 36 days in the basin. The MFR noted that Eline was the strongest cyclone to strike the nation in several decades. The storm was uncommon in its landfall on mainland Africa; only 5% of storms in the basin do so, and most that cross or form in the Mozambique Channel turn to the south. Eline was unusual in maintaining its identity so far inland, aided by increased moisture and enhanced upper-level environmental conditions over southern Africa.

== Preparations and impact ==
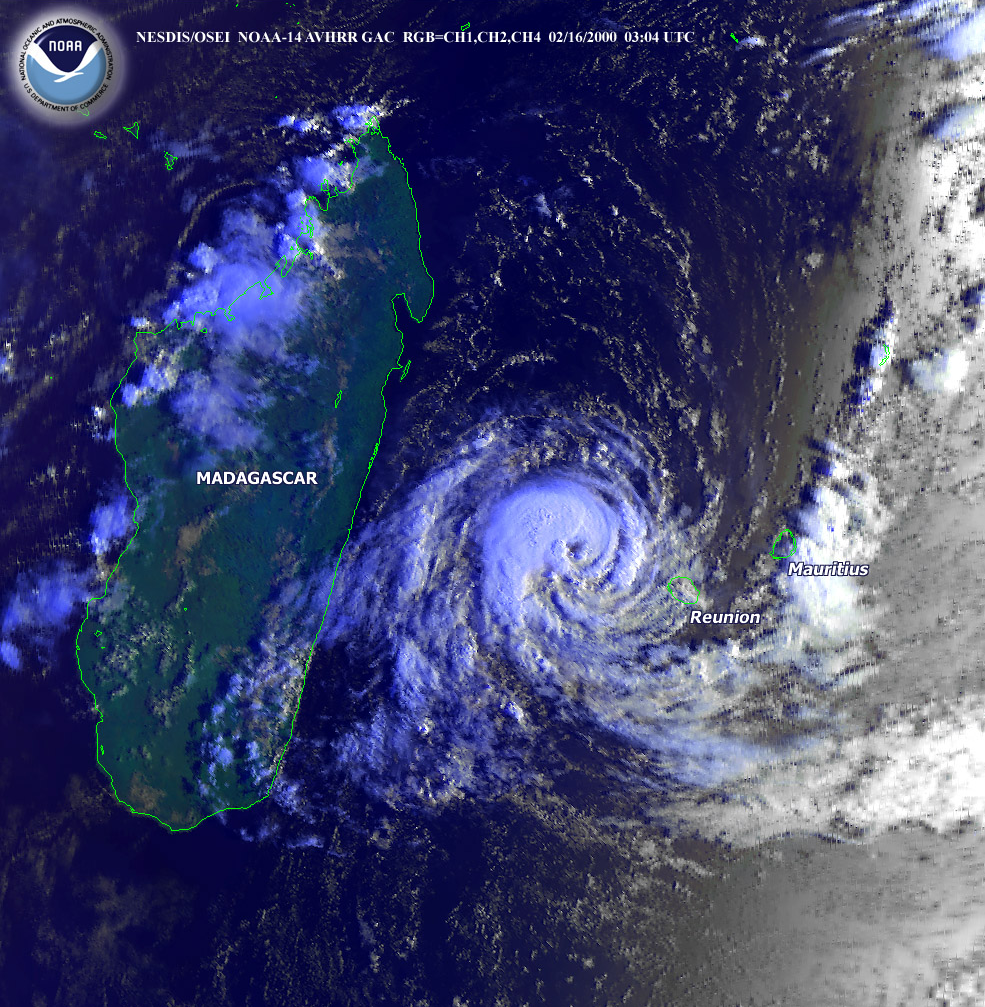
Cyclone Eline approaching Madagascar on February 16

Early in its duration while it was still in the Australian basin, the cyclone produced high waves near Christmas Island, forcing a boat of about 500 refugees to be escorted to port. Later, Eline brought wind gusts of 76 km/h (47 mph) to St. Brandon. On Mauritius, the cyclone produced wind gusts of 137 km/h (85 mph), along with heavy rainfall that peaked at 405 mm (15.9 in) at Sans Souci. This rainfall was about 70% of the average February precipitation total. After Eline began restrengthening and turned more to the southwest, officials on Réunion declared a red alert, but this was dropped when the cyclone passed the island. Ultimately, the storm brushed the island with gusts of 101 km/h (63 mph) along the coast, and 187 km/h (116 mph) in the mountainous peak of Maïdo. Rainfall was heaviest in the mountainous peaks, reaching 1,500 mm (59 in) at Bébourg. Significant wave heights remained below 3 m (9.8 ft).

=== Madagascar ===
Cyclone Eline struck while Madagascar was in the midst of a cholera epidemic that had killed over 1,000 people. When the storm moved ashore in eastern Madagascar, Eline produced strong winds along its path, with gusts estimated at 250 km/h (160 mph) by MFR at landfall. However, the storm blew away weather stations near the coast, which made the true landfall intensity unknown. Farther inland, Ivato International Airport near the capital Antananarivo reported winds of 100 km/h (62 mph), and winds in the capital were likely stronger. Eline also dropped heavy rainfall, with a 24‑hour total of 131 mm (5.2 in) at Ivato airport. The rains also caused flooding along Madagascar's west coast, which is usually spared from precipitation by mountains.

In Mahanoro, the biggest city near the cyclone's landfall in Madagascar, Eline disrupted power and water supplies while also leaving the town isolated. About 80% of buildings were damaged or destroyed there. In Marolambo, a village in eastern Madagascar, Eline killed six people. Heavy rainfall in the central portion of the nation caused landslides and flooding. Flooding also occurred in the west coast near Belo. The storm blocked portions of at least four highways. Nationwide, the storm left about 10,000 people homeless, with about 1,500 people forced to stay in storm shelters. Damage to public buildings was estimated at $300,000 (2000 USD). Nationwide, Eline killed at least 64 people and affected about a half-million people affected.

Only 13 days after Eline struck the country, Cyclone Gloria also hit northeastern Madagascar, bringing additional damage and flooding. The two storms collectively killed at least 140 people, although there was initial uncertainty in the toll due to disrupted communications. Floods from the two storm inundated 70% of homes and wrecked 70% of the crops in the districts of Andapa, Sambava, Antalaha, and Vohemar. About 12,000 people in 114 villages were isolated. Rice fields were flooded for over a week, and coffee and banana crops had severe losses. Collectively, 12,230 people were left without access to clean water.

=== Mozambique ===
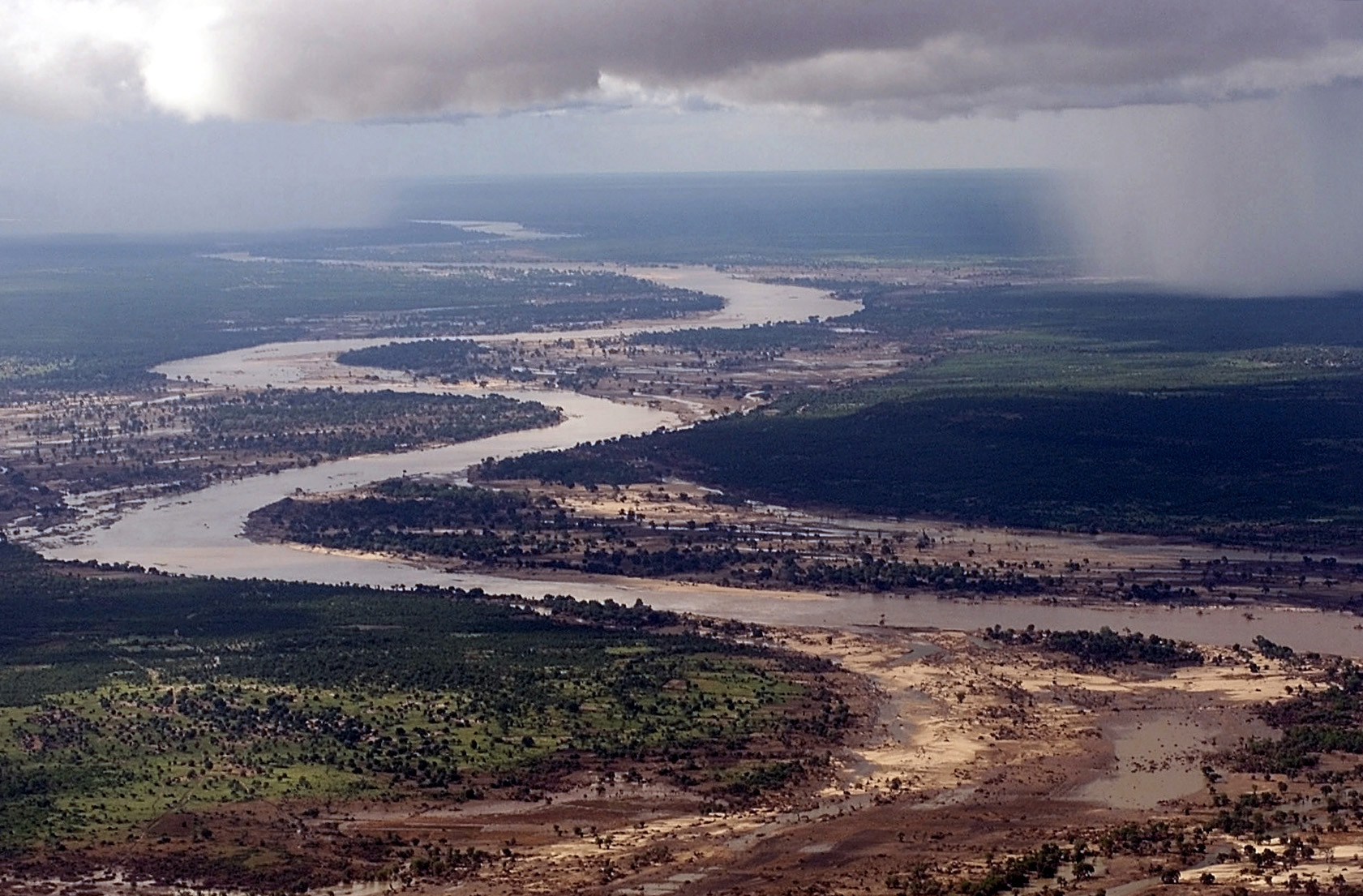
Flooded Limpopo River in Mozambique in March 2000

Before Eline struck Mozambique, storm warnings and later hurricane warnings were issued on 21 February. Flooding had affected the nation since January, with some areas receiving a year's worth of rainfall in two weeks. Widespread areas were inundated, with about 220,000 people displaced, and about 150 people killed. Eline moved ashore with very powerful winds, although there were no direct observations of the strongest winds. In Beira, the closest major city to the landfall point, winds reached storm force. However, the rainfall from Eline was the most impacting following the preexisting flooding, which were the worst since 1951. The floods were beginning to recede by the time Eline arrived, and by the end of February 2000, the situation was considered the country's worst natural disaster in a century. Flooding continued for days after Eline moved through southern Africa due to waters flowing downstream from neighboring countries. By early March the floods were beginning to recede again, leaving behind a deep layer of mud, ponds of contaminated water, and piles of rotten corpses.

While Eline moved ashore, high winds knocked over coconut trees, destroying over 250,000 ha (620,000 acres) of crop fields in conjunction with the floods. The floods killed 30% of the cows in Gaza Province, and about 40,000 cattle died nationwide, with many chickens and goats also killed. Many schools were closed after the storm, including 308 due to damage and others that housed storm victims. The storm knocked over telegraph power lines and caused widespread power and water outages from Inhambane to Beira, while also disrupting ongoing relief efforts. The cities of Chokwe, Chibuto, and Xai Xai all had damage to their water systems.

After the storm knocked over 90 power poles, about two-thirds of Beira was without power and water, and two people were killed due to downed power lines. Flooding damaged the World Food Programme warehouse in the city. Also in Beira, the combination of strong winds and waves sank five ships in the harbor, including one at the entrance; this halted port traffic for about two weeks. Floods submerged the primary highway connecting the north and south of the country, and damaged several other roads and rail lines, halting the region's economy by preventing movement of goods. About 4 km (2.5 mi) of the rail line between Maputo and Zimbabwe was under water. The swollen Limpopo River isolated the town of Xai-Xai after all connecting roads and the airport were inundated, and the bridge connecting the rest of the region to the south was damaged. Water levels along the river reached as high as 11 m (36 ft) above normal in some areas, as well as 15 km (9.3 mi) wide, which broke the record for highest crest by 3 m (9.8 ft). A dam broke along the river, flooding the town of Chokwe in the middle of the night and trapping several unprepared residents. Flooding there surpassed the previous water depth record by 2 m (6.6 ft), set in 1977, thus inundating the town up to ceiling of one story buildings. In the city of Inhambane, the flooded Save River swept away several houses. Along the river, 50,000 people were unaccounted for as of March 1, many of whom were washed away. In nearby Nova Mambone, thousands of people became homeless due to storm flooding, killing at least ten people. About 55 people drowned in Sofala Province after rescue helicopters arrived too late to save them. Around 20,000 people in the capital city of Maputo lost their homes.

In addition to the floods, strong winds blew away many roofs and some entire houses made of mud, leaving thousands of people homeless. The combined effects of the preceding floods and Eline left about 463,000 people displaced or homeless, including 46,000 children five years old or younger. Overall, the preceding floods and Eline caused about 700 deaths, half of whom in Chokwe. with damage estimated at $500 million (2000 USD). At least 17 people died directly due to Eline, although many bodies were washed away and unable to be counted. The cyclone and the floods disrupted much of the economic progress Mozambique had made in the 1990s since the end of its civil war.

=== Elsewhere in mainland Africa ===
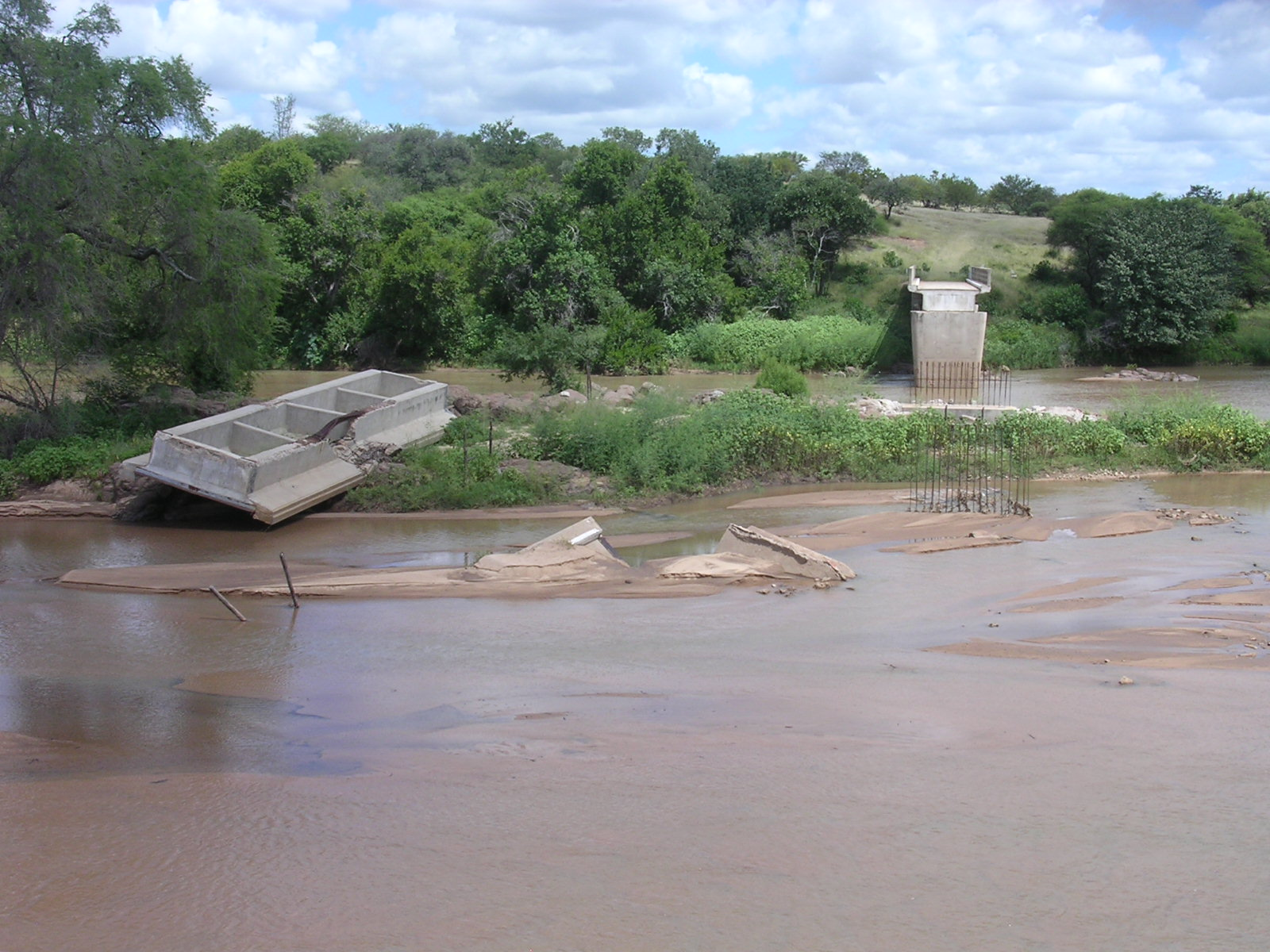
Mankonkoni Bridge on the Thuli River, Zimbabwe, destroyed by Cyclone Eline

Costliest South-West Indian Ocean tropical cyclones
Rank	Tropical cyclones	Season	Damage
1	4 Chido	2024–25	$3.9 billion
2	4 Idai	2018–19	$3.3 billion
3	3 Gezani	2025–26	$2 billion
4	5 Freddy	2022–23	$1.53 billion
5	3 Garance	2024–25	$1.05 billion
6	3 Fytia	2025–26	$475 million
7	4 Enawo	2016–17	$400 million
8	4 Kenneth	2018–19	$345 million
9	4 Leon–Eline	1999–00	$309 million
10	4 Dina	2001–02	$287 million

The MFR issued a gale warning for Zimbabwe in anticipation of strong winds well inland. However, the Zimbabwe government did not issue any storm warnings until the storm moved over the country. Due to Eline maintaining a well-defined structure, it brought strong winds and heavy rainfall when it crossed into eastern Zimbabwe. The heavy rains caused rivers to overflow their banks. Officials opened flood gates along several dams to maintain their integrity, which increased flooding downstream, including in Mozambique. However, eight dams that were used for irrigation purposes were destroyed. The storm destroyed over 3,800 homes in the eastern portion of the country while killing 17,000 heads of livestock. Flooding also washed away roads, bridges, and some power lines. Mutare, the country's third largest city, lost power during Eline's passage. Overall the storm killed 12 people in the country.

Flooding from the storm extended southward into Swaziland and South Africa. In the latter country, Eline dropped 503 mm (19.8 in) of rainfall in Levubu over three days, causing the Limpopo River to reach its highest level in 15 years. In Limpopo Province, a station recorded 284 mm (11.2 in) of rainfall in just 24 hours. Officials opened dams along the Limpopo River to prevent structural damage, which caused higher levels along the river to the east. However, 16 dams failed in the country, causing further damage to irrigation systems. The floodwaters isolated the town of Louis Trichardt after N1 road was covered, and most border crossings were closed. The floods covered roads and caused several houses to collapse, hospitalizing 12 people in Thohoyandou. Eline also damaged crops in the country, namely pulses, maize, and other vegetables. At least 21 people died in the country, and about 80,000 people were left homeless, forcing many people into churches and schools. Damage in Limpopo Province alone was estimated at $300 million (USD), with crop damage estimated at $11 million. Flooding began receding by the end of February.

To the north, Eline dropped about 90 mm (3.5 in) of rainfall in southern Malawi. The storm's gusty winds wrecked houses and knocked over trees, causing power outages in Blantyre. Farther west, rainfall rates of 50–100 mm (2.0–3.9 in) were also reported in Botswana. In Namibia, Eline's rainfall contributed to the third wettest summer in 50 years, as well as the wettest since 1976. Several locations in the southern portion of the country reported daily rainfall rates of 60 mm (2.4 in).

== Aftermath ==
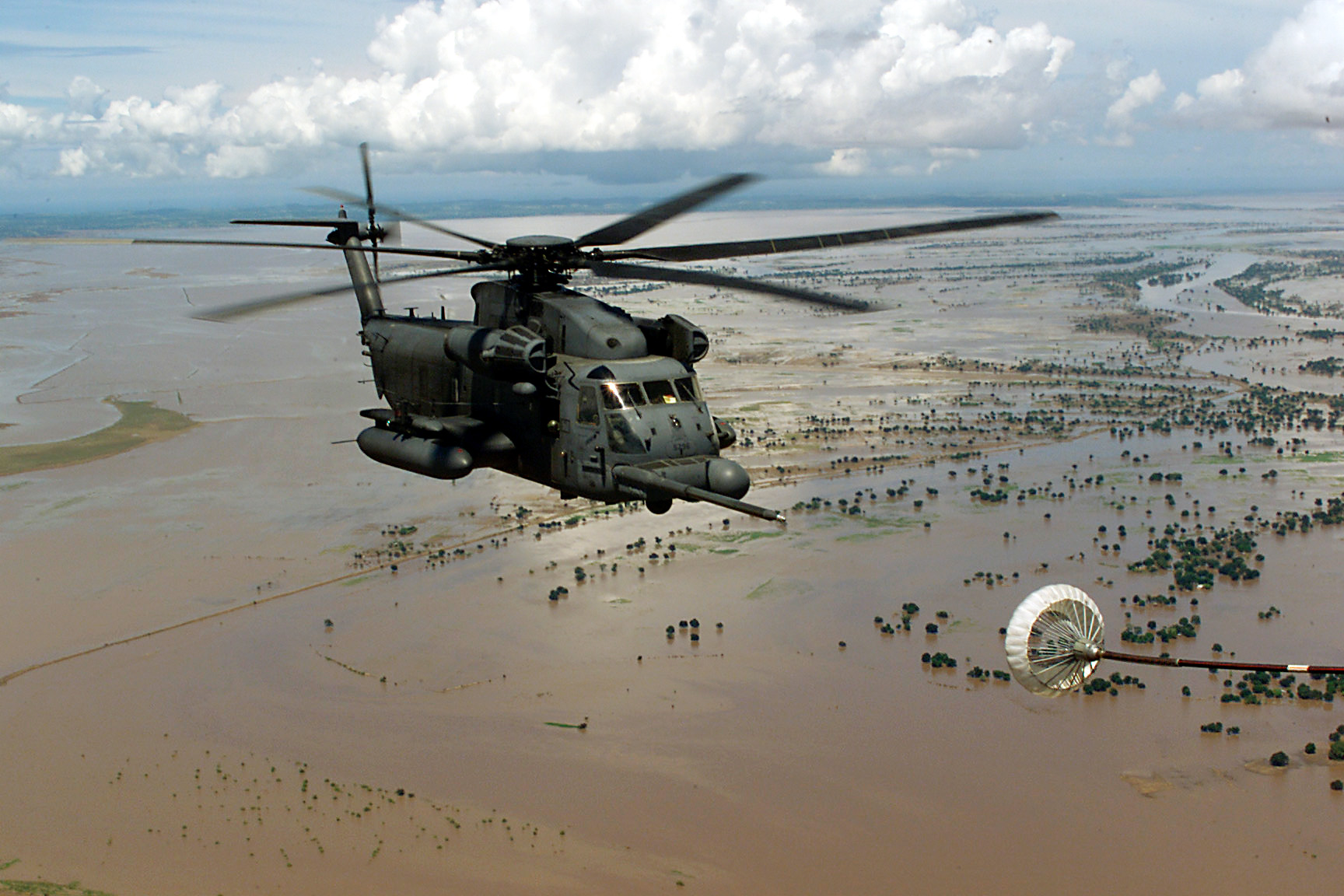
Image of United States helicopter flying over flooded Mozambique

Immediately after Eline struck Madagascar, the government began distributing relief items, such as rice, tents, and sheets. On 21 February, survey flights helped indicate the extent of damage across the nation. Supplies were distributed by road from Antananarivo to the worst affected areas, with helicopters dropping off aid to isolated communities. After receiving request from the Malagasy government, UNICEF flew 15 tons of supplies from Copenhagen, such as medicine, 10.5 tons of food, and equipment to help coordinate relief work. The agency also transported thousands of blankets and water purification tablets from Antananarivo. However, UNICEF faced difficulties in distributing the supplies. The government of France sent two helicopters with teams of doctors to Madagascar, and Médecins Sans Frontières sent about 35 tons of supplies, such as medicine, water purifying devices, and food. The World Food Programme flew about 400 tons of food to affected residents across the country, including 25 tons to Mahanoro. Due to the combined impacts of Eline and Gloria, the government of Madagascar requested for international assistance on March 7, which was coordinated through the United Nations Office for the Coordination of Humanitarian Affairs. In response, the government of the United Kingdom donated £1.3 million (US$1.9 million) to Madagascar. The Organisation of African Unity donated $200,000 to Madagascar on March 10. In addition to Cyclone Gloria striking the country in March, Cyclone Hudah hit eastern Madagascar in early April, causing additional deaths and damage.

The government of Zimbabwe declared a state of emergency in three provinces. Nearby Botswana donated 15 million litres of fuel to the country to help with their recovery. Although Botswana was affected by the floods, their government was able to provide food and relief to the storm victims. In South Africa, families were forced to keep corpses in their houses due to the ongoing flooding. The country's government authorized R7.1 million (ZAR, US$1.1 million) to pay for emergency assistance. Limpopo Province was declared a disaster area. The South African government issued a warning on March 1, stating that flood refugees from Mozambique would be deported if they entered illegally. The country of Australia donated $250,000 to assist relief work in both Zimbabwe and South Africa.

=== Mozambique ===
"You know, it may sound ungrateful, but I think (the aid) came too late. We could have saved some more lives if we had this kind of support from the beginning."

— Graça Machel, Mozambique's former first lady via CNN

By the time Eline struck Mozambique, there was already incoming assistance from the international community, responding to the earlier flooding. Mozambique's president at the time, Joaquim Chissano, requested for additional aid after the storm struck, asking for $65 million for both reconstruction and emergency aid, and later increasing the request to $160 million. By the end of February 2000, various countries had pledged $13.5 million to Mozambique, well short of the required needs, but that rose to nearly $119 million by March 17. By March 4, 39.6 tons of various relief goods reached the country, to be distributed from the towns of Bilene and Magul. The supplies nearly overwhelmed the small airport at Maputo, as lack of distribution caused food to decay in the sun.

The Mozambique government worked to evacuate residents in newly flooded areas using boats, and set up 121 camps for evacuees. By early March, there were 35,000 people at camps in Chiaquelane, and another 10,000 in Macia. However, the country had a limited capacity for widespread rescues due to insufficient helicopters. In some locations, the floodwaters were so strong that boats were unable to operate search and rescue missions. Residents left homeless by the storm were forced to stay in churches and schools, although some residents in the country's capital, Maputo, provided a spare bedroom. Citizens in the city also provided clothing to those who lost their homes in the flood. About 2,000 residents from the flooded town of Chokwe walked 40 km (25 mi) to receive shelter in Macie. Following the storm, the residual floodwaters contributed to outbreaks of malaria and cholera, with malaria infections at four times the usual rate killing at least 11 people. Areas in southern Mozambique also lost access to clean water, furthering dehydration and illnesses. In addition, the United Nations Mine Action Service expressed concern that the floods shifted the locations of landmines left over from the nation's civil war. Later, the remnants of Cyclone Gloria halted relief work due to heavy rainfall.

Soon after the storm struck, CARE operated airlifts of food to flooded areas. The World Food Programme approved $2 million to help airlifting 53,000 metric tons of food. A fleet of 29 helicopters had rescued 14,204 people by March 7 as well as operating airlifting missions. This included 12 planes and helicopters from South Africa, six helicopters with crews along with 100 motorboats from the United Kingdom, ten helicopters from Germany, and two from Malawi. Many residents in flooded areas initially had to hold onto trees and roofs due to lack of helicopters, with 100,000 people needing rescue as of March 1. After the floodwaters receded, the need for rescue diminished, allowing families to return home, although helicopters were still required to airlift relief goods. Emergency road repairs allowed supplies to be delivered by road in some areas by March 5. The United States sent a crew of 700 soldiers in what became Task Force Atlas Response, a $37 million operation to coordinate disaster relief, rebuild roads, deliver crop seed, and drop off aid. This was ordered by U.S. President Bill Clinton on March 2 after criticism that the international assistance was insufficient. The Save the Children organization helped reunited separated children from their families, while World Relief flew seeds and tools to help 26,260 farmers regrow their damaged crops. The United Kingdom assisted by canceling the country's $150 million debt earlier than scheduled, and urged other nations to follow suit; Italy canceled its $500 million debt in March. On 24 February, the World Bank provided $2.5 million to rebuild roads, and later provided an additional $15 million. The same agency delayed debt payments for one year. Portugal and Spain canceled $150 million and $20 million worth of debt, respectively. Through the Jubilee 2000, most wealthy nations postponed debt payments for one year on March 16.

== See also ==
- Tropical cyclones in 2000
- Other tropical cyclones of the same name

Other tropical cyclones similar to Leon–Eline:

- Cyclone Geralda (1994) – A strong tropical cyclone that severely impacted Madagascar six years before Leon–Eline
- Hurricane John (1994) – The second longest-lasting tropical cyclone worldwide
- Cyclones Katrina and Victor–Cindy (1998) – A long-lived tropical cyclone in the South Pacific that eventually regenerated into another long-lasting cyclone in the Indian Ocean
- Cyclone Hudah (2000) – Another long-lived cyclone that also affected Madagascar and Mozambique, from the same season as Leon–Eline
- Cyclone Gafilo (2004) – the most intense tropical cyclone recorded in the South-West Indian Ocean which also devastated the same countries affected by Leon–Eline
- Cyclone Idai (2019) – Caused catastrophic damage in southern Africa and became the deadliest tropical cyclone recorded in the region
- Cyclone Kenneth (2019) – Another Category 4 tropical cyclone that made landfall in northern Mozambique
- Cyclone Freddy (2023) – The longest-lasting tropical cyclone on record; affected similar areas and caused catastrophic damage and hundreds of deaths
