= Macia =

- Location within Mozambique
- Coordinates: 25°02′S 33°06′E
- Country: Mozambique
- Provinces: Gaza Province
- District: Bilene Macia District

Population (2008)
  - Total: 25,153

Macia is a small town in Gaza Province, Mozambique, and the seat of the Bilene Macia district. In 2008, its population was 25,153.

== Location ==
It caters for the areas of Mazivila, Dzimbeni, Macuane, Machimba, Ghombane, Zukula, Nwampaku, Incaia, and Machenganyane.

== History ==
During the Mozambican Civil War, people around these villages used to live in town, as it was safer, compared to other villages. However, since Renamo forces targeted the towns most, it apparently appeared to the villagers that towns were not the ideal places to hide. As such, they started going back to the bush for the night, going back to town in the morning.

The town is starting to develop after being badly destroyed during the Civil War, which lasted more than a decade.

== Commerce ==
The town has a market where people from the small villages come to buy and sell their products.

Macia owes much of its economic vibrancy to its location on the intersection of the main highway of Mozambique (EN1) with the road to Chokwe, Massingir, located by the Massingir Dam, and Chicualacuala, and with the road to the coastal resort of Praia do Bilene (Bilene Beach).

The town has now been elevated in status to a municipality. Its surrounding villages are still in absolute poverty.
