= Bilene Macia District =

Coordinates: 25°02′S 33°06′E

Bilene Macia
- District
- Bilene Macia District on the map of Mozambique
- Country: Mozambique
- Province: Gaza
- Capital: Macia

Area
  - Total: 2,157 km^{2} (833 sq mi)

Population (2007 census)
  - Total: 151,911
  - Density: 70.43/km^{2} (182.4/sq mi)

Bilene Macia District is a district of Gaza Province in south-western Mozambique. Its principal town is Macia. The district is located at the south of the province, and borders with Chókwè District in the north, Xai-Xai District in the east, and Magude District of Maputo Province in the west. In the south, the district is bounded by the Indian Ocean. The area of the district is 2,157 square kilometres (833 mi^{2}). It has a population of 151911 as of 2007.

== Geography ==
The rivers in the district belong to the drainage basins of the Komati River and the Munhuane River, a major left tributary of the Komati. There are three permanent lakes in the district Lake Chuali, Lake Pave, and Lake Sacative.

The climate is tropical semi-arid in the interior and tropical humid at the coast. The annual rainfall at the coast is around 1,500 millimetres (59 in), and in the interior it varies between 500 millimetres (20 in) and 800 millimetres (31 in).

== Demographics ==
As of 2005, 43% of the population of the district was younger than 15 years. 58% of the population spoke Portuguese. The most common mothertongue among the population was Tsonga. 60% were analphabetic, mostly women.

== Administrative divisions ==
The district is divided into six postos, Chissano (five localities), Macuane (three localities), Mazivila (three localities), Messano (two localities), Praia do Bilene (one locality), and Vila da Macia (one locality).

== Economy ==
3% of the households in the district have access to electricity. The district has a tourist potential, due to relative proximity to Maputo. Out of 165 existing lodges, 102 are in operation.

=== Agriculture ===
In the district, there are 30,000 farms with, on average 1.5 hectares (0.0058 mi^{2}) of land. The main agricultural products are corn, cassava, cowpea, peanut, and sweet potato.

=== Transportation ===
There is a road network in the district which includes a 60 kilometres (37 mi) stretch of the national road EN1, as well as 25 kilometres (16 mi) of national road between Macia and Chibaquelene and 33 kilometres (21 mi) of national road between Macia and Bilene.
