= Shingwedzi River =

Shingwedzi River Shingwedzirivier, Rio Singuédzi
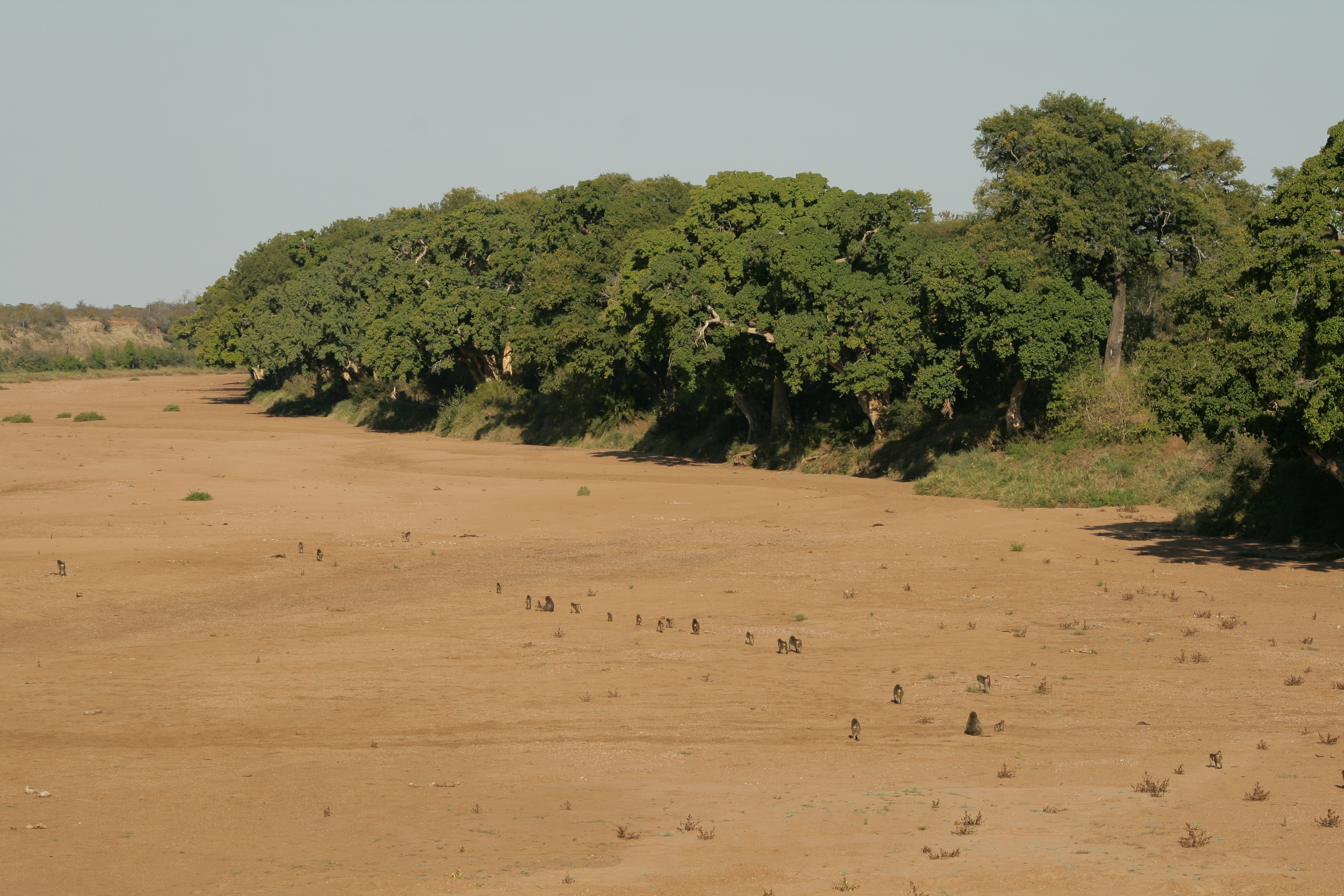
- The dry bed of the Shingwedzi River in the Kruger National Park

- Location of the Shingwedzi River mouth
- Etymology: Different meanings in the Venda language, among them "place of hard rock" and "dryness of area"
- Native name: Xingwedzi (Tsonga); shingwedzi (Tsonga); Tshingwedzi (Venda)

Location
- Country: South Africa and Mozambique
- Provinces: Limpopo and Gaza

Physical characteristics
- Source: ESE of Thohoyandou
  - location: near Mtititi, Limpopo Province, South Africa
  - elevation: 480 m (1,570 ft)
- Mouth: Olifants River (Limpopo)
  - location: Gaza Province, Mozambique
  - coordinates: 23°53′32″S 32°17′8″E
  - elevation: 86 m (282 ft)
- Basin size: 5,301 km^{2} (2,047 sq mi)

The Shingwedzi River (Venda: Tshingwedzi; Tsonga: Xingwedzi/shingwedzi; Afrikaans: Shingwedzirivier; Portuguese: Rio Singuédzi) is a river in Limpopo Province, South Africa, and Gaza Province, Mozambique. It is a left hand tributary of the Olifants River (Rio dos Elefantes) and the northernmost river of its catchment area, joining it at the lower end of its basin. The Shingwedzi is a seasonal river whose riverbed is dry for prolonged periods.

== Course ==
The Shingwedzi River drains the plain southeast of the Soutpansberg. Its sources are about 40 km to the ESE of Thohoyandou and about 20 km west of the town of Malamulele, in the Mulamula area. It flows eastwards across the lowveld and enters the area of the Kruger National Park.

The main rivers of the Shingwedzi basin are the Mandzoro River, Mphongolo River, Phugwane River, Gole River, Shisha River, Tshamidzi River, Bububu River and the Dzombo River.

Two dams on the river are located within the Kruger National Park near the Shingwedzi rest camp; the Kanniedood Dam and the Sirheni Dam. The Makuleke Dam is in the Mphongolo River. After crossing into Mozambique, the river bends and flows southeastwards. Further downstream the Shingwedzi flows close to the northeastern side of the Massingir Dam's reservoir and joins the Olifants about 12 km down river from the dam wall.

This river is a good place for observing large herds of African bush elephants, herds of 50 to 60 individuals being common in its basin.

== See also ==
- Great Limpopo Transfrontier Park
- Kruger National Park
- List of rivers of South Africa
