= Makuleke Dam =

- Interactive map of Makuleke Dam
- Official name: Makuleke Dam
- Location: Limpopo, South Africa
- Coordinates: 22°52′3″S 30°54′8″E
- Opening date: 1990
- Operators: Department of Water Affairs and Forestry

Dam and spillways
- Type of dam: earth-fill
- Impounds: Mphongolo River
- Height: 19.7 metres (65 ft)
- Length: 990 metres (3,250 ft)

Reservoir
- Creates: Makuleke Dam Reservoir
- Total capacity: 13,000,000 cubic metres (460,000,000 cu ft)
- Catchment area: 180 km^{2}
- Surface area: 75 hectares (190 acres)

Makuleke Dam is an earth-fill type dam located on the Mphongolo River, a tributary of the Shingwedzi River. It is located near Malamulele, at Makuleke village, Limpopo, South Africa. The dam was established in 1990 and serves mainly for irrigation purposes. The hazard potential of the dam has been ranked significant (2).

== See also ==
- List of reservoirs and dams in South Africa
- List of rivers of South Africa
