= Cyclone Hudah =

South-West Indian and Australian cyclone in 2000

Very Intense Tropical Cyclone Hudah
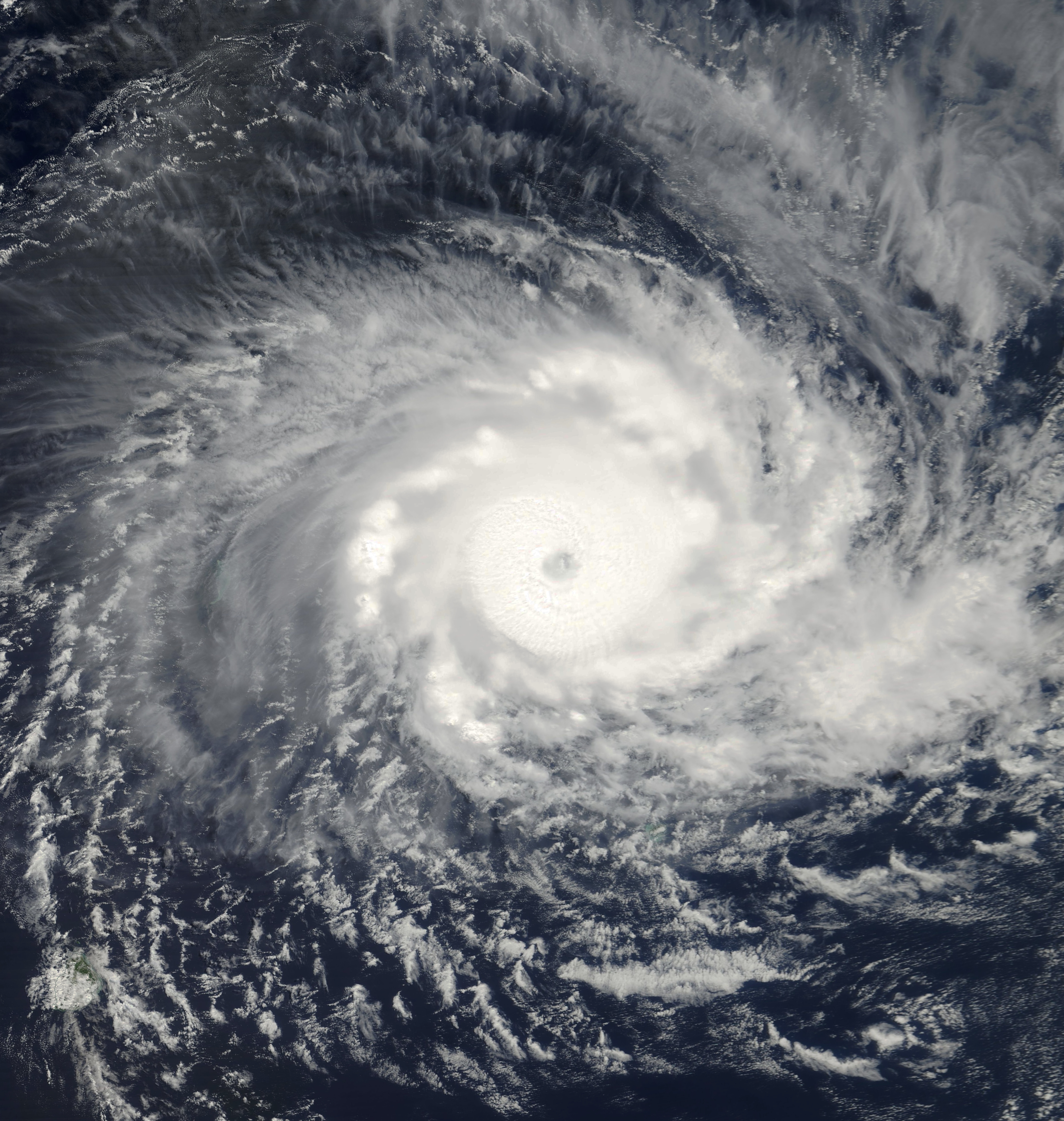
- Cyclone Hudah on 31 March

Meteorological history
- Formed: 22 March 2000
- Dissipated: 9 April 2000

Very intense tropical cyclone
- 10-minute sustained (MFR)
- Highest winds: 220 km/h (140 mph)
- Highest gusts: 280 km/h (175 mph)
- Lowest pressure: 905 hPa (mbar); 26.72 inHg

Category 4-equivalent tropical cyclone
- 1-minute sustained (SSHWS/JTWC)
- Highest winds: 230 km/h (145 mph)
- Lowest pressure: 905 hPa (mbar); 26.72 inHg

Overall effects
- Fatalities: 114 total
- Areas affected: Madagascar, Mozambique
- IBTrACS
- Part of the 1999–2000 Australian region and South-West Indian Ocean cyclone seasons

Very Intense Tropical Cyclone Hudah was a powerful and destructive tropical cyclone that affected Southeast Africa in April 2000. It was the last in a series of three cyclones that impacted Madagascar during the year. Hudah first developed as a disturbance embedded within the monsoon trough on 22 March, within the Australian region cyclone basin. Moving westward as the result of a strong subtropical ridge to its south, the storm quickly intensified, and reached Category 2 cyclone intensity on 25 March before entering the Southwest Indian cyclone basin. For various reasons that remain unknown, the cyclone was only designated a name by the time it had crossed into the area of responsibility of the Regional Specialized Meteorological Center in Réunion. Nonetheless, Météo-France (MFR) assigned the name Hudah to the cyclone. An eye formed, and the storm intensified into a tropical cyclone on 27 March well to the southeast of Diego Garcia. On 1 April, the MFR upgraded it to a very intense tropical cyclone, estimating peak 10-minute winds of 225 km/h (140 mph). By contrast, the Joint Typhoon Warning Center (JTWC) estimated 1-minute winds of 235 km/h (146 mph). At this time, the MFR estimated the pressure to have been 905 hPa (mbar), making Hudah the most intense tropical cyclone worldwide in 2000. Cyclone Hudah maintained peak winds until making landfall just southeast of Antalaha, Madagascar on 2 April. It weakened greatly over land, but re-attained tropical cyclone status on 5 April after moving over the Mozambique Channel. Hudah reached 10-minute winds of 160 km/h (99 mph) by the time it made landfall on Mozambique near Pebane, Mozambique, on 8 April, and dissipated by the next day.

While in the vicinity, Hudah brought moderate winds to Rodrigues, St. Brandon, and Tromelin Island. The cyclone affected the same parts of Madagascar that were previously impacted by cyclones Eline and Gloria. Waves reached at least 8 m (26 ft) in height along the coast. The storm was considered the worst to affect the Antalaha region in 20 years, where 90% of homes were destroyed. It was estimated that the storm left at least 100,000 people homeless in Madagascar, and there were 111 deaths. In Mozambique, damage was much less than expected, and the storm affected areas farther north in the country than where Eline struck. Heavy rainfall occurred along the coast, but was insufficient to cause river flooding. Strong winds damaged roofs and downed trees, mostly around Pebane, and the storm killed three people.

== Meteorological history ==
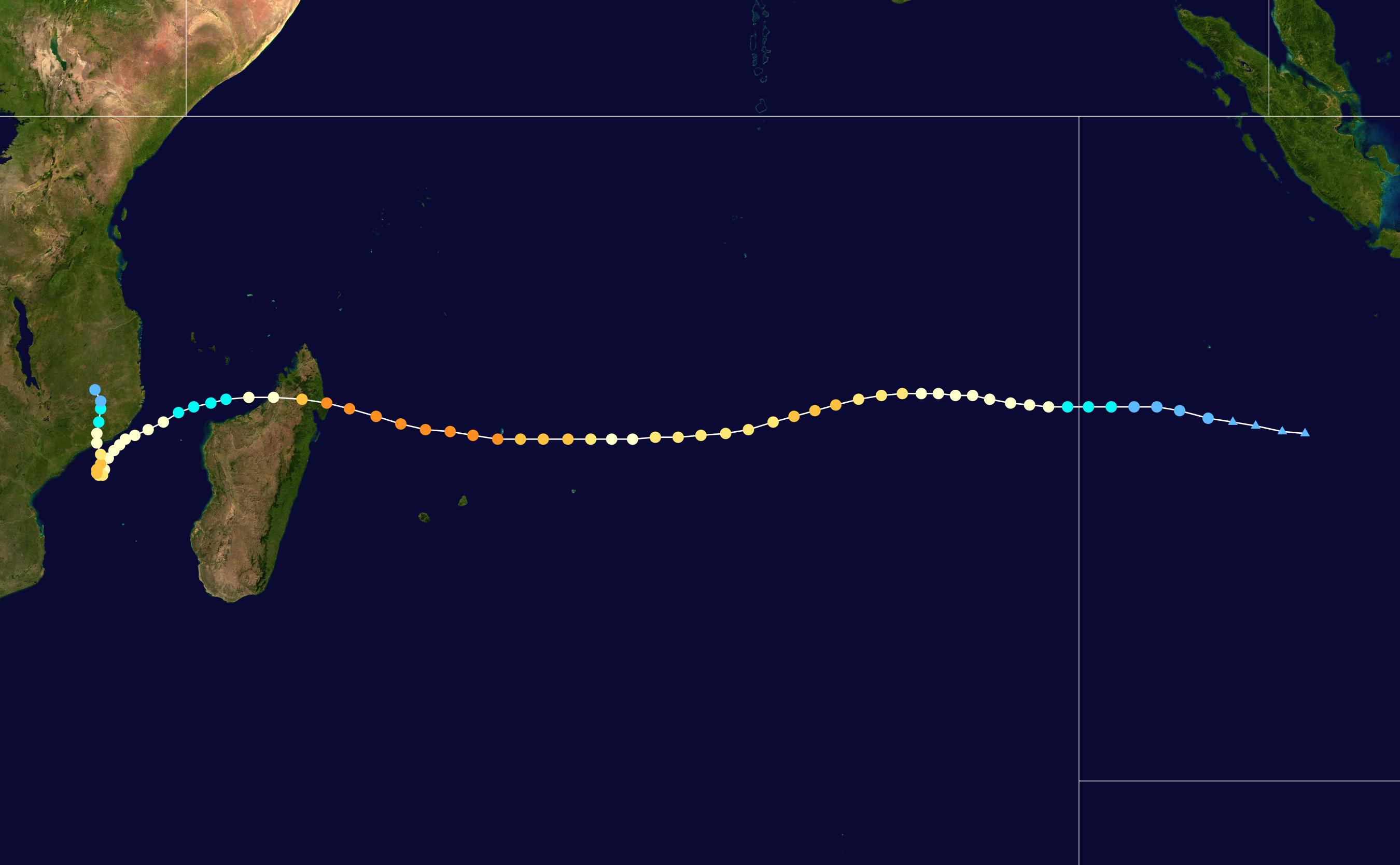
Map plotting the storm's track and intensity, according to the Saffir–Simpson scale Map key Saffir–Simpson scale Tropical depression (≤38 mph, ≤62 km/h) Tropical storm (39–73 mph, 63–118 km/h) Category 1 (74–95 mph, 119–153 km/h) Category 2 (96–110 mph, 154–177 km/h) Category 3 (111–129 mph, 178–208 km/h) Category 4 (130–156 mph, 209–251 km/h) Category 5 (≥157 mph, ≥252 km/h) Unknown Storm type Tropical cyclone Subtropical cyclone Extratropical cyclone, remnant low, tropical disturbance, or monsoon depression

At 18:00 UTC on 22 March, the Joint Typhoon Warning Center (JTWC) began monitoring an area of disturbed weather in the central Indian Ocean, approximately 685 km (426 mi) southeast of Christmas Island. The system was embedded mostly in the monsoon trough, surrounded by favorable environmental conditions, which prompted the JTWC to issue a Tropical Cyclone Formation Alert at 00:30 UTC on 24 March. Convection increased as vertical wind shear decreased, and the system developed a curved band pattern. Throughout the day, the storm showed signs of potential rapid intensification, due to its quick organization. The Bureau of Meteorology's Perth Tropical Cyclone Warning Center (Perth TCWC) noted the system as a tropical low at 10:00 UTC on 24 March, and the JTWC issued its first warning two hours later. However, for reasons which remain unclear, the Bureau of Meteorology did not extensively monitor the system.

Initially, the storm moved westward under the influence of a strong subtropical ridge to the south. Despite having reached tropical cyclone intensity according to Perth TCWC, it was not assigned a name. Once the storm crossed 90°E on 25 March, the Météo-France's La Réunion Regional Specialized Meteorological Center (MFR) began tracking the system as a moderate tropical storm, giving it the name Hudah. Gradually intensifying, Hudah developed an eye with an eyewall primarily in the northern semicircle, indicated by a Tropical Rainfall Measuring Mission (TRMM) pass over the system. On 26 March, Hudah ceased strengthening as cloud tops warmed and the eye became no longer evident. Atmospheric divergence remained favorable, and Hudah eventually restrengthened, attaining tropical cyclone intensity at 00:00 UTC on 27 March, while located approximately 1,200 km (750 mi) southeast of Diego Garcia. This period of strengthening was short-lived, likely due to dry air. The cloud structure fluctuated as well, with a poorly defined eye appearing at times on satellite imagery. Hudah was able to attain an initial peak intensity of 155 km/h (96 mph) at 06:00 UTC on 29 March according to the MFR, shortly after passing 1,010 km (630 mi) south of Diego Garcia. An anticyclone that had been over Hudah showed signs of weakening later that day, spurring an increase in wind shear and causing weakening. This period of weakening was short-lived, and Hudah resumed its former strengthening trend by the night of 30 March as shear decreased and convective organization and areal extent increased. After passing 275 km (171 mi) north of Rodrigues Island, Hudah attained intense tropical cyclone status by 12:00 UTC on 31 March. Satellite imagery indicated a large, cloud-free eye, indicative of a strong tropical cyclone.

On 1 April, Hudah continued intensifying while approaching eastern Madagascar, and by 06:00 UTC that day, the MFR upgraded the storm to very intense tropical cyclone intensity – the highest rating on the agency's cyclone classification scale. Shortly after, at 12:00 UTC, the storm was analyzed to have reached its peak intensity with maximum sustained winds of 225 km/h (140 mph) and a minimum barometric pressure of 905 mbar (905 hPa; 26.7 inHg), ranking Hudah among some of the strongest tropical cyclones ever recorded in the Southwest Indian Ocean. The JTWC listed a similar intensity for the storm, with winds of 235 km/h (146 mph), though these winds were for 1-minute sustained winds instead of 10-minute sustained winds. This intensity was later analyzed to have been very near the theoretical maximum for tropical cyclones in the environmental conditions Hudah was in. At the time, TRMM imagery indicated that the storm featured two concentric eyewalls. Cyclone Hudah maintained peak intensity up until it made its first landfall approximately 28 km (17 mi) southeast of Antalaha, Madagascar at 17:30 UTC on 2 April. Hudah substantially weakened as it traversed the mountainous terrain of northern Madagascar, and was downgraded to tropical depression status by the time it entered the Mozambique Channel at 12:00 UTC on 3 April.

Despite losing much of its convection over land, Hudah maintained a well-organized cloud structure once in the Mozambique Channel on 3 April. As a result of moving back over warm waters, the system began to re-intensify, and attained moderate tropical storm intensity at 00:00 UTC on 4 April. Meanwhile, a large central dense overcast developed, and Hudah began to track west-southwestward as opposed to its previous westward trajectory. Despite computer forecast models suggesting that Hudah would continue westward, the storm instead turn to a southward drift, giving it time to strengthen in the Mozambique Channel. This was the result of a mid-latitude trough weakening the nearby subtropical ridge. By 18:00 UTC on 5 April, Hudah was upgraded back to tropical cyclone intensity. A banding eye began to appear on satellite imagery, though it remained generally unstable, and a large banding feature formed over the western half of Hudah. The nearby trough later weakened in intensity, causing the tropical cyclone to move north-northwestward towards the Mozambique coast on 7 April. It was at this time that Hudah reached a tertiary peak intensity with winds of 160 km/h (99 mph). The tropical cyclone accelerated northwards throughout the day, eventually making its final landfall near Pebane, Mozambique at 06:00 UTC on 8 April as a slightly weaker storm. Once inland, Hudah rapidly weakened, and was no longer tracked by the MFR by 00:00 UTC on 9 April. The JTWC issued its final warning on the system six hours later, as the remnants of Hudah moved through northeastern Mozambique, producing spotty convection.

== Preparations, impact, and aftermath ==
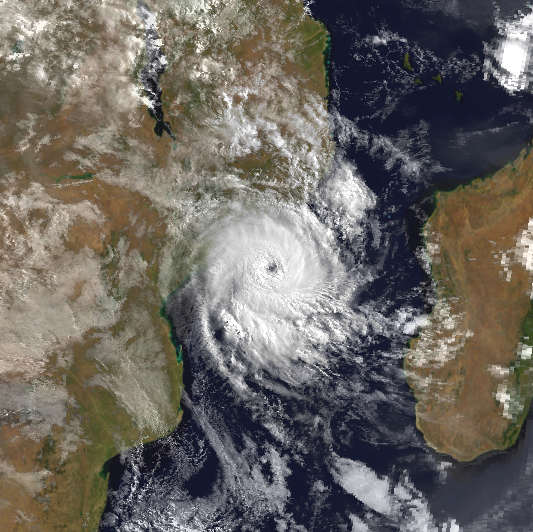
Cyclone Hudah reintensifying in the Mozambique Channel on 7 April

=== Rodrigues Island, Saint Brandon, and Tromelin Island ===
Passing north of Rodrigues Island on 30 March, Hudah produced moderate winds, though effects to infrastructure and crops on the island were minimal. During the night of the following day, Hudah passed near the Saint Brandon archipelago. A weather station on the island maintained by the Mauritius Meteorological Services reported a minimum pressure of roughly 996 mbar (996 hPa; 29.4 inHg) and a maximum sustained wind measurement of 70 km/h (43 mph). During the night of 1 April, the cyclone passed approximately 35 km (22 mi) south of Tromelin Island, producing strong winds. A Météo-France station on the isle recorded sustained winds of 125 km/h (78 mph) and a gust of 180 km/h (110 mph). A minimum pressure of 972 mbar (972 hPa; 28.7 inHg) was also recorded. Due to a lack of sustainable infrastructure on the latter two islands, damage was minimal.

=== Madagascar ===
As the cyclone moved closer to Madagascar on 2 April, Radio Madagascar called for residents of Toamasina to take precautionary measures. At the time, forecasts predicted that Hudah would make landfall in northern Madagascar later that day.

Upon making landfall, Hudah impacted the same regions that were affected earlier in the year by Cyclone Leon–Eline and Severe Tropical Storm Gloria. The cyclone produced waves at least 8 m (26 ft) in height, which impacted the coast. Across affected areas, coffee plantations, fruit trees, and rice crops in low-lying areas were damaged. Food warehouses in the northeastern areas of Madagascar were destroyed. In the small town of Antalaha, up to 90 percent of all homes were destroyed, and two people were killed. The city's water and electrical systems were cut off. Only eight homes remained intact along a stretch of road leading from the town to the local airstrip. As a result, only concrete structures remained standing, while those made of iron sheeting or wood materials were destroyed. Thus, the road was covered in debris, slightly delaying airlift operations to the region in the storm's aftermath. Nearby vanilla fields were also severely damaged.

Due to the effects of Hudah, the cyclone was considered the worst to strike the Antalaha region in 20 years. The towns of Maroantsetra and Andapa were also hit hard, with 60 to 70 percent of homes in the latter town destroyed. Maroantsetra, a coastal town, was flooded by the storm surge, and as a result seven people died. The commune of Mananara Nord was completely flooded by the storm. Other isolated villages could not be reached via road or telecommunications due to the storm. One of these cities was Sambava, which suffered from a lack of available telephone links since late on 2 April. One person died in Sambava. A resort in the town of Cap Est was flattened. Initial estimates indicated that Hudah caused at least 100,000 people to become homeless.

=== Mozambique ===
While Hudah was located in the Mozambique Channel, the cyclone was expected to cause flood conditions in the Mozambican provinces of Nampula, Cabo Delgado, and potentially Zambezia. Even prior to Hudah, Mozambique was already facing a widespread flood and resultant humanitarian crisis; conditions which were further exacerbated by three tropical cyclones which impacted the country within the previous four months. The Instituto Nacional de Gestão de Calamidades (INGC) warned residents in potentially affected areas to take precautionary measures and secure fishing boats. The South African National Defense Force (SANDF) maintained 50 soldiers and other military personnel and a number of aircraft to monitor the ongoing floods in Mozambique and potential impacts from Hudah. An Australian contingency held operations for a hospital and water purification plant in Chibuto to assist potentially affected populations. Multiple other relief organizations began to supply Mozambique with relief supplies due to the threat of the impending storm. The UN World Food Programme (WFP) sent 1,000 tonnes (1,100 short tons) of food to Nampula Province and 500 tonnes (550 short tons) of food to Quelimane Province. The WFP also placed relief aircraft on standby. The Mozambican Ministry of Health sent 30 tents and 10 rolls of plastic to Cabo Delgado, Nampula, and Zambezia provinces. The United States Agency for International Development (USAID) dispatched a group of 12-member search and rescue team to Maputo in order to train local relief crews.

Just 46 days after Cyclone Eline's devastating landfall in Mozambique, Hudah brought further flooding to the nation, although farther north than Eline. Before the storm moved ashore, Hudah dropped 80 mm (3.1 in) of rainfall over 24 hours in Quelimane along the coast. Despite the heavy rainfall from Hudah, there was not a repeat of the deadly river flooding that followed Eline. The Licungo River rose due to the rains, but the water levels did not rise above the banks. Some roads near Pebane were flooded, although not deep enough to disrupt travel. The storm's strong winds knocked over many trees in its path, mostly in a 10 km (6.2 mi) radius around Pebane, blocking the main road into the city. The winds also damaged about 10% of the roofs in Pebane, as well as four schools; about 160 boarding school children had to be sheltered elsewhere due to damage. A damaged wall fell and injured four people. Outside of the city, the winds damaged the manioc crop, and about 60 ha (150 acres) of crop fields were destroyed. The cyclone destroyed around 100 huts in Pebane and nearby Moma, leaving 300 people homeless. There were three deaths in Mozambique related to Hudah; strong winds knocked a coconut off a tree, killing a child. Overall damage was less than anticipated.

== Aftermath ==
After the storm, the United Nations Disaster Management Team (UNDMT) assisted the Conseil National de Secours (CNS) in Madagascar with surveying areas affected by Hudah. The UNDMT also appealed for relief materials for at least 50,000–100,000 people. Two light helicopters in Mahajanga and Sambava were dispatched to support two planes in providing assistance to affected populations. Médecins Sans Frontières (MSF) also provided food and medical aid. The United Nations Office for the Coordination of Humanitarian Affairs (OCHA) served as a channel for donations to relief efforts, and also made available US$50,000 from the United Kingdom's Department for International Development (DFID) for immediate relief purposes. Although the Red Cross had appealed for relief materials for Madagascar before Hudah had hit, these materials would arrive in April, assisting residents affected by Hudah and serving as a backbone for a long-term rehabilitation plan. Due to inclement weather, surveys by humanitarian organizations on the island were not conducted until 4 April, a full two days after Hudah first struck the island. A Malagasy aircraft delivered 6 tonnes (6.6 metric tons) of rice along with packages of other various supplies to affected regions. The CNS planned to deliver 10 tonnes (11 short tons) of rice to Antalaha. Although initial reports indicated that 24 people were killed due to Hudah, later reports raised the death toll in Madagascar to 111.

In Mozambique, the country's National Institute of Disaster Management distributed 10 tons of food products and plastic housing tents to Pebane, where damage was worst. Officials determined that the storm damage could be repaired by local governments.

== See also ==
- Tropical cyclones in 2000
- List of South-West Indian Ocean very intense tropical cyclones
- Cyclone Leon–Eline (2000) – A Category 4 tropical cyclone which severely impacted Madagascar and Mozambique.
- Cyclone Gafilo (2004) – A deadly cyclone that struck northeastern Madagascar.
- Cyclone Indlala (2007) – Another late season cyclone that struck northeastern Madagascar.
- Cyclone Freddy (2023) – A Category 5 tropical cyclone that took a similar path to Hudah and also severely impacted Madagascar and Mozambique.
