= Stewart Sukuma =

Stewart Sukuma, born Luis Pereira in 1963, is a Mozambican singer. Sukuma's stage name means "rise up" in Xitsonga and "push" in Swahili. He was born in Cuamba, Niassa Province. Coming from a modest family, Sukuma loved music; he moved to the Mozambican capital of Maputo in 1977, learning to play percussion instruments, guitar and piano. Five years later, Sukuma joined a musical group as a vocalist. He received a Ngoma Mozambique award in 1983, and has been described as "Mozambique's most popular male vocalist". Sukuma's songs include "Felizminha", "Xitchuketa Marrabenta", "Sumanga", "Male" and "Why". He sings in Portuguese, English, Swahili, Echwabo and Xitsonga.

== Early life and career ==
Born is a small town, Sukuma was a son of a truck driver with a modest income. He received his first guitar as a Christmas gift at a party for poor people. After Mozambique became independent in 1975, Sukuma danced for musical groups. The death of his eldest sister, who had left two children and a house in Maputo, drove him to the city in 1977. Sukuma learned to play percussion instruments, guitar and keyboards, and began singing in a band in 1982.

When he moved to Maputo, he went to live temporarily in his sister's house, who was married to one of the most highly regarded musicians in the city: Edmundo Luis Gomes better known for Mundinho. Here, the first contact with a battery was made through his brother-in-law. Percussion instruments emerged in Sukuma's life out of necessity and passion.

With some guitar basics, he began to imitate famous international songs of the time that were consumed by the market. He was persistent and with a little luck he ended up meeting other great Mozambican musicians such as Hortencio Langa, Arao Litsuri, Lisboa Matavele, Fani Pfumo, Alexandre Langa with whom he lived and learned to perfect his singing and guitar.

Before recording his first song he played in bars and nightclubs for many years. It was in these places where he had time to perfect his singing. In 1982 an opportunity arises to participate in a musical contest organized by a figure well-known for his connection with Eduardo Mondlane, former president of FRELIMO: Eddy Mondlane was the son. Stewart Sukuma won the award for best performance in this contest and records his first song backing by his band at that time, Formacao 82: Musica Quente created some excitement at the time because it was out of the market context, it was sung in Portuguese at a time when traditional languages commanded the music market and the quality was above average and it was a reggae, the first to be recorded in Mozambique .

This song earned him recognition as an emerging composer. From here on, it starts recording more often. He started to write in Portuguese but created a balance with tradition. That was the hardest part to get. With all the influences of western music Sukuma had a hard task to investigate the popular and traditional rhythms of Mozambique. The only source that existed in the 1980s was the Companhia Nacional de Canto e Danca, under the coordination of David Abilio, and the ARPAC, an institution that preserves traditional rhythms. He joined Companhia de Danca and toured extensively as a sound technician and supporting musician. It was here where Sukuma learned most of the traditional music of Mozambique.

He recorded a song for state-owned Radio Moçambique the following year, and received a Ngoma Mozambique award. After working with the Orchestra Marrabenta Star, Sukuma moved to South Africa and released Afrikiti in 1997.

The base acquired from the information he gathered in his research allowed him to start recording more frequently on Radio Mocambique, the only studio active in the 1980s in Maputo.

But he still needed more contact with experienced musicians and luck hit him once again and he was invited by the great Ghanaian saxophonist, George Lee Larnioh to join the Banda Anansi which was based in Swaziland.

After two years living in Swaziland and playing with Anansi, basically in hotels, he returned to Maputo on vacation and received an invitation from the great concert manager Aurelio Le Bon to join the famous Marrabenta Star Orchestra of Mozambique as a percussionist and singer. At the Marrabenta Orchestra, he toured the world and established his first contacts with the western music market and shared stages with great African musicians such as Papa Wemba, Baaba Maal, Youssou N'dour and gradually began to understand the tricks of the music market in world. While the other musicians, his colleagues, focused on their career linked to the Orchestra, Sukuma had more time to investigate the market, the ways of composing and fusing traditional music with pop music. On these tours, he bought the first CDs of the African musicians he most admired and among them Salif Keita, where he gained enormous influences in the way of composing and arranging the songs. After his experience with the Marrabenta Orchestra and influenced by the arrangements of other great African musicians, he travels to South Africa in search of more sophisticated studios and meets an old friend who had a studio: Fernando Perdigao, sound engineer and producer and musical arranger from great prestige living in Johannesburg.

Together, they decide to record the first and one of the most important CDs of the new generation of musicians from Mozambique in the 90s: Afrikiti! Fernando Perdigao and his partner at the time, Cedric Samson, at Treehouse music studio in Johannesburg, will be the producers of this first CD and invited great figures in South African and Mozambican music scene to play songs previously written by Sukuma. Bass players Fana Zulu and Peter Sclair, pianist Paul Hanmer, guitarist Jimmy Dludlu and percussionist John Hassan team up with Stewart Sukuma to materialize Afrikiti. Then later, Mauritz Lotz, Kanyo Maphumule, Kululiwe Sithole and others. Hugh Masekela and George Lee are keen to record this album after listening through the producers.

After the recording Stewart Sukuma has two proposals on the table, one by Sony Music SA led by Lindelani Mkhize and the other by EMI SA led by Sean Watson.Sony Music asked to wait six months until Lindelani, newly admitted, became familiar with the market. Stewart didn't want to wait with such anxiety and signed with EMI/CCP Records. Afrikiti was launched in Maputo, at Hotel Polana, in an unprecedented ceremony in Mozambique with the presence of the Minister of the Environment, Dr. Ferraz, the President of the Republic, Joaquim Chissano and Pascoal Mocumbi, Prime Minister.

Afrikiti becomes the first Mozambican CD to be released in national territory in 1997.

A year later Stewart Sukuma signs with Tropical music Germany and the CD is available in all major music stores around the world distributed by the hands of BMG-Ariola.

Sukuma moved to Boston in 1998, where he attended the Berklee College of Music. A decade later, he was on the advisory board of the school's Africa Scholars program.

In 2013, Sukuma featured in fellow Mozambican musician Azagaia's second and final album, Cubaliwa, appearing on the track "Wa Gaia".

== Music and activities ==
Sukuma combines traditional and contemporary Mozambican music and instrumentation. His songs reflect Mozambique's varied musical influences, which include Portugal throughout the country and Islam in the north (which was visited by Arabs). Sukuma began a project in 2010 to encourage young people to play and listen to Marrabenta, a popular style of Mozambican dance music. He donated part of the proceeds of his first solo album, Afrikiti (1997), to environmental groups, and is involved with AIDS relief. Sukuma was appointed the first national goodwill ambassador for UNICEF Mozambique on 14 December 2012. The following year, he visited evacuees on behalf of UNICEF in Chiaquelane, Chókwè District who were in temporary accommodations after the flooding of the Limpopo River.

== Discography ==
=== Albums ===
- Afrikiti (1997)
- Nkhuvu (2008)
- Os Sete Pecados Capitais and Boleia Africana (2014 double CD)
- O Meu Lado B (2016)

=== Singles ===
- "Felizminha" (2007)
- "Wulombe" (2008)
- "Olumwengo" (2009)
- "Xitchuketa Marrabenta" (2010)
- "Caranguejo" (2011)
- "Vale a Pena Casar?" (2011)
- "Txolpela Moçambique" (2013)

=== Compilations ===
- New African World Beat, Vol. 4 (1998, Star Pool/Universal)
- Mozambique Relief (2000, Naxos World)
- Musica da CPLP (2003, Marcelo Salazar)
- Tales of Mozambique (2006, Sheer Sound)
- Nkhuvu (2007)
- Kizomba Mix (2008, Vidisco)
- Sofrimento (2011, UNICEF)
- 30 Anos de Carreira (2012)

== Awards ==
- Best Performance, EME Awards (1983) – "Mulata do MK"
- Press Award, Ngoma Mocambique (1992) – "Josefina"
- Popular Song of the Year, Ngoma Mocambique (1994) – "Julieta"
- Best Song of the Year, Ngoma Mocambique (1996) – "Afrikiti"
- Popular Song of the Year, Ngoma Mocambique (2008)
- Popular Song of the Year, Ngoma Moçambique (2010)
- MOAMAS Best Alternative Song of the Year (2010)
- Mozart Award, UNESCO (Best Musician, 1997)
- Cultural Personality of the Year, 2008 (Jornal Noticias)
- MMA, Best Pop Music (2009) - Olumwengo Remix
- Cultural Personality, 2012 – Jornal Savana
- MMA, Bestselling CD (2013) - 30 Anos de Carreira
- MMA, Best Contemporary Music (2015) - "Xitchuketa Marrabenta"
- MMA, Bestselling CD (2015) - Boleia Africana/Os Sete Pecados Capitais
