= Salane =

Village in Gaza province, Mozambique

- Location within Mozambique
- Coordinates: 25°6′S 33°4′E
- Country: Mozambique
- Provinces: Gaza Province
- Elevation: 196 m (643 ft)
  - Urban density: 129/km^{2} (330/sq mi)

Salane is a small village located on the river Bubye in Mozambique. Salane is also known as Chefe Salane.
