= Clube do Bilene =

Mozambican football club

- Full name: Clube do Bilene
- Ground: Praia do Bilene, Mozambique
- Capacity: 0
- League: Provincial Championship of Gaza

Clube do Bilene is a football (soccer) club based in Praia do Bilene, Mozambique. It plays in the Provincial Championship of Gaza.
