= Bilene Airport =

- IATA: none; ICAO: FQBI

Summary
- Serves: Bilene
- Location: Mozambique
- Elevation AMSL: 131 ft / 40 m
- Coordinates: 25°15′58″S 33°14′19″E

Map

Runways
Direction	Length		Surface
Direction	ft	m	Surface
01/19	2,270	692	Asphalt
- Source: Google Maps

Bilene Airport (ICAO: FQBI) is an airport that serves the town of Bilene, Mozambique.

== Airlines and destinations ==
The airport is currently out of service
