= Chicumbo =

- Location within Mozambique
- Coordinates: 23°11′12″S 33°44′38″E
- Country: Mozambique
- Provinces: Gaza Province

Chicumbo is a town in Gaza Province, Mozambique.

Nearby towns and villages include Mucombo (3.5 nm), Bande (2.9 nm), Valente (1.0 nm), Tchaila (4.3 nm), Manganhane (3.8 nm) and Bananhane (5.3 nm) .
