= 2000 Mozambique flood =

Natural disaster in Mozambique in 2000

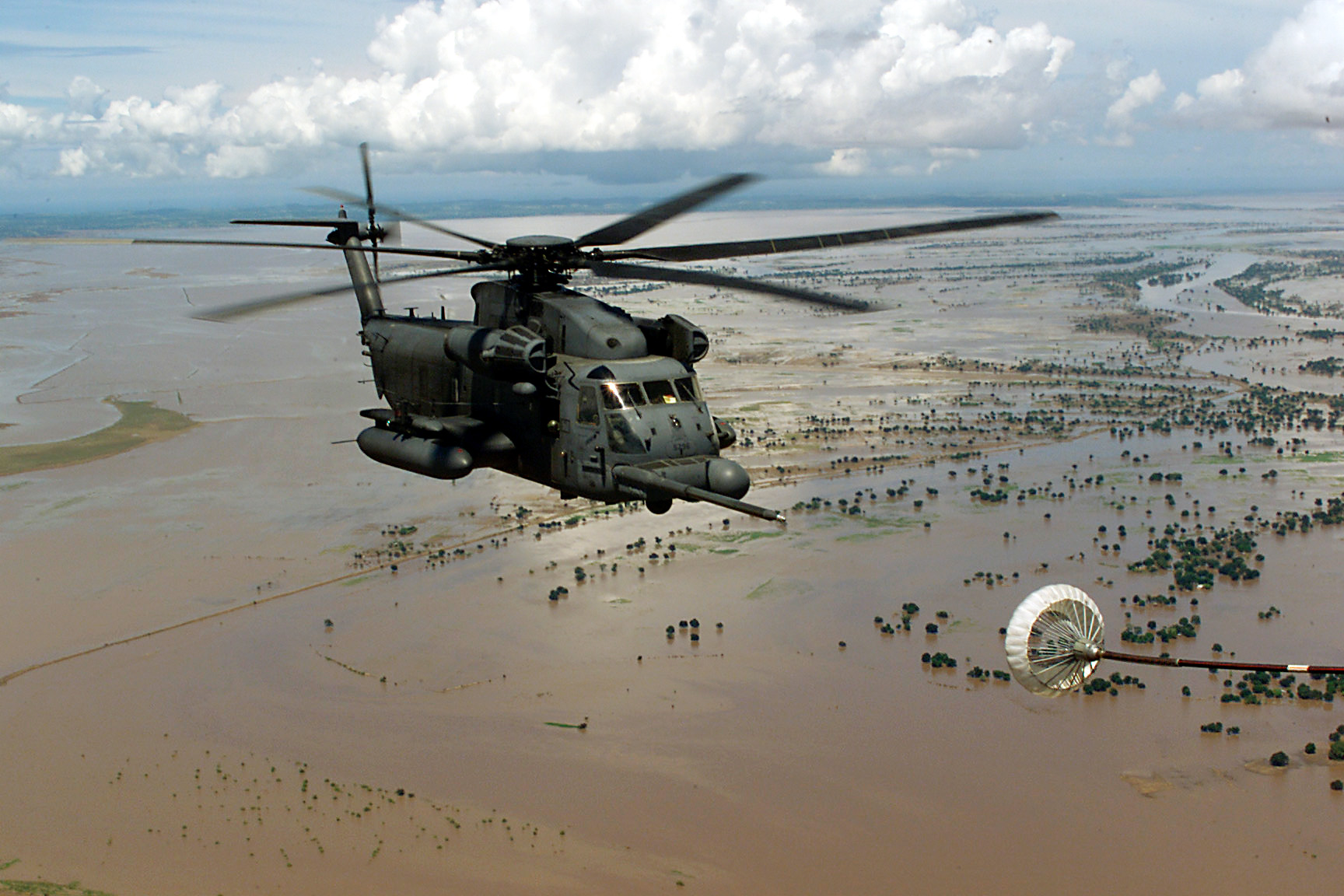
- A helicopter flying over flooded land in Mozambique.

Meteorological history
- Duration: February–March 2000

Overall effects
- Fatalities: 700–800 total
- Damage: $500 million (2000 USD) (Note: All damage totals are in 2000 values of their respective currencies.)
- Areas affected: Southern Mozambique

The 2000 Mozambique flood was a natural disaster that occurred in February and March 2000. The catastrophic flooding was caused by heavy rainfall caused by Cyclone Leon-Eline that lasted for four weeks and made many homeless. Approximately 800 people died, 1400 km^{2} of arable land was affected and 20,000 head of cattle and food were lost. It was the worst flood in Mozambique in 50 years.

== Meteorological history ==
In October and November 1999, heavy rainfall affected Mozambique, followed by a period of heavy rainfall in January 2000. By the end of January 2000, the rains caused the Incomati, the Umbeluzi, and the Limpopo rivers to exceed their banks, inundating portions of the capital Maputo. At Chókwè, the Limpopo River reached a level of 6 m (20 ft) on January 24, twice its normal level. Some areas received a year's worth of rainfall in two weeks. The resultant floods were considered the worst to affect the nations since 1951.

Flooding was beginning to recede in late February by the time Cyclone Eline made landfall. Eline was a long-lasting tropical cyclone that struck near Beira at peak intensity on February 22. By the end of February 2000, the situation was considered the country's worst natural disaster in a century.

== Impact ==
By late February, the flooding had already caused increases in malaria and diarrhea. Flooding also disrupted water supply and covered roads, with the primary north-south highway cut in three locations. Widespread areas were inundated, which displaced about 220,000 people, and killed about 150 people before Eline struck.

The combined effects of the preceding floods and Eline left about 463,000 people displaced or homeless, including 46,000 children five years old or younger. Overall, the preceding floods and Eline caused about 700 deaths, half in Chokwe. with damage estimated at $500 million (2000 USD). The cyclone and the floods disrupted much of the economic progress Mozambique had made in the 1990s since the end of its civil war.

== Aftermath ==
Before the arrival of Eline, the government of Mozambique appealed to the international community for assistance in response to the flooding, and countries were beginning to provide relief. Mozambique's president at the time, Joaquim Chissano, requested for additional aid after Eline struck, asking for $65 million for both reconstruction and emergency aid, and later increasing the request to $160 million. By March 17, various countries had pledged $119 million to Mozambique. By March 4, 39.6 tons of various relief goods reached the country, which nearly overwhelmed the small airport at Maputo.

The government of the Netherlands donated 5 million guilders (US$2.2 million) to the country, following an earlier donation of about 2 million guilders (US$871,000). The Italian government earmarked 10 billion lira, half of which for immediate emergency assistance, and Denmark earmarked €2.68 million euros. Sweden sent 10 million krona and Ireland €507,000 to the World Food Programme. Portugal delivered 40 tons worth of aid, including food, medicine, tents, and dinghies, and the Spanish Red Cross sent two flights of aid. Canada provided about $11.6 million (CAD) to Mozambique, while the United States provided $7 million worth of food via its Agency for International Development, part of its $50 million contribution. The European Community Humanitarian Aid Office provided €25 million in early March. Botswana donated P23 million pula (BWP, US$5 million), and Mauritius provided about $100,000 (USD). The nation of Ghana flew $100,000 worth of food and clothing to Mozambique. Australia also provided $1 million to the country, and Saudi Arabia flew two planes' worth of aid. Concern Worldwide allocated $650,000 (USD) at the end of February. Médecins Sans Frontières sent a crew of five people to Buzi to help residents. The Bill & Melinda Gates Foundation sent $350,000 to CARE in early March. Through the Jubilee 2000, most wealthy nations postponed debt payments for one year. The United Kingdom canceled its $150 million debt in late February, and Italy canceled its $500 million debt in March.

The Mozambique government used boats to evacuate residents in flood zones, setting up 121 camps for evacuees. However, the country had a limited capacity for widespread rescues due to insufficient helicopters. South Africa sent a fleet of twelve planes and helicopters to operate search and rescue missions, as well as airdropping food. They were assisted by two helicopters from Malawi, six from the United Kingdom, and ten from Germany. By March 7, the fleet of 29 helicopters had rescued 14,204 people. Residual floodwaters contributed to outbreaks of malaria and cholera, with malaria infections at four times the usual rate killing at least 11 people. Areas in southern Mozambique also lost access to clean water, furthering dehydration and illnesses. In addition, the United Nations Mine Action Service expressed concern that the floods shifted the locations of landmines left over from the nation's civil war. Later, the remnants of Cyclone Gloria halted relief work due to heavy rainfall. Residents began returning home in early March after floodwaters receded.
