= Phugwane River =

Phugwane River Phugwani Phugwanirivier
- Location within South Africa

Location
- Country: South Africa
- Province: Limpopo

Physical characteristics
- Source
  - location: near Mtititi, Limpopo Province, South Africa
- Mouth: Shingwedzi River
  - location: Kruger National Park
  - coordinates: 23.01777°S 31.32081°E
  - elevation: 290 m (950 ft)

The Phugwane River is a river in Limpopo Province, South Africa. It is a left hand tributary of the Shingwedzi River and the northernmost river of its catchment area, joining it in the middle of its basin. The Phugwane is a seasonal river whose riverbed is dry for prolonged periods.

== Course ==
The Phugwane River drains the plain southeast of the Soutpansberg. Its sources are about 40 km to the ESE of Thohoyandou. In the Mulamulele area it flows eastwards across the lowveld and passes through three villages (Madonsi, Phugwani, and Magona) before entering the area of the Kruger National Park.

== See also ==
- Kruger National Park
- List of rivers of South Africa
