= Chiaquelane =

Refugee camp and village in Gaza Province, Mozambique

- Refugee camp and village
- Location within Mozambique
- Country: Mozambique
- Province: Gaza
- District: Chókwè
- Time zone: UTC+2:00 (CAT)

Chiaquelane is a village and camp for persons displaced by flooding, located about 30 km from the city of Chókwè, Gaza Province, Mozambique.

The village was "created after severe floods in 1977-1978. During that time, the government provided the affected population with plots and fields to entice them to stay in elevated areas." In 2013, the city of Chókwè "was devastated by the flooding of the Limpopo River. Most of its 70,000 residents escaped with whatever they could grab." Many evacuated to Chiaquelane. As of 28 January 2013, an estimated 56,000 people were staying at the camp, out of approximately 150,000 people displaced by the flooding of the Limpopo River.

In January 2013, singer Stewart Sukuma, National Goodwill Ambassador for UNICEF Mozambique, visited flood victims at Chiaquelane.

By mid March, 2013, estimates suggested that "no more than 5,000 families were living more permanently in the Chiaquelane camp. Most of those remaining were women and children, left behind to secure shelter, food and belongings while the men went to Chókwè to assess damages and prepare for return."

The Mozambican government "offered and provided plots for resettlement for the affected families. According to INGC, out of a total of 8,790 planned plots, 1,940 plots have been demarcated with 926 families being resettled, including 403 families in the district of Chokwe."

Américo Ubisse, the general secretary of the Mozambican Red Cross, has commented:

”We should encourage people in this area to have two houses,” said Ubisse - a permanent house in the high areas where their children can go to school, and a temporary house to live in while working on their fields. “There is enough land in the high areas to do this.”
