= Massingir Dam =

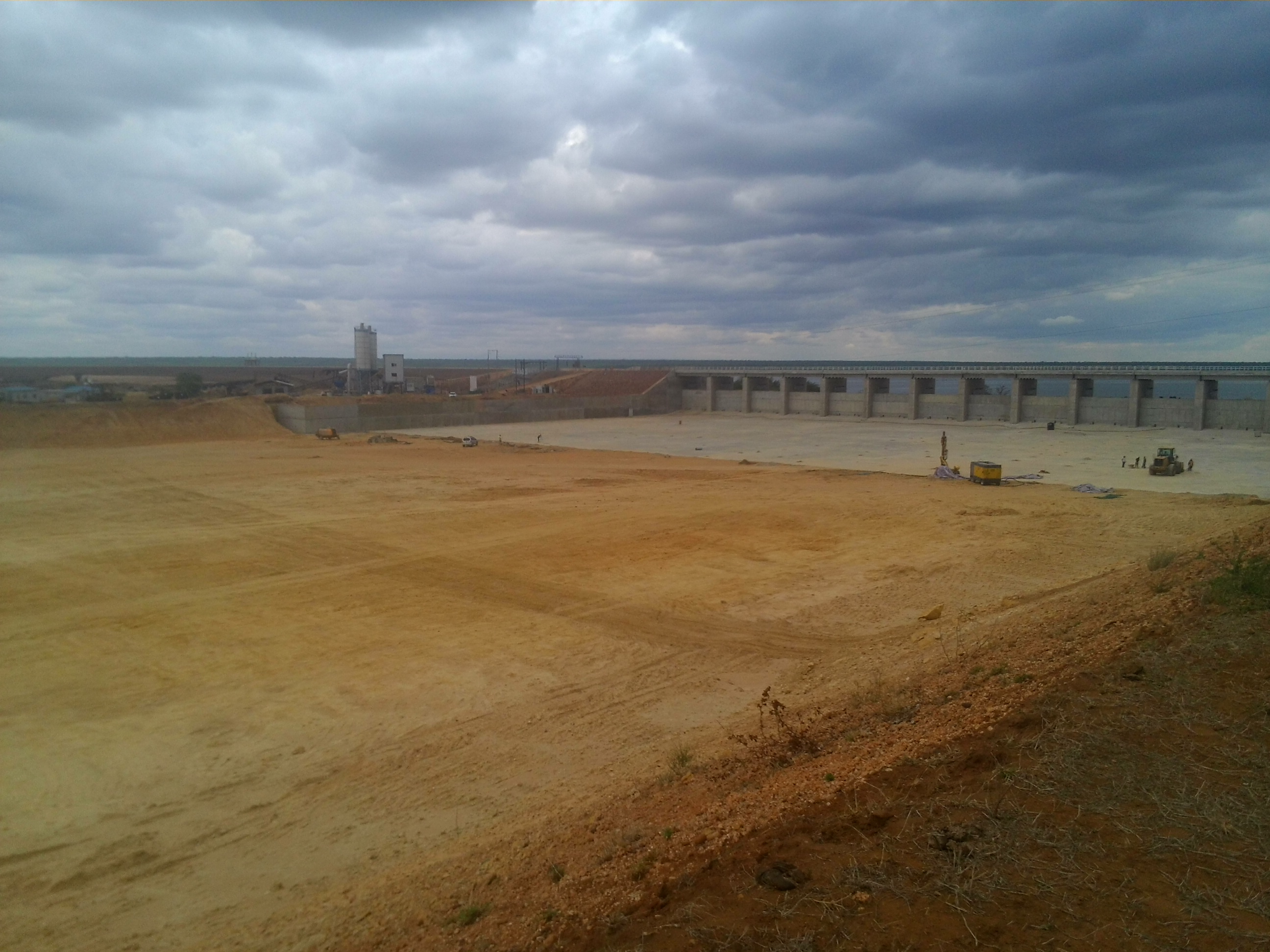

- Location within Mozambique
- Official name: Barragem de Massingir
- Location: Massingir District, Gaza, Mozambique
- Coordinates: 23°52′45″S 32°8′40″E
- Construction began: 1971
- Opening date: 2006

Dam and spillways
- Impounds: Rio dos Elefantes
- Height: 46 m (151 ft)

Reservoir
- Creates: Massingir Lake
- Total capacity: 2.88 km^{3} (2,330,000 acre⋅ft)
- Surface area: 150 km^{2} (58 sq mi)

Massingir Dam is a dam on the Rio dos Elefantes (Olifants or Lepelle), Gaza Province, Mozambique. It is named after the town of Massingir, in Massingir District. The Shingwedzi River flows close to the northeastern side of the reservoir and joins the Rio dos Elefantes about 12 kilometres (7.5 mi) downstream from the dam wall.

== History ==
By 1975, before the dam's completion, Mozambique gained independence and construction came to a halt. Shortly thereafter the FRELIMO government restarted the project, but by the early 1980s economic decline and war time conditions halted further progress. A failure to maintain dam infrastructure or invest further in completion resulted in the Massingir dam not fulfilling its original purpose and full potential in the irrigation schemes of the Limpopo Valley downstream at Chokwe.

During the period of post conflict reconstruction that followed conclusion to the civil war in 1994 a rehabilitation programme costing US$61m was undertaken, concluding in 2007. The dam now holds a reservoir with storage capacity of 2.8 billion cubic metres (2,300,000 acre⋅ft) of water, making it the second largest in the country. Further works now in course involve construction of a new spill-way and installation of a 25 megawatts (34,000 hp) hydro-electric power plant.

The Massingir Dam is located within Limpopo National Park, forming part of the Great Limpopo Transfrontier Park. The area is an important breeding ground for the Nile Crocodile and there was concern at the Kruger National Park regarding the flooding of the Olifants River Gorge.

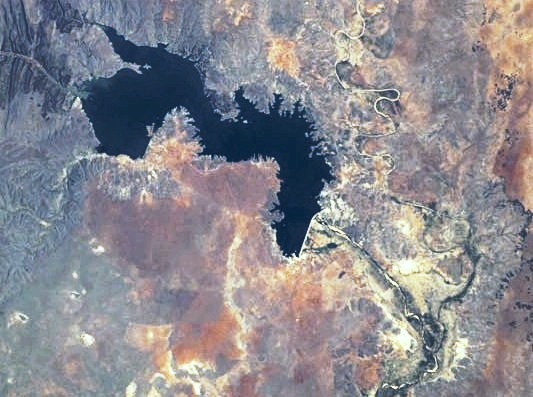
NASA picture of the Massingir Dam showing also the confluence of the Shingwedzi River and the Rio dos Elefantes

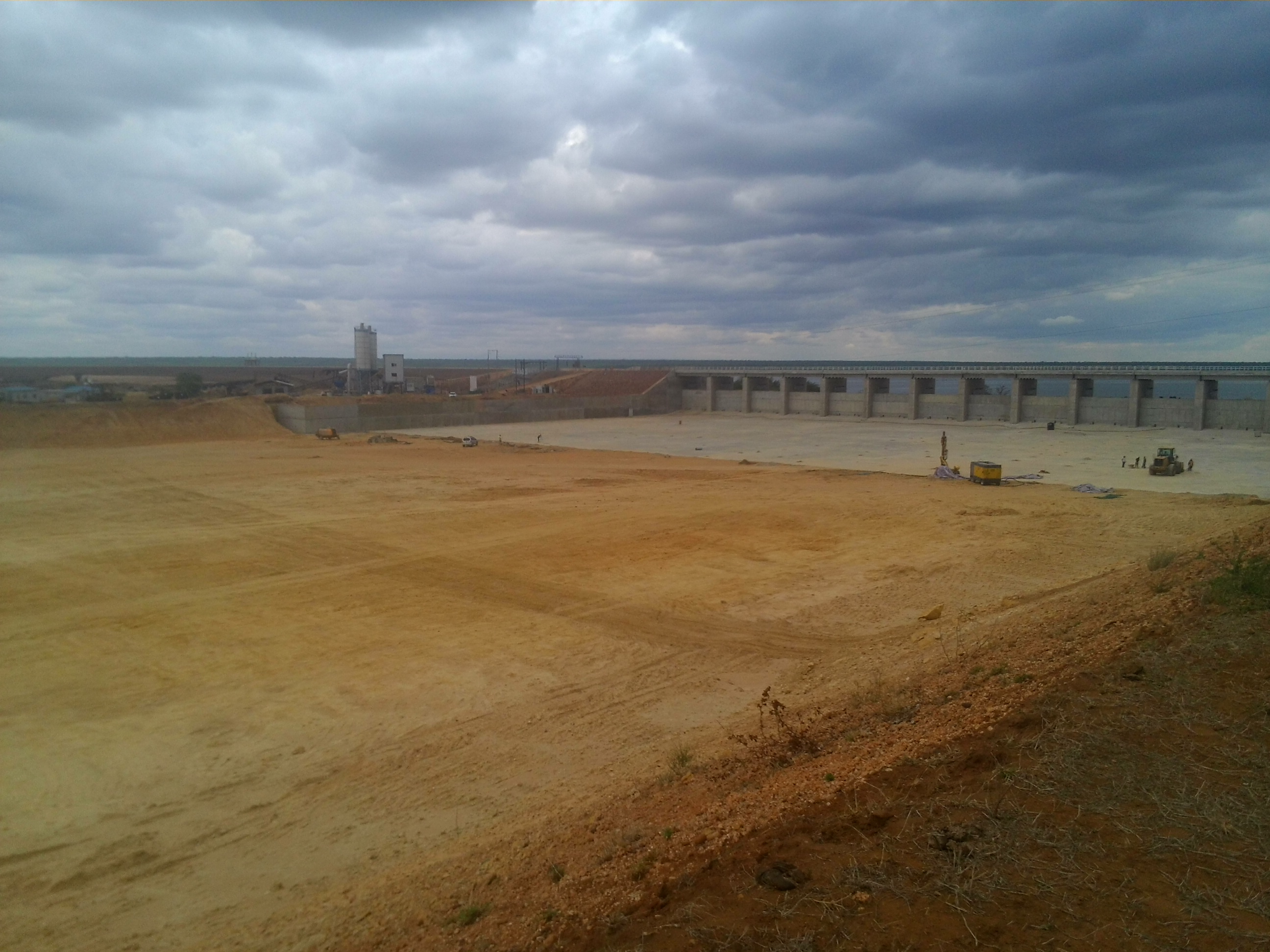
Dam wall of Massingir dam, Mozambique, during the raising of the wall, December 2014

== See also ==
- List of dams and reservoirs
