= Chókwè District =

Coordinates: 13.380°S 39.952°E

Chókwè
- District
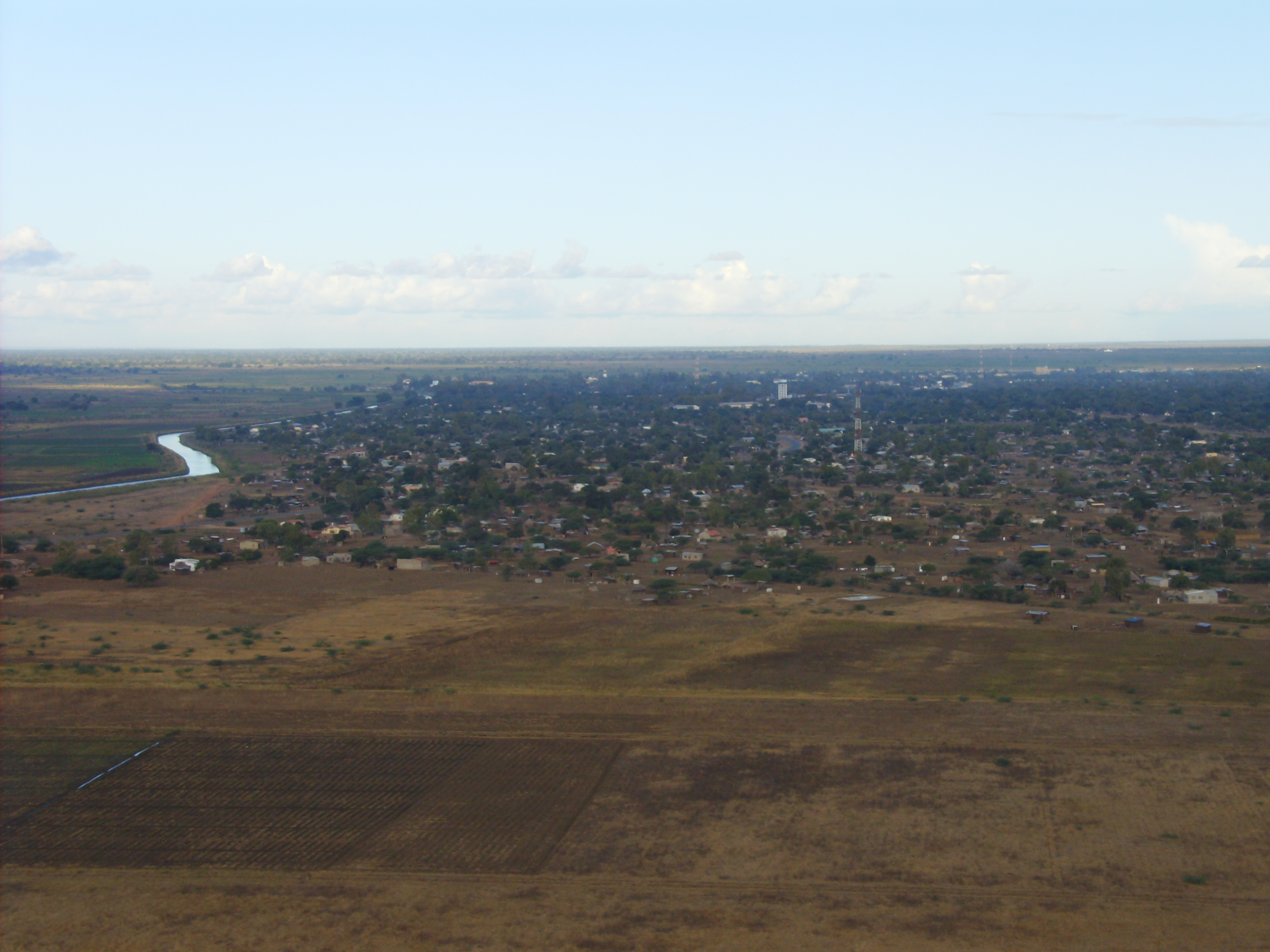
- Aerial view of Chókwè

- Chókwè District on the map of Mozambique
- Country: Mozambique
- Province: Gaza
- Capital: Chokwe

Area
  - Total: 2,466 km^{2} (952 sq mi)

Population (2007 census)
  - Total: 187,422
  - Density: 76.00/km^{2} (196.8/sq mi)

Chókwè District is a district of Gaza Province in south-western Mozambique. Its principal town is Chokwe. The district is located in the south of the province, and borders with Mabalane District in the north, Guijá District in the east, Chibuto, Xai-Xai, and Bilene Macia Districts in the southeast, Magude District of Maputo Province in the south, and with Massingir District in the west. The area of the district is 2,466 square kilometres (952 mi^{2}). It has a population of 187,422 (2007).

It is regarded as the economic capital of Gaza Province. Chokwe District has one of the most extensive health networks in Mozambique. It is inhabited by Tsonga-shangaan speaking people. However, in the post independence period it has seen an influx of people from other ethnic groups. Chokwe, being in the Limpopo Corridor, is also home to many Zimbabwean immigrants. It has banks, a community radio station (Radio Vembe), and a train station.

In 2013, singer Stewart Sukuma, National Goodwill Ambassador for UNICEF Mozambique, visited flood victims at the Chiaquelane accommodation center in Chókwè District, evacuated due to flooding of the Limpopo River.

== Geography ==
The whole district is flat, with the maximum altitude below 100 metres (330 ft) above the sea level, and located in the valley of the Limpopo River, which traverses the district from northwest to southeast. A major right tributary of the Limpopo is the Olifants River.

The climate is tropical semi-arid, with the average annual rainfall ranging 500 millimetres (20 in) and 800 millimetres (31 in).

== Demographics ==
As of 2005, 44% of the population of the district was younger than 15 years. 54% of the population spoke Portuguese. The most common mothertongue among the population was Tsonga. 58% were analphabetic, mostly women.

== Administrative divisions ==
The four administrative divisions (posto administrativo) are:

- Chókwè, capital (one locality)
- Lionde (three localities, includes Conhane and Malau)
- Macarretane, (three localities, includes Matamba and Machindo).
- Chilembene, (three localities, includes Chiduachine and la villa Chilembene).

== Economy ==
=== Agriculture ===
In the district, there are 31,000 farms which have on average 2.1 hectares (0.0081 mi^{2}) of land. The main agricultural products are corn, cassava, cowpea, peanut, sweet potato, and rice.

=== Transportation ===
There is a road network in the district of the total length of 510 kilometres (320 mi), including a 160 kilometres (99 mi) of national roads. The bridge over the Limpopo River on the road connecting Caniçado and Chokwe was destroyed by Rhodesian forces in 1978, and a new bridge was only completed at the end of 2007. The Limpopo Railroad (Southern System) runs through the district, connecting Maputo and Chicualacuala.
