= Gaza Province =

Province of Mozambique

Coordinates: 23°45′S 32°45′E

Gaza
- Province
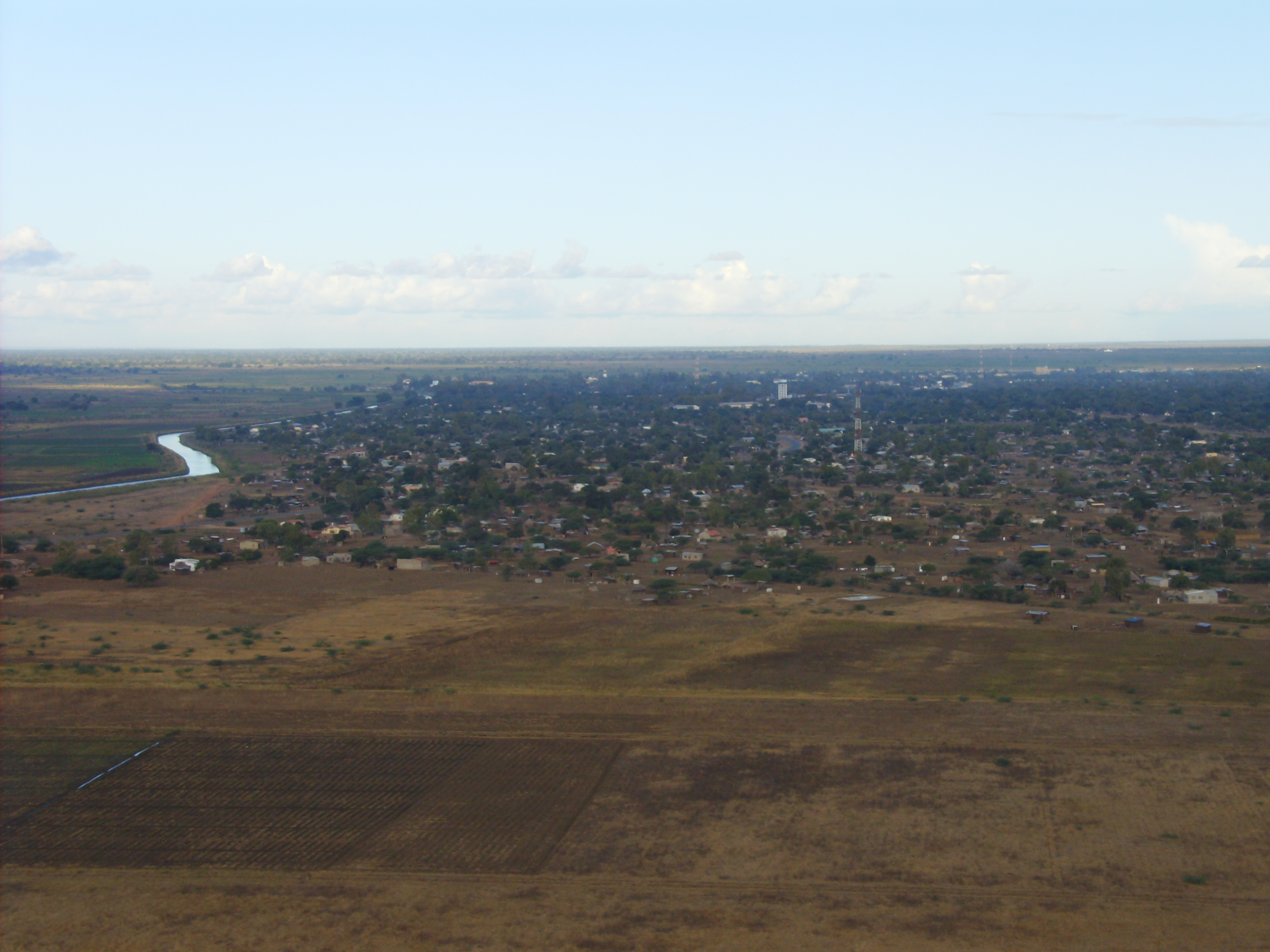
- Aerial view of Chokwe

- Gaza, Province of Mozambique
- Country: Mozambique
- Named for: Gaza Empire
- Capital: Xai-Xai

Government
  - Governor: Margarida Mapanzene

Area
  - Total: 75,709 km^{2} (29,231 sq mi)

Population (2017)
  - Total: 1,422,460
  - Density: 18.789/km^{2} (48.662/sq mi)
- Postal code: 12xx
- Area code: (+258) 281, 282
- HDI (2019): 0.449 low · 6th of 11
- Website: www.gaza.gov.mz

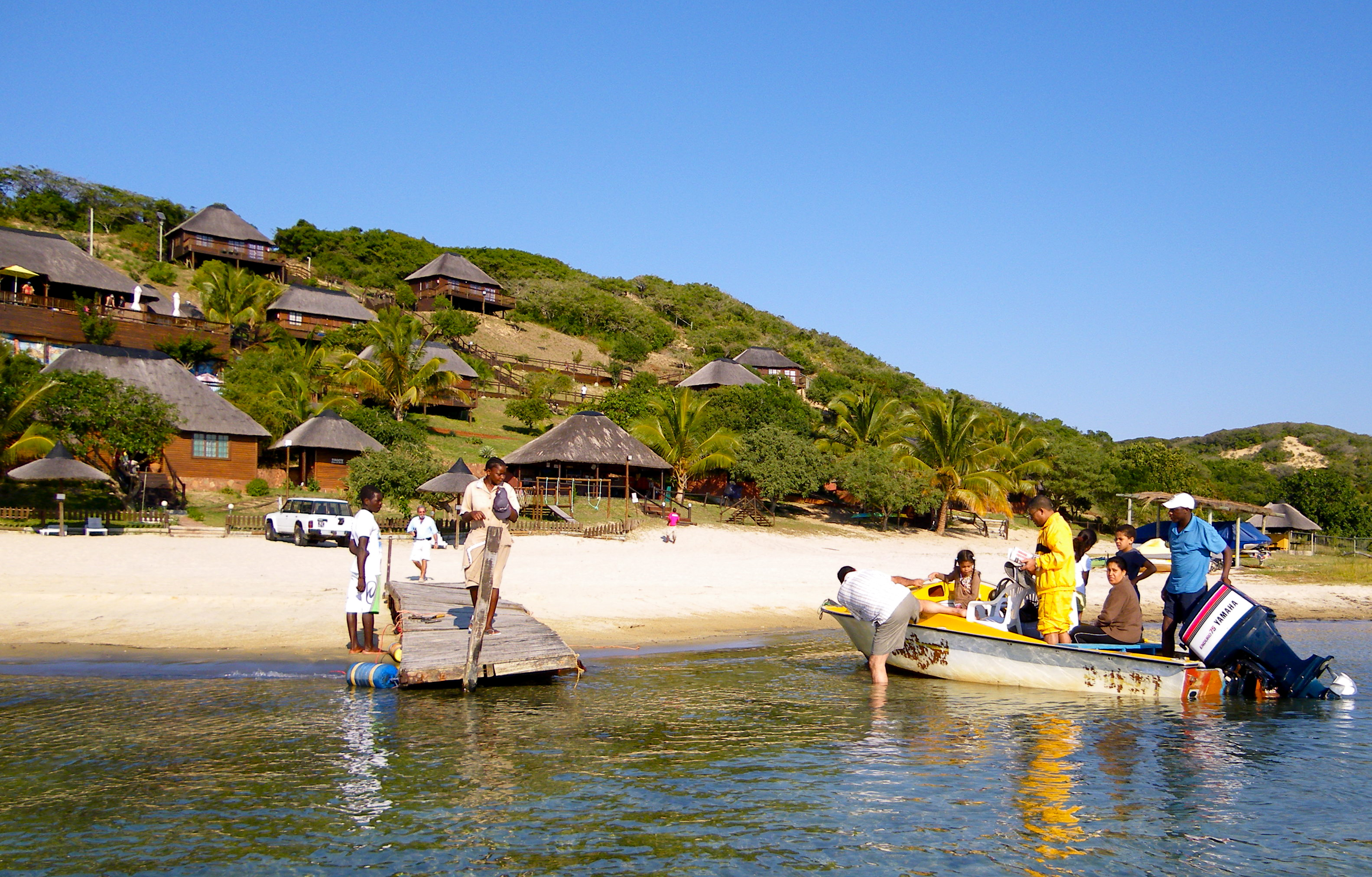
Bilene Beach

Gaza is a province of Mozambique. It has an area of 75,709 km^{2} and a population of 1,422,460 (2017 census), which is the least populous of all the provinces of Mozambique. Xai-Xai is the capital of the province.

It borders Inhambane Province is to the east, Manica Province to the north, Maputo Province to the south, South Africa to the west, and Zimbabwe to the northwest.

== History ==
The province gets its name from the Gaza Empire, named after the grandfather of the First Monarch of the Gaza Empire, Soshangane. His great-grandson, Ngungunhane, known as “Lion of Gaza” was the last emperor of the Gaza Empire and the final monarch of the Nxumalo dynasty. Portuguese emissaries attempted to have him sign treaties recognizing Portugal's sovereignty in the region in 1885. Ngungunhane, however, refused to sign these treaties. On November 7, 1895, a direct confrontation between the Portuguese and Ngungunhane's forces took place in Coolela, leading to Ngungunhane fleeing to Chaimite for refuge.

The territories of the Gaza Empire are now ruled by Mozambique, South Africa and Zimbabwe. The province correlates roughly to the portion of the empire that is within the borders of Mozambique.

== Geography ==
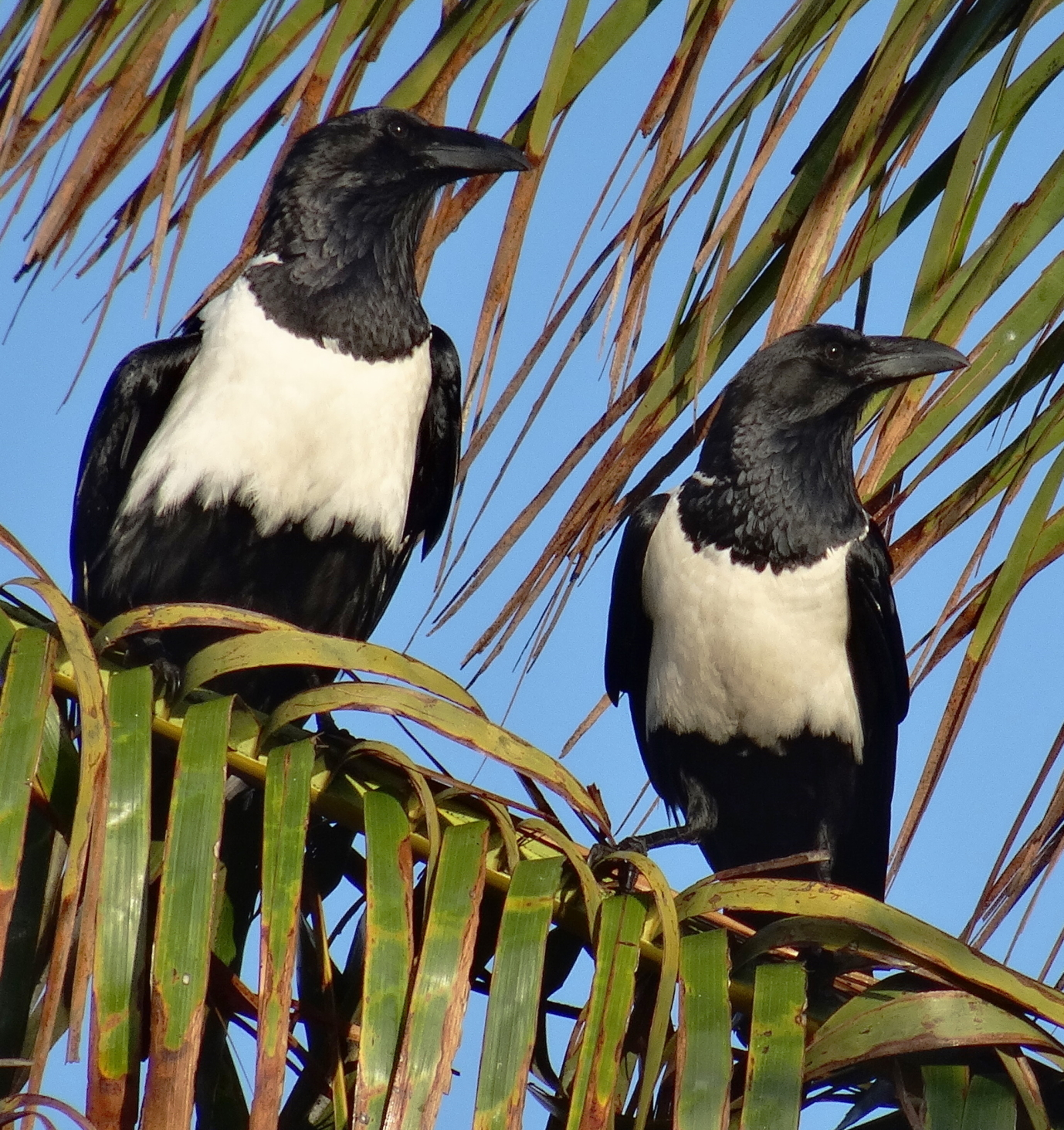
Pied crows (Corvus albus) in a coconut palm, close to Xai-Xai, Gaza Province

Most of the province lies in the basin of the Limpopo River, which runs from northwest to southeast through the province, emptying into the Indian Ocean near Xai-Xai. The Changane River, a tributary of the Limpopo, forms part of the province's eastern boundary. The Rio dos Elefantes (Olifants River) flows into the province from the west through the Massingir Dam, to empty into the Limpopo.

The Save River forms the northern boundary of the province.

The Limpopo railway, which connects Zimbabwe and Botswana to the port of Maputo, runs through the province, entering Zimbabwe at the border town of Chicualacuala.

The province, including the towns of Xai-Xai and Chokwe, were greatly affected by the 2000 Mozambique flood amid the month-long heavy rainfall accompanying Cyclone Leon-Eline.

Limpopo National Park lies within the province, bounded by the Olifants and Limpopo rivers and the South African border. Banhine National Park lies in the east-central portion of the province. The Great Limpopo Transfrontier Park and its associated conservation area, which is in the process of being formed, will cover the northern part of the province, including both national parks, and extend into adjacent parts of Mozambique, South Africa, and Zimbabwe.

== Districts ==
The province was created on October 20, 1954, when Sul do Save District was divided into the districts of Gaza, Inhambane, and Lourenço Marques (later renamed Maputo). In 1978, Mozambique's districts were renamed provinces.

Gaza Province is divided into 14 districts:

- Bilene Macia District
- Chibuto District
- Chicualacuala District
- Chigubo District
- Chonguene District
- Mapai District
- Chókwè District
- Guijá District
- Limpopo District

and the municipalities of:

- Chibuto
- Praia do Bilene
- Chókwè
- Macia
- Manjacaze
- Xai-Xai

Limpopo District is one of the 14 Districts of Gaza Province. It was carved out of the existing district of Xai-Xai and the District of Bilene Macia in 2016, stretching from the Administrative Post of Chissano to its south and north of the city of Macia on the national EN 1 highway. It includes Administrative Posts of Licilo, Chicumbane and others. To the north, it borders the provincial capital city of Xai Xai on the bank of Limpopo River. The districts lies in the Limpopo Basin.

== Economy ==
The province of Gaza is practically rural. It has no industrial economic activities of note. Subsistence farming is the order of the day.

== Transport ==
The province is served by the national EN 1 highway.

== Population ==
The province has approximately 1,422,460 (as of the 2017 census), with its largest city of Xai-Xai having a population of 116,343.

== People and education ==
The province is inhabited by the Shangaan people. The dominant languages are Shangaan and Portuguese.

Forty percent of the population can read and write. Education in the Gaza province still requires massive investment. Many students still study under the trees.

In February 2025, USAID condoms were falsely reported to have been sent to Gaza Strip whereupon fact-checkers confirmed that the condoms were being sent to the Gaza Province.

== Demographics ==
Historical population
| Year | Pop. | ±% p.a. |
|---|---|---|
| 1980 | 990,900 | — |
| 1997 | 1,116,903 | +0.71% |
| 2007 | 1,236,284 | +1.02% |
| 2017 | 1,422,460 | +1.41% |

== See also ==
- Chicumbo
- Gazaland
- Salane
