= Chissano =

Chissano is a surname. Notable people with the surname include:

- Alberto Chissano (1935–1994), Mozambican sculptor
- João Chissano (born 1970), Mozambican football manager
- Joaquim Chissano (born 1939), Mozambican politician
- Nyimpine Chissano (1970–2007), Mozambican businessman
