= Chokwe, Mozambique =

Chokwe
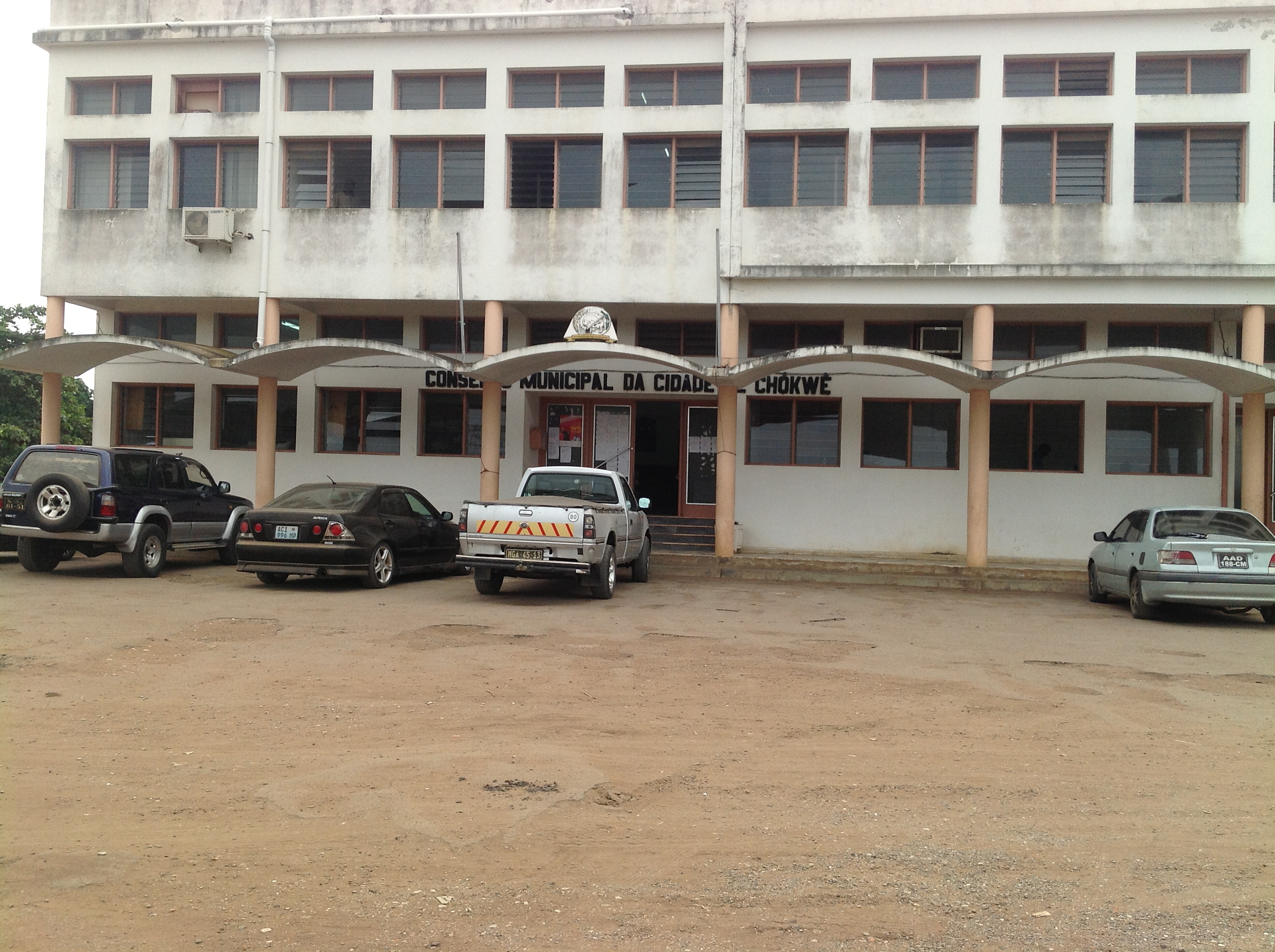
- Chókwè Municipal Council Building

- Location within Mozambique
- Coordinates: 24°31′31″S 33°0′31″E
- Country: Mozambique
- Provinces: Gaza Province

Population (2007 census)
  - Total: 53,062

Chokwé, previously known as Vila Trigo de Morais, is a rural town and capital of Chokwe District in the province of Gaza in Mozambique. It is located about 230 kilometres (140 mi) north of the capital city of Maputo. This agricultural town is noted for its tomatoes. Local services are overseen by the town's Municipal Council.

== Flooding ==
The town and its surroundings are vulnerable to flooding caused by the rising waters of the Limpopo River.

In 2013, the city "was devastated" by the flooding river. Many of its residents were evacuated to the Chiaquelane accommodation center. Oxfam UK has noted that blockages in drainage channels also exacerbate the impact of river floods, and reported in 2026 on a community project aimed at removing and recycling materials which were blocking the town's main drainage channel.

== Demographics ==
Year	Population
1997	51,635
2008	61,666
2013	70,000 (est.)

== Transport ==
Chokwe is served by a station on the southern line of Mozambique Railways.

== See also ==
- Transport in Mozambique
- Railway stations in Mozambique
