= Bilene =

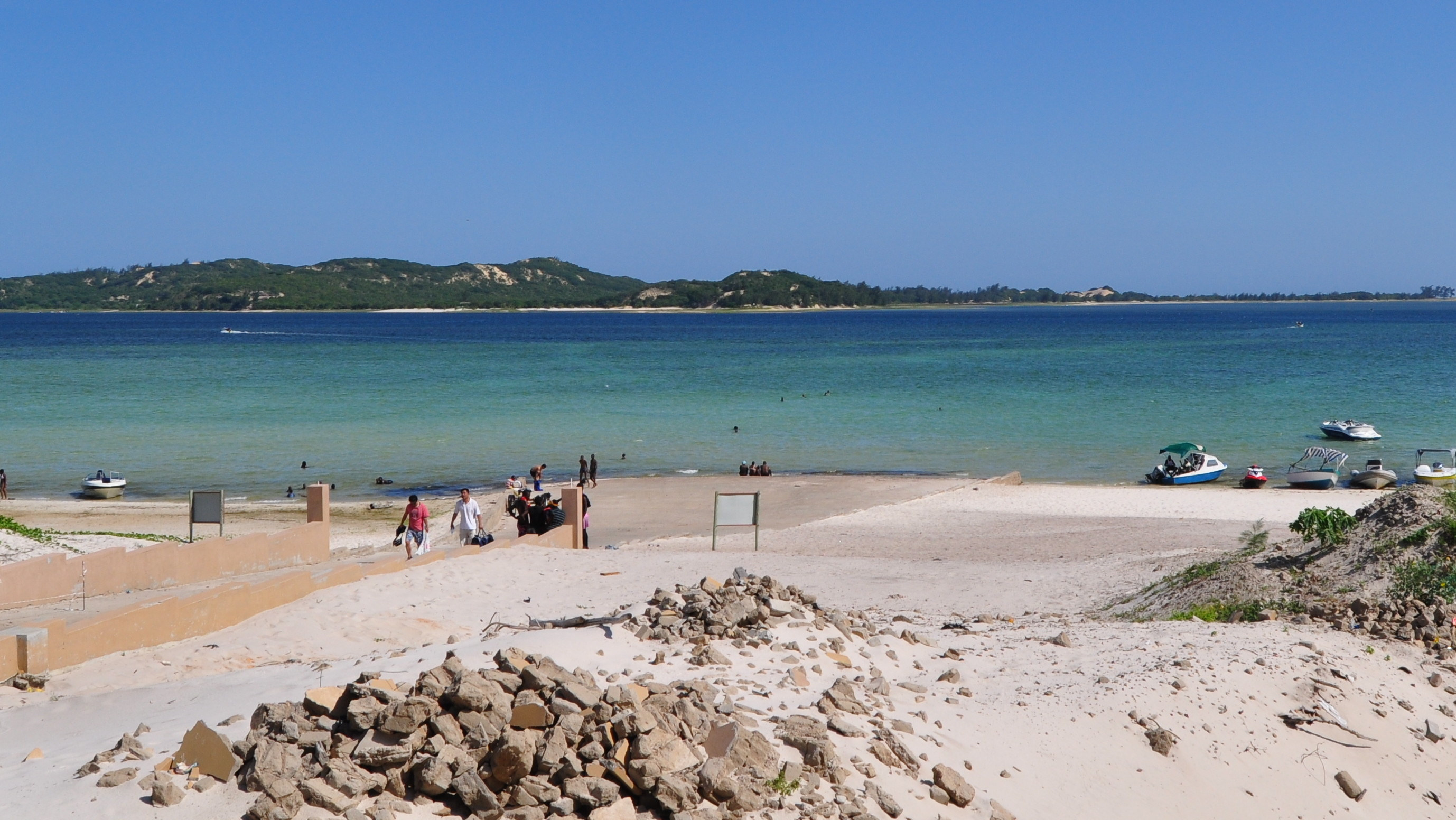
- Beach of Praia de Bilene, Mozambique

- Location within Mozambique
- Coordinates: 25°10′0″S 33°11′30″E
- Country: Mozambique
- Provinces: Gaza Province

Bilene, also known as Praia do Bilene, is a town in southern Mozambique, lying 140 kilometres northeast of Maputo in the province of Gaza. It is a popular beach resort on the Mozambique Channel, noted for its calm and clear waters of Uembje Lagoon, which is separated from the open Indian Ocean by a line of high sand dunes. Bilene is often described as the closest beach destination to the city of Johannesburg in neighboring South Africa.

== Transportation ==
The town has an airport called Bilene Airport, currently disused.

== Tourism ==
Popular tourist activities in Bilene include sailing, canoeing, windsurfing, snorkelling, paragliding and kite surfing.

== See also ==
- Clube do Bilene
