= Inhambane (disambiguation) =

Inhambane may refer to:

- Inhambane, city located in southern Mozambique
- Inhambane Province, province of Mozambique located on the coast in the southern part of the country
- Inhambane Airport, airport in Jangamo District, Inhambane Province, Mozambique
