= List of cities in Mozambique by population =

This is a list of the most populous cities and towns of Mozambique. It is based on the most recent census done for each city or town.

From these 17 cities shown here they all collectively have a population of 6 million while the population of the entire country ranges at 29 million thus showing that majority of the population still live in rural areas.

Rank	City	Population	Census date	Province
1	Maputo	1,101,170	2017	Maputo City
2	Matola	1,032,197	2017	Maputo
3	Nampula	743,125	2017	Nampula
4	Beira	533,825	2017	Sofala
5	Chimoio	372,821	2017	Manica
6	Quelimane	349,842	2017	Zambezia
7	Tete	305,722	2017	Tete
8	Nacala	225,034	2017	Nampula
9	Lichinga	213,361	2017	Niassa
10	Pemba	201,846	2017	Cabo Delgado
11	Mocuba	168,736	2007	Zambezia
12	Gurúè	145,466	2007	Zambezia
13	Xai-Xai	143,128	2017	Gaza
14	Maxixe	123,868	2017	Inhambane
15	Angoche	103,769	2017	Nampula
16	Inhambane	79,724	2017	Inhambane
17	Cuamba	79,013	2007	Niassa

== See also ==
- List of cities in Mozambique
