= Palaeorhincodon =

Palaeorhincodon Temporal range: 60–35 Ma

Scientific classification
- Kingdom: Animalia
- Phylum: Chordata
- Class: Chondrichthyes
- Subclass: Elasmobranchii
- Division: Selachii
- Order: Orectolobiformes
- Family: Rhincodontidae
- Genus: †Palaeorhincodon; Herman, 1974

Type species
- †Palaeorhincodon wardi Herman, 1974

Other species
- †P. daouii Noubhani & Cappetta, 1997; †P. dartevellei Arambourg, 1952

Extinct genus of sharks

Palaeorhincodon (meaning "old Rhincodon") is an extinct genus of prehistoric whale shark from the Early Paleocene and Late Eocene periods. It had a similar distribution range to that of modern whale sharks, with teeth from Palaeorhincodon being found in warm water areas such as North America, Europe, Asia, and Africa. Some fossil teeth of Palaeorhincodon was found in possible Late Jurassic deposits. Its teeth are very small, being only 3 millimeters in height. There are up to 300 files of teeth in each jaw of Palaeorhincodon.

== Taxonomy ==
=== History ===
In 1974, the paleontologist Jacques Herman described the fossil of a new genus of prehistoric whale shark, Palaeorhincodon, naming its type species, P. wardi, based on the holotype IRSNB P05823, among other specimens, with paratypes. Previously, a species described from the genus Squatirhina, known as S. dartevellei, was also reclassified into the same genus as P. wardi. In 1997, a new previously undescribed species of this same genus, P. daouii, was named. Since then, Palaeorhincodon has been placed as a genus having only 3 known species.

=== Undescribed species ===
Some fossils were attributed to Palaeorhincodon, many of them found in possible Upper Jurassic deposits and mainly from the Lower Eocene.

== Ecology ==
Palaeorhicodon presumedly behaved similarly to extant whale sharks, feeding on plankton and larger pelagic animals like small crustaceans, fish and squid.
