= Rhincodon ferriolensis =

Rhincodon ferriolensis Temporal range: Burdigalian

Scientific classification
- Kingdom: Animalia
- Phylum: Chordata
- Class: Chondrichthyes
- Subclass: Elasmobranchii
- Division: Selachii
- Order: Orectolobiformes
- Family: Rhincodontidae
- Genus: Rhincodon
- Species: †R. ferriolensis

Binomial name
- †Rhincodon ferriolensis Mediola, 1996

Extinct species of whale shark

Rhincodon ferriolensis is an extinct species of whale shark that lived in Miocene epoch, in the late Burdigalian age.
