= Tofinho =

Praia do Tofinho Tofinho, Mozambique Tofinho
- Nickname: finho
- Location within Mozambique
- Coordinates: 23°51′57″S 35°33′12″E
- Country: Mozambique
- Province: Inhambane Province
- Elevation: 10 m (33 ft)

Population (1997)
  - Total: 300
- Time zone: +1
- Postal code: 1703
- Area code: +258

Tofinho Beach (pt: Praia do Tofinho) or simply Tofinho is a tourist Beach, Monument and Residential area in southeastern Mozambique. This holiday settlement lies on the Indian Ocean coast, on the Ponta da Barra peninsula in Inhambane Province, 1.5km south of Tofo, 25km Northeast of Inhambane in Mozambique.
