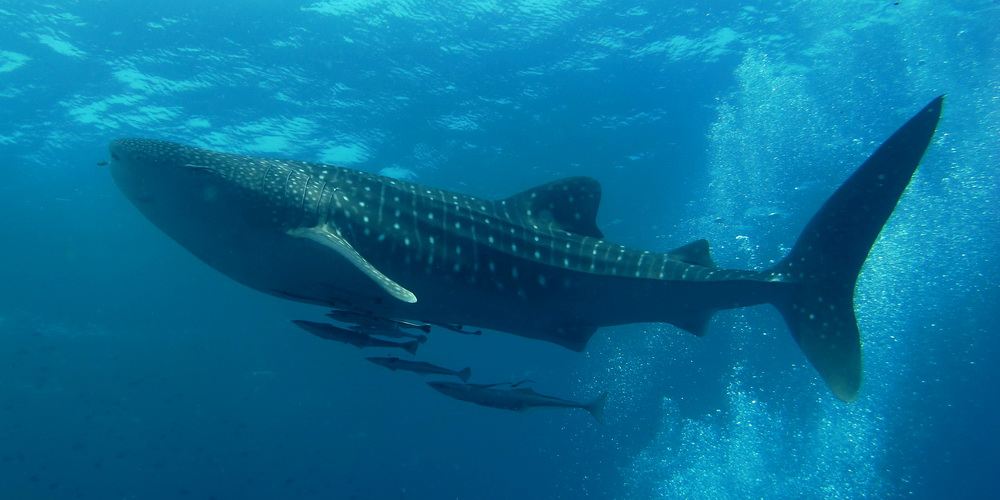
- Whale shark in the Andaman Sea around the Similan Islands

Conservation status
- Endangered (IUCN 3.1)
- CITES Appendix II

Scientific classification
- Kingdom: Animalia
- Phylum: Chordata
- Class: Chondrichthyes
- Subclass: Elasmobranchii
- Division: Selachii
- Order: Orectolobiformes
- Family: Rhincodontidae
- Genus: Rhincodon; A. Smith, 1829
- Species: R. typus

Binomial name
- Rhincodon typus (A. Smith, 1828)
- Range of whale shark

Synonyms
- Micristodus punctatus Gill, 1865; Rhineodon Denison, 1937; Rhiniodon typus A. Smith, 1828; Rhinodon cookieineatus Kishinouye, 1901; Rhinodon typicus Müller & Henle, 1839

= Whale shark =

Whale shark Temporal range: Early Oligocene-recent, 28.4–0 Ma

Largest living species of fish

Size of whale shark individuals with a human for scale

The whale shark (Rhincodon typus) is a slow-moving, filter-feeding carpet shark and the largest known extant fish species. An individual with a length of 18.8 m (61.7 ft) has been considered the largest reliably recorded. The whale shark holds many records for size in the animal kingdom, most notably being by far the largest living non-cetacean animal. It is the only living species of the genus Rhincodon and the only extant member of the family Rhincodontidae, which belongs to the subclass Elasmobranchii in the class Chondrichthyes. Before 1984, it was classified as Rhiniodon into Rhinodontidae. An extinct species, Rhincodon ferriolensis, was described in Europe (probably in Spain), in the Late Burdigalian stage.

The whale shark is an active filter feeder, primarily consuming plankton, krill, fish eggs, and small schooling fish such as sardines and anchovies. The shark can process over 6,000 liters of water per hour through its specialized sieve-like gill pads. Highly migratory, the whale shark travels thousands of kilometres across tropical oceans to exploit seasonal food sources, with large, predictable feeding aggregations occurring at coastal sites such as Ningaloo Reef in Western Australia, the Yucatan Peninsula in Mexico, and off the coast of Gujarat and Kerala in India. Despite its immense size, the whale shark is docile and poses no significant threat to humans. It is currently listed as an Endangered species on the IUCN Red List owing to a population decline of more than 50% over the last 75 years, primarily as a result of targeted fishing, bycatch in other fisheries, and collisions with large ships.

Whale sharks inhabit the open waters of all tropical oceans, typically between 30°N and 35°S latitude, occasionally as high as 41°N and 36.5°S. They are rarely found in water below 21 °C (70 °F). The lifespan of a whale shark is estimated to be between 80 and 130 years, based on studies of their vertebral growth bands and the growth rates of free-swimming sharks.

The species was distinguished in April 1828 after the harpooning of a 4.6 m (15 ft) specimen in Table Bay, South Africa. Andrew Smith, a military doctor associated with British troops stationed in Cape Town, described it the following year. The name "whale shark" refers to the animal's appearance and large size; it is a fish, not a mammal, and, like all sharks, is not closely related to whales.

== Evolution ==
The whale shark is one of the most ancient shark species still extant today, with the earliest fossil teeth known from the Late Oligocene of South Carolina, US. Their teeth become more geographically widespread from the Early Miocene onwards, where they are known from other parts of the eastern United States, southern France, and Costa Rica.

== Description ==
Whale sharks possess a broad, flattened head with a large mouth and two small eyes located at the front corners. Unlike many other sharks, whale shark mouths are located at the front of the head rather than on the underside of the head. Their mouths can be exceptionally wide; a 12.1 m (39.7 ft) individual was reported to have a mouth measuring 1.55 m (5 ft 1.0 in) across. Whale shark mouths can contain over 300 rows of tiny teeth and 20 filter pads which it uses to filter feed. The spiracles are located just behind the eyes. Whale sharks have five large pairs of gills. Their skin is dark grey with a white belly marked with an arrangement of pale grey or white spots and stripes that are unique to each individual. The skin can be up to 15 cm (5.9 in) thick and is very hard and rough to the touch. The whale shark has three prominent ridges along its sides, which start above and behind the head and end at the caudal peduncle. The shark has two dorsal fins set relatively far back on the body, a pair of pectoral fins, a pair of pelvic fins and a single medial anal fin. The caudal fin has a larger upper lobe than the lower lobe (heterocercal).

Whale sharks have been found to possess dermal denticles on the surface of their eyeballs that are structured differently from their body denticles. The dermal denticles, as well as the whale shark's ability to retract its eyes deep into their sockets, serve to protect the eyes from damage.

Evidence suggests that whale sharks can recover from major injuries and may be able to regenerate small sections of their fins. Their spot markings have been shown to reform over a previously wounded area.

The complete and annotated genome of the whale shark was published in 2017.

Rhodopsin, the light-sensing pigment in the rod cells of the retina, is normally sensitive to green and used to see in dim light, but in the whale shark (and the bottom-dwelling cloudy catshark) two amino acid substitutions make the pigment more sensitive to blue light instead, the light that dominates the deep ocean. One of these mutations makes rhodopsin vulnerable to higher temperatures. In humans, a similar mutation leads to congenital stationary night blindness, as the human body temperature makes the pigment decay. This pigment becomes unstable in shallow water, where the temperature is higher and the full spectrum of light is present. To protect from this instability, the whale shark deactivates the pigment when in shallow water (otherwise the pigment would hinder full color vision). In the colder environment at 2,000 metres below the surface, it is reactivated. The mutations thus allow the shark to see well at both ends of its vertical range. The eyes have also lost all cone opsins except LWS.

=== Size ===
The whale shark is the largest non-cetacean animal in the world. The maximum size and growth patterns of the species are not well understood by scientists.

Limited evidence, mostly from males, suggests that sexual maturity occurs around 8 to 9 meters (26 to 30 ft) in length, with the possibility of females sexually maturing at a similar size or larger.

Various studies have aimed to estimate the growth and longevity of whale sharks, either by analyzing evidence from vertebral growth rings or measurements taken from re-sighted sharks over several years. This information is used to model growth curves, which can predict asymptotic length. The growth curves produced from these studies have estimated asymptotic lengths ranging from 15 to 21.9 m (49 to 72 ft).

A 2020 study looked at the growth of whale shark individuals over a 10-year period around the Ningaloo Reef and concluded the species exhibits sexual dimorphism with regard to size, with females growing larger than males. The study found that males on average reach 8 to 9 m (26 to 30 ft) in length. The same study had less female data but estimated an average length of around 14.5 m (48 ft). This value dropped to 12.1 m (40 ft) if data from aquarium whale sharks was included. The authors noted that these estimates represent average asymptotic size and are not the maximum sizes possible. Additionally, they acknowledged the potential for regional size variation.

Most previous growth studies have data predominately from males and none have data from sharks over ~10 m (33 ft). Not all previous studies created separate growth curves for males and females, instead combining data from both sexes. Those studies that made sex-specific growth curves have estimated large asymptotic length estimates for males, with lengths of 18 m (59 ft) or more. However, mostly immature males were available in these studies, with few adults to constrain the upper portion of the growth curves.

The largest total length for the species is uncertain due to a lack of detailed documentation of the largest reported individuals. Whale sharks as large as 18 to 20 metres (59 to 66 ft) in length have been reported in scientific literature. Most whale sharks observed are smaller.

Large whale sharks are difficult to measure accurately, both on the land and in the water. When on land, the total length measurement can be affected by how the tail is positioned, either angled as it would be in life or stretched as far as possible. Historically, techniques such as comparisons to objects of known size and knotted ropes have been used for in-water measurements, but these techniques may be inaccurate. Various forms of photogrammetry have been used to improve the accuracy of in-water measurements, including underwater and aerial techniques.

=== Reports of large whale sharks ===
Since the 1800s, there have been accounts of very large whale sharks. Some of these are as follows:

In 1868, the Irish natural scientist Edward Perceval Wright obtained several small whale shark specimens in the Seychelles. Wright was informed of one whale shark that was measured as exceeding 45 ft (14 m). Wright claimed to have observed specimens over 50 ft (15 m) and was told of specimens upwards of 70 ft (21 m).

Hugh M. Smith described a huge animal caught in a bamboo fish trap in Thailand in 1919. The shark was too heavy to pull ashore, and no measurements were taken. Smith learned through independent sources that it was at least 10 wa. (Note: a Thai anthropic unit originally referred to the arm span.) Smith noted that one wa could be interpreted as either 2 m (6.6 ft) or the approximate average of 1.7 to 1.8 m (5.6–5.9 ft), based on the local fishermen. Later sources have stated this whale shark as approximately 18 m (59 ft), but the accuracy of the estimate has been questioned.

In 1934, a ship named the Maunganui came across a whale shark in the southern Pacific Ocean and rammed it. The shark became stuck on the prow of the ship, supposedly with 15 ft (4.6 m) on one side and 40 ft (12.2 m) on the other, suggesting a total length of about 55 ft (17 m).

Scott A. Eckert & Brent S. Stewart reported on satellite tracking of whale sharks from 1994 to 1996. Out of the 15 individuals tracked, two females were reported as measuring 15 m (49 ft) and 18 m (59 ft). A 20.75 m (68.1 ft) long whale shark was reported as being stranded along the Ratnagiri coast in 1995. A female individual with a standard length of 15 m (49.2 ft) and an estimated total length at 18.8 m (61.7 ft) was reported from the Arabian Sea in 2001. In a 2015 study reviewing the size of marine megafauna, McClain and colleagues considered this female as being the most reliable and accurately measured.

On 7 February 2012, a large whale shark was found floating 150 kilometres (93 mi) off the coast of Karachi, Pakistan. The length of the specimen was said to be between 11 and 12 m (36 and 39 ft), with a weight of around 15,000 kg (33,000 lb).

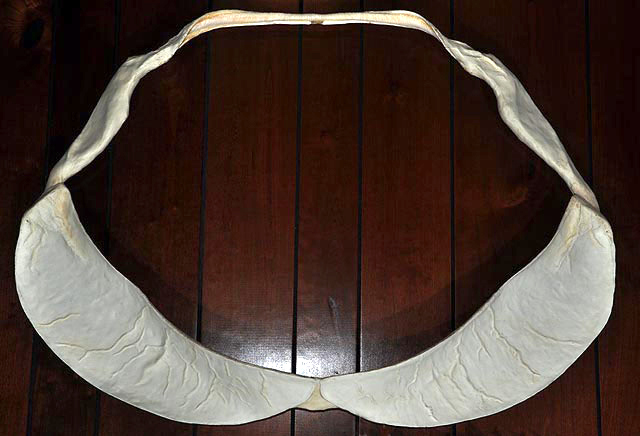
Jaws

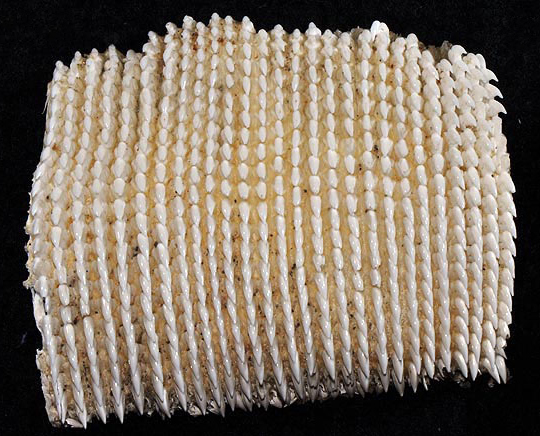
Teeth

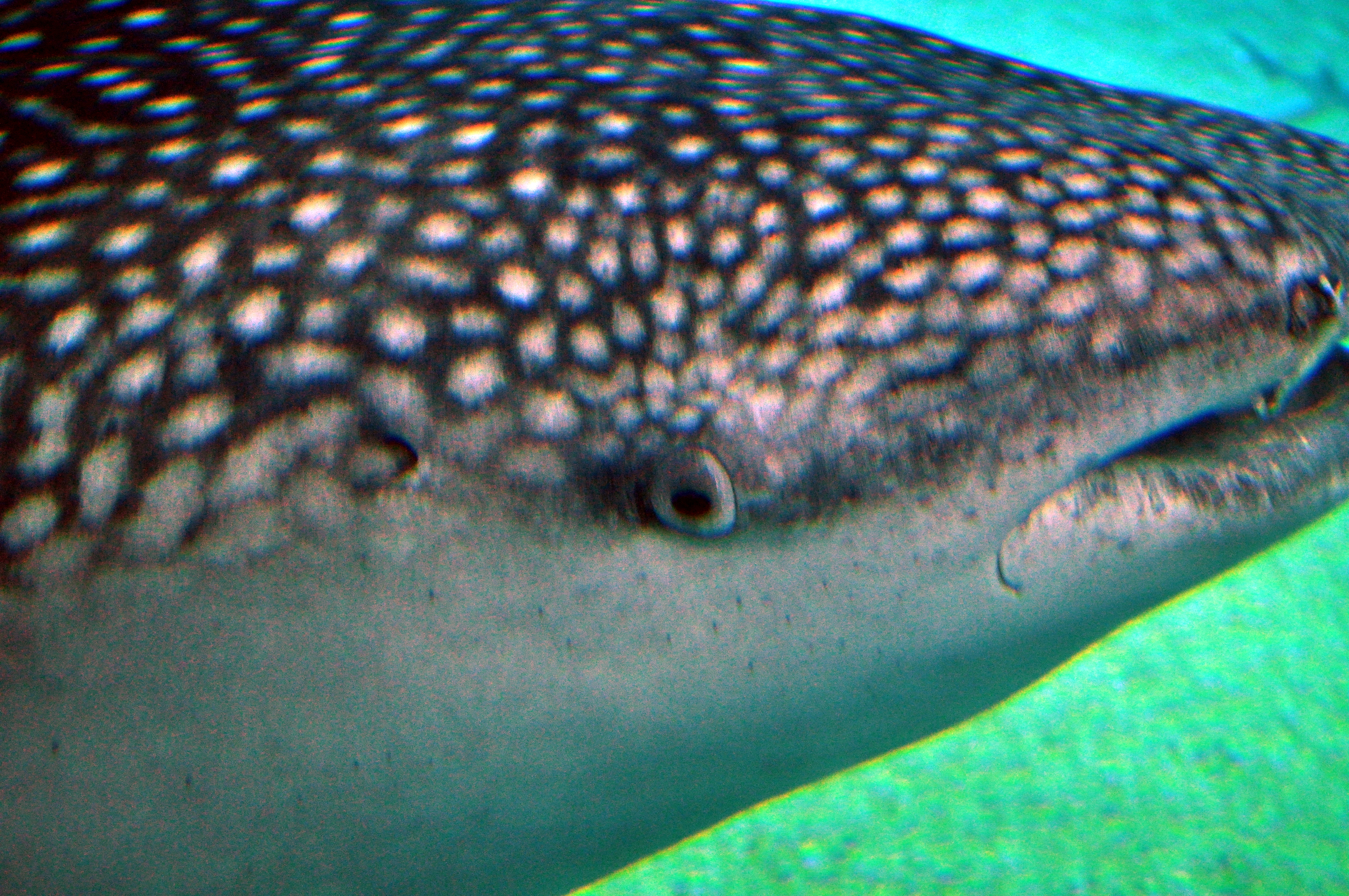
Eye

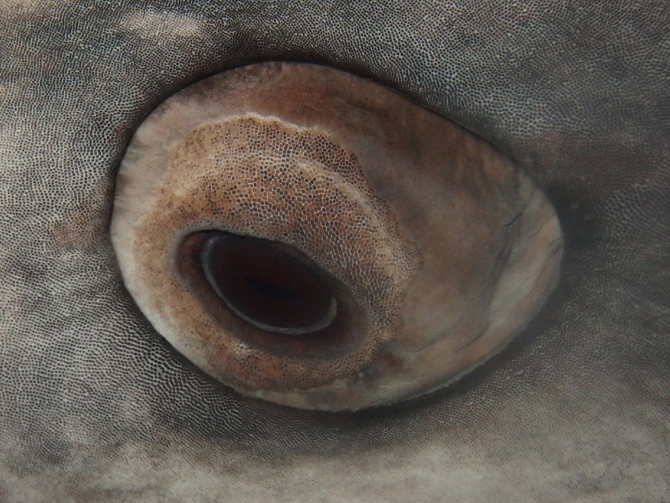
Close up showing eyeball denticles

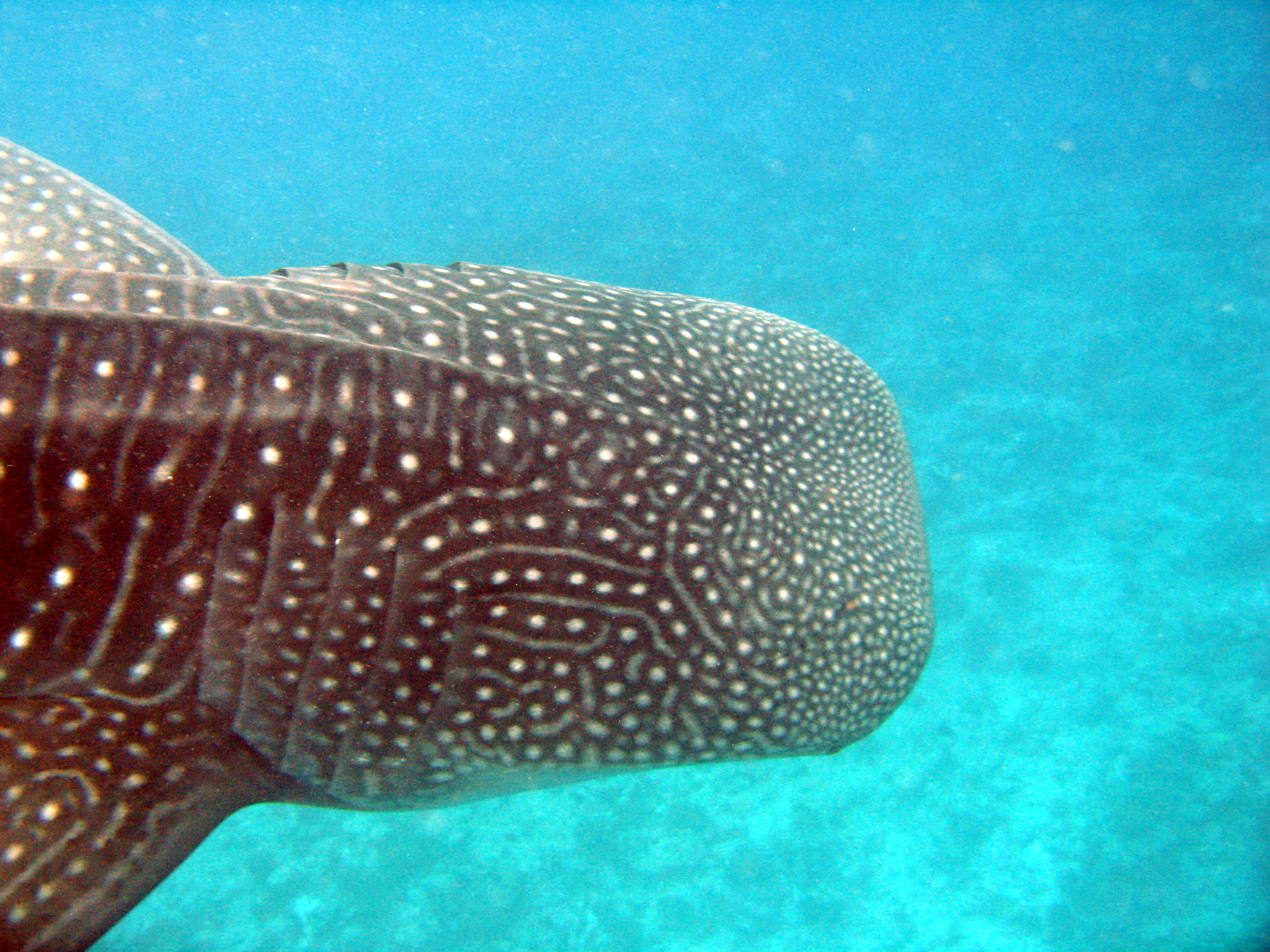
Top of head

== Distribution and habitat ==
The whale shark inhabits all tropical and warm-temperate seas. The fish is primarily pelagic, and can be found in both coastal and oceanic habitats. Tracking devices have shown that the whale shark displays dynamic patterns of habitat utilization, likely in response to availability of prey. Whale sharks observed off the northeast Yucatan Peninsula tend to engage in inshore surface swimming between sunrise and mid-afternoon, followed by regular vertical oscillations in oceanic waters during the afternoon and overnight. About 95% of the oscillating period was spent in epipelagic depths (<200 metres (660 ft)), but whale sharks also took regular deep dives (>500 metres (1,600 ft)), often descending in brief "stutter steps", perhaps for foraging. The deepest recorded dive was 1,928 metres (6,325 ft). Whale sharks were observed to remain continuously at depths of greater than 50 metres (160 ft) for three days or more.

The whale shark is migratory and has two distinct subpopulations: an Atlantic subpopulation, from Maine and the Azores to Cape Agulhas, South Africa, and an Indo-Pacific subpopulation which holds 75% of the entire whale shark population. It usually roams between 30°N and 35°S where water temperatures are higher than 21 °C (70 °F) but have been spotted as far north as the Bay of Fundy, Canada and the Sea of Okhotsk north of Japan and as far south as Victoria, Australia.

Seasonal feeding aggregations occur at several coastal sites such as the Persian Gulf and Gulf of Oman, Ningaloo Reef in Western Australia, Darwin Island in the Galápagos, Quintana Roo in Mexico, Mafia Island of Pwani Region in Tanzania, Inhambane province in Mozambique, the Philippines, around Mahe in the Seychelles, the Gujarat and Kerala coasts of India, Taiwan, southern China and Qatar.

In 2009, more than 400 whale sharks gathered off the Yucatan Coast. It was one of the largest gatherings of whale sharks recorded. Aggregations in that area are among the most reliable seasonal gatherings known for whale sharks, with large numbers occurring in most years between May and September. Whale sharks remain in this feeding area for an average of 24–33 days, but some individuals stay for as long as six months. Associated ecotourism has grown rapidly to unsustainable levels.

== Growth and reproduction ==
Growth, longevity, and reproduction of the whale shark are poorly understood.

Vertebral growth bands have been used to estimate the age, growth, and longevity of whale sharks. However, there was uncertainty as to whether vertebrae growth bands are formed annually or biannually. A 2020 study compared the ratio of Carbon-14 isotopes found in growth bands of whale shark vertebrae to nuclear testing events in the 1950–60s, finding that growth bands are laid down annually. The study found an age of 50 years for a 10 m (33 ft) female and 35 years for a 9.9 m (32 ft) male. Various studies looking at vertebrae growth bands and measuring whale sharks in the wild have estimated their lifespans from ~80 years and up to ~130 years.

Evidence suggests that males grow faster than females in the earlier stages of life but ultimately reach a smaller maximum size. Whale sharks exhibit late sexual maturity. One study looking at free-swimming whale sharks estimated the age at maturity in males at ~25 years.

Pupping of whale sharks has not been observed, but mating has been witnessed twice in St Helena. Mating in this species was filmed for the first time in whale sharks off Ningaloo Reef via airplane in Australia in 2019, when a larger male unsuccessfully attempted to mate with a smaller, immature female.

The capture of a ~10.6 m (35 ft) female in July 1996 that was pregnant with ~300 pups indicated that whale sharks are ovoviviparous. The eggs remain in the body and the females give birth to live young which are 40 to 60 cm (16 to 24 in) long. Evidence indicates the pups are not all born at once, but rather the female retains sperm from one mating and produces a steady stream of pups over a prolonged period.

On 7 March 2009, marine scientists in the Philippines discovered what is believed to be the smallest living specimen of the whale shark. The young shark, measuring only 38 cm (15 in), was found with its tail tied to a stake at a beach in Pilar, Sorsogon, Philippines, and was released into the wild. Based on this discovery, some scientists no longer believe this area is just a feeding ground; this site may be a birthing ground, as well. Both young whale sharks and pregnant females have been seen in the waters of St Helena in the South Atlantic Ocean, where numerous whale sharks can be spotted during the summer.

In a report from Rappler last August 2019, whale sharks were sighted during WWF Philippines' photo identification activities in the first half of the year. There were a total 168 sightings – 64 of them "re-sightings" or reappearances of previously recorded whale sharks. WWF noted that "very young whale shark juveniles" were identified among the 168 individuals spotted in the first half of 2019. Their presence suggests that the Ticao Pass may be a pupping ground for whale sharks, further increasing the ecological significance of the area.

Large adult females, often pregnant, are a seasonal presence around the Galapagos Islands, which may have reproductive significance. One study between 2011 and 2013 found that 91.5% of the whale sharks observed around Darwin Island were adult females.

In an article by Hueter published in 2013, a whale shark nicknamed 'Rio lady' performed a 7,772 km migration in 150 days while pregnant. This migration started from the Yucatan Peninsula to the Mid-Atlantic Ridge. She did regular deep dives up to 1,600 meters down throughout her entire trip as shown with vertical data. The researchers hypothesized that this migration was for reproductive purposes and that she was going to a pupping ground in the open Atlantic.

== Diet ==
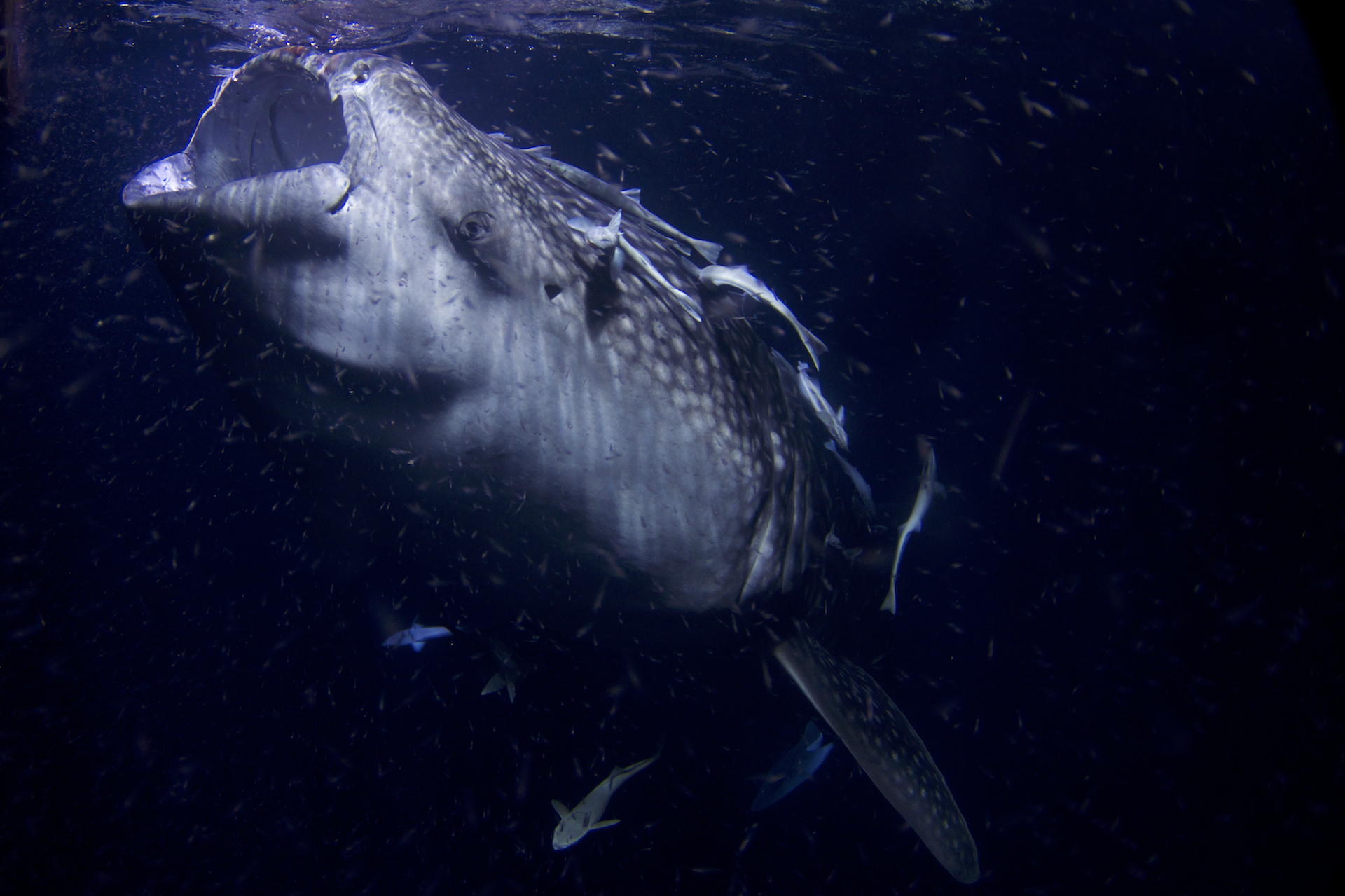
Whale shark filtering plankton in Maldives

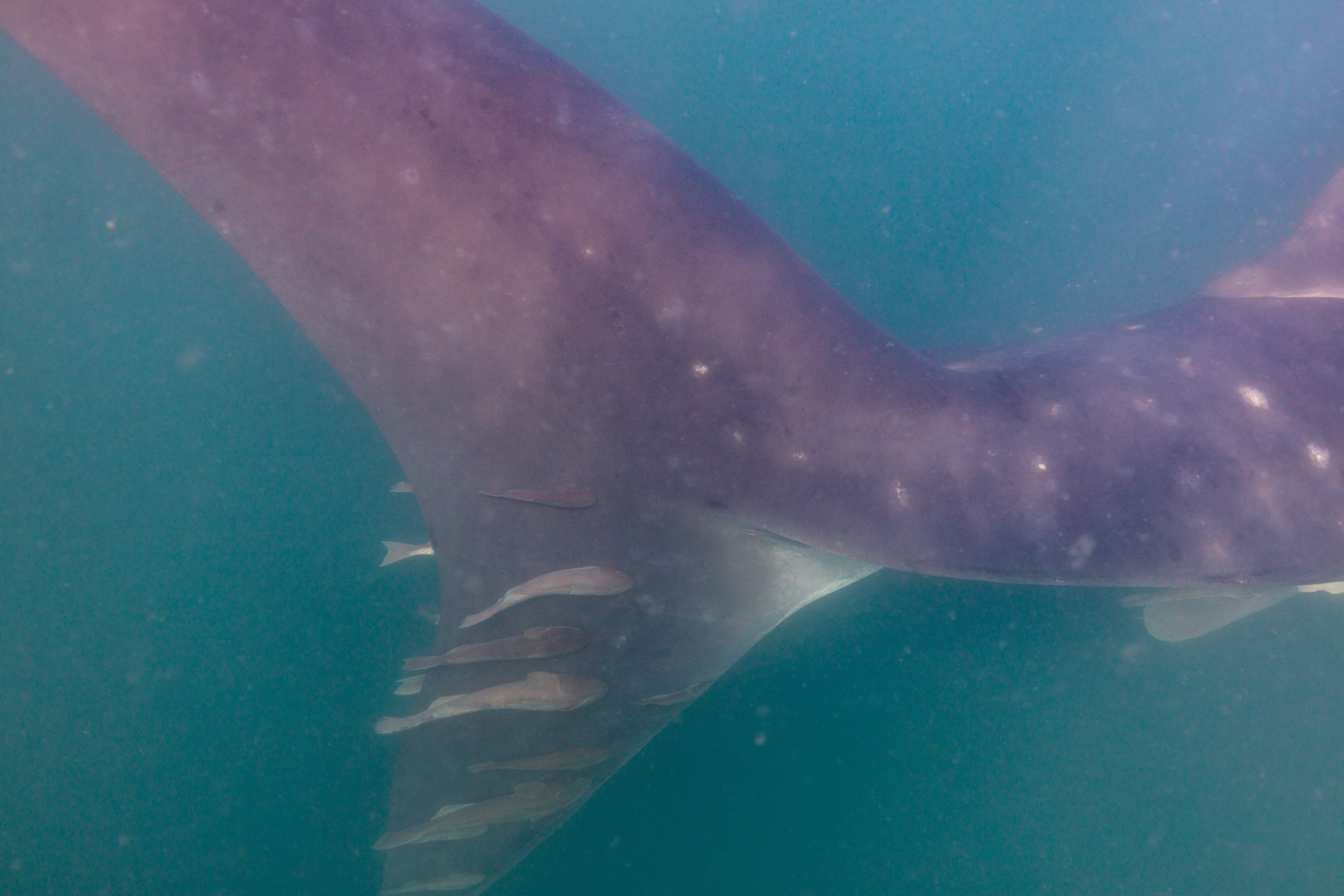
A whale shark in Mexico with remoras

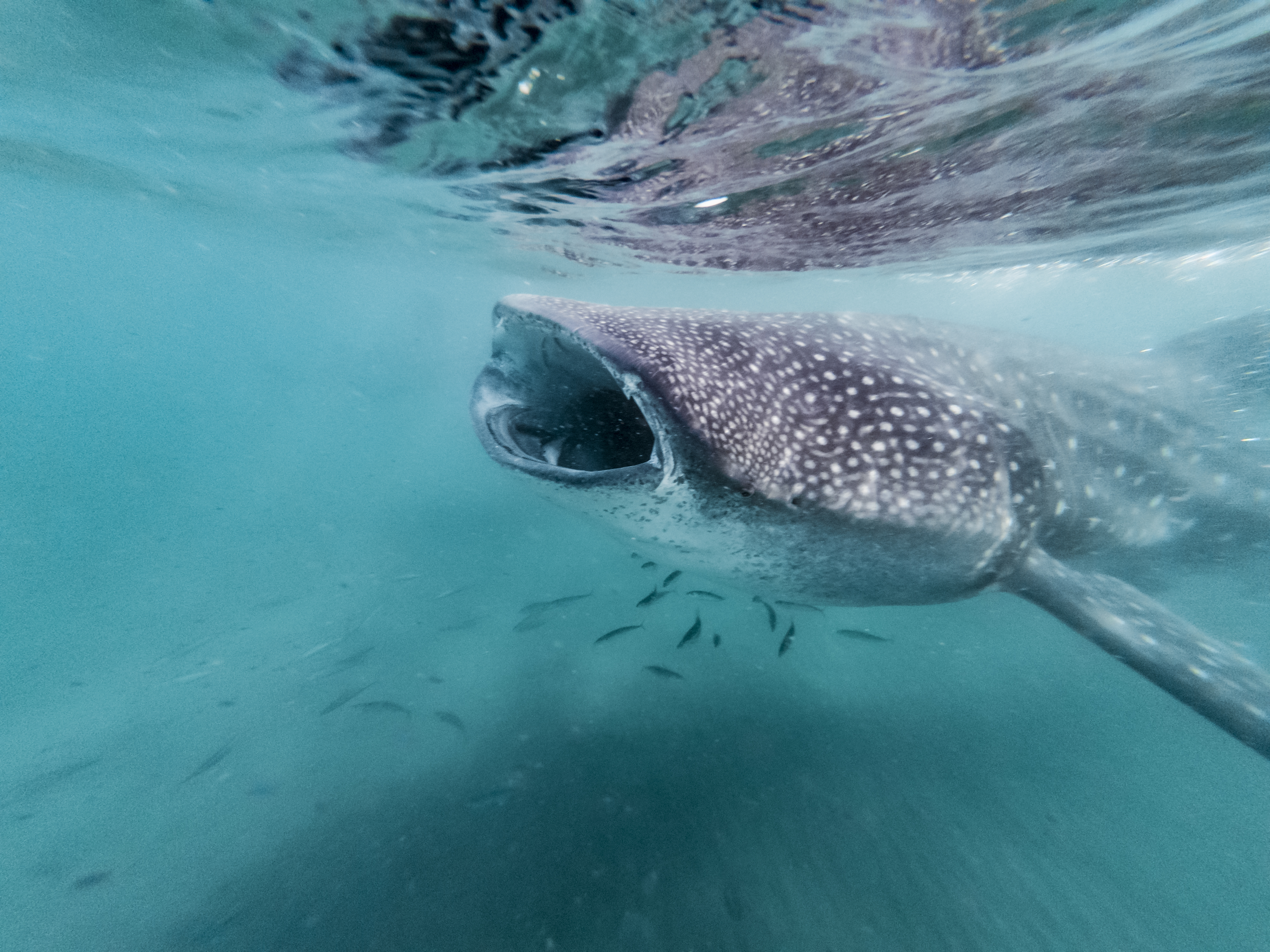
Whale shark with open mouth feeding in La Paz, Baja California Sur, Mexico

The whale shark is a filter feeder – one of only three known filter-feeding shark species (along with the basking shark and the megamouth shark). It feeds on plankton including copepods, krill, chaetognaths, jellyfish, fish eggs, Christmas Island red crab larvae and small nektonic life, such as small squid or fish (sardines, anchovies, mackerels and small tunas). It also feeds on clouds of eggs during mass spawning of fish and corals. In addition, they have been found to ingest and partially digest Sargassum, thus making them omnivores. The many rows of vestigial teeth play no role in feeding. Feeding occurs either by ram filtration, in which the animal opens its mouth and swims forward, pushing water and food into the mouth, or by active suction feeding, in which the animal opens and closes its mouth, sucking in volumes of water that are then expelled through the gills. In both cases, the filter pads serve to separate food from water. These unique, black sieve-like structures are presumed to be modified gill rakers. Food separation in whale sharks is by cross-flow filtration, in which the water travels nearly parallel to the filter pad surface, not perpendicularly through it, before passing to the outside, while denser food particles continue to the back of the throat. This is an extremely efficient filtration method that minimizes fouling of the filter pad surface. Whale sharks have been observed "coughing", presumably to clear a build-up of particles from the filter pads. Whale sharks migrate to feed and possibly to breed.

The whale shark is an active feeder, targeting concentrations of plankton or fish. It is able to ram filter feed or can gulp in a stationary position. This is in contrast to the passive feeding basking shark, which does not pump water. Instead, it swims to force water across its gills.

A juvenile whale shark is estimated to eat 21 kg (46 pounds) of plankton per day.

The BBC program Planet Earth filmed a whale shark feeding on a school of small fish. The same documentary showed footage of a whale shark timing its arrival to coincide with the mass spawning of fish shoals and feeding on the resultant clouds of eggs and sperm.

Due to their mode of feeding, whale sharks are susceptible to the ingestion of microplastics. As such, the presence of microplastics in whale shark scat was recently confirmed.

== Predators ==
Whale sharks have few natural predators, but young, sick, or injured whale sharks can be hunted by a few species. Orcas have been observed working together to flip over whale sharks to eat their nutrient-rich livers. Large sharks such as tiger sharks, blue sharks, and great white sharks occasionally target weaker whale sharks. Blue marlin may also prey on very young whale sharks.

== Relationship with humans ==
=== Behavior toward divers ===
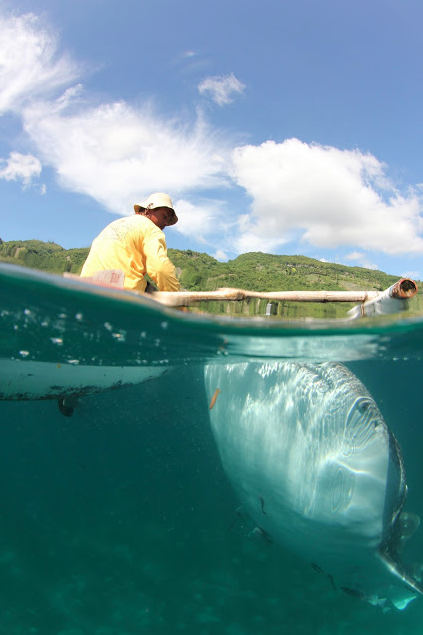
In Oslob, Philippines, whale sharks are fed shrimp to return every morning for tourists and divers.

Despite their great size, whale sharks pose no danger to humans. Younger whale sharks are gentle and can play with divers. Underwater photographers such as Fiona Ayerst have photographed them swimming close to humans without any danger. Although whale sharks are docile fish, touching or riding the sharks is strictly forbidden and fineable in most countries, as it can cause them serious harm.

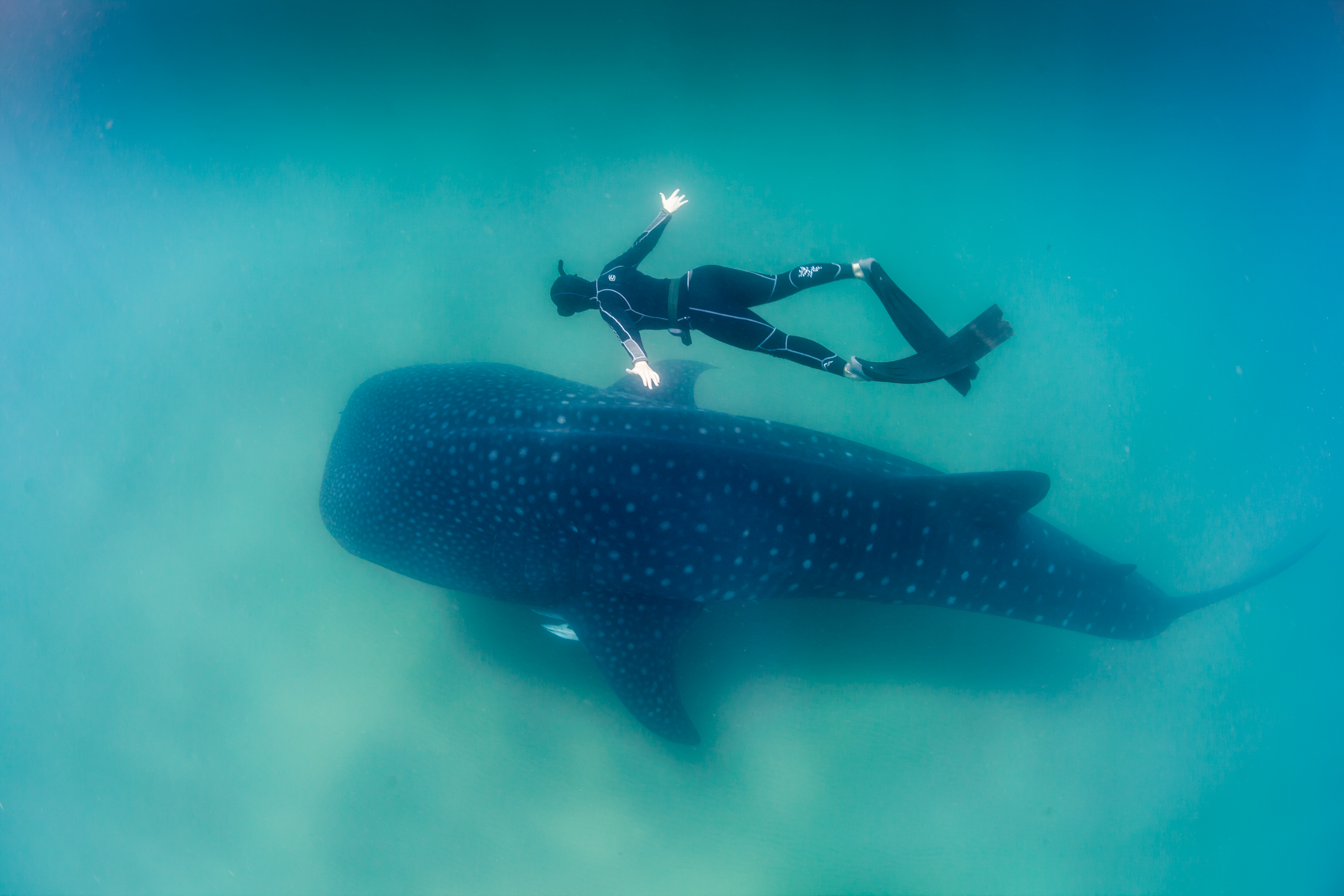
Swimming alongside an adult free diver

Divers regularly encounter whale sharks in the Bay Islands in Honduras, Thailand, Indonesia (Bone Bolango, Cendrawasih Bay), the Philippines, the Maldives close to Maamigili (South Ari Atoll), the Red Sea, Western Australia (Ningaloo Reef, Christmas Island), Taiwan, Panama (Coiba Island), Belize, Tofo Beach in Mozambique, Sodwana Bay (Greater St. Lucia Wetland Park) in South Africa, the Galapagos Islands, Saint Helena, Isla Mujeres (Caribbean Sea), La Paz, Baja California Sur and Bahía de los Ángeles in Mexico, the Seychelles, West Malaysia, islands off eastern peninsular Malaysia, India, Sri Lanka, off the coast of Iran's Qeshm and Hengam islands in Persian gulf, Oman, Fujairah, Puerto Rico, and other parts of the Caribbean. Juveniles can be found near the shore in the Gulf of Tadjoura, near Djibouti, in the Horn of Africa.

=== Conservation status ===
Estimating the exact number of whale sharks globally is challenging due to their migratory nature and the vastness of their habitat. Current estimates suggest that approximately 130,000 to 200,000 whale sharks inhabit the world's oceans. These numbers are declining. Over the past 75 years, the global whale shark population has decreased by about 50%, with declines of approximately 63% in the Indian and Pacific Oceans and over 30% in the Atlantic Ocean. This decline is attributed to threats such as fishing bycatch, vessel strikes, and pollution. Consequently, the International Union for Conservation of Nature (IUCN) has listed the whale shark as an endangered species. In June 2018 the New Zealand Department of Conservation classified the whale shark as "Migrant" with the qualifier "Secure Overseas" under the New Zealand Threat Classification System.

It is listed, along with six other species of sharks, under the CMS Memorandum of Understanding on the Conservation of Migratory Sharks. In 1998, the Philippines banned all fishing, selling, importing, and exporting of whale sharks for commercial purposes, followed by India in May 2001 and Taiwan in May 2007.

In 2010, the Gulf of Mexico oil spill resulted in 4,900,000 barrels (780,000 m^{3}) of oil flowing into an area south of the Mississippi River Delta, where one-third of all whale shark sightings in the northern part of the gulf have occurred in recent years. Sightings confirmed that the whale sharks were unable to avoid the oil slick, which was situated on the surface of the sea where the whale sharks feed for several hours at a time. No dead whale sharks were found.

The species was added to Appendix II of the Convention on International Trade in Endangered Species of Wild Fauna and Flora (CITES) in 2003 to regulate the international trade of live specimens and its parts.

It was reported in 2014 that hundreds of whale sharks were illegally killed every year in China for their fins, skins, and oil.

Propeller scarring has become a widespread issue. A report in 2006 showed that 65% of whale sharks in the Arta Bay region of the Gulf of Tadjora, Djibouti, showed injury. These injuries occur as the frequently cross national maritime boundaries due to their highly migratory nature.

=== In captivity ===
A whale shark in the Georgia Aquarium

The whale shark is popular in the few public aquariums that keep it, but its large size means that a very large tank is required and it has specialized feeding requirements. Their large size and iconic status have fueled an opposition to keeping the species in captivity, especially after the early death of some whale sharks in captivity and certain aquariums keeping the species in relatively small tanks.

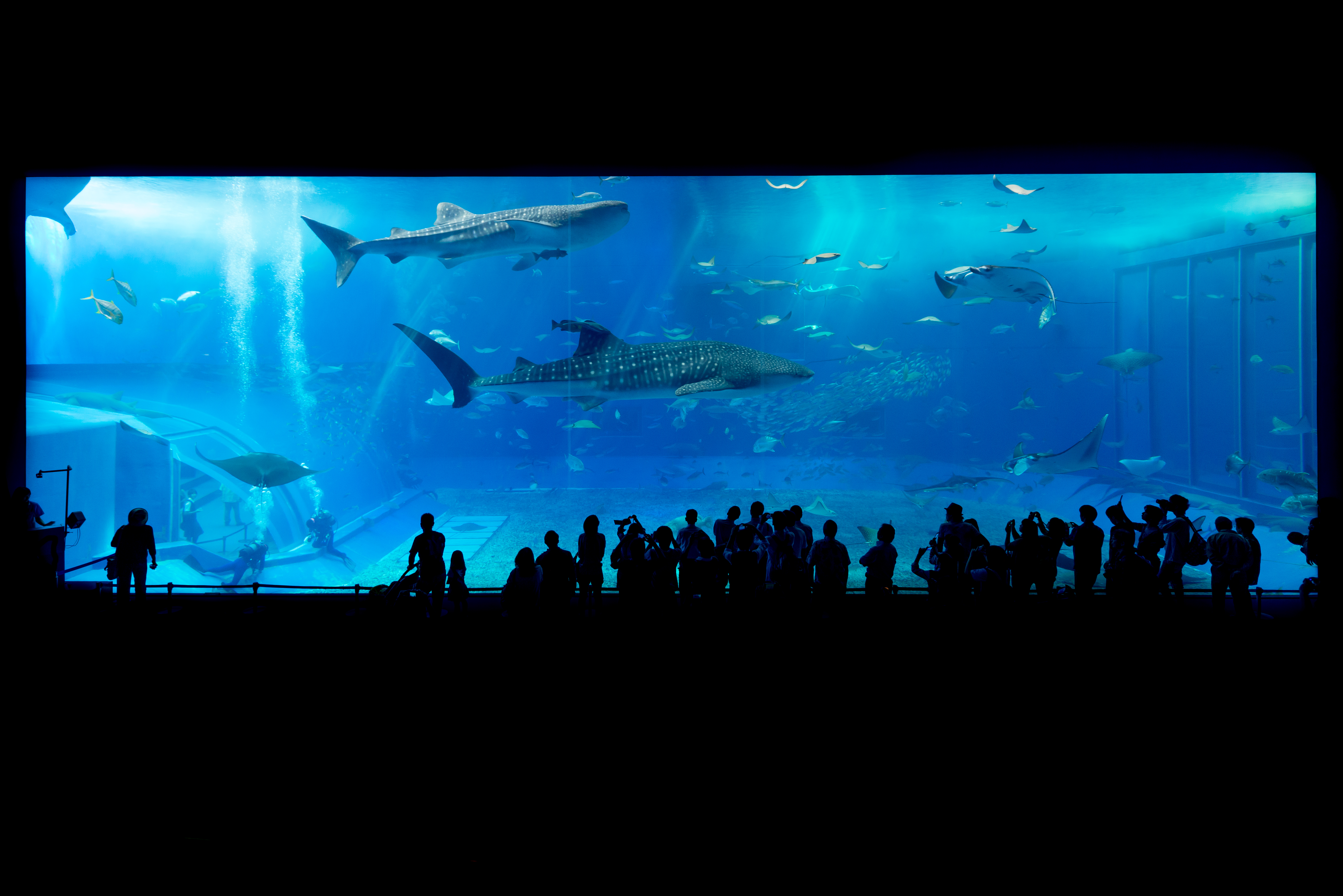
Whale sharks at the Okinawa Churaumi Aquarium, Japan

The first attempt at keeping whale sharks in captivity was in 1934 when an individual was kept for about four months in a netted-off natural bay in Izu, Japan. The first attempt of keeping whale sharks in an aquarium was initiated in 1980 by the Okinawa Churaumi Aquarium (then known as Okinawa Ocean Expo Aquarium) in Japan. Since 1980, several have been kept at Okinawa, mostly obtained from incidental catches in coastal nets set by fishers (none after 2009), but two were strandings. Several of these were already weak from the capture/stranding and some were released, but initial captive survival rates were low. After the initial difficulties in maintaining the species had been resolved, some have survived long-term in captivity. The record for a whale shark in captivity is an individual that, as of 2021, has lived for more than 26 years in the Okinawa Churaumi Aquarium from Okinawa Ocean Expo Aquarium. Following Okinawa, Osaka Aquarium started keeping whale sharks and most of the basic research on the keeping of the species was made at these two institutions.

Since the mid-1990s, several other aquariums have kept the species in Japan (Kagoshima Aquarium, Kinosaki Marine World, Notojima Aquarium, Oita Marine Palace Aquarium, and Yokohama Hakkeijima Sea Paradise), South Korea (Aqua Planet Jeju), China (Chimelong Ocean Kingdom, Dalian Aquarium, Guangzhou Aquarium in Guangzhou Zoo, Qingdao Polar Ocean World and Yantai Aquarium), Taiwan (National Museum of Marine Biology and Aquarium), India (Thiruvananthapuram Aquarium) and Dubai (Atlantis, The Palm), with some maintaining whale sharks for years and others only for a very short period. The whale shark kept at Dubai's Atlantis, The Palm was rescued from shallow waters in 2008 with extensive abrasions to the fins and after rehabilitation it was released in 2010, having lived 19 months in captivity. Marine Life Park in Singapore had planned on keeping whale sharks but scrapped this idea in 2009.

Outside Asia, the first and so far only place to keep whale sharks is Georgia Aquarium in Atlanta, United States. This is unusual because of the comparatively long transport time and complex logistics required to bring the sharks to the aquarium, ranging between 28 and 36 hours. As of August 2025, Georgia keeps one whale shark, a male named Yushan, who arrived in 2007. Two earlier males at Georgia Aquarium, Ralph and Norton, both died in 2007. Trixie died in 2020. Alice died in 2021. Taroko died in 2025. Georgia's whale sharks were all imported from Taiwan and were taken from the commercial fishing quota for the species, usually used locally for food. Taiwan closed this fishery entirely in 2008.

=== Human culture ===
Snorkeling with whale shark near Isla Mujeres (Mexico) 30 August 2011

In Madagascar, whale sharks are called marokintana in Malagasy, meaning "many stars", after the appearance of the markings on the shark's back.

In the Philippines, it is called butanding and balilan. The whale shark is featured on the reverse of the Philippine 100-peso bill. By law snorkelers must maintain a distance of 4 ft (1.2 m) from the sharks and there is a fine and possible prison sentence for anyone who touches the animals.

Whale sharks are known as jinbei-zame in Japan (because the markings resemble patterns typically seen on jinbei). In Indonesia, it is known as gurano bintang (roughly "star from the East") in the Sulawesi and the Papua region, and also gêgêr lintang (meaning "star-backed") in Eastern Java. It is known as ca ong (literally "sir fish") in Vietnam.

The whale shark is featured on the latest 2015–2017 edition of the Maldivian 1000 rufiyaa banknote, along with the green turtle.

== Whale shark experts ==
- Simon J Pierce
- MarAlliance

== See also ==
- List of sharks
- List of threatened sharks
- Outline of sharks
