= Inhambane Airport =

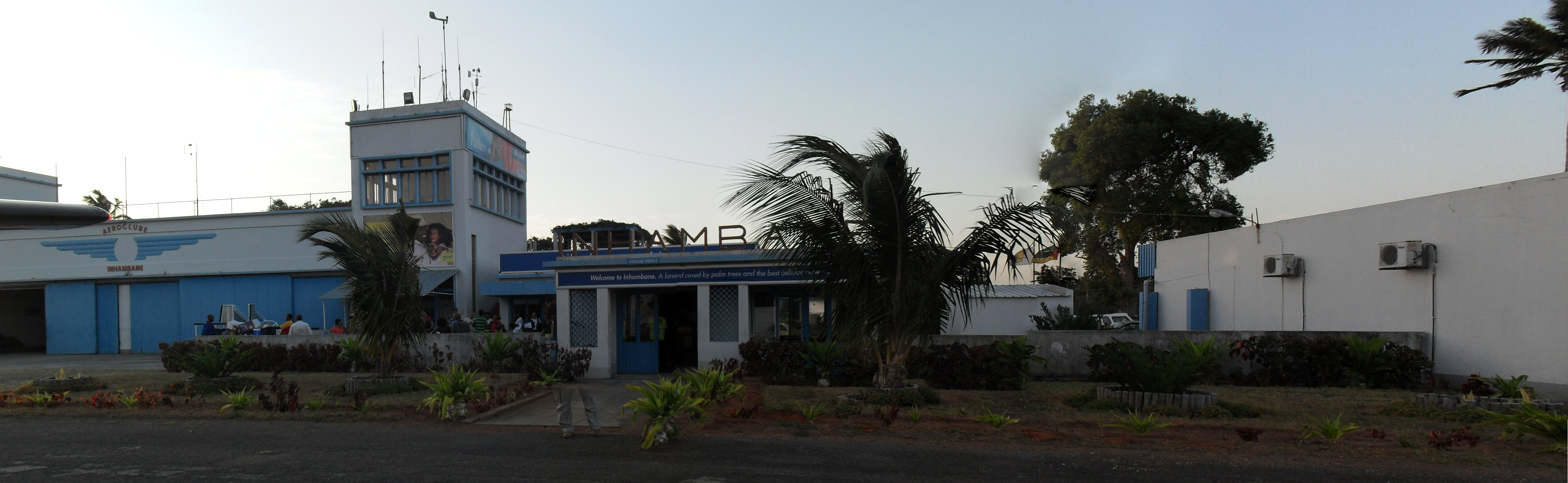
- IATA: INH; ICAO: FQIN

Summary
- Airport type: Public
- Operator: Aeroportos de Mocambique (Mozambique Airports Company)
- Serves: Inhambane
- Location: Inhambane, Mozambique
- Elevation AMSL: 30 ft / 9 m
- Coordinates: 23°52′35.15″S 35°24′30.76″E

Map
- Location of airport in Mozambique

Runways
Direction	Length		Surface
Direction	ft	m	Surface
06/24	2,625	800	Sand
16/34	4,921	1,500	Asphalt
- Source: WAD

Inhambane Airport is an airport in Jangamo District, Inhambane Province, Mozambique (IATA: INH, ICAO: FQIN).

== Airlines and destinations ==
Airlines	Destinations
LAM Mozambique Airlines	Maputo, Vilanculos

== See also ==
- Inhambane
- Tofo
