= May 2008 South Africa riots =

Anti-immigration riots in South Africa

2008 South Africa riots
- Part of the Xenophobia in South Africa
- Map of South Africa
Date	12 May 2008
Location	Gauteng, Durban, Mpumalanga; South Africa
Result	62 people dead, several hundred injured, voluntary deportation of immigrants to home countries, destruction of immigrant-owned property

The May 2008 South African riots was a wave of xenophobic riots starting in Alexandra, Gauteng (a neighborhood of Johannesburg) on 12 May 2008 and then spreading to other locations across South Africa. The violence started when South African residents of Alexandra attacked migrants from Mozambique, Malawi and Zimbabwe, killing two people and injuring 40 others. Some attackers were reported to have been singing Jacob Zuma's campaign song Umshini Wami (Zulu: "Bring Me My Machine Gun").

In the following weeks the violence spread, first to other settlements in the Gauteng Province, then to the coastal cities of Durban and Cape Town. Attacks were also reported in parts of the Western Cape, Mpumalanga, the North West and Free State.

== Popular opposition to xenophobia ==
In Khutsong in Gauteng and the various shack settlements governed by Abahlali baseMjondolo in KwaZulu-Natal social movements were able to ensure that there were no violent attacks. The Western Cape Anti-Eviction Campaign also organised campaigns against xenophobia. Pallo Jordan argued that "Active grass-roots interventions contained the last wave of xenophobia".

== Causes ==
A report by the Human Sciences Research Council identified four broad causes for the violence:

- relative deprivation, specifically intense competition for jobs, commodities and housing;
- group processes, including psychological categorisation processes that are nationalistic rather than superordinate
- South African exceptionalism, or a feeling of superiority in relation to other Africans; and
- exclusive citizenship, or a form of nationalism that excludes others.

A subsequent report, "Towards Tolerance, Law and Dignity: Addressing Violence against Foreign Nationals in South Africa" commissioned by the International Organization for Migration found that poor service delivery or an influx of foreigners may have played a contributing role, but blamed township politics for the attacks. It also found that community leadership was potentially lucrative for unemployed people, and that such leaders organised the attacks. Local leadership could be illegitimate and often violent when emerging from either a political vacuum or fierce competition, the report said, and such leaders enhanced their authority by reinforcing resentment towards foreigners.

== Aftermath ==
1400 suspects were arrested in connection with the violence. Nine months after the attacks 128 individuals had been convicted and 30 found not guilty in 105 concluded court cases. 208 cases had been withdrawn and 156 were still being heard.

One year after the attacks prosecutors said that 137 people had been convicted, 182 cases had been withdrawn because witnesses or complainants had left the country, 51 cases were underway or ready for trial and 82 had been referred for further investigation.

In May 2009, one year after the attacks the Consortium for Refugees and Migrants in South Africa (Cormsa) said that foreigners remained under threat of violence and that little had been done to address the causes of the attacks. The organisation complained of a lack of accountability for those responsible for public violence, insufficient investigations into the instigators and the lack of a public government inquiry.

=== Refugee camps and reintegration question ===
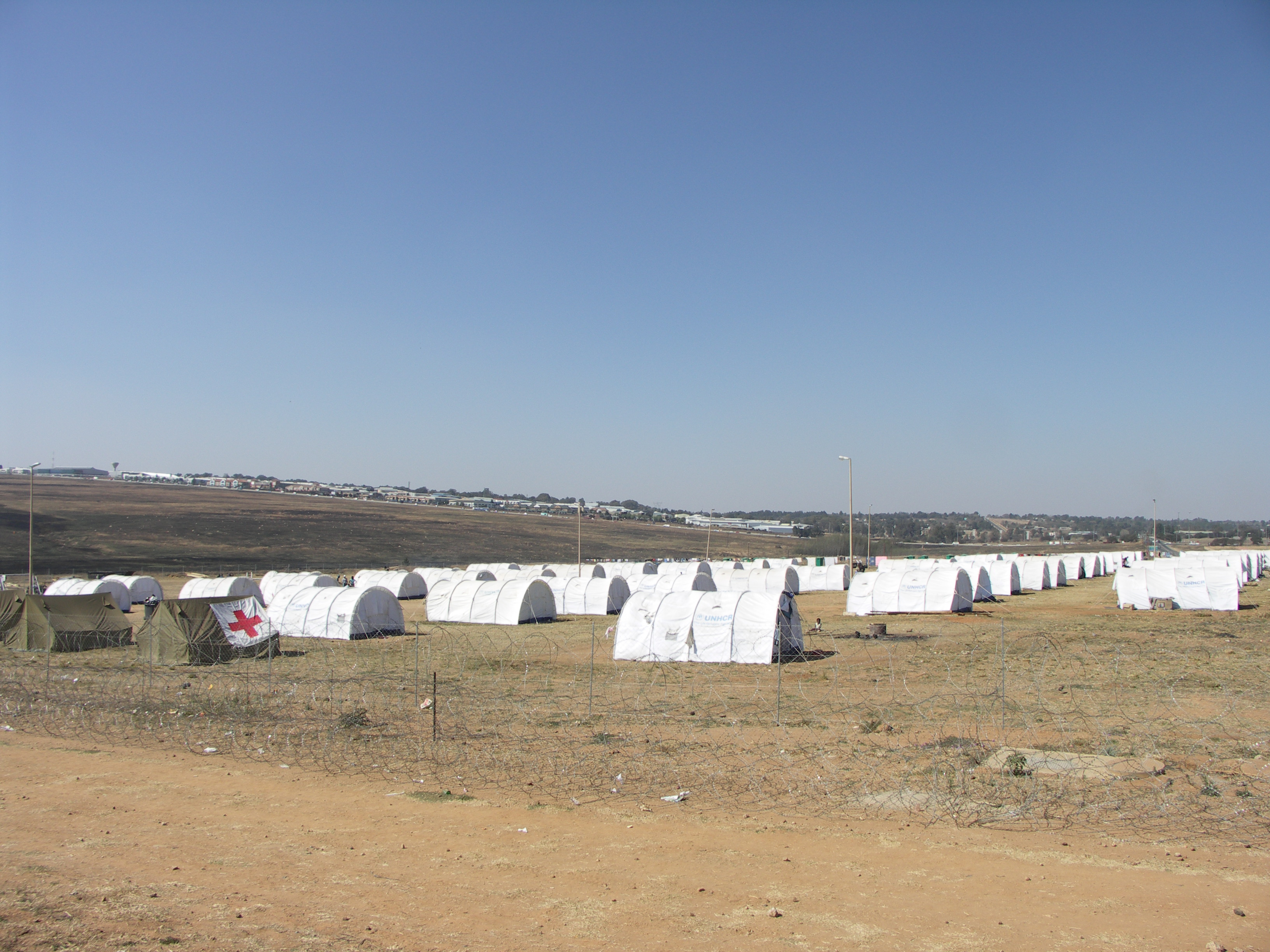
UNHCR tents at a refugee camp on Olifantsfontein, Midrand, Johannesburg

After being housed in temporary places of safety (including police stations and community halls) for three weeks, those who fled the violence were moved into specially established temporary camps. Conditions in some camps were condemned on the grounds of location and infrastructure, highlighting their temporary nature.

The South African government initially adopted a policy of quickly reintegrating refugees into the communities they originally fled and subsequently set a deadline in July 2008, by which time refugees would be expected to return to their communities or countries of origin. After an apparent policy shift the government vowed that there would be no forced reintegration of refugees and that the victims would not be deported, even if they were found to be illegal immigrants.

In May 2009, one year after the attacks, the City of Cape Town said it would apply for an eviction order to force 461 remaining refugees to leave two refugee camps in that city.

== Domestic political reaction ==
On 21 May, then-President Thabo Mbeki approved a request from the SAPS for deployment of armed forces against the attacks in Gauteng. It was the first time that the South African government ordered troops out to the streets in order to quell unrest since the end of Apartheid in the early 1990s.

Several political parties blamed each other, and sometimes other influences, for the attacks. The Gauteng provincial branch of the African National Congress (ANC) alleged that the violence was politically motivated by a "third hand" that was primarily targeting the ANC for the 2009 general elections. Both the Minister of Intelligence, Ronnie Kasrils, and the director general of the National Intelligence Agency, Manala Manzini, backed the Gauteng ANC's allegations that the anti-immigrant violence is politically motivated and targeted at the ANC. Referring to published allegations by one rioter that he was being paid to commit violent acts against immigrants, Manzini said that the violence was being stoked primarily within hostel facilities by a third party with financial incentives.

Helen Zille, leader of the official opposition party the Democratic Alliance (DA), pointed to instances of crowds of rioters singing "Umshini wami", a song associated with then-president of the ANC Jacob Zuma, and noted that the rioters also hailed from the rank and file of the ANC Youth League. She alleged that Zuma had promised years before to his supporters to take measures against the immigration of foreign nationals to South Africa and that Zuma's most recent condemnation of the riots and distancing from the anti-immigration platform was not enough of a serious initiative against the participation of fellow party members in the violence. Both Zille and the parliamentary leader of the DA, Sandra Botha, slammed the ANC for shifting the blame concerning the violence to a "third hand", which is often taken in South African post-apartheid political discourse as a reference to pro-apartheid or allegedly pro-apartheid organisations.

Zuma, in turn, condemned both the attacks and the Mbeki government's response to the attacks; Zuma also lamented the usage of his trademark song "Umshini wami" by the rioters. Secretary-General Gwede Mantashe called for the creation of local committees to combat violence against foreigners.

Zille was also criticised by Finance Minister Trevor Manuel for being quoted in the Cape Argus as saying that foreigners were responsible for a bulk of the drug trade in South Africa.

In KwaZulu-Natal province, Bheki Cele, provincial community safety minister, blamed the Inkatha Freedom Party (IFP), a nationalist Zulu political party, for stoking and capitalising on the violence in Durban. Both Cele and premier S'bu Ndebele claimed that IFP members had attacked a tavern that catered to Nigerian immigrants en route to a party meeting. The IFP, which is based primarily in the predominantly ethnically-Zulu KwaZulu-Natal province, rejected the statements, and had, on 20 May, engaged in an anti-xenophobia meeting with the ANC.

Radical grassroots movements and organisations came out strongly against the 2008 xenophobic attacks calling them pogroms promoted by government and political parties. Some have claimed that local politicians and police have sanctioned the attacks. At the time, they also called for the closure of the Lindela Repatriation Centre which is seen as an example of the negative way the South African government treats African foreigners. Grassroots groups like Abahlali baseMjondolo and the South African Unemployed Peoples' Movement also opposed the latest round of xenophobic attacks in 2015.

== International reaction ==
The attacks were condemned by a wide variety of organisations and government leaders throughout Africa and the rest of the world. The Office of the United Nations High Commissioner for Refugees expressed concerns about the violence and urged the South African government to cease deportation of Zimbabwean nationals and also to allow the refugees and asylum seekers to regularise their stay in the country.

Malawi began repatriation of some of its nationals in South Africa. The Mozambican government sponsored a repatriation drive that saw the registration of at least 3 275 individuals. Individuals who returned to Mozambique included Sung Min Cho.
