= List of cities in Mozambique =

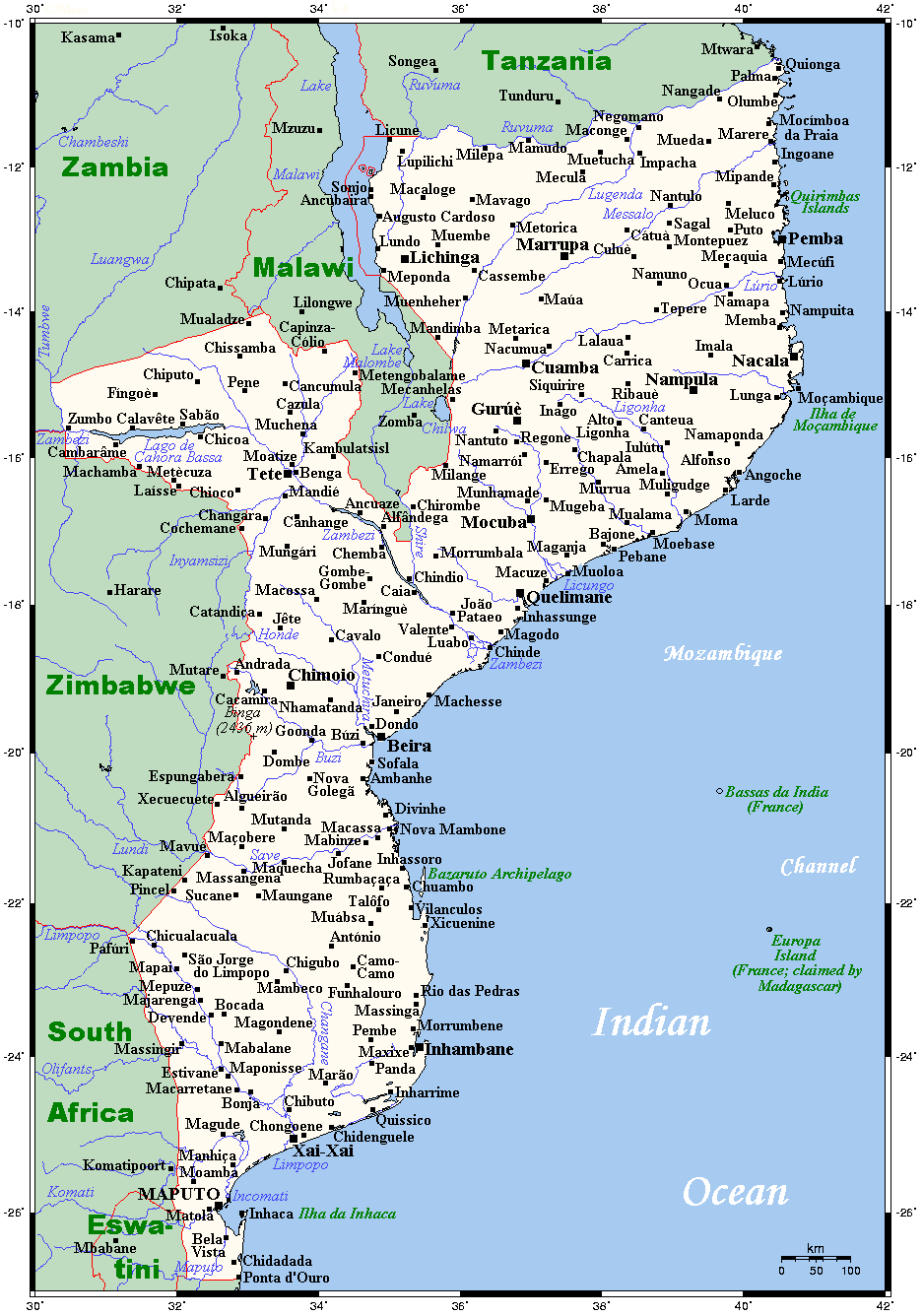
Map of Mozambique's cities, towns and selected villages

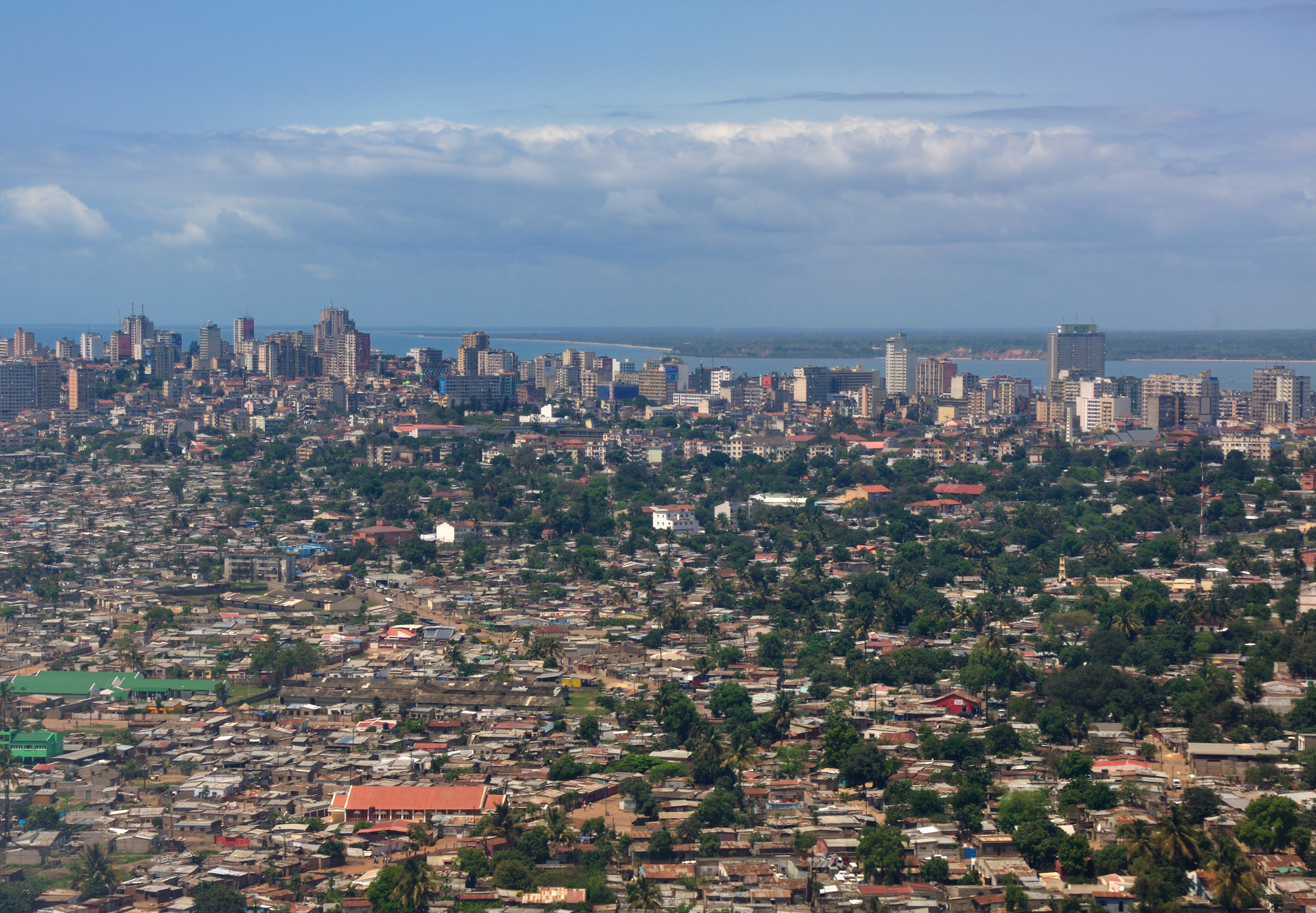
Maputo, capital of Mozambique

This is a list of cities and towns in Mozambique:

- Angoche
- Beira
- Catandica
- Chibuto
- Chicualacuala
- Chimoio
- Chinde
- Chokwé
- Cuamba
- Dondo
- Gurúè
- Inhambane
- Lichinga
- Manica
- Maputo (capital)
- Marracuene
- Matola
- Maxixe
- Moatize
- Moçambique
- Mocímboa da Praia
- Mocuba
- Montepuez
- Mueda
- Naamcha
- Nacala
- Nampula
- Palma
- Pemba
- Ponta d'Ouro
- Quelimane
- Tete
- Vilankulo
- Xai-Xai
- Zavala

== See also ==
- List of cities in Mozambique by population
