= Sung Min Cho =

Mozambican surfer (born 1999)

- Born: September 9, 1999 (age 27); Inhambane, Mozambique
- Occupation: Surfer

Sung Min Cho, also known by his nickname Mini Cho, is a Mozambican surfer. He is the first professional surfer from Mozambique and is the country director for Surfers Not Street Children and the coordinator of the Tofo Surf Club.

== Biography ==
Cho was born on September 9, 1999 in Inhambane, Mozambique to a Mozambican mother and a South Korean father. He has stated that he moved to South Africa when he was young and grew up in Johannesburg, but his family returned to Mozambique after the May 2008 South Africa riots. After he returned to Mozambique, he soon became interested in surfing, frequently watching tourists, but he was unable to afford the surfboard or lessons.

In 2014, when he was 14, he was gifted a surfboard by a tourist. He has stated that he started with no idea what he was doing and received no training, both due to money and due to the Mozambique surfing community being very small. However, the moment he got on the water, he was "immediately addicted".

Cho continued to grow as a surfer and has become Mozambique's first professional surfer, participating in several international competitions. He has served as the coordinator of the Tofo Surf Club, which focuses on supporting kids by teaching them surfing and other water-focused sports. In this capacity, he serves as the country's director for the nonprofit Surfers not Street Children.

Cho has competed four times in World Surf League qualifiers, including the Ballito Pro, the longest-running surfing program in Africa. After winning the Croyde Surf Club competition in the UK, he became the first Mozambican to win a surf contest in Europe. He led the Mozambique surf team in the 2025 African Games, where they placed second.

Cho has stated his goal is to qualify for the Olympics, and claims that surfing is an "escape from reality" for him. He also dreams of setting up a national surfing federation for Mozambique. He has voiced his support for the 2024–2025 Mozambican protests.

Cho is co-subject of the documentary Chasing the Unicorn, on surfing in Mozambique. The movie was rated favorably.
