= Maxixe, Mozambique =

Maxixe
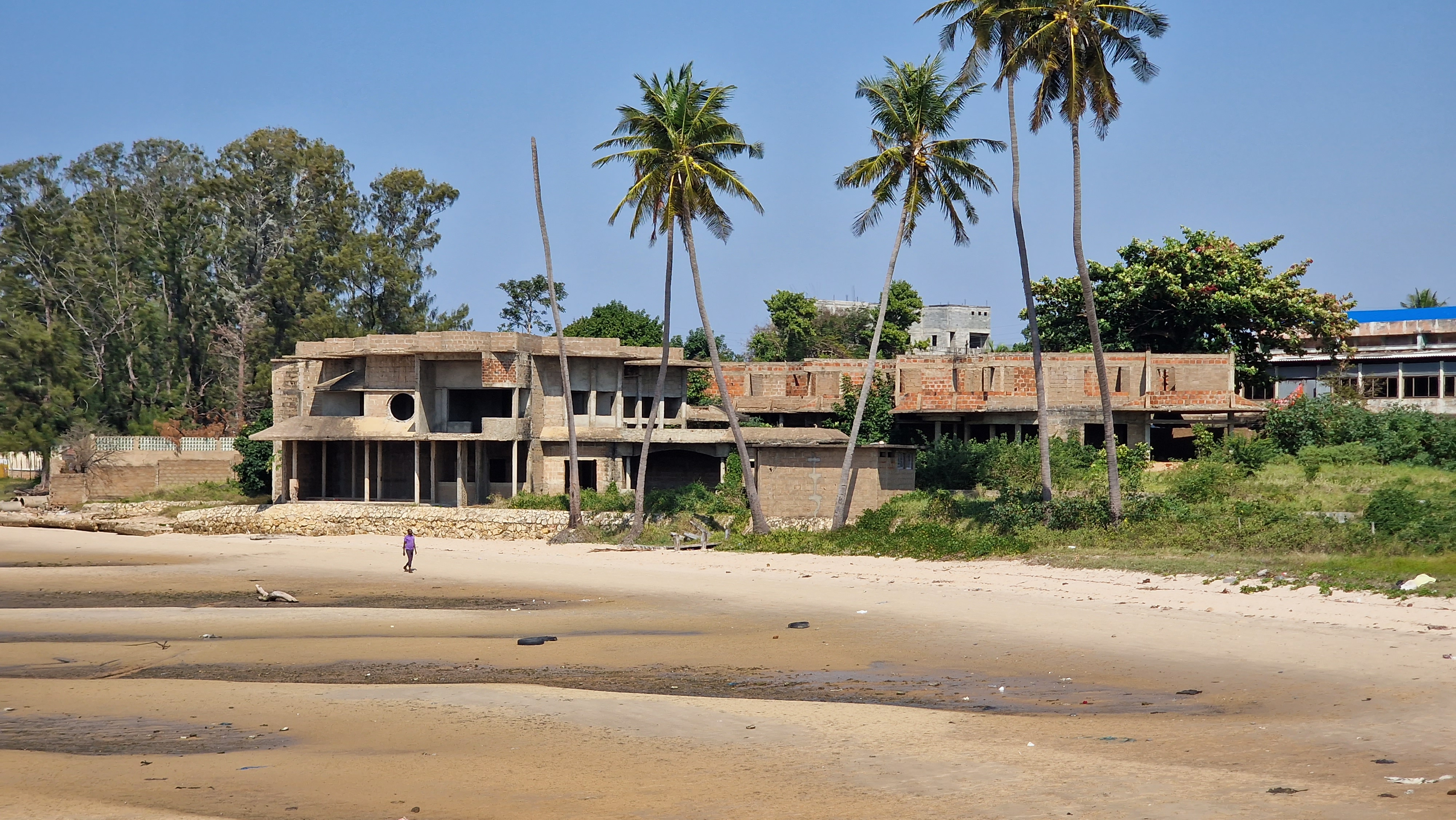
- Maxixe

- Location within Mozambique
- Coordinates: 23°52′S 35°21′E
- Country: Mozambique
- Province: Inhambane

Population (2017 census)
  - Total: 123,868

Maxixe (Portuguese pronunciation: [maˈʃiʃi]) is the largest city and economic capital of the province of Inhambane, Mozambique. It is situated on the Indian Ocean at 23°52′S 35°23′E just south of the Tropic of Capricorn, in a bay opposite historic Inhambane City which can be reached by local ferries. Although Maxixe is the province's principal city, Inhambane City is the seat of the provincial government.

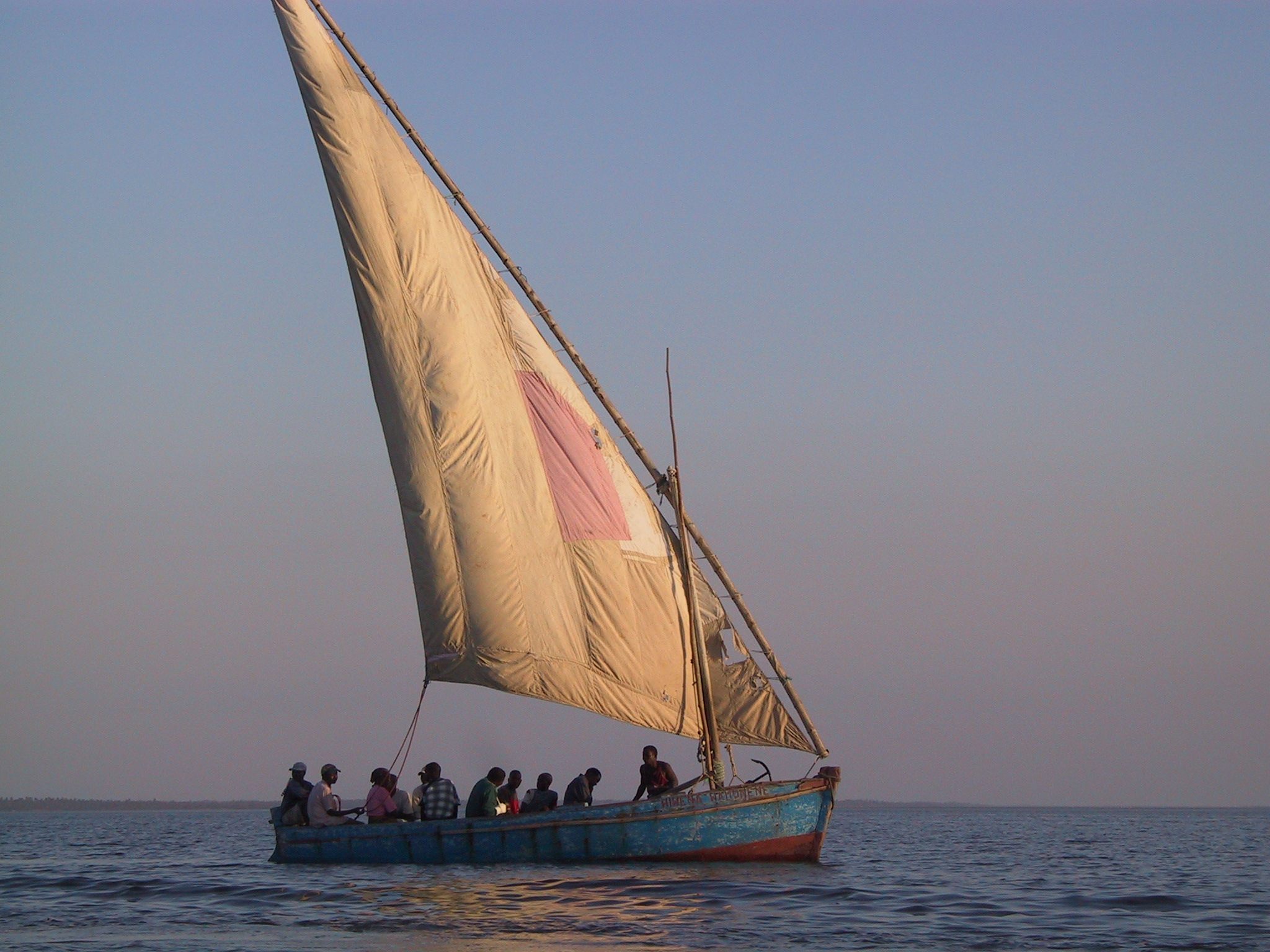
Dhow ferrying passengers from Inhambane to Maxixe in 2006.

By road the distance to Inhambane is far longer and is approximately 60 kilometres.

Maxixe serves as a convenient stop for transportation heading North or South along the EN1.

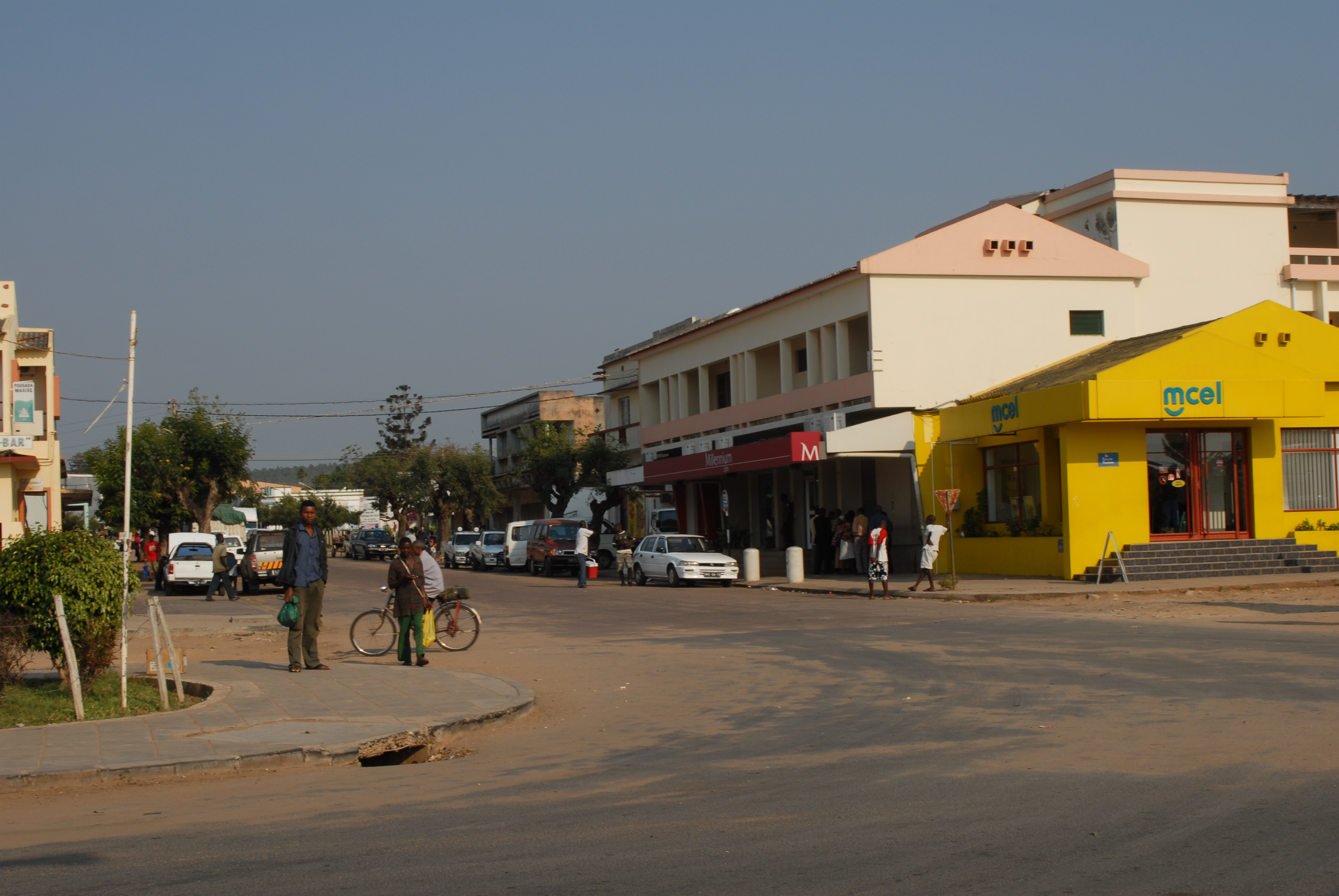

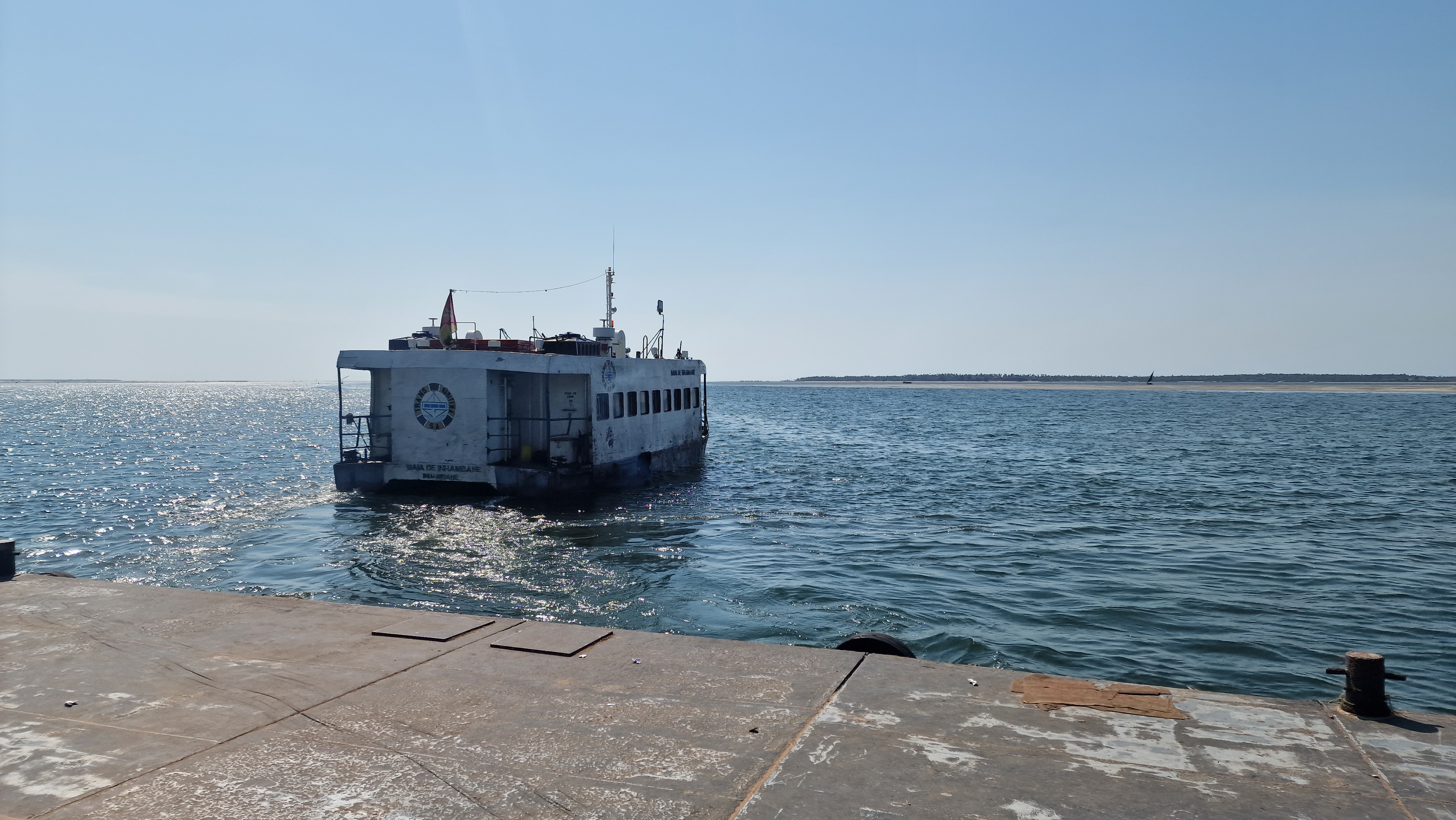
The ferry from Maxixe to Inhambane

== Demographics ==
| Year | Population |
|---|---|
| 1997 | 97,173 |
| 2007 | 105,895 |
