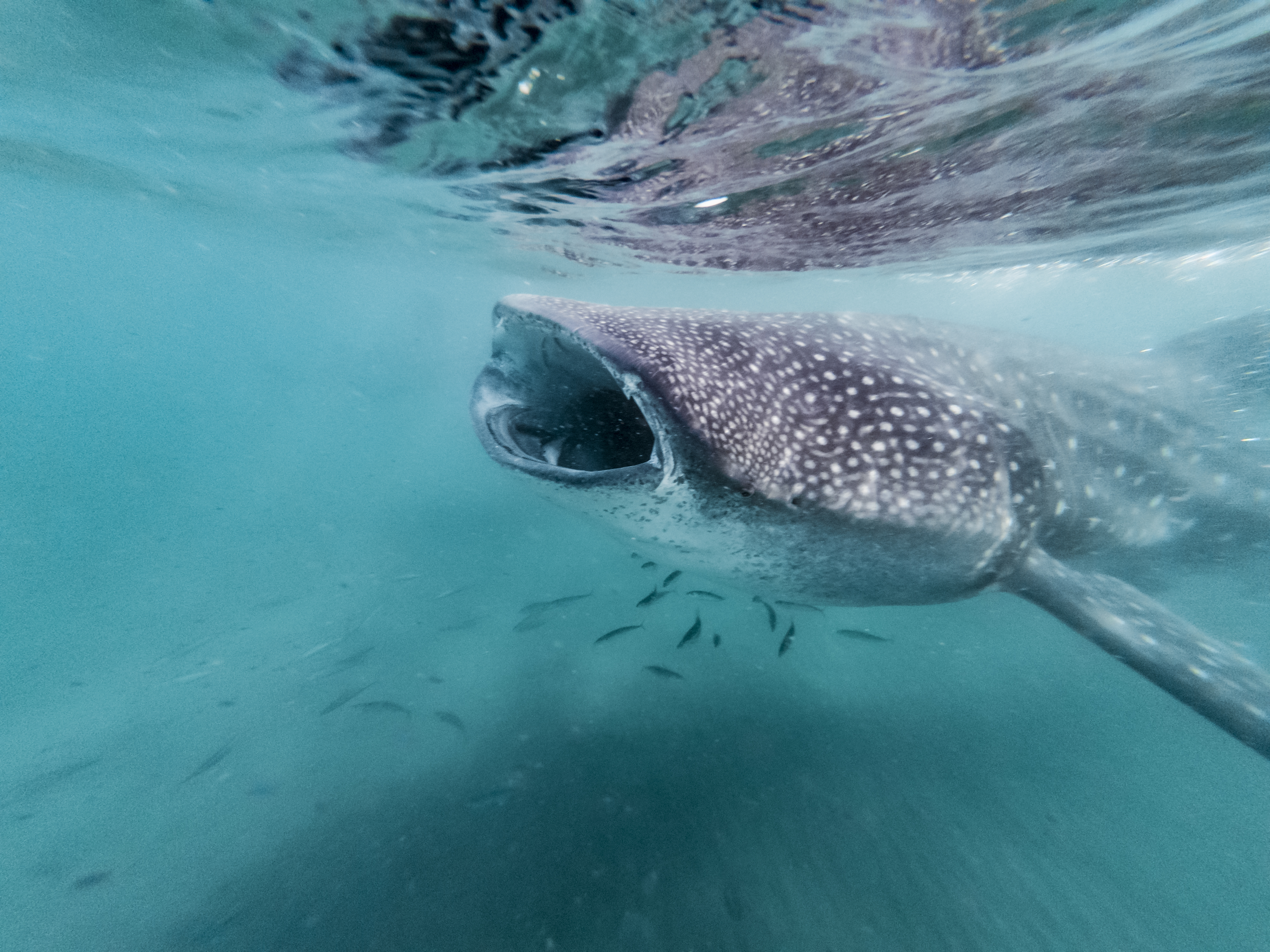
- Whale shark feeding

Scientific classification
- Kingdom: Animalia
- Phylum: Chordata
- Class: Chondrichthyes
- Subclass: Elasmobranchii
- Division: Selachii
- Order: Orectolobiformes
- Family: Rhincodontidae; J. P. Müller and Henle, 1839

Genera
- Rhincodon A. Smith, 1829; †Palaeorhincodon Herman, 1974

= Rhincodontidae =

Rhincodontidae Temporal range: 60–0 Ma Paleocene - Present

Family of sharks

Rhincodontidae is a shark family which includes the whale shark, the sole extant member and the largest living fish. A single extinct genus, Palaeorhincodon, is known from the Paleocene and Eocene as well.
