= Inhambane =

Inhambane Terra de Boa Gente
- City
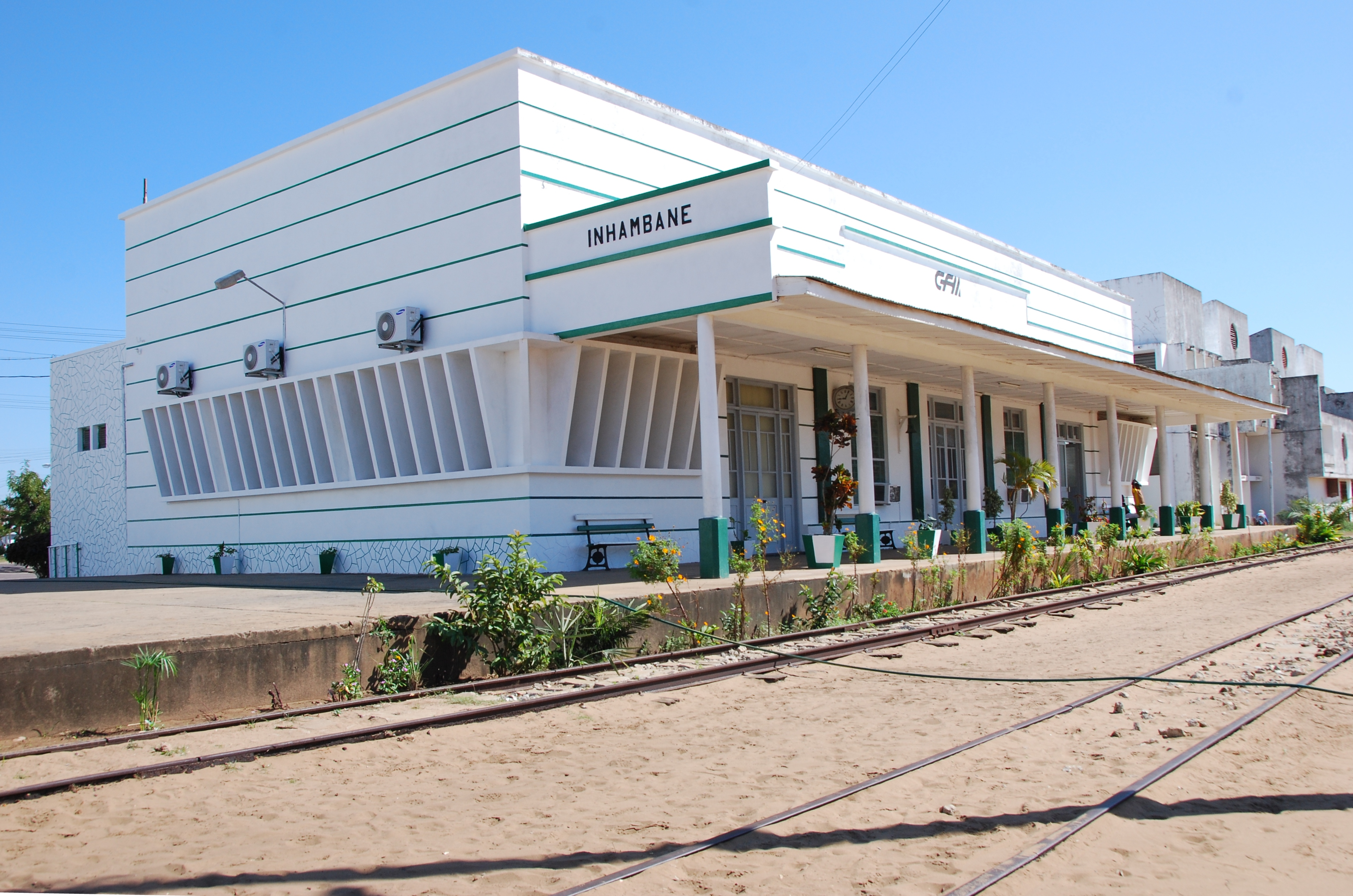
- Inhambane railway station

- Flag

- Location within Mozambique
- Coordinates: 23°51′54″S 35°23′00″E
- Country: Mozambique
- Province: Inhambane Province
- Founded: 11th century
- Elevation: 1 m (3.3 ft)

Population (2017 census)
  - Total: 79,724
- Time zone: +1
- Postal code: 1307
- Area code: (+258)
- Climate: Aw

Satellite view of Inhambane Bay, captured by the Copernicus Sentinel-2 mission.

Inhambane [iɲɐ̃ˈbani] (also known as Terra de Boa Gente lit. 'Land of the Good People') is a city located in southern Mozambique, lying on Inhambane Bay, 470 km northeast of Maputo. It is the capital of the Inhambane Province and, according to the 2017 census, has a population of 79,724, growing from 54,157 in the 1997 census.

The settlement owes its existence to a deep inlet into which the small Mutamba River flows. Two protective sandy headlands protect the harbour and form a sandbank. The sister town of Maxixe is located across the bay from Inhambane.

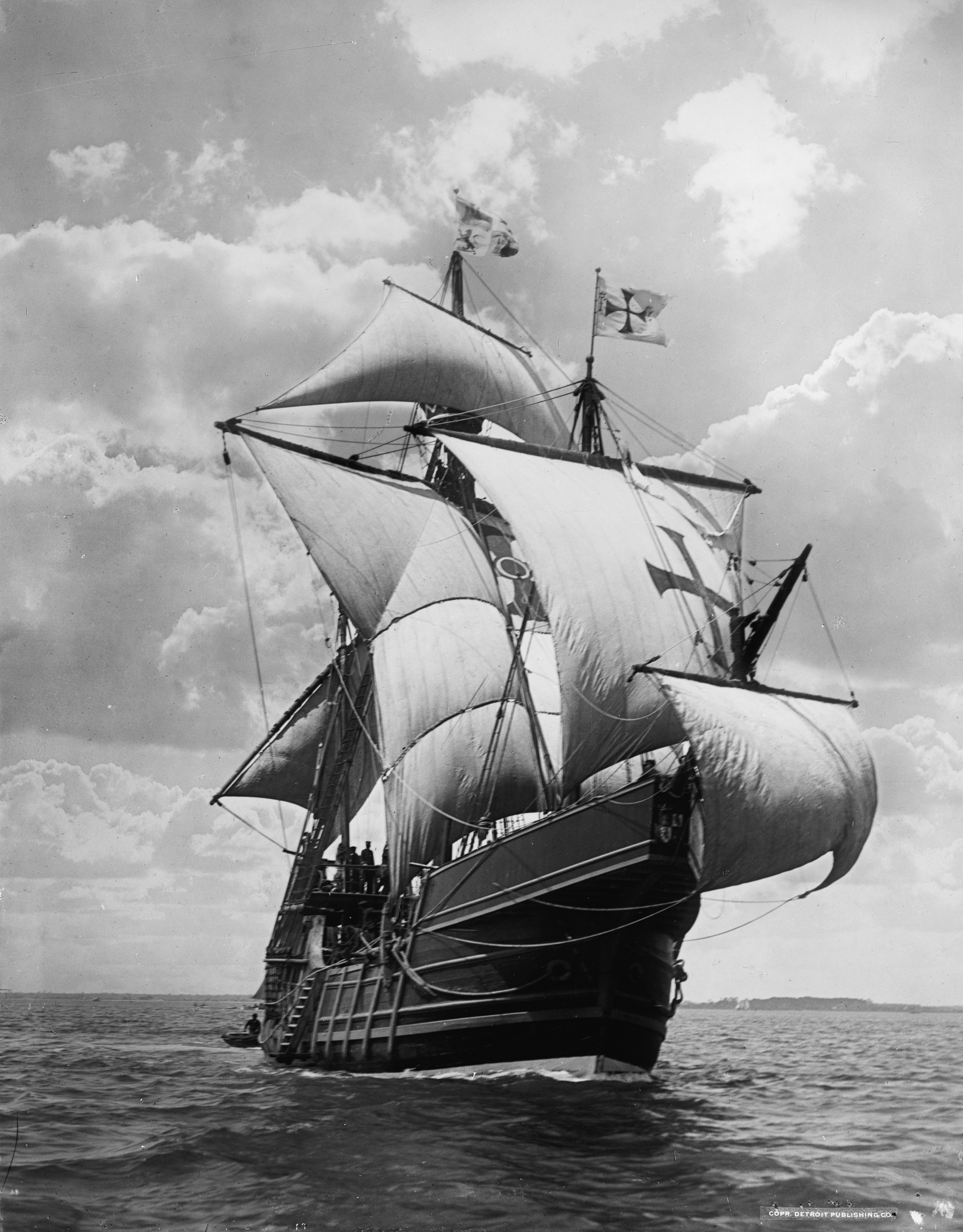
A Francisco de Almeida ship

== History ==
Inhambane is one of the oldest settlements on Mozambique's Eastern coast. In their history, they are recorded as city-state that submitted to different empires throughout their time, starting from the Kilwa Sultanate, the Gaza Empire, and finally Portuguese Mozambique. Dhows traded here as early as the 11th century. Muslim and Persian traders were the first outsiders to reach the area by sea and traded pearls and ambergris. They also traded at Chibuene in the north. The area became well known for its local cotton spinning and production by the Bitonga tribe. Sometime before the Portuguese reached the area, the Karanga had invaded Inhambane and formed a number of local chiefdoms. They dominated the Tonga cotton workers and reaped the rewards of trading with the Muslims.

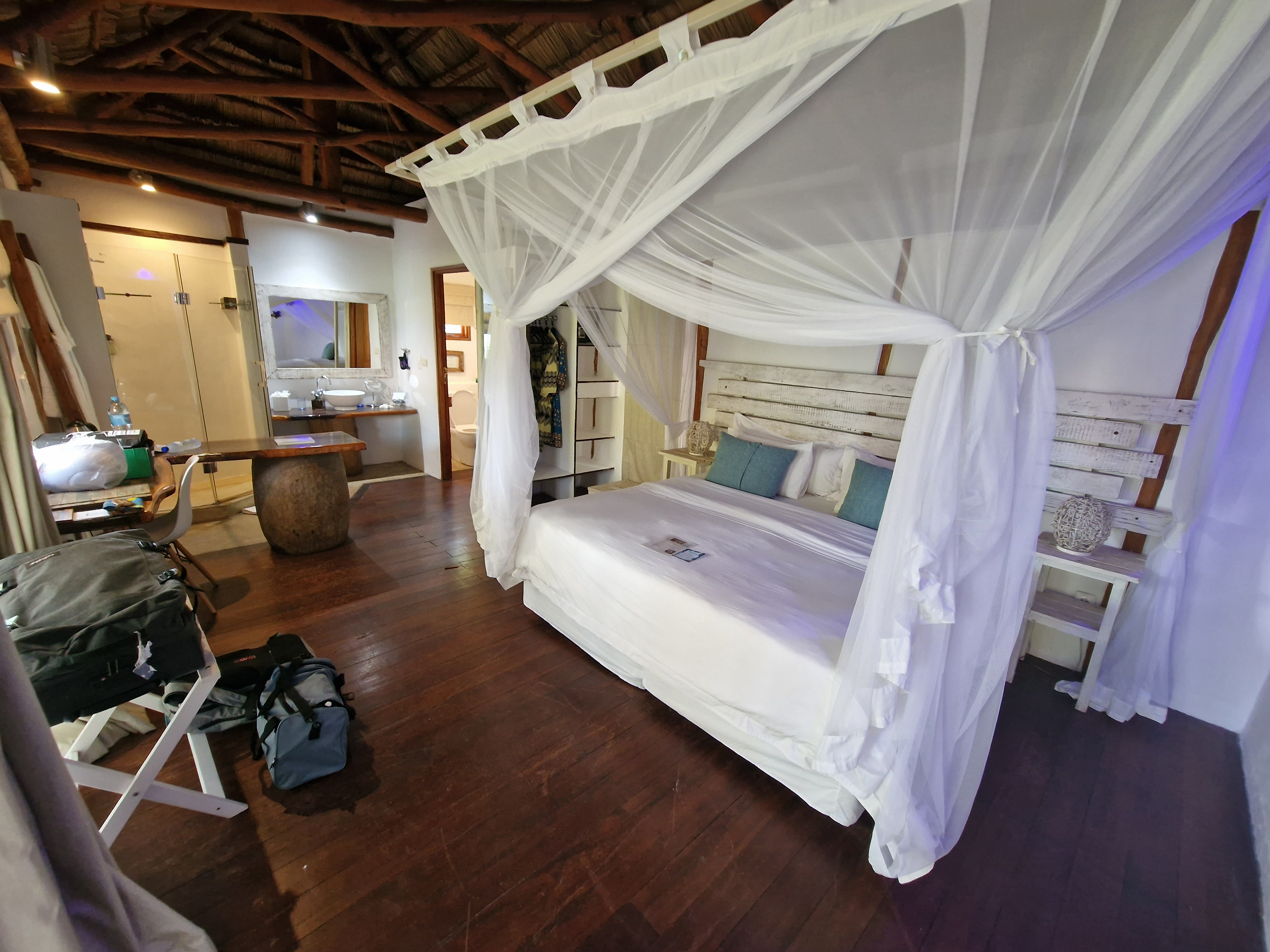
Coastal lodge room with mosquito netting in Inhambane Province

When Vasco da Gama rounded Africa in the late 15th century, he pulled into Inhambane to replenish stocks and to explore. He took an immediate liking to the area and named it Terra de Boa Gente or 'Land of the Good People'. In 1505, a ship sent by Francisco de Almeida was shipwrecked south of the town, but the Portuguese gained an initial meeting with the Karanga chiefs. Later, their sons landed on Mozambique Island to survey the situation. The Portuguese eventually established a permanent trading post at settlement in 1534. Inhambane was then chosen as the first Jesuit mission to Southeast Africa in 1560. The port gradually grew as an ivory and slave trading centre, particularly in the eighteenth century under mostly Indian control. It was destroyed in 1834 by Soshangane, but grew rapidly in the second half of the century as a town of Portuguese East Africa. The old cathedral and old mosque were built during that period. However, in the 20th century the status of the town declined, and the economic situation worsened as Maputo (called Lourenço Marques before 1975) became the main centre.

The 170-year-old Cathedral of our Lady of Conception is located in the old quarter of the city where a rusted ladder leads to the top of the spire, offering panoramic views of the city and harbour. The city is now home to a museum and a market and is known for its nearby beaches of Tofo and Barra. The central market located along the main boulevard called simply "Mercado Central" offers numerous foods, ranging from a colourful array of spices and vegetables to prawns, fishes, and cashew nuts.

Motor and dhow taxis sail from the town to Maxixe. The town of Inhambane has one of the largest working fleets of dhows on the Swahili Coast.

Tofo Beach, Inhabame, Mozambique

== Recreation ==
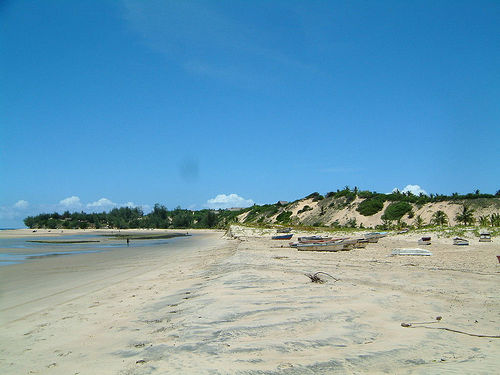
Barra beach (Ponto do Barra)

Notable sites in the surrounding district of Inhambane and Vilanculos include Bazaruto National Park, the largest sea park in Africa, the Praia do Tofo, Praia dos Cocos, Ponto do Barra, Ilha de Benquerra, Bazaruto National Sea Park, Guinjata Bay. Scuba diving in Inhambane is particularly popular in locations such as Manta Reef and Gallaria. Giant manta rays, whale sharks, turtles and other marine life are regularly seen and there are many professional scuba diving operations throughout the province. Many tourists are under the impression that they can dive from Inhambane itself. The closest diving to Inhambane is actually at Praia do Tofo - 22 km from Inhambane City. Tofo is known as the whale shark mecca of the world.

== Transport ==
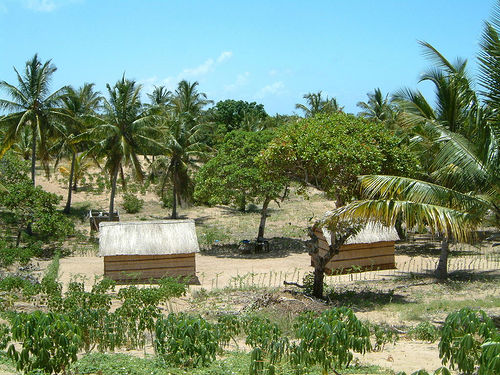
Village in Inhambane province near the town

The easiest way to reach Inhambane is by road from Maputo on the EN 1. It is also possible to reach Inhambane from Beira, Mozambique or Zimbabwe on the EN 6 and EN 1 after Inchope. Inhambane has an airport Inhambane Airport and there are flights from Maputo on most days and charters flying in from Johannesburg in South Africa.

== Notable people ==
- Sung Min Cho

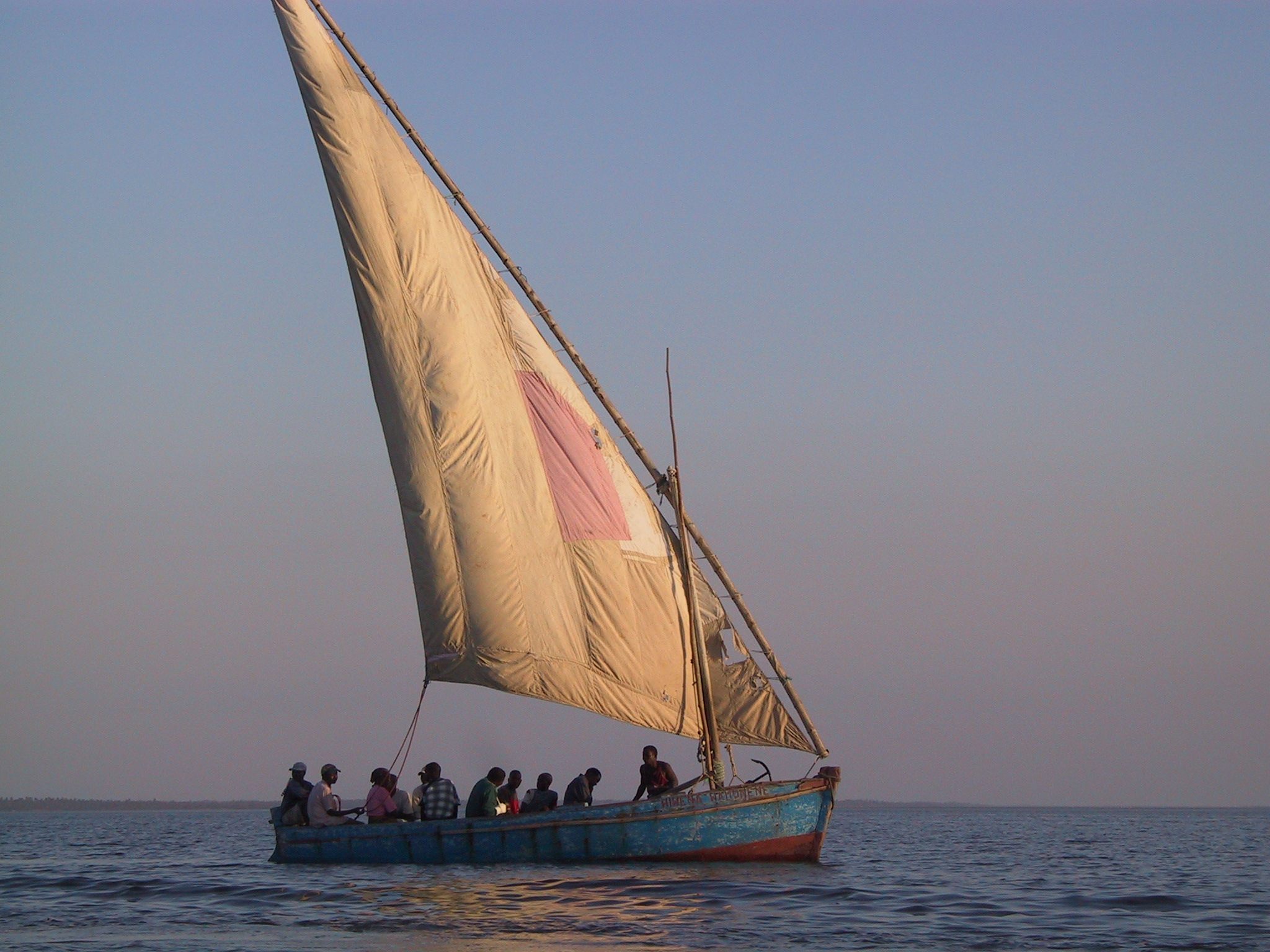
Dhow ferrying passengers from Inhambane to Maxixe in 2006.

== International relations ==
Inhambane is twinned with:

- (Portugal) Aveiro

=== Railway ===
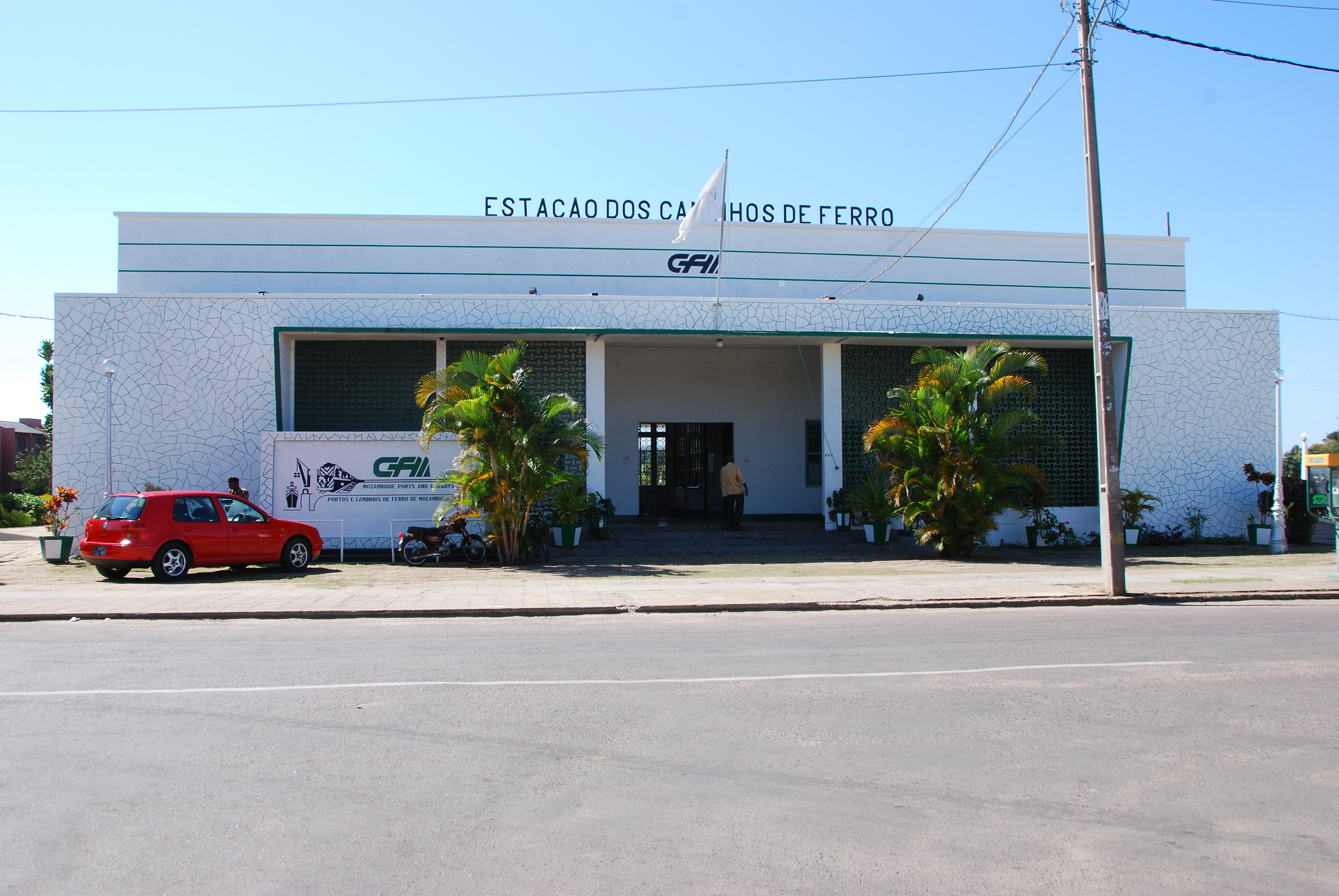
Estação do Caminho de Ferro Inhambane front side

Inhambane has/had a narrow-gauge railway that was terminated before its full extent was realised.

== Climate ==
Inhambane has a tropical savanna climate (Köppen climate classification Aw).

Climate data for Inhambane (1991–2020 normals, extremes 1961–1990, 2007–2023)
Month	Jan	Feb	Mar	Apr	May	Jun	Jul	Aug	Sep	Oct	Nov	Dec	Year
Record high °C (°F)	36.0 (96.8)	37.1 (98.8)	35.6 (96.1)	34.9 (94.8)	33.2 (91.8)	32.7 (90.9)	31.5 (88.7)	33.2 (91.8)	34.5 (94.1)	35.0 (95.0)	37.3 (99.1)	39.8 (103.6)	39.8 (103.6)
Mean daily maximum °C (°F)	31.4 (88.5)	31.4 (88.5)	31.2 (88.2)	29.1 (84.4)	27.6 (81.7)	26.6 (79.9)	25.6 (78.1)	26.3 (79.3)	27.2 (81.0)	28.4 (83.1)	29.3 (84.7)	30.6 (87.1)	28.7 (83.7)
Daily mean °C (°F)	27.8 (82.0)	27.8 (82.0)	27.0 (80.6)	25.4 (77.7)	23.6 (74.5)	21.8 (71.2)	21.2 (70.2)	22.2 (72.0)	23.3 (73.9)	24.5 (76.1)	25.9 (78.6)	27.2 (81.0)	24.8 (76.7)
Mean daily minimum °C (°F)	23.1 (73.6)	23.8 (74.8)	22.5 (72.5)	20.3 (68.5)	18.3 (64.9)	16.5 (61.7)	15.4 (59.7)	16.0 (60.8)	18.3 (64.9)	19.6 (67.3)	21.1 (70.0)	22.2 (72.0)	19.8 (67.6)
Record low °C (°F)	16.7 (62.1)	17.0 (62.6)	18.1 (64.6)	15.4 (59.7)	10.6 (51.1)	10.6 (51.1)	10.1 (50.2)	10.0 (50.0)	11.0 (51.8)	10.6 (51.1)	14.1 (57.4)	16.6 (61.9)	10.0 (50.0)
Average precipitation mm (inches)	152.2 (5.99)	135.8 (5.35)	109.9 (4.33)	77.6 (3.06)	59.1 (2.33)	55.6 (2.19)	35.0 (1.38)	30.6 (1.20)	36.4 (1.43)	37.6 (1.48)	75.8 (2.98)	144.2 (5.68)	949.8 (37.39)
Average precipitation days (≥ 1.0 mm)	5.4	5.6	4.6	3.8	3.4	2.9	2.5	1.8	1.5	2.0	3.6	4.8	41.9
Average relative humidity (%)	75	75	74	75	77	78	76	75	75	74	73	73	75
Mean monthly sunshine hours	207.7	194.9	204.6	207.0	220.1	192.0	210.8	229.4	210.0	223.2	195.0	210.8	2,505.5
Mean daily sunshine hours	6.7	6.9	6.6	6.9	7.1	6.4	6.8	7.4	7.0	7.2	6.5	6.8	6.9
Source 1: World Meteorological Organization (precipitation 1961–1990) Starlings Roost Weather
Source 2: Deutscher Wetterdienst (extremes, humidity and sun 1961–1990)

== See also ==
- Railway stations in Mozambique
- Tofo
- Tofinho
