= Tofo =

Tofo Nhatofo Tofo Mozambique
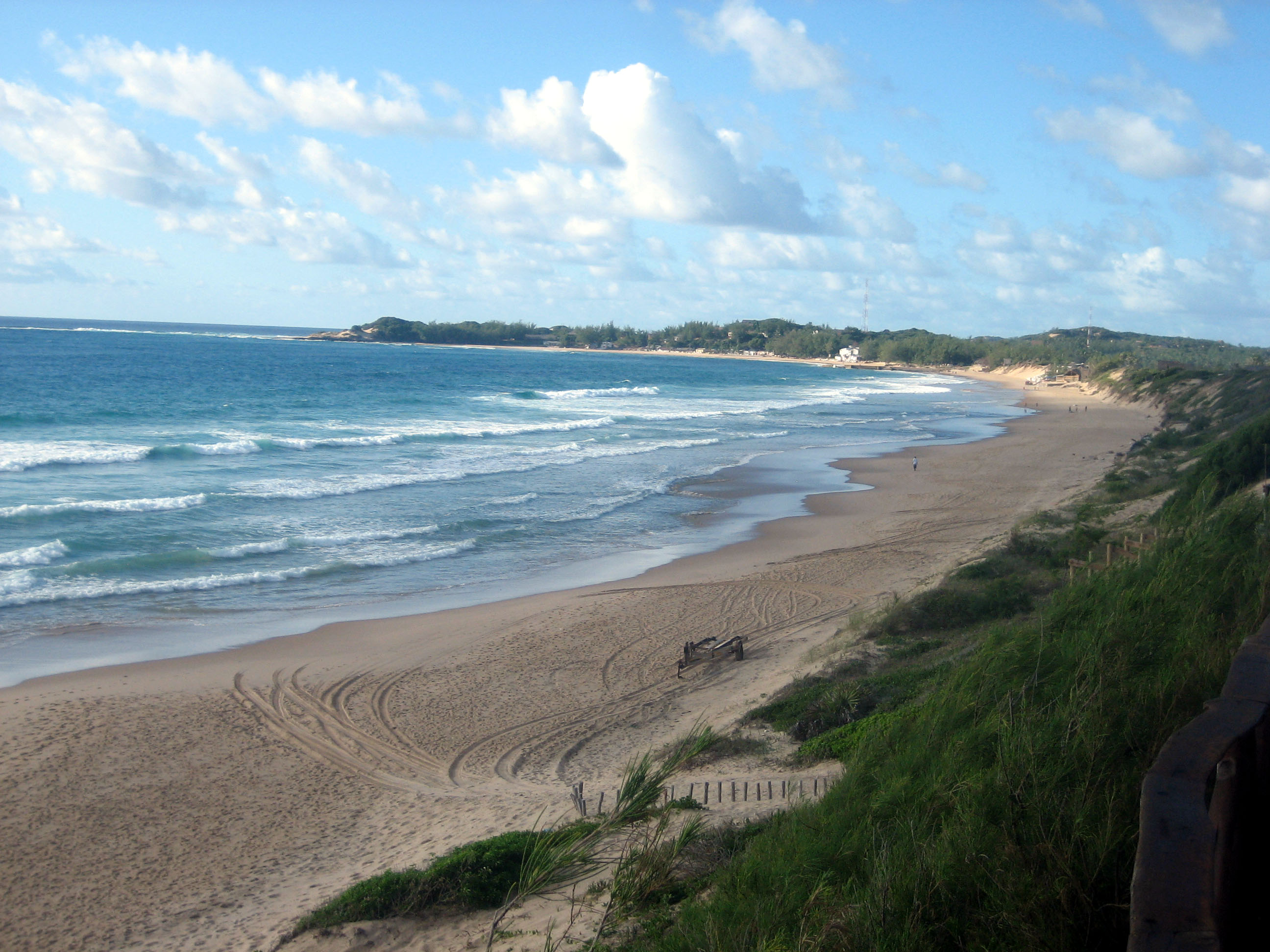
- Nickname: Tof
- Location within Mozambique
- Coordinates: 23°51′20″S 35°32′53″E
- Country: Mozambique
- Province: Inhambane

Area
  - Total: 17 km^{2} (6.6 sq mi)
  - Land: 9 km^{2} (3.5 sq mi)
  - Water: 8 km^{2} (3.1 sq mi)
- Elevation: 0 m (0 ft)

Population
  - Total: 15,000
  - Density: 7/km^{2} (18/sq mi)
- Time zone: +2
- Postal code: 1300
- Area code: +258
- Website: https://tofomz.com

Tofo Beach (Portuguese: Praia do Tofo) or simply Tofo is a small town in southeastern Mozambique. The town lies on the Indian Ocean coast, on Barra Beach peninsula in Inhambane Province, Jangamo District, 22 km drive from Inhambane city.

== History ==
Tofo has a history that dates back to the pre-colonial era. The town was originally inhabited by the Bitonga people, who were skilled fishermen and traders. During the 16th century, Portuguese explorers arrived in the region and established a trading post in nearby Inhambane. This led to the introduction of Christianity and the Portuguese language to the area.

In the 19th century, the Bitonga people were conquered by the Gaza Empire, which was led by the powerful ruler Soshangane. The Gaza Empire controlled much of what is now southern Mozambique, including the Tofo region. The Bitonga people were forced to pay tribute to the Gaza Empire, and many were enslaved and taken to other parts of the empire.

During the colonial era, Tofo and the surrounding region became part of Portuguese East Africa. The Portuguese introduced cashew farming to the area, and many local people were forced to work on the plantations.

== Notable people ==
- Sung Min Cho

== See also ==
- Inhambane
