= Bazaruto =

Bazaruto may refer to:

- Bazaruto Archipelago, Mozambique
- Bazaruto Island, Mozambique
- Bazaruto National Park, Mozambique
