= Inhassoro District =

Coordinates: 21°32′S 35°12′E

Inhassoro
- District
- Inhassoro District on the map of Mozambique
- Country: Mozambique
- Province: Inhambane
- Capital: Inhassoro

Area
  - Total: 4,480 km^{2} (1,730 sq mi)

Population (2007 census)
  - Total: 48,537
  - Density: 10.8/km^{2} (28.1/sq mi)

Inhassoro District is a district of Inhambane Province in south-east Mozambique. The district is located at the northeast of the province, and borders with Govuro District in the north, Vilanculos District in the southeast, Massinga District in the south, Funhalouro District in the southwest, and with Mabote District in the west. In the east, the district is bounded by the Indian Ocean. The area of the district is 4,480 square kilometres (1,730 mi^{2}). It has a population of 48,537 as of 2007.

== Geography ==
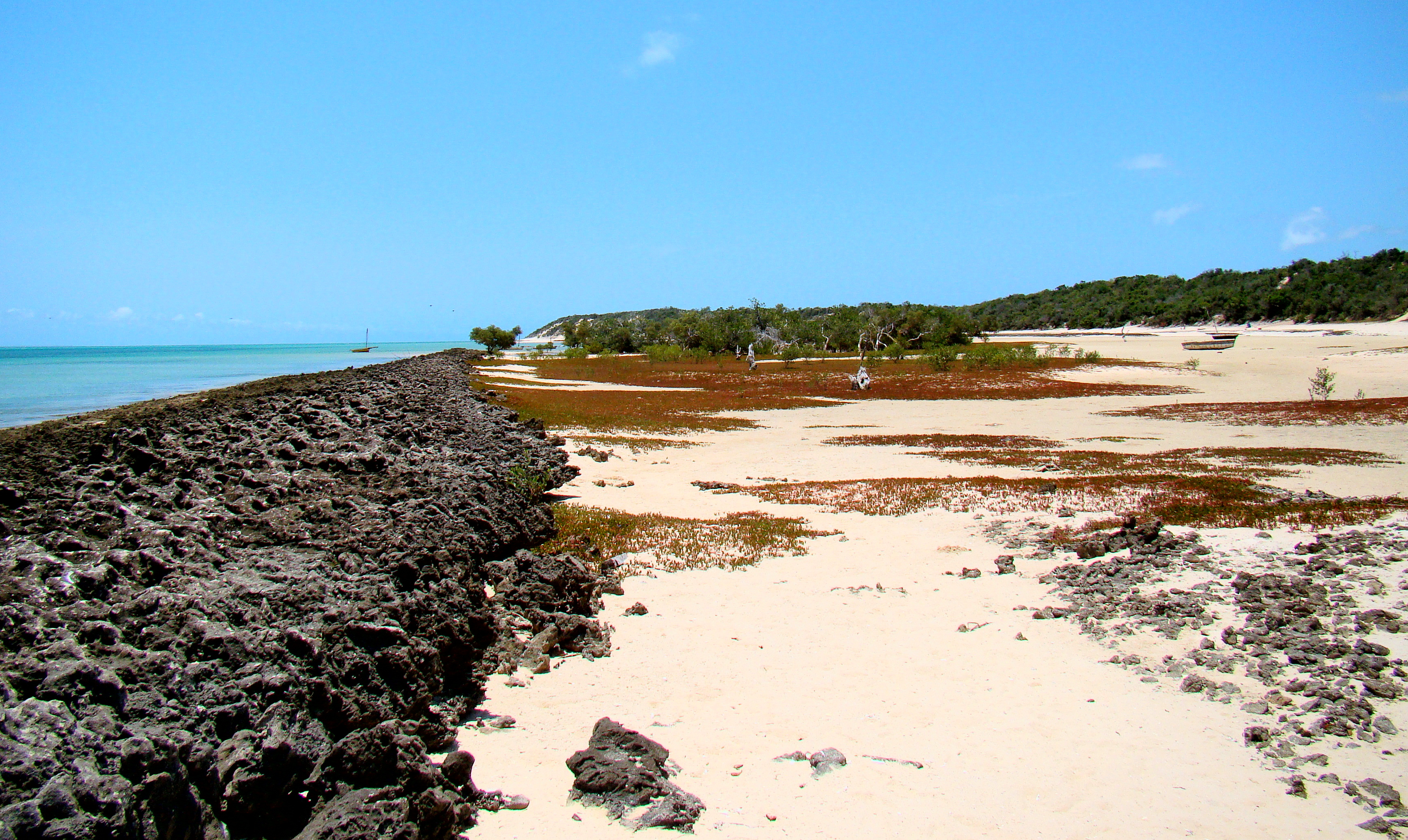
The coast of Bazaruto Island

The islands, part of the Bazaruto Archipelago, occupy the area of 35.5 square kilometres (13.7 mi^{2}). The archipelago consists of six islands, four of which, Bazaruto, Benguerra, Magaruque, and Santa Carolina, belong to Inhassoro District. Bazaruto National Park is located on the archipelago and serves as a location of popular high-end sea resorts.

The Govuro River is the biggest and the only significant river in the district.

The climate is tropical arid in the interior of the district and tropical humid at the coast. The annual rainfall at the coast achieves 1,500 millimetres (59 in), mainly falling in February and March.

== Administrative divisions ==
The district is divided into two postos, Inhassoro (four localities) and Bazaruto (one locality).

== Demographics ==
As of 2005, 41% of the population of the district was younger than 15 years. 33% did speak Portuguese, and Chitsua language was the mothertongue for the majority of the population of the district. 71% were analphabetic, mostly women.

== Economy ==
In 2005, 1% of the households in the district had electricity. Fishing and woodcutting are widespread.

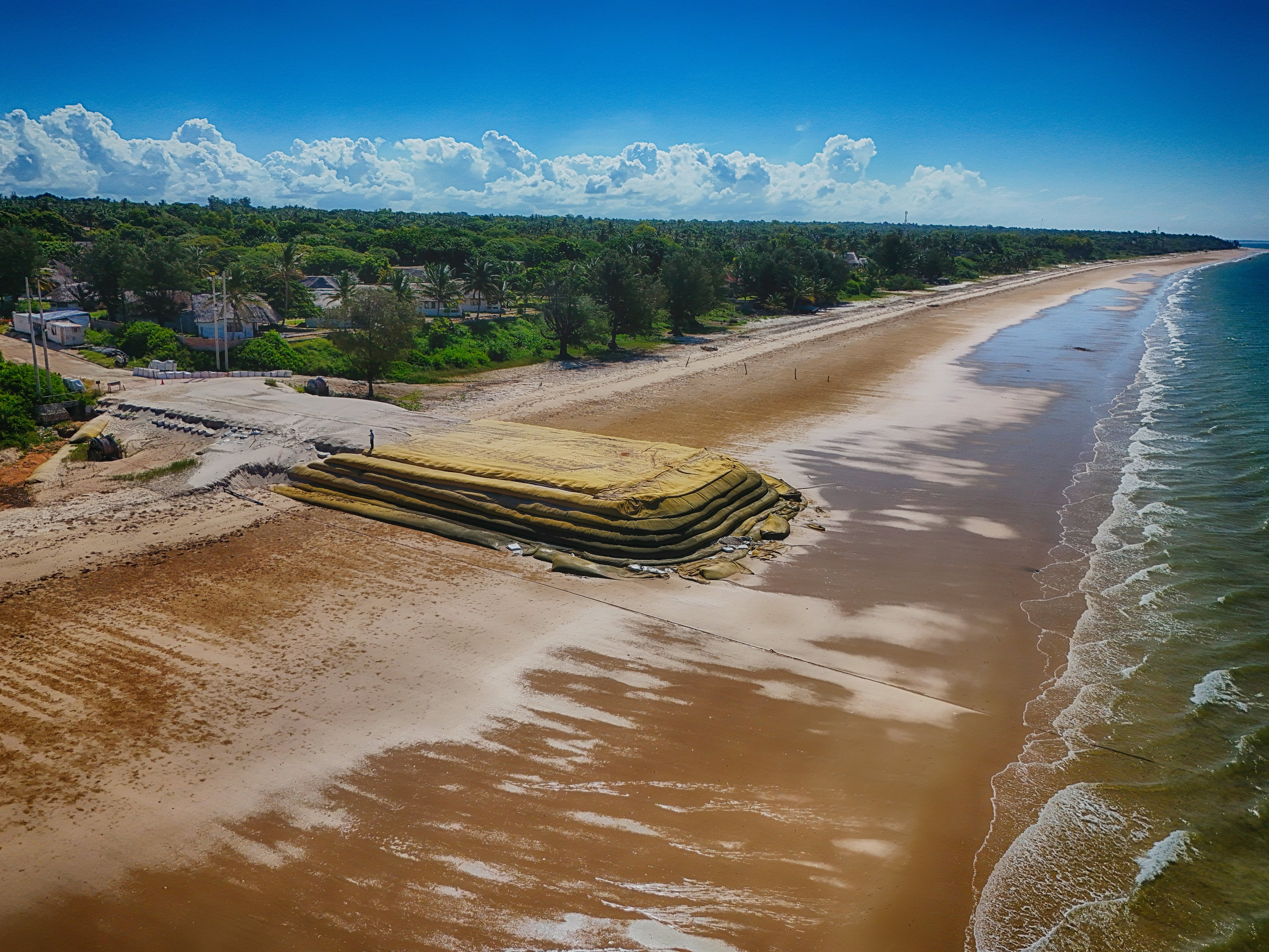
The pier at Inhassoro, Mozambique.

=== Agriculture ===
In 2005, the district had 10,000 farms exploiting on average the area of 1.6 hectares (0.0062 mi^{2}) each. The main agricultural products are maize, cassava, cowpea, peanuts, sweet potatoes, sunflower, and rice.

=== Transportation ===
There is a road network in the district which includes the 95 kilometres (59 mi) stretch of the national road EN1, crossing the eastern part of the district.

Bazaruto Island Airport serves the islands. It is used by lodges which charter flights from Vilankulo.
