= Bazaruto Island =

Island in southern Mozambique

Bazaruto
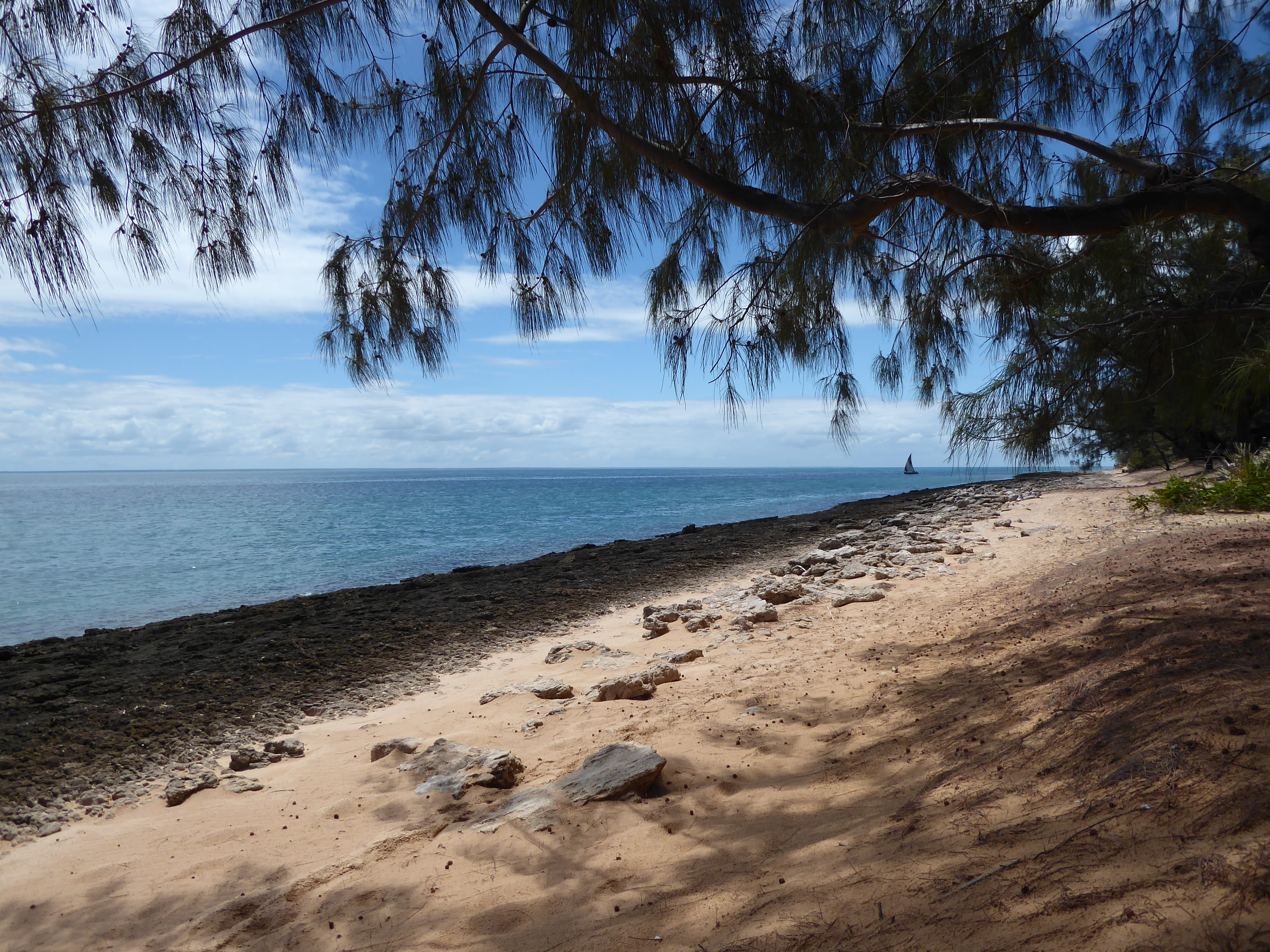
- Beach on Bazaruto

- Location within Mozambique

Geography
- Coordinates: 21°39′18″S 35°28′21″E
- Type: Barrier island
- Archipelago: Bazaruto Archipelago
- Area: 110 km^{2} (42 sq mi)
- Length: 31.2 km (19.39 mi)
- Highest elevation: 90 m (300 ft)

Administration
- Mozambique
- Province: Inhambane
- District: Inhassoro

Bazaruto (Portuguese pronunciation: [bazaˈɾutu]) is a barrier island in the Bazaruto Archipelago of southern Mozambique. The largest island of the archipelago, Bazaruto sits near the eastern rim of the African continental shelf, sheltering the mainland coast on the other side of Bazaruto Bay. Formed during the Pleistocene, Bazaruto's sand dunes along its eastern shore are among the tallest of any barrier island, reaching heights up to 90 m (300 ft). Besides the dune system, the island is dotted with grasslands, salt marshes, mangrove swamps, and patches of freshwater wetland. It harbors a variety of wildlife, including blue monkeys, harnessed bushbuck, and red forest duiker. The waters around the island are a vital refuge for dugongs and sea turtles.

Occupied since the Iron Age, Bazaruto formed part of the Indian Ocean trade network for thousands of years. It fell under increasing Portuguese influence beginning in the late 16th century, and was administered under a series of mulatto landlords and chieftains. It was officially gifted to the Portuguese crown in 1721, and was loosely administered under the Prazo of Mambone. Food insecurity and frequent raids by slave traders and neighboring tribes depopulated the island by the mid-19th century. It was repopulated by the end of the century by a group of Tsonga, who form the majority of the island's population today. After Mozambique's independence and the ensuing Mozambican Civil War, many refugees settled on the island.

Bazaruto has been part of the Bazaruto Archipelago National Park since 2001. Tourism and fishing are the main local economic activities, although agriculture and ranching are also present on the island. A variety of hotels and lodges have been established on the island to cater to tourists.

== Geography ==
Bazaruto is the largest and northernmost island of the Bazaruto Archipelago off the coast of southern Mozambique. It is a long, narrow barrier island, 31.2 km (19.4 mi) in length and around 110 km^{2} (42 sq mi) in area. (Note: One source gives the area as 103.4 km^{2} (39.9 sq mi), while another gives the area as "around 120 km^{2} (46 sq mi)".) It sits close to the rim of the narrow continental shelf, separated 14.2 km (8.8 mi) from the coast of mainland Mozambique by Bazaruto Bay. Bazaruto has extremely tall sand dunes for a barrier island, with some reaching 90 m (300 ft) in elevation; these are some of the tallest known dunes on a barrier island. Small freshwater lakes dot the island, with depths up to 3 m (10 ft).

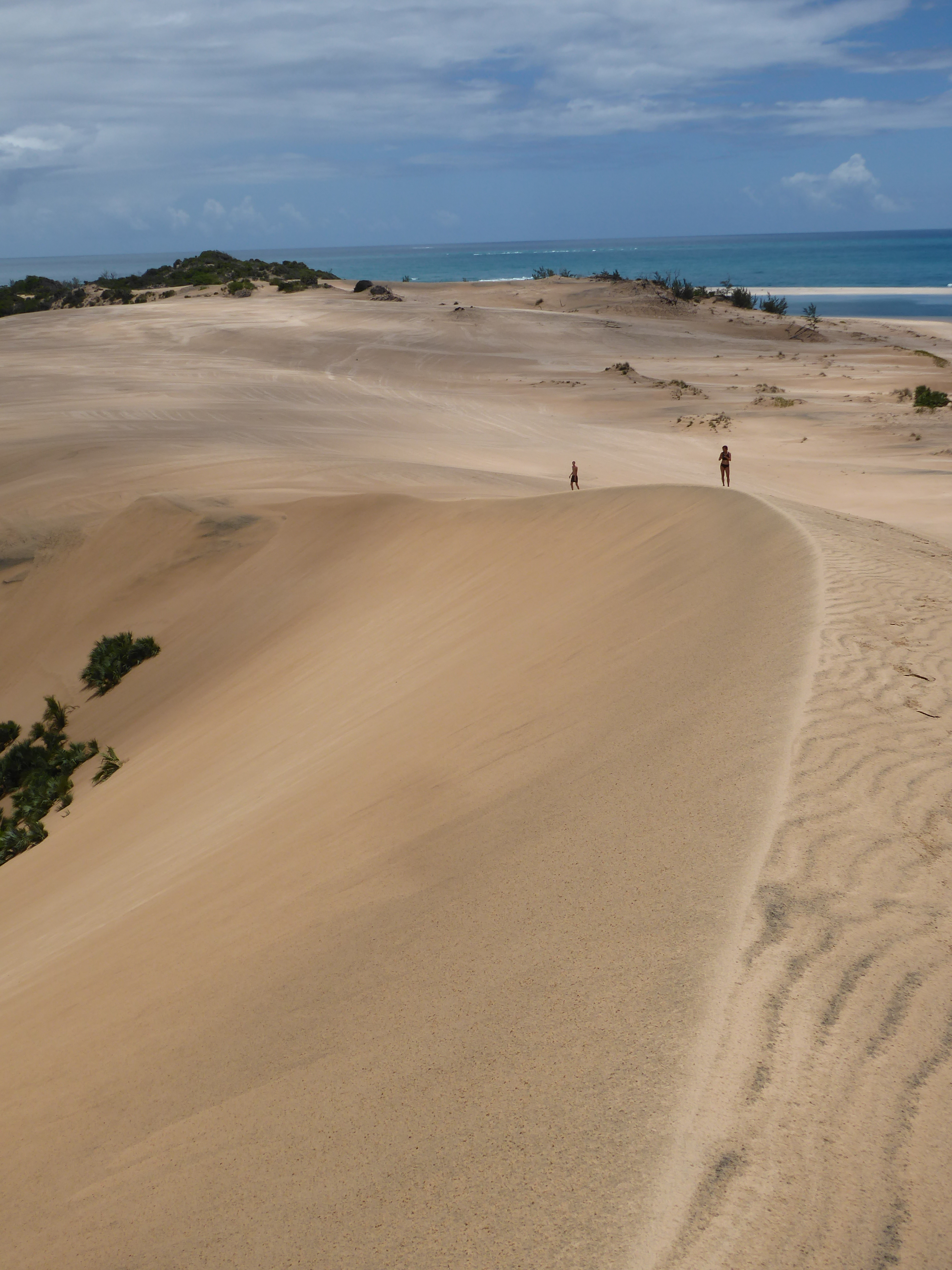
Sand dunes on Bazaruto

The core of Bazaruto's sand dunes formed during the Pleistocene, now in an orange-red color. More recent yellow-white Holocene dunes are found along the shoreline. During the Last Glacial Maximum, the local sea level sank to 130 m (430 ft) below present levels, raising the island significantly above water. Water levels have varied slightly over the course of the Holocene; offshore aeolianite formations, now covered in coral, mark the former coastline of the island.

The island sits along a mesotidal coastline, with a tidal range of around 3 m (9.8 ft). A large sand spit extends 6 km (3.7 mi) from the northern end of the island, with large mudflats stretching along both of the spit's sides. The spit is sometimes subject to overwash. Large beachrock outcrops emerge along both sides of the island and are quarried for use as construction material. These form two layers; one along the intertidal zone, and one several meters above high tide. The higher of these formations likely formed during locally higher water levels several thousand years ago.

=== Climate ===
Bazaruto, like most of Mozambique, has a tropical savanna climate, designated as Aw according to the Köppen climate classification. It experiences an annual rainfall of around 978 mm (38.5 in). It is exposed to the trade winds, with wind generally hitting the island while blowing to the southeast. The archipelago experiences an average temperature of 24 °C (75 °F), with highs up to 30 °C (86 °F) during the summer and lows of 18 °C (64 °F) during the winter. Water temperatures in the surrounding area range from 24–28 °C (75–82 °F). The island lies within a high-risk area for tropical cyclone activity.

== History ==
Archaeological finds at Bazaruto date to the late Iron Age, around the 3rd century CE, attested by sites such as Ponta Dundo, alongside slightly later mainland sites around the Save River estuary, including Chibuene. Bazaruto formed part of an early center of Indian Ocean trade, evidenced by the recovery of Persian porcelain from the Ponta Dundo site. Pearls, amber, tortoise shell, and dugong teeth were prominent trade goods exported from the archipelago.

The island had become increasingly connected to the rising Muslim city-states of the Swahili coast, such as Kilwa, Mombasa, and Malindi. By the early 1500s, Portuguese sources referred to the islands as the Húcicas Grandes, describing them as inhabited by "Black Moor" traders. Afro-Portuguese mulatto families gained increasing prominence as the region fell under Portuguese trade influence. António Rodrigues (fl. 1589) owned Bazaruto and portions of the adjacent mainland; his friendliness towards Portuguese sailors led to the island becoming a resupply point for ships. This status was supported by the presence of freshwater lagoons, which also enabled cattle ranching on the island.

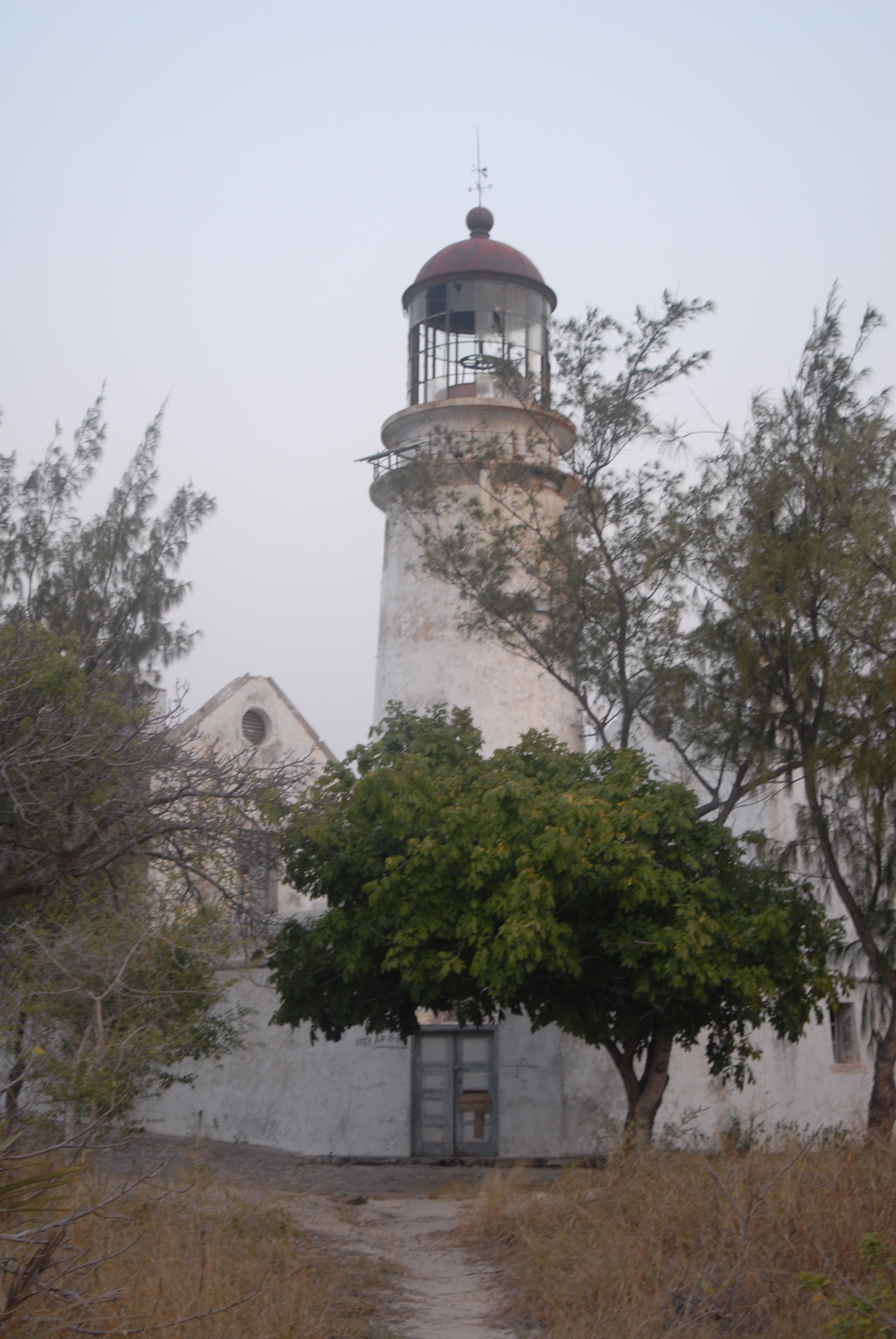
Lighthouse on Bazaruto, constructed during the colonial period

The island fell under a succession of prominent landowning families. A Sofala mulatto named Luís Pereira controlled Bazaruto in the late 1600s. Mucissa, a regional chieftain, was aided in a power struggle against his brother by the Portuguese; in return, he gifted the island to the Portuguese crown in 1721. However, Portuguese control was little-recognized over the region, administered under the Prazo of Mambone. The island experienced periods of drought and famine, and was frequently invaded by tribal groups known to the Portuguese as the Vatuas and Landins. The Mambone prazeiros began to use the island as a supply depot for the growing slave trade. French slave traders made raids into the area well into the 19th century. Combined with food insecurity and Landin invasions, the island was steadily depopulated, with most inhabitants becoming refugees in wooded areas along the mainland. The island was recorded as completely uninhabited by 1886.

Portuguese colonial authorities constructed a lighthouse on the northern tip of Bazaruto in 1913. At some point in the 19th century, a Tsonga band from Machanga migrated to the archipelago to escape Nguni invasions and raids. Various other mainland groups sought refuge in the islands during periods of strife. After the independence of Mozambique, it was placed under Inhambane Province. Thousands of refugees fled to the island during the Mozambican Civil War (1977–1992). Although isolated from the war, the population put an intense strain on water supplies, and imported goat stocks led to overgrazing.

Crocodile farming historically took place on Bazaruto, with a population of around 5,000 crocodiles in 1990, hatched from eggs collected inland at Cahora Bassa. It was criticized for its stressors to the protected ecosystem due to its consumption of fish and wood fuel which ultimately became economically nonviable on the island. The last crocodile farming operations were closed in 2002.

== Administration and infrastructure ==
Bazaruto is administered as part of Inhassoro District in Inhambane Province. The Bazaruto Administrative Office, the only civil administrative center in the archipelago, administers both the island itself and neighboring Santa Carolina. The island also has a police station and an elementary school, the Rural School of Estone. A clinic, the Health Station of Bazaruto, is located on the island in Zenguelemo. An unpaved airstrip is the only air transport facility on the island.

== Demographics and economy ==
The island is mainly inhabited by Xitsonga speakers, variously labeled as the Bazaruto or Mahoca. Although poverty is endemic across Inhambane, Bazaruto has fared better due to profits from fishing and tourism. An aerial census in 1990 calculated a total population of 2,576, based on an estimated 644 dwellings on the island. However, a 1995 study gave a considerably lower estimate of 1,735 people across 345 families. Dwellings and fishing camps line the sheltered western shore, with the active dunes of the east unpopulated.

Agricultural cultivation is practiced to supplement local fishing, with cassava, millet, beans, and melons as the main crops. However, agriculture is restricted by the island's sandy substrate and irregular rain. Goats and sheep are herded on the island, posing a risk to small grazing species such as the red forest duiker.

=== Economy ===
Fishing is the primary economic activity of the island, practiced both for profit and subsistence, with men, women, and children all participating in the trade. Like much of coastal Mozambique, fishermen are organized into Community Fishing Committees.

Tourist accommodations were initially established on the archipelago by Portuguese businessman Joaquim Alves. In addition to the main hotel on Santa Carolina, Alves established a facility on Bazaruto. The hotel was abandoned after Mozambican independence in 1973, but renovated around 1990 in response to increased tourism to the island. Tourist facilities mainly recruit staff from the mainland; in 2003, only 7% of full-time jobs at the island's tourist facilities were held by locals. The island's lodges sponsored the creation of the Tomba Yidhu Association in order to manage community use of tourism revenues. Bazaruto has developed a reputation as a favorable location for fishing, drawing tourists interested in recreational fishing to the island.

== Ecology ==
Fourteen species of mammals live on Bazaruto, far more than on the other islands of the archipelago. Land mammals native to the island include two antelopes (the red forest duiker and harnessed bushbuck), two primates (the blue monkey and Mohol bushbaby), the four-toed elephant shrew, and several species of shrew and rodent, including the red bush squirrel. The little free-tailed bat is the only bat species on the island. In addition to the native mammals, black rats, feral cats, and the suni antelope have been introduced to the island by human activity. A total of 32 reptile species, 10 species of amphibian, and 74 resident land birds inhabit the island.

Four species of sea turtle are known to frequent the island: green, hawksbill, loggerhead, and leatherback. Loggerhead turtles use the island as a nesting site, and reports exist of hawksbill and leatherback nesting.

The waters of the Bazaruto archipelago are a critical refuge for dugong populations, hosting the largest population of the creatures in East Africa. Although low density in comparison to populations along the coast of Australia or the Persian Gulf, the Bazaruto population may be the only viable population remaining in the southwestern Indian Ocean. Dugongs were historically hunted and eaten as a delicacy in the region.

=== Habitats ===
Mangrove swamps and salt marshes flank the island. Patches of freshwater wetland also exist, including small patches of swamp forest comprising the tree species Ficus trichopoda and smaller numbers of Syzygium cordatum, with Cyclosorus interruptus ferns as groundcover. These freshwater wetlands are used by locals for sweet potato cultivation, with slash-and-burn threatening the remaining swamp forest. The island's small freshwater lakes provide a nesting ground for wetland birds and a habitat for crocodiles. Lake Mbiti hosts a large population of Mozambique tilapia.

=== Ecological protections ===
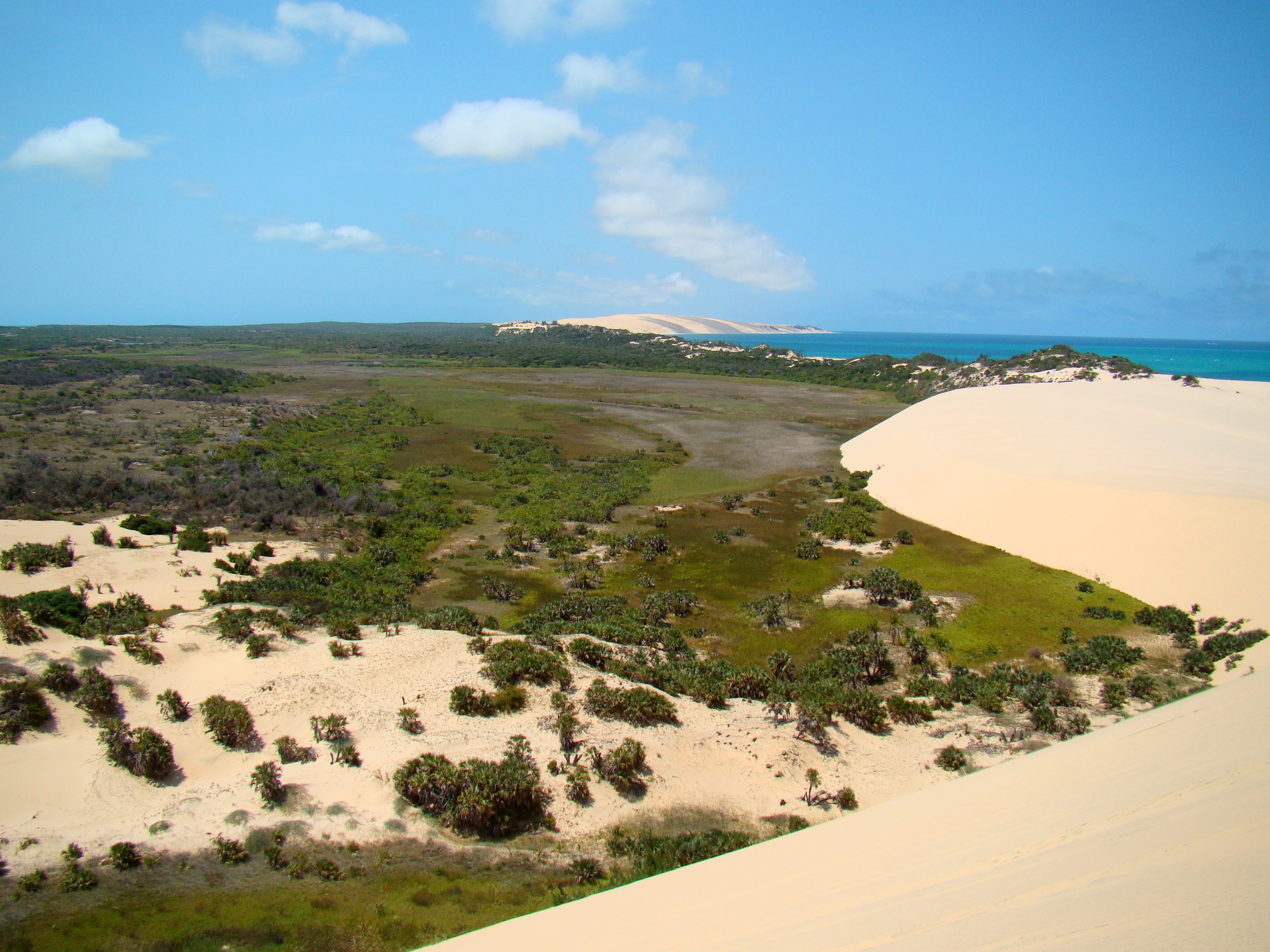
View of the eastern coast of Bazaruto from the south of the island

In 1971, the Portuguese colonial government established Bazaruto National Park in the archipelago, encompassing Benguerra, Magaruque, and Bangué and the 5 km (3.1 mi) coastal zone around the islands. Bazaruto itself was not initially incorporated into the park, although hunting was banned on the island. By 1987, proposals circulated to incorporate the island into a reserve. These were expanded into the Bazaruto Project over the following years alongside the World Wildlife Fund, with funding from the European Union. In 2001, Bazaruto became part of the reorganized Bazaruto Archipelago National Park, alongside a much wider expanse of coastal ecosystems.

Fresh water on the island is mainly groundwater sourced from sand dune aquifers. These are at risk of wastewater contamination due to their small volume.
