= Bangué =

Island in Mozambique

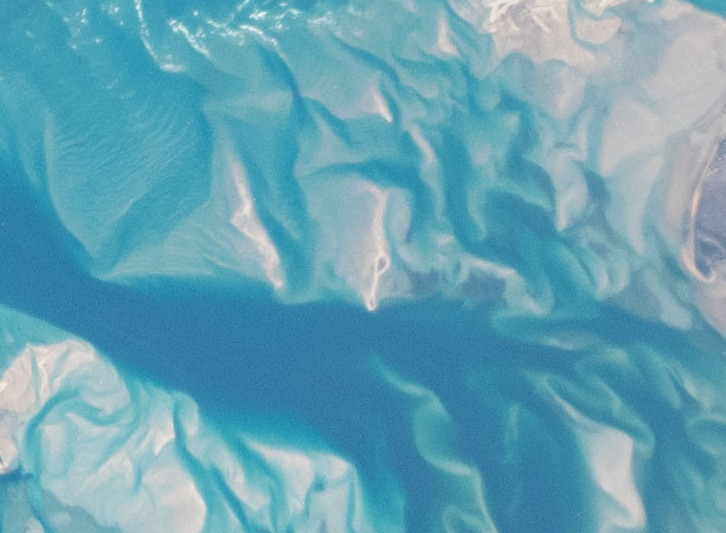
- Satellite image of Bangué

- Location within Mozambique

Geography
- Location: Mozambique
- Coordinates: 22°2′35″S 35°27′23″E
- Archipelago: Bazaruto
- Area: 5 ha (12 acres)

Demographics
- Population: No permanent inhabitants

Bangué (Portuguese pronunciation: [bɐ̃ˈɡɛ]) is a small sandy barrier island in the Bazaruto Archipelago of southern Mozambique, situated between Magaruque Island and the São Sebastião Peninsula to the south. Formed through wave action later than the other islands of the archipelago, it is a largely barren dune island with limited vegetation and no permanent inhabitants. It is occasionally visited by local fishermen and various seabirds. The islet is part of Bazaruto Archipelago National Park, and its surrounding waters form a vital habitat for dugong and sea turtles.

== Geography ==
Bangué is the smallest and southernmost island in the Bazaruto Archipelago of southern Mozambique, lying south of Magaruque Island and 5.4 kilometres (3.4 mi) north of the São Sebastião Peninsula. A narrow sandy islet, it measures 5 hectares (12 acres). Unlike the other islands, it formed through deposition of sediment by waves in the tidal delta created by the archipelago. As its creation was dependent on the existence of the chain itself, it formed much later, likely within the past 3,000–4,000 years.

=== Climate ===
The Bazaruto archipelago, like most of Mozambique, has a tropical savanna climate, designated as Aw according to the Köppen climate classification. The area experiences an annual rainfall of around 978 mm (38.5 in) and an average temperature of 24 °C (75 °F), with highs up to 30 °C (86 °F) during the summer and lows of 18 °C (64 °F) during the winter. Water temperatures in the surrounding area range from 24–28 °C (75–82 °F). Bangué lies within a high-risk area for tropical cyclone activity.

== Ecology ==
Entirely composed of sand dunes, vegetation on Bangué is limited to a small number of species which thrive on pioneer sand dunes—dunes directly adjacent to the beach. Various seabirds visit the island, including grey herons, greater flamingos, grey-headed gulls, ruddy turnstones, common sandpipers, wood sandpipers, common ringed plovers, and grey plovers. Dugong live around the island, forming the southernmost extent of the largest population in East Africa. This may be the last population viable in the long-term in the southwestern Indian Ocean. Sea turtles are also found around the island, including green, loggerhead, leatherback, and hawksbill turtles. However, turtle nesting on Bangué is disrupted by the island's high rates of erosion.

The island is uninhabited, although it occasionally hosts camps by local fishermen. Alongside Magaruque and Benguerua, it was part of the initial territory assigned to the Bazaruto Archipelago National Park in 1971.
