= Survivor South Africa: Santa Carolina =

- Season 3
- Presented by: Nico Panagio
- No. of days: 27
- No. of castaways: 18
- Winner: Perle "GiGi" van Schalkwyk
- Runner-up: Ashley Hayden
- Location: Santa Carolina, Mozambique
- No. of episodes: 14

Release
- Original network: M-Net
- Original release: 20 January – 21 April 2010

Additional information
- Filming dates: November 2009 – December 2009

Season chronology
- ← Previous; Malaysia Next → Maldives

Survivor South Africa: Santa Carolina is the third season of the South African reality game show Survivor South Africa. The season was filmed in late 2009 and aired weekly between January and April 2010 on Wednesdays nights on M-Net with the ninety-minute live season finale airing on the 21, April 2010. M-Net also commissioned a 15th episode that had a look at the whole series with retrospective views from all the contestants. Hosted by Nico Panagio (replacing previous host Mark Bayly), the program featured 18 celebrity castaways competing for 27 days. The grand prize was a R500,000 donation to the winner's chosen charity and an additional R500,000 for the winner.

The season was filmed on the small island of Santa Carolina, a member of the Bazaruto Archipelago off the southern coast of Mozambique. The castaways lived amongst white sand beaches, coral reefs and buildings left abandoned by the Mozambican Civil War, including a prison and a luxury hotel.

This season also introduced Exile Island, Tribal Kidnapping and the Hidden Immunity Idol twists, which were imported from the American edition of the show. The Hidden Immunity Idol twist was much like the first iteration of the twist (as seen in Survivor: Guatemala) in which the idol had to be played prior to the voting process.

On 21 April, it was revealed that exotic dancer and club owner Perle "GiGi" van Schalkwyk was crowned the Ultimate Survivor in a 6–3 decision over television presenter Ashley Hayden, winning R500,000 for herself and another R500,000 for her charity, a Hospice in Johannesburg.

== Contestants ==
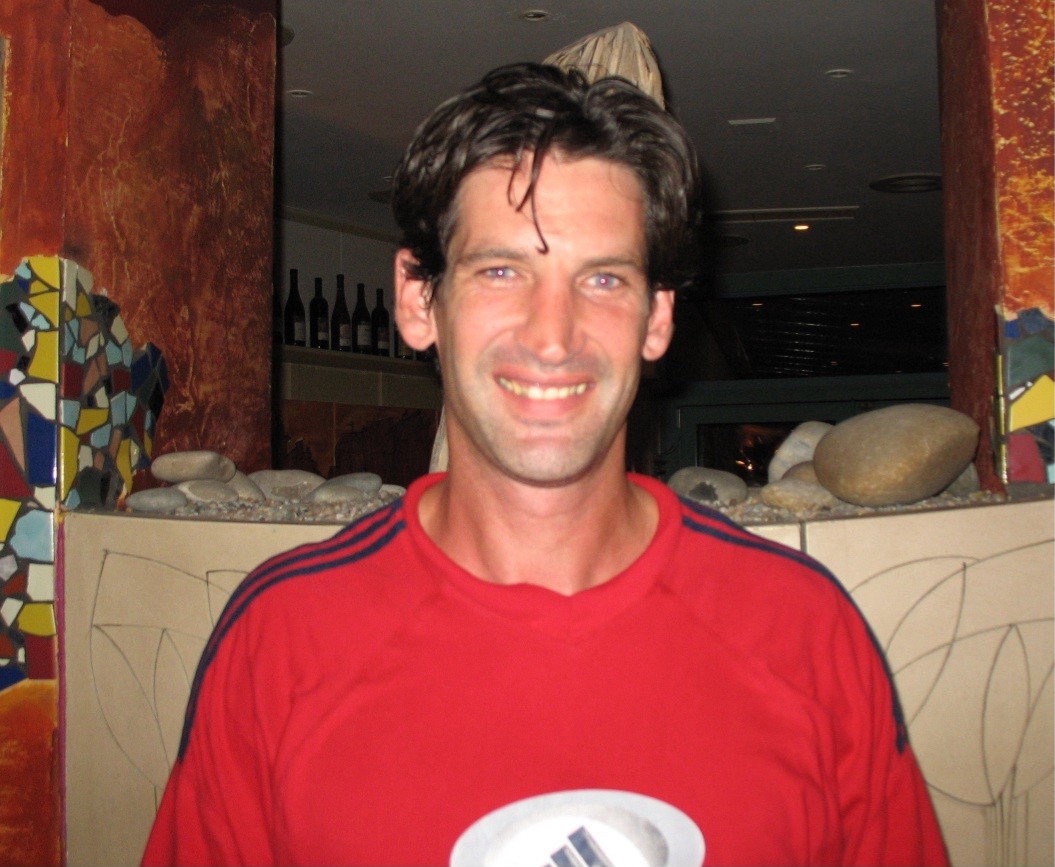
Okkert Brits

Divided into two different groups, the first group of celebrities marooned on Day 1 had to exile two of their own (they chose Kaseran and Craig) while a smaller group of celebrities were marooned on a second beach. Day 2 saw Kaseran and Craig return to be captains in a schoolyard pick of the other 16 celebrities and form two tribes: Chibudu and Timbila, after local Chopi words for "harmony" and "togetherness" respectively. After a cycle of exiles and temporary tribal kidnappings, Day 13 saw each tribe kidnap a member from the opposing tribe. Day 15 saw the 10 remaining contestants merge into the Kululama (meaning "strength") tribe. The final 10 players made up the two finalists and the eight members of the Tribal Council jury, who - alongside the South African public acting as the 9th juror in a public poll - ultimately decided which finalist would be the "Sole Survivor".

List of Survivor South Africa: Santa Carolina contestants
Contestant	Charity	Original tribe	Post-kidnap tribe	Merged tribe	Finish
Christina Storm; 35, Cape Town, Western Cape; Actress, Model	Lucinda Greyling; Help Fund	Chibudu			Quit; Day 3
Garth Collins; 43, Johannesburg, Gauteng; Actor, Comedian, Gladiator	South African Guide; Dogs Association	Chibudu			1st Voted Out; Day 3
Molemo "Jub Jub" Maarohanye; 29, Johannesburg, Gauteng; Rapper, Musician	Ithuteng Trust	Chibudu			Quit; Day 6
Cindy Nell; 28, Johannesburg, Gauteng; Miss South Africa 2002	WAG & The Chrysalis; Foundation	Timbila			2nd Voted Out; Day 6
Craig Jacobs; 35, Cape Town, Western Cape; Fashion Designer	The Trust	Chibudu			3rd Voted Out; Day 9
Lea "Lady Lea" Moscou Barrett; 29, Johannesburg, Gauteng; DJ, Music Producer	The Wet Nose Animal; Rescue Center	Timbila			4th Voted Out; Day 11
Darren Maule; 37, Johannesburg, Gauteng; Comedian, TV and Radio Presenter	Wesley Flavell; Heart Foundation	Timbila			5th Voted Out; Day 12
Sandi Schultz; 45, Johannesburg, Gauteng; Actress	RCCTT	Timbila	Timbila		6th Voted Out; Day 14
Hanna Grobler; 28, Johannesburg, Gauteng; Actress, Businesswoman	Hanna Charity and Empowerment Foundation	Chibudu	Chibudu	Kululama	7th Voted Out; 1st Jury Member; Day 15
Louw Venter; 34, Cape Town, Western Cape; Comedian	MyLifE Foundation	Timbila	Timbila	Kululama	8th Voted Out; 2nd Jury Member; Day 17
Okkert Brits; 36, Port Elizabeth, Eastern Cape; Olympic Pole Vaulter	Give Me a Chance; Foundation	Chibudu	Chibudu	Kululama	9th Voted Out; 3rd Jury Member; Day 19
Gys de Villiers; 49, Knysna, Western Cape; Actor, Voice-Artist, Sculptor	HOKISA	Chibudu	Timbila	Kululama	10th Voted Out; 4th Jury Member; Day 21
Izak Davel; 26, Johannesburg, Gauteng; Singer, Soap Actor, Model	Ons Huis Trust	Timbila	Chibudu	Kululama	11th Voted Out; 5th Jury Members; Day 23
Kaseran Pillay; 34, Johannesburg, Gauteng; Comedian	Durban Children's Home	Timbila	Timbila	Kululama	12th Voted Out; 6th Jury Member; Day 25
Sade Giliberti; 24, Johannesburg, Gauteng; TV Presenter	Childline	Chibudu	Chibudu	Kululama	13th Voted Out; 7th Jury Member; Day 26
Tebogo "ProVerb" Thekisho; 28, Johannesburg, Gauteng; Rapper, TV and Radio Presenter	Bophelo Care; Centre, Kimberley	Timbila	Timbila	Kululama	14th Voted Out; 8th Jury Member; Day 27
Ashley Hayden; 42, Johannesburg, Gauteng; TV Presenter, Businesswoman	The Homestead-Projects for Street Children	Timbila	Timbila	Kululama	Runner-Up; Day 27
Perle "GiGi" van Schalkwyk; 42, Johannesburg, Gauteng; Exotic Dancer, Businesswoman, Actress	Hospice Houghton, Johannesburg	Chibudu	Chibudu	Kululama	Ultimate Survivor; Day 27

== Season summary ==
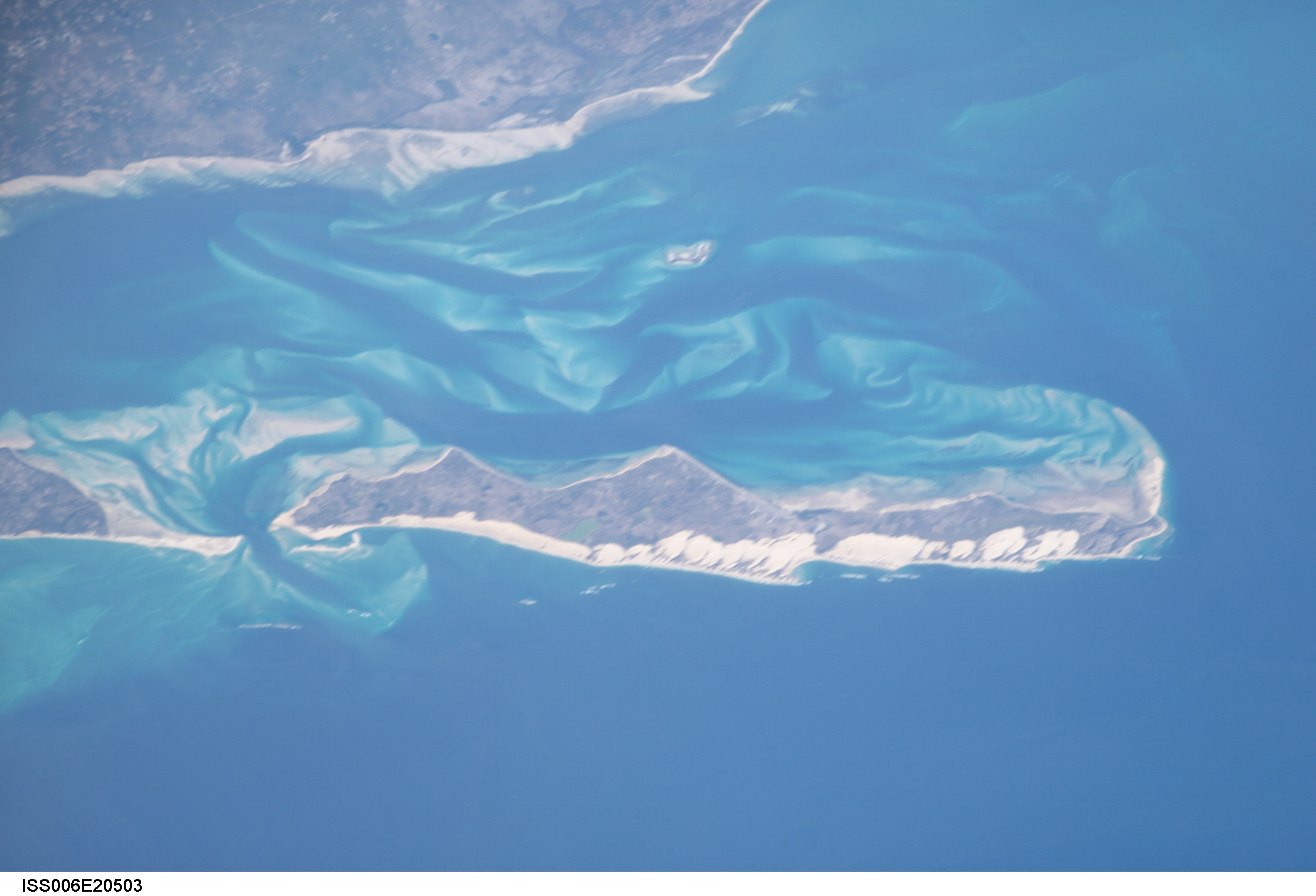
The season was filmed in Santa Carolina in Mozambique.

Day 1 saw the celebrities marooned on various beaches off the coast of Mozambique, with the larger group exiling Kaseran and Craig once they were introduced to the new host, Nico Panagio. Day 2 saw the entire cast be divided into two tribes: Chibudu and Timbila; with Kaseran and Craig performing a schoolyard pick. Chibudu were plagued with two tribe members quitting days apart, and they were also forced to vote out their strongest member due to an injury at the beginning of the game. However, they overcame the odds against the larger Timbila tribe in a majority of the challenges under the leadership of Okkert. Timbila saw a core alliance form between Ashley and Kaseran, controlling vote after vote to pick off non-alliance members.

At the merge, the original alliances were tied with 5 members each, with a tiebreaker challenge shifting the balance in favour of the Timbila alliance. However, cross-tribal relationships that formed between Izak and Okkert led to the Timbila alliance losing Louw and their majority at the next vote, due to a vote countback system in the event of tie votes. A reward challenge win by the three remaining women in the game, Ashley, GiGi, and Sade, saw a second cross-tribal alliance form; Sade and GiGi in the Chibudu alliance would vote for future targets, while Ashley's Timbila alliance would force ties to systematically eliminate as many of the physically stronger men in both alliances.

This protected all three women and Ashley's closest ally Kaseran until the final five, when Ashley had to betray the comedian for her women's alliance. At the final four, the women's alliance turned on Sade for being the youngest and strongest player left, and Ashley won a record-breaking fifth consecutive immunity challenge to secure a spot in the final two. She voted out the last remaining man in the competition, the rapper ProVerb, over the quiet former Exotic Dancer and businesswoman, GiGi. The Final Tribal Council saw the jury at odds with Ashley's deceptive strategy, with Louw and Kaseran taking Ashley's betrayals to heart. After the votes were cast, the South African audience were given an opportunity to vote for either Ashley or GiGi to receive the public's jury vote. At the reunion, while South Africa voted for Ashley, it was revealed that the jury respected GiGi's underestimated social game over Ashley's ruthless strategic prowess. Thus, GiGi was awarded the title of Ultimate Survivor in a 6–3 vote and split the grand prize with the charity of her choice. During the reunion, both Kaseran and Louw stated they no longer held resentment towards Ashley since returning to South Africa after production had ended.

Challenge winners and eliminations by episode
Episode		Challenge Winner(s)		Exiled	Kidnapped	Eliminated	Finish
No.	Original air date	Reward	Immunity	Exiled	Kidnapped	Eliminated	Finish
1	20 January 2010	Timbila		Craig (Note: Craig and Kaseran were exiled by a majority of the castaways; they were immediately taken to Exile Island with a clue to a hidden immunity idol. On Day 2, they would select their tribes once re-united with the rest of the cast.)	None	Christina	Quit; Day 3
1	20 January 2010	Timbila		Kaseran	None	Garth	1st Voted Out; Day 3
2	27 January 2010	Timbila	Chibudu	Gys	Izak	Jub Jub	Quit; Day 6
2	27 January 2010	Timbila	Chibudu	Gys	Izak	Cindy	2nd Voted Out; Day 6
3	3 February 2010	Chibudu	Timbila	None		Craig	3rd Voted Out; Day 9
4	10 February 2010	Chibudu	Chibudu	Darren	Okkert	Lady Lea	4th Voted Out; Day 11
4	10 February 2010	Chibudu	Darren (Note: Darren played an Immunity Idol, granting him immunity at this tribal council.)	Darren	Okkert	Lady Lea	4th Voted Out; Day 11
5	17 February 2010	Chibudu		None		Darren	5th Voted Out; Day 12
6	24 February 2010	Chibudu	Chibudu	None		Sandi	6th Voted Out; Day 14
6	24 February 2010	Chibudu	Gys (Note: Gys was awarded immunity for this tribal council as he was kidnapped in the earlier kidnapping twist.)	None		Sandi	6th Voted Out; Day 14
7	3 March 2010	None (Note: There was no reward challenge due to the tribal merge.)	Kaseran	ProVerb	None (Note: The Kidnapping twist was retired at the merge.)	Hanna	7th Voted Out; 1st Jury Member; Day 15
8	10 March 2010	GiGi, Kaseran, Okkert	Kaseran	None (Note: The Exile Island twist was retired at the merge.)	None	Louw	8th Voted Out; 2nd Jury Member; Day 17
9	17 March 2010	Sade [Ashley, GiGi]	Izak	None	None	Okkert	9th Voted Out; 3rd Jury Member; Day 19
10	24 March 2010	Gys	Ashley	None	None	Gys	10th Voted Out; 4th Jury Member; Day 21
11	31 March 2010	Izak [Ashley]	Ashley	None	None	Izak	11th Voted Out; 5th Jury Member; Day 23
12	7 April 2010	Kaseran	Ashley	None	None	Kaseran	12th Voted Out; 6th Jury Member; Day 25
13	14 April 2010		Ashley	None	None	Sade	13th Voted Out; 7th Jury Member; Day 26
13	14 April 2010		Ashley	None	None	ProVerb	14th Voted Out; 8th Jury Member; Day 27
14	21 April 2010					Jury vote	
14	21 April 2010					Ashley	Runner-up; Day 27
14	21 April 2010					GiGi	Ultimate Survivor; Day 27

== Episodes ==
No. overall	No. in season	Title	Timeline	Original release date
27	1	"Episode 1"	Day 1-3	20 January 2010
New host Nico Panagio instructed seven of the castaways to swim out to an island where a machete and high-tech shoes waited for them. Meanwhile, the other eleven castaways were dropped off on another part of the island with several crates of supplies labelled in Portugalise. Some crate contained survival supplies while others contained unsuitable items to the survival on the island. The group had to carry as they hiked across the sand dunes. The group of seven bonded on their journey, while the group of eleven were instructed by Nico to take their crates onto a boat destined for Santa Carolina. Nico revealed that two of those eleven would not continue with the journey, and that the group would have to cast two votes to determine which two castaways would be chosen. Kaseran and Craig received the most votes, and Nico revealed they would fly to Exile Island while the other nine would travel to camp by boat. The two groups united at their camp, while Craig and Kaseran discovered a clue to a hidden immunity idol while exiled. On day 2, Darren was put off by Jub Jub wasting water from the well to cool off, leading to a public argument between the two. At Exile Island, a note deemed Craig and Kaseran leaders, instructing them to divide the castaways into two tribes using red and blue buffs also provided to them. Craig’s leadership role began to go to his head, annoying several tribe members as Chibudu (Craig’s tribe wearing red buffs) and Timbila (Kaseran’s team wearing blue buffs) were introduced. The members of Chibudu (especially Sade and Jub Jub) were frustrated by having to set up their camp after the long first day.: Reward/Immunity Challenge: Tribe members must stay on a buoy and cross from one platform to another using an overhead rope. From there, they must swim to a tower and climb a net where six weighted bags must be untied. Then, they must swim to a guillotine where they will untie a knot and attach the six bags to open a gate that allows the castaways to swim through it. Once all tribe members are standing on the final platform after swinging on a turnstile, they can swim to shore and dig up their flagpole. The first tribe to raise their flag wins immunity and flint.; Timbila won the challenge and made fire by the end of the night. During the morning of day 3, Christina felt guilty about leaving her young daughter to partake in Survivor, ultimately deciding to quit the game before Tribal Council was to commence. Jub Jub wanted Craig out, as Craig did not contribute much at camp, while an injury to Garth's leg (due to him accidentally scraping it against a patch of coral) became infected. At Tribal Council, though Craig’s leadership was called into question, Chibudu unanimously voted out Garth due to his injury; Nico then provided flint to Chibudu, since they had gone to Tribal Council.
28	2	"Episode 2"	Day 4-6	27 January 2010
The following morning, Jub Jub complained about a rash around his genitals and a cut on his foot, but the medical team cleared him to continue in the game, telling him to keep it clean. At Timbila, Louw and Darren both wanted to be the tribe’s "alpha male", and Ashley said she didn’t trust Louw due to him making several alliances.: Reward Challenge: One harnessed tribe member must be maneuvered by the other tribe members to a pieces that build a lighthouse. The harnessed tribe member must assemble the tribe’s lighthouse, and the tribe must carry it to a marked spot on the sand. If the lighthouse falls, the tribe must re-assemble it without the help of their harnessed tribe member. The first tribe to transport the complete lighthouse to the marked spot wins fishing gear and chooses one member of the losing tribe to send to Exile Island, where a clue to the hidden immunity idol awaits them.; Timbila won the challenge and chose to send Gys to Exile Island. Gys then had to pick one member from Timbila to spend the night at the Chibudu camp, and he chose Izak. Morale at Timbila was high after winning the first two challenges, and it grew even more after Cindy found berries as a food source and the men caught some fish with their reward. Meanwhile on Exile Island, Gys’s search for the idol was delayed by the high tide and an approaching storm, though he later managed to find the idol after the storm subsided. The storm hit the Timbila camp hard, and Cindy single-handedly constructed a better shelter, to Kaseran’s admiration. On Chibudu, an angry Jub Jub decided to quit, marking the third tribe member lost despite going to Tribal Council only once.: Immunity Challenge: One "code-breaker" tribe member must correctly solve a math equation using tiles numbered 1-5 and guide their tribemates to a corresponding key; this process is repeated four times. The first tribe use their fifth key on the final lock wins immunity at the end of an obstacle course wins immunity.; Jub Jub officially quit the game, to Nico’s chagrin; despite being three numbers down, Chibudu won the challenge. Ashley grew threatened by Cindy’s perceived physical and strategic prowess, and attempted to rally votes against her. At Tribal Council, Ashley’s lobbying proved to be effective, as Cindy was voted out unanimously.
29	3	"Episode 3"	Day 7-9	3 February 2010
At Timbila, Ashley, Izak, and Kaseran agreed to be honest with each other, while Louw and ProVerb found a clam, which freaked out the latter. At Chibudu, Craig complained that he didn’t sleep as comfortably as his tribemates; he proceeded to accidentally break the tribe’s fishing hook. Treemail instructed each tribe to pick one representative that would compete in the reward challenge; Okkert and Izak were chosen for Chibudu and Timbila, respectively.: Reward Challenge: Representatives will stand on their designated side of a balance beam; the portion marked by their tribal colors marks their safe zone, where they cannot be attacked. The representatives must step forward and force their opponent off the beam. They are not allowed to hit below the knees or above the shoulders, and they cannot use their hands. The first to do so three times wins a treasure chest of food for their tribe.; Okkert won the duel, 3-1, for Chibudu. Nico offered Okkert a note instead of the food (which would go to Timbila if Okkert took the note), but Okkert stuck with the food reward. Izak was disappointed in himself for losing, while at Chibudu, Craig ate more of the food for himself. Several Timbila members agreed to vote out Darren next.: Immunity Challenge: Tribes must appoint one male and one female to be weight bearers, and the other members will choose one of the opposing weight bearers to add to until they drop the weight and are out of the challenge. The last person left standing wins immunity for their tribe.; Timbila won immunity. Several of the Chibudu members wanted to vote out Craig, who searched for the idol. At Tribal Council, Craig called out his tribe for appointing Hanna as a weight-bearer, as he felt that GiGi would have been a better option. Ultimately, Craig was unanimously voted out.
30	4	"Episode 4"	Day 10-11	10 February 2010
At Timbila, Lady Lea felt like nobody was noticing her contributions at camp, so she tried to catch some fish, but was unsuccessful. At Chibudu, Gys felt comfortable in his alliance with Okkert, Hanna, and Sade, but he considered making a move against the tribe’s biggest perceived threat in Okkert.: Reward Challenge: Three tribe members must use a catapult to send a coconut toward a target. The tribe to do this in the fewest shots wins the round, and the first tribe to win two rounds wins a surprise reward.; Chibudu won the challenge and chose to exile Darren, who chose for Okkert to be kidnapped by Timbila. Chibudu’s reward was a visit from Malaysia competitor Hein Vosloo, who had an extra all-in-one tool for them. This initially drew mixed response from the Chibudu women, as they had hoped for a food reward, but Gys was more open to having Hein at their camp. Thanks to Hein’s visit, Chibudu caught more fish. On Exile Island, Darren was excited about being by himself for a day, and his happiness grew upon finding an idol clue.: Immunity Challenge: Tribes will row their boat to a platform with a hole in the middle; castaways will swim down that hole and loosen puzzle pieces to load back onto the boat. Tribes will row with their puzzle pieces back to the beach, where they will solve a fish puzzle. The first tribe to correctly complete their puzzle wins immunity.; Chibudu won immunity. Sade and Hanna were a tight duo, which worried Okkert. At Timbila, Darren attempted to search for the idol but was befuddled by the ambiguity of the clue. He eventually found the idol. Ashley was torn between voting out Lady Lea or Darren, while ProVerb was annoyed by Darren’s constant strategizing. At Tribal Council, Darren played his idol, making him safe from the votes. However, he was the only one to vote against Sandi, while the rest of the tribe voted out Lady Lea (her vote against ProVerb was not revealed at Tribal Council).
31	5	"Episode 5"	Day 12	17 February 2010
Okkert’s leadership and efficiency at catching fish put Chibudu at a new high, but Sade felt alienated due to being the only one not fluent in the Chopi language. At Timbila, Darren worried about his position in the tribe, as he did not take to the social aspect as well as the others. The tribe agreed that Darren had to go next. Treemail revealed that the next challenge was for reward and immunity simultaneously.: Reward/Immunity Challenge: Tribes must appoint one member to swim out to a raft. Once they make it onto the raft, the rest of the tribe will pull on a rope to bring that tribe member to shore. The raft contains pieces used to assemble a ladder. Once the ladder is assembled, all tribe members must make their way up the ladder and use the machete to chop through a rope. The first tribe to do so wins immunity and chickens.; Chibudu won the challenge. Okkert wanted to eat the chickens right away, which didn’t sit well with animal lover Hanna. At Timbila, Louw recognized Darren as a threat, since he knew the game better than the others. Louw began to grow paranoid, while Ashley told Kaseran that Louw had conspired against him before. Darren pleaded for his life in the game to several tribemates, while Louw worried about whom to make a secondary target if Darren were to play another idol. At Tribal Council, no idols were played, and Darren was unanimously voted out.
32	6	"Episode 6"	Day 13-14	24 February 2010
ProVerb missed his family, and Timbila considered voting him out if they were to visit Tribal Council again.: Reward Challenge: Tribe members will compete to take control of both boats, but any deliberately violent contact will result in Nico pulling the responsible castaway from the challenge. If more than 50% of a castaway’s body is submerged in the water, they are out of the challenge. The tribe with the last player standing and controlling both boats wins pillows, a mosquito net, and a hammock.; With one extra member, Timbila had to sit out a man to make it fair, gender-wise. ProVerb sat out, and Chibudu won reward thanks to Okkert’s strength. The members of Timbila objected to Okkert’s methods in the challenge, with Louw going on a tirade at camp. Treemail instructed both tribes to send one representative to the opposing tribe, where they will select one tool and one castaway to bring to their own camp, effectively making two castaways switch tribes. Louw arrived at Chibudu, whose members hid their tools and attempted to get Louw to take something of less value. This led to Louw arguing with Gys and taking one of the tribe’s chickens. Okkert arrived at Timbila, where the exchange went more smoothly. Gys became a Timbila member, and Louw immediately interrogated him over Chibudu hiding their tools.: Immunity Challenge: Three tribe members at a time (of equal genders) will work together to push a large ball into their opponent’s goal zone, with individuals choosing whether to defend or attack. The first tribe to two points wins immunity.; Izak was revealed as a Chibudu member, and during the challenge, Okkert angered Louw even further with light contact during the round they faced off. Chibudu won their fifth straight challenge. ProVerb felt certain he would be the next to go, but Ashley and Kaseran preferred for Sandi to go, since they felt they could trust ProVerb more. They agreed not to tell Louw about the plan. Kaseran told Gys and ProVerb about the plan, but the way he told ProVerb made the rapper disbelieve him. At Tribal Council, Sandi was unanimously voted out.
33	7	"Episode 7"	Day 15	3 March 2010
Sade began to grow weary and hoped the next challenge wouldn’t be too physical. The next treemail note confused the castaways, and upon arriving at the challenge site, Nico instructed them to individually rate each of their tribemates on a scale of 1-10 (1 being the strongest and 10 being the weakest); they had to do this in secret. The placements in order were: Okkert, Louw & Izak (tie), Gys, Hanna, Kaseran, Sade, Ashley, GiGi, and ProVerb. Nico then announced the Chibudu and Timbila tribes were no more, and that all the castaways would merge into the Kululama tribe (wearing black buffs). As the designated weakest player, ProVerb would be given instructions upon arriving at the merged tribe’s camp, and the other castaways were treated to a feast. ProVerb was given a clue to an idol, but he was unable to find it before the rest of the tribe arrived at camp. Gys and Izak reunited with their respective original tribes, and Sade was comfortable sticking with her old Chibudu tribemates. They learned from Okkert that Louw would be their first target, while Izak and Kaseran agreed on targeting Sade from Chibudu. Okkert was paranoid over the possibility that the girls from Chibudu had their own agenda, while Ashley told Izak, Kaseran, and ProVerb to not choose any of their alliance members for any rewards, as Ashley wanted to make Chibudu members feel comfortable with their standing in the tribe so that they would be blindsided.: Immunity Challenge: Castaways have ten seconds to memorize a series of symbols, then they must replicate the symbols. The castaway with the highest score after a series of elimination rounds wins immunity.; Kaseran won the first individual immunity challenge of the season. Timbila decided to target Hanna, while Chibudu attempted to sway Izak to their side to avoid a tie. At Tribal Council, Izak stayed with his Timbila tribemates, forcing a 5-5 tie between Hanna and Louw. Though ties would normally be resolved by vote countbacks, the Kululama tribe had not been to Tribal Council before, so Hanna and Louw both had no votes against them at Kululama Tribal Councils. Thus, they had to compete in an elimination challenge.: Elimination Challenge: Hanna and Louw must count to 30 in their head; when they think 30 seconds have passed, they must place their hand on a skull. The person closest stays in the game, while the loser is eliminated.; Louw beat Hanna, who became the first member of the jury.
34	8	"Episode 8"	Day 16-17	10 March 2010
Timbila had a 5-4 majority, and Sade was upset about losing her friend and ally.: Reward Challenge: Randomly divided into three teams of three, team members must work together to transport a large ball from one stand to the other, with each one carrying a third of the weight. If the ball falls, they must start over. The first team to transport the ball wins a brunch.; GiGi, Kaseran, and Okkert won reward. Okkert attempted to sway Kaseran to his side to give Chibudu the majority back, encouraging him to make a move to shake up the game, but Kaseran wouldn’t budge. Okkert and GiGi then asked Kaseran who Timbila would target next, and Kaseran told them it was a toss-up between the two of them. Back at camp, Louw was concerned about Kaseran’s loyalty and attempted to convince Ashley to align with Izak over Kaseran. Timbila targeted Okkert for elimination due to him being the biggest perceived threat out of the Chibudu members. Treemail on day 17 came with letters from each castaway’s chosen charity, as a reminder to why they are playing the game.: Immunity Challenge: Castaways will search through a box of sand for their slingshot and ammunition. Once they have that, they will fire at plates to break them. The first to completely break three plates wins immunity.; Kaseran won immunity. Louw and Okkert’s rivalry continued, this time over the fish they caught. Izak did not want to vote out Okkert, as he respected him, while GiGi and Sade played both sides. At Tribal Council, Kaseran said he hadn’t been approached by any former Chibudu members, leading to Okkert bringing up their reward conversation from earlier. Kaseran made the point that Chibudu had to change the game if they wanted to stay in it, since Timbila would stick together. At the vote, Izak voted against Gys, while the others stayed loyal to their respective original tribes, forcing a 4-4 tie between Louw and Okkert. Though Okkert had no prior votes against him, Louw’s five votes from the last Tribal Council sent him to the jury.
35	9	"Episode 9"	Day 18-19	17 March 2010
Reward Challenge: Sade won reward and chose Ashley & GiGi to join her. On reward, the three women devised a sub-alliance that would allow the three of them to eliminate the remaining men in the game. While Sade and GiGi would vote with the Chibudu men, Ashley and the Timbila men would create deadlock ties. As vote countbacks were the tie-breakers for the season, alternating men from both original Chibudu and Timbila tribes would end up in the jury instead of the three women.: Immunity Challenge: Izak won immunity and decided he was comfortable voting for Okkert at the convincing of Ashley and Kaseran. At Tribal Council, as the two original tribes were level with four members in each alliance, another deadlock tie occurred, this time between Okkert and ProVerb. With the men in both alliances none the wiser to the women's plans, Okkert's previous votes against ProVerb's lack of votes led to the Olympian joining the jury.
36	10	"Episode 10"	Day 20-21	24 March 2010
Reward Challenge: Gys won reward.: Immunity Challenge: Ashley won immunity. At Tribal Council, Gys was sent to the jury.
37	11	"Episode 11"	Day 22-23	31 March 2010
Reward Challenge: Izak won reward and chose to share it with Ashley.: Immunity Challenge: Ashley won immunity. At Tribal Council, a three-way tie occurred; GiGi, Izak, and Sade each had two votes. The two women did not have any votes against them before this Tribal Council, but Izak had one, sending the soap actor to the jury.
38	12	"Episode 12"	Day 24-25	7 April 2010
Reward Challenge: Kaseran won reward.: Immunity Challenge: Ashley won immunity again. She was the swing vote between the women's alliance (GiGi and Sade) or her old Timbila tribemates (Kaseran and ProVerb). At Tribal Council, Ashley sided with the women to send her old ally Kaseran to the jury.
39	13	"Santa Carolina Finale"	Day 26-27	14 April 2010
Immunity Challenge: Ashley won her fourth straight immunity challenge. At Tribal Council, Sade was sent to the jury.: Immunity Challenge: Ashley won her fifth straight immunity challenge, and she had the power to take either GiGi or ProVerb to the end of the game, eliminating whoever she didn’t choose. At Tribal Council, Ashley chose to eliminate ProVerb and face the jury with GiGi. The South African audience was given an opportunity to vote between Ashley and GiGi; the castaway with the public's majority would receive a jury vote.
40	14	"Santa Carolina Reunion"	N/A	21 April 2010
The Live Reunion hosted in South Africa with the cast, excluding Jub Jub due to a criminal case laid upon him while the season was airing, where the winner was announced. It was revealed that the public's jury vote was awarded to Ashley. It was not enough, as GiGi was crowned Ultimate Survivor in a 6-3 vote.
41	15	"Santa Carolina Highlights"	N/A	28 April 2010
After the Santa Carolina finale and reunion, the entire cast except for Jub Jub were invited back to look back at the highlights of the season.

== Voting history ==
	Exile vote (Note: On Day 1, the 18 castaways were spllit into two groups. The Group of 11 were tasked to vote out two members of their group, with each castaway casting 2 votes. Kaseran received 10 votes (being voted upon by everyone else), and Craig received 4 votes. The two were exiled for a day, and tasked with dividing the cast into two tribes. Votes are in alphabetical order.)		Original tribes							Swap (Note: The castaway who was kidnapped by the tribe that attended the next tribal council was declared immune from being voted out. Timbila kidnapped Gys, while Chibudu kidnapped Izak. When Timbila lost the immunity Challenge, Gys became immune.)	Merged tribe											
Episode	1				2		3	4	5	6	7		8		9		10	11		12	13	
Day	1		3		6		9	11	12	14	15		17		19		21	23		25	26	27
Eliminated	Craig	Kaseran	Christina	Garth	Jub Jub	Cindy	Craig	Lady Lea	Darren	Sandi	Tie (Note: The Tribal Council vote resulted in a tie. Per the rules, a Tribal Council countback was called with votes from previous Kululama Tribal Councils being accounted for. However, as this was Kululama's first Tribal Council and no Kululama votes have been cast, a tiebreaker challenge occurred instead.)	Hanna	Tie (Note: The Tribal Council vote resulted in a tie. Per the rules, a Tribal Council countback was called was called with votes from previous Kululama Tribal Councils being accounted for.)	Louw (Note: Okkert received no votes from earlier Kululama Tribal Councils while Louw received five, eliminating him from the game.)	Tie	Okkert (Note: ProVerb received no votes from earlier Kululama Tribal Councils while Okkert received four, eliminating him from the game.)	Gys	Tie	Izak (Note: GiGi and Sade received no votes from earlier Kululama Tribal Councils while Izak received one, eliminating him from the game.)	Kaseran	Sade	ProVerb
Votes	10–4–3–2–1–1–1		Quit (Note: No Vote; Christina chose to quit the game.)	7–1	Quit (Note: No Vote; Jub Jub chose to quit the game.)	8–1	5–1	6–1–1	6–1	5–1	5–5	Challenge (Note: A tiebreaker challenge between Hanna and Louw occurred at Tribal Council. Hanna lost and was eliminated from the game.)	4–4–1	Countback	4–4	Countback	3–2–1–1	2–2–2	Countback	3–2	3–1	1–0
Voter	Vote																					
GiGi	Garth	Kaseran		Garth			Craig				Louw		Louw		ProVerb		Kaseran	Izak	0 Votes	Kaseran	Sade	None (Note: GiGi and ProVerb were not eligible to vote as the only eligible players they could vote for were each other.)
Ashley	Kaseran	Louw				Cindy		Lady Lea	Darren	Sandi	Hanna		Okkert		Okkert		Gys	GiGi		Kaseran	Sade	ProVerb
ProVerb						Cindy		Lady Lea	Darren	Sandi	Hanna		Okkert		Okkert	0 Votes	Izak	Sade		Sade	Sade	None
Sade				Garth			Craig				Louw		Louw		ProVerb		Kaseran	Izak	0 Votes	Kaseran	ProVerb	
Kaseran	Craig	GiGi				Cindy		Lady Lea	Darren	Sandi	Hanna		Okkert		Okkert		Gys	GiGi		Sade		
Izak	Craig	Kaseran				Cindy		Lady Lea	Darren		Hanna		Gys		Okkert		Gys	Sade	1 Vote			
Gys				Garth			Craig			Sandi	Louw		Louw		ProVerb		ProVerb					
Okkert	Jub Jub	Kaseran		Garth			Craig				Louw		Louw	0 Votes	ProVerb	4 Votes						
Louw	Craig	Kaseran				Cindy		Lady Lea	Darren	Sandi	Hanna	Won	Okkert	5 Votes								
Hanna				Garth			Craig				Louw	Lost										
Sandi						Cindy		Lady Lea	Darren	ProVerb												
Darren						Cindy		Sandi	Louw													
Lady Lea	GiGi	Kaseran				Cindy		ProVerb														
Craig	Kaseran	Louw		Garth			Hanna															
Cindy						Kaseran																
Jub Jub	Kaseran	Okkert		Garth																		
Garth	Craig	Kaseran		Jub Jub																		
Christina	GiGi	Kaseran																				

Jury vote
Episode	14	
Day	27	
Finalist	GiGi	Ashley
Votes	6–3	
Juror	Vote	
ProVerb		Ashley
Sade	GiGi	
Kaseran	GiGi	
Izak		Ashley
Gys	GiGi	
Okkert	GiGi	
Louw	GiGi	
Hanna	GiGi	
South Africa (Note: The South African public was given the chance to vote for a finalist to win the game by means of internet and/or text message voting. Ashley received the most votes, giving her one jury vote.)		Ashley
