= Inhassoro =

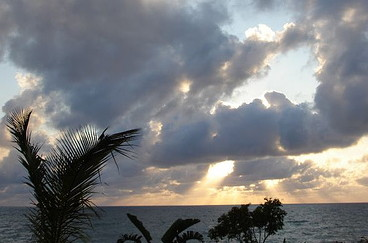
- Sunset at Inhassoro, Mozambique

- Location within Mozambique
- Coordinates: 21°32′S 35°12′E
- Country: Mozambique
- Provinces: Inhambane Province
- District: Inhassoro District

Population (2007 census)
  - Total: 11,297

Inhassoro is a small fishing port in Inhassoro District of Inhambane Province in Mozambique. The town has 11,297 inhabitants and is located on the Indian Ocean coast along the EN1 highway.

Inhassoro, which looks out at Bazaruto and Santa Carolina or Paradise Island is a developing tourist town. The population of Inhassoro is growing steadily as a result of the increase in tourism. Several old hotels date back to colonial times.

The bay off Inhassaro is popular with scuba divers with the reefs and the area is a seasonal home to many species of dolphin, turtle, the rare and endangered dugong or sea cow, whale sharks, manta rays and humpback whales.
