= Mochlus lanceolatus =

Conservation status
- Least Concern (IUCN 3.1)

Scientific classification
- Kingdom: Animalia
- Phylum: Chordata
- Class: Reptilia
- Order: Squamata
- Suborder: Scinciformata
- Infraorder: Scincomorpha
- Family: Lygosomidae
- Genus: Mochlus
- Species: M. lanceolatus

Binomial name
- Mochlus lanceolatus (Broadley, 1990)

Synonyms
- Lygosoma lanceolatum Broadley, 1990

Species of lizard

Mochlus lanceolatus, also known as Broadley's writhing skink, is a species of skink. It is endemic to Mozambique and found in the Bazaruto Archipelago and the adjacent mainland (northern tip of the San Sebastian Peninsula). It inhabits dune thicket habitats at elevations below 25 m (82 ft). The known range falls entirely within protected areas (Bazaruto Archipelago National Park and Vilanculos Coastal Wildlife Sanctuary).
