= Izak Davel =

South African actor and model (born 1983)

- Born: Izak Davel; 1 July 1983 (age 43); South Africa
- Education: Tshwane University of Technology
- Occupations: Actor, musician

Izak Davel (born 1 July 1983) is a South African actor, singer, dancer and male model. He matriculated at the Lady Grey Arts Academy in 2001 after which he proceeded to study dance at the Tshwane University of Technology and finished his studies in 2004.

He has participated in many works in theatre and played Scab on the soap opera Egoli from 2006 until its finale in 2010. He appeared on the third season of Survivor South Africa in 2010 where he became well known for wearing only a red speedo and currently plays Bradley Haines on the SABC 3 soap opera Isidingo

Davel was approached by the music promoter Stephen Stewart, who is known for his marketing and publicity of Rina Hugo, Sonja Herold, Manuel Escorcio, Juanita du Plessis and Lieflinge and contributed to sales of over 500 000 albums sold. Davel launched his singing career with the release of his debut album, Ken Jy My? in 2008.

== Theatre appearances ==
- The Tshwane Dance Season
- The Sleeping Beauty
- The Rite of Spring
- Pippin
- The Queen Show
- Best of the Boys
- Joseph
- Life at Centre
- Jesus Christ Superstar

== Filmography ==
=== Television ===
- Egoli (2006–2010)
- Survivor South Africa: Santa Carolina (2010)
- Getroud Met Rugby (2011)
- Isidingo (2013–)
- Binnelanders (2019)
- Reënboogrant (2025)

=== Film ===
- Getroud Met Rugby: Die Onvertelde Storie (2011)
- Platteland (2011)
- Hoofmeisie (2011)

== Discography ==
=== Ken Jy My? (2008) ===
Produced by Stephen Stewart and Werner Beukes

- Ken jy my
- Stuur my 'n email
- Jy's my DJ
- Petrol vir my vuur
- My verstaan
- Limmm Boe
- Is jy in of uit?
- Sal jy bly?
- Vir altyd
- Langpad
- Skerwe van glas
- 1000 Uur
- Terug na my
- Laat my lewe (saam met Jo-mari)
