= Santa Carolina =

Island in Mozambique

Nickname: Paradise Island
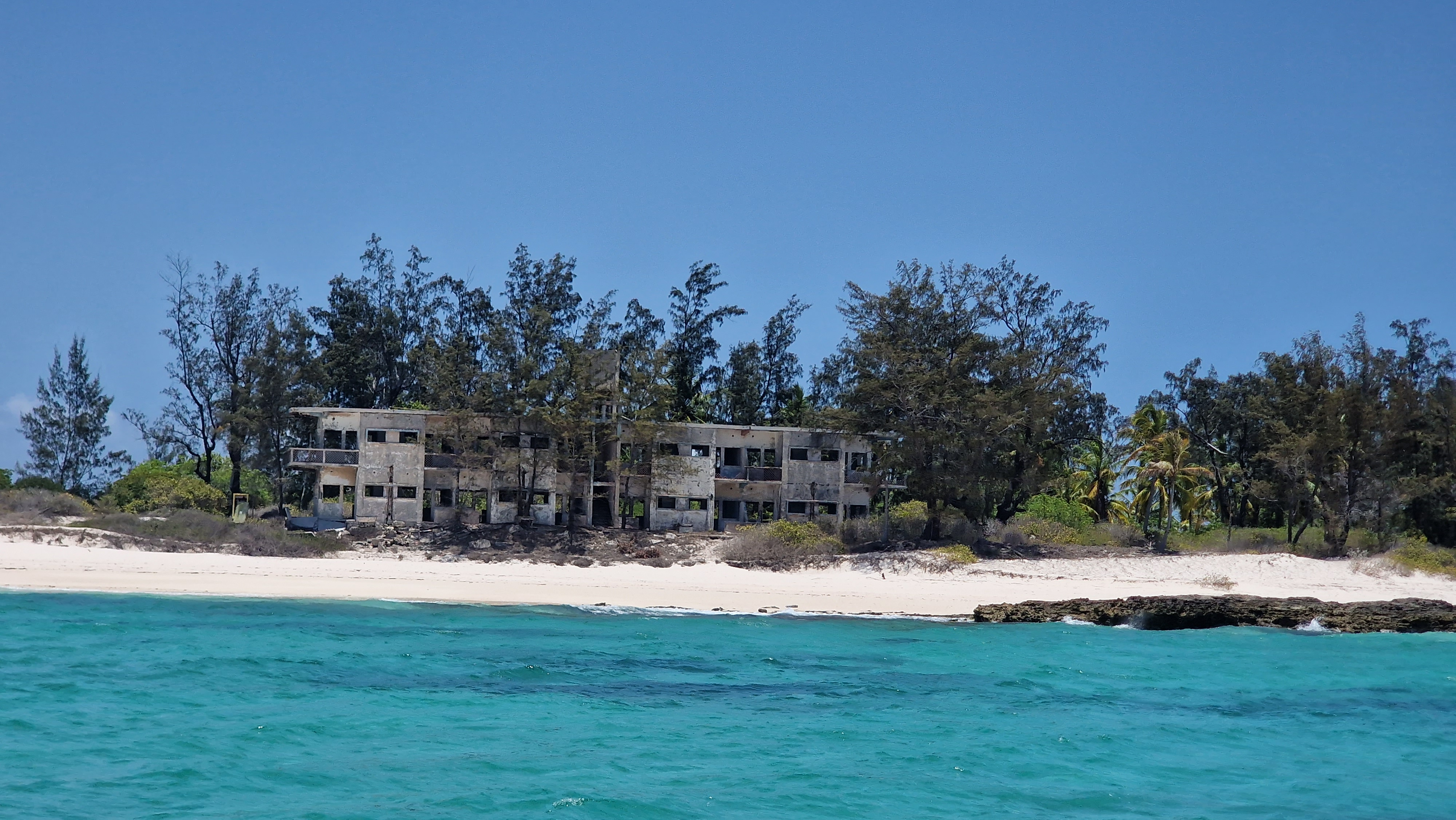

- Santa Carolina in Mozambique

Geography
- Location: Indian Ocean
- Coordinates: 21.619°S 35.341°E
- Archipelago: Bazaruto Archipelago
- Length: 2 mi (3 km)
- Width: 0.3 mi (0.5 km)

Administration
- Mozambique
- Province: Inhambane
- District: Inhassoro

Santa Carolina (Portuguese pronunciation: [ˈsɐ̃ta kaɾoˈlina]) is an island between the Mozambican mainland and Bazaruto Island in Mozambique. The closest town is called Inhassoro. It is just 2 by 0.3 miles (3.22 km × 0.48 km) in size. Santa Carolina is a true rock island with deep channels. Santa Carolina has three beaches with coral reefs close to the shore. The island, also known as Paradise Island, is regarded as the ‘gem’ of the islands forming the Bazaruto Archipelago which is a proclaimed marine national park.

== Abandoned hotel ==
There is a ruined hotel on the island. It was built in the 1950s by Portuguese businessman Joaquim Alves, who abandoned the hotel when Mozambique gained independence in June 1975. The hotel was made up of 10 buildings with a combined 250 rooms. Alves also built a chapel on the island.

The hotel was maintained by its staff for two decades after Alves abandoned it, and it was bought by South African developer Richard Makin in 1993, who planned to renovate and reopen the hotel. Makin's ownership of the island was disputed when he tried to sell the island in 1997.

The hotel was supposedly frequented by famous guests while it was still in use, but the reliability of these stories is uncertain. For example, several travel sites claim that Bob Dylan wrote his song Mozambique in the restaurant of the hotel, a story which conflicts with claims that the song was a competition between Dylan and co-writer Jacques Levy to rhyme as many words as possible with "Mozambique".

== Gallery ==
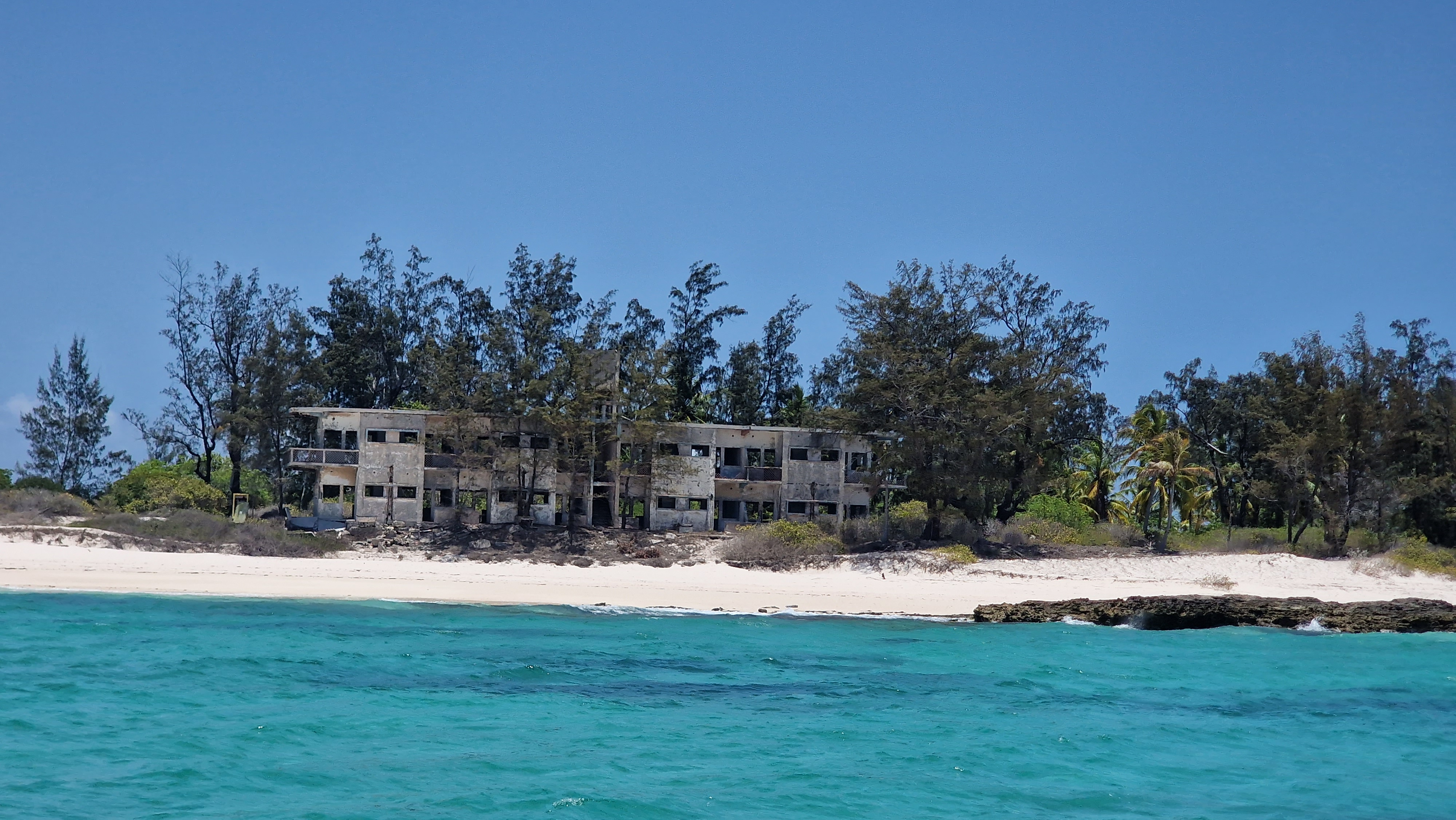
The abandoned hotel

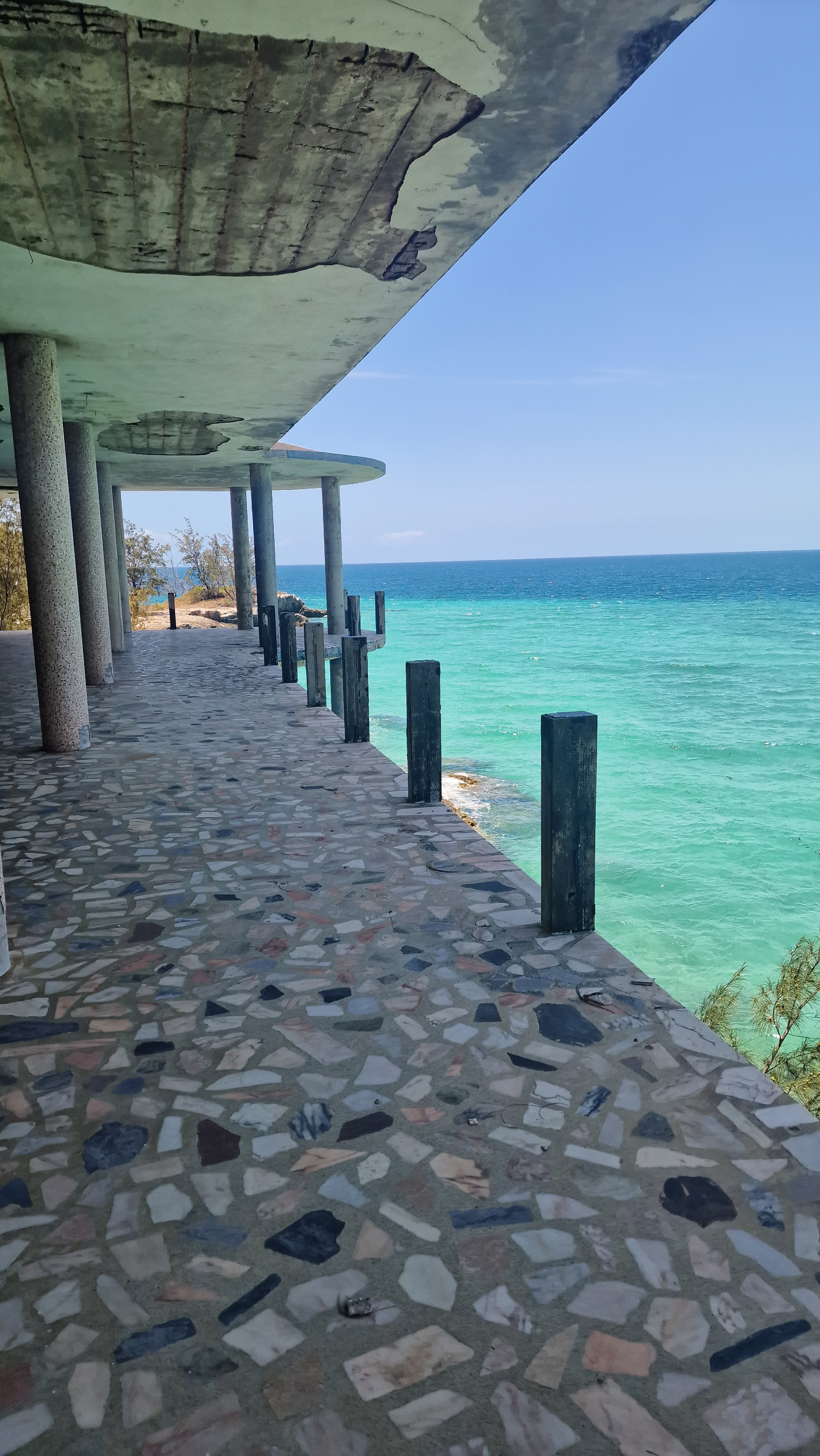
Inside the abandoned hotel

== Appearance on Survivor ==
The island was used for season 3 of Survivor South Africa (titled Survivor South Africa: Santa Carolina).
