= Bazaruto Archipelago =

Group of six islands in Mozambique

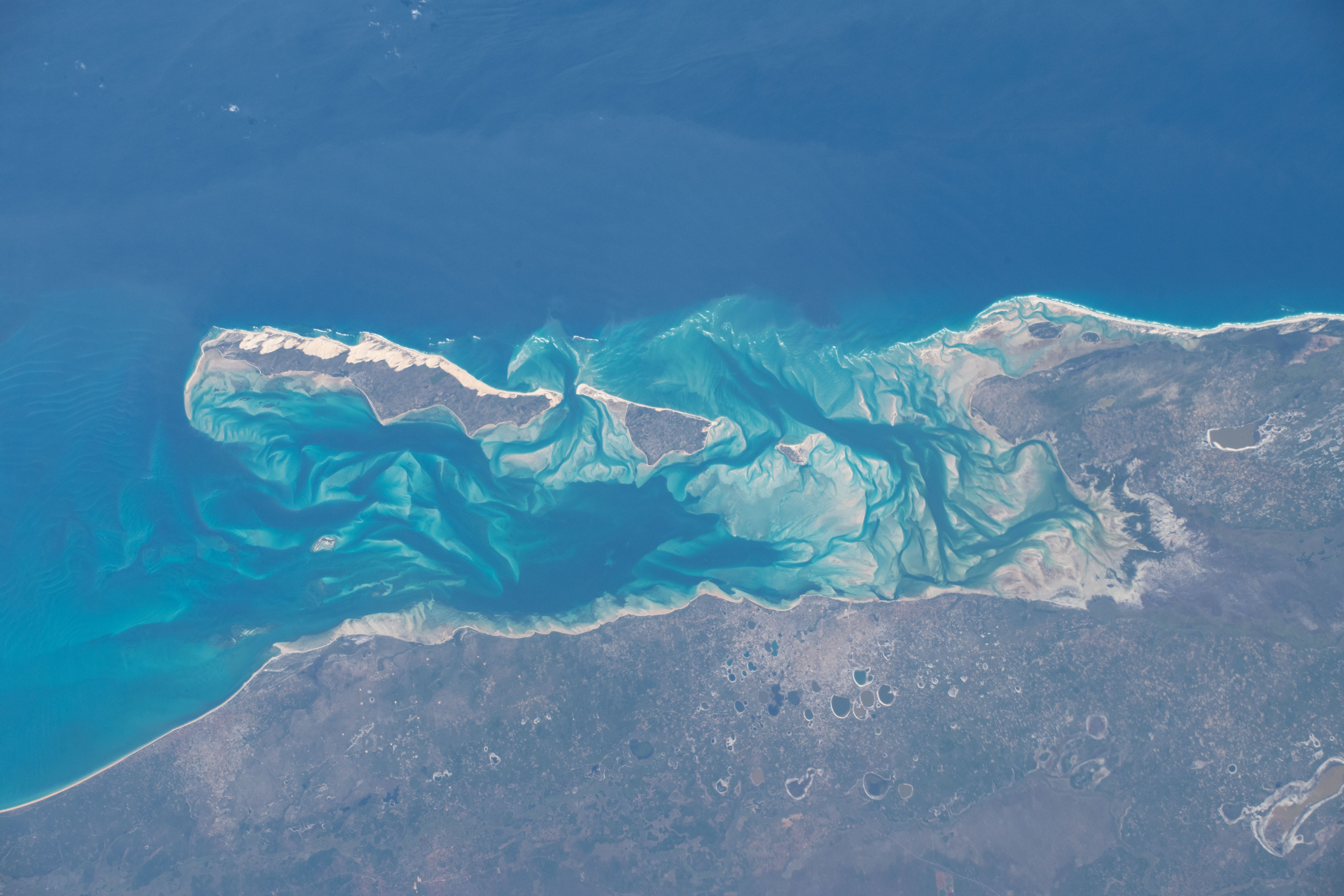
- Satellite image of the archipelago

- Location within Mozambique

Geography
- Location: Indian Ocean
- Coordinates: 21°45′S 35°27′E
- Total islands: 6

Administration
- Mozambique

The Bazaruto Archipelago (Portuguese pronunciation: [bazaˈɾutu]) is a group of six islands in Mozambique, near the mainland city of Vilankulo. It comprises the islands of Bazaruto, Benguerra, Magaruque, Santa Carolina and Bangué.

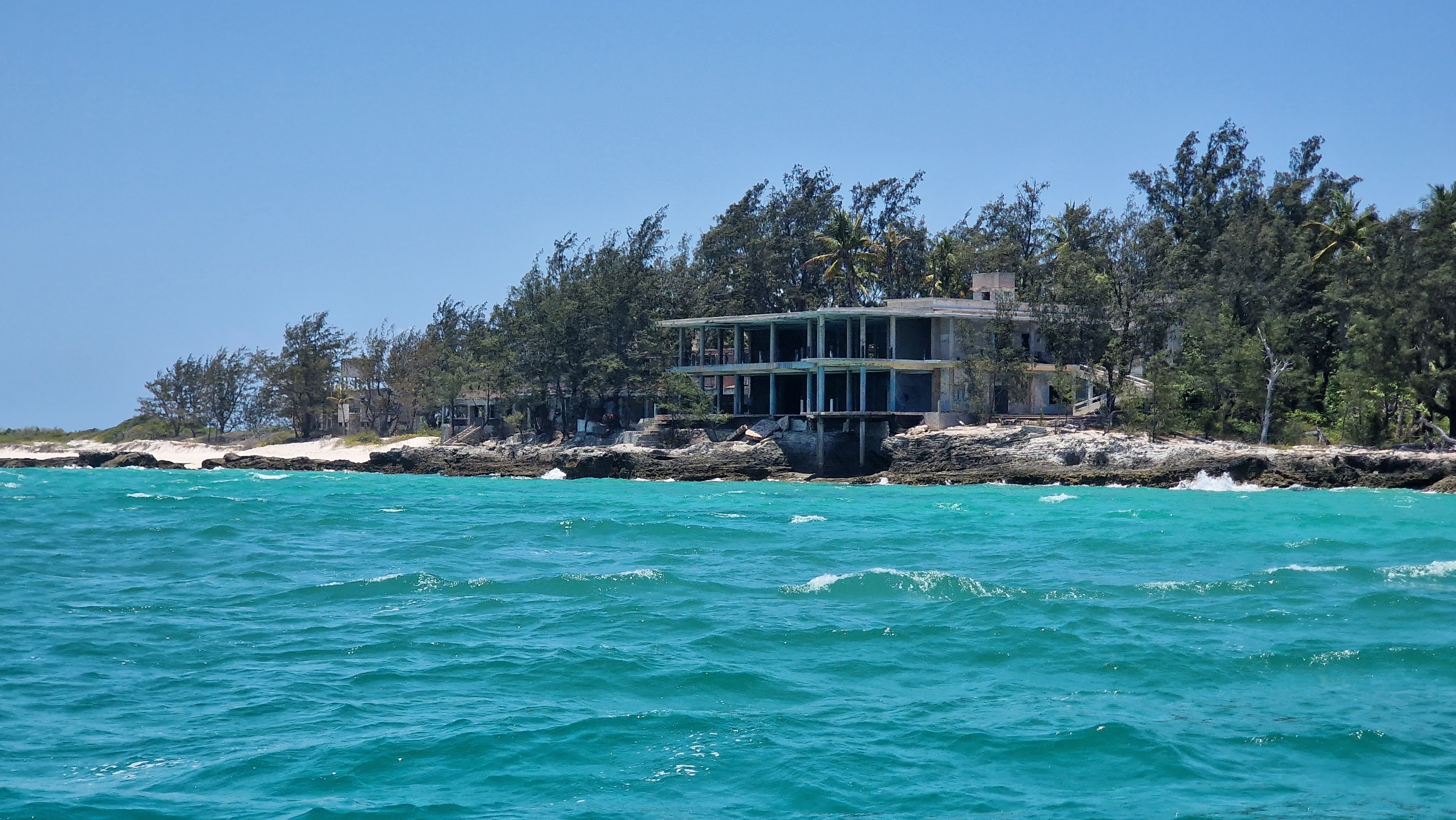
Aerial view of Santa Carolina Island

== Geography ==
Traditional wooden fishing boat on the sandy shoreline of Bazaruto Island, Mozambique

The group belongs to the Vilanculos and Inhassoro districts of Inhambane Province. The islands were formed from sand deposited by the Save River, which has since shifted its course.

Santa Carolina is a true rock island with deep channels and is just 3 by 0.5 kilometres (1.86 by 0.31 mi) in size. It has three beautiful beaches with coral reefs close to the shore. The island, also known as Paradise Island, is regarded as the "gem" of the islands forming the Bazaruto Archipelago, which is a proclaimed marine national park.

Tourist attractions include sandy beaches, coral reefs, and opportunities for surfing and fishing.

== Ecology ==
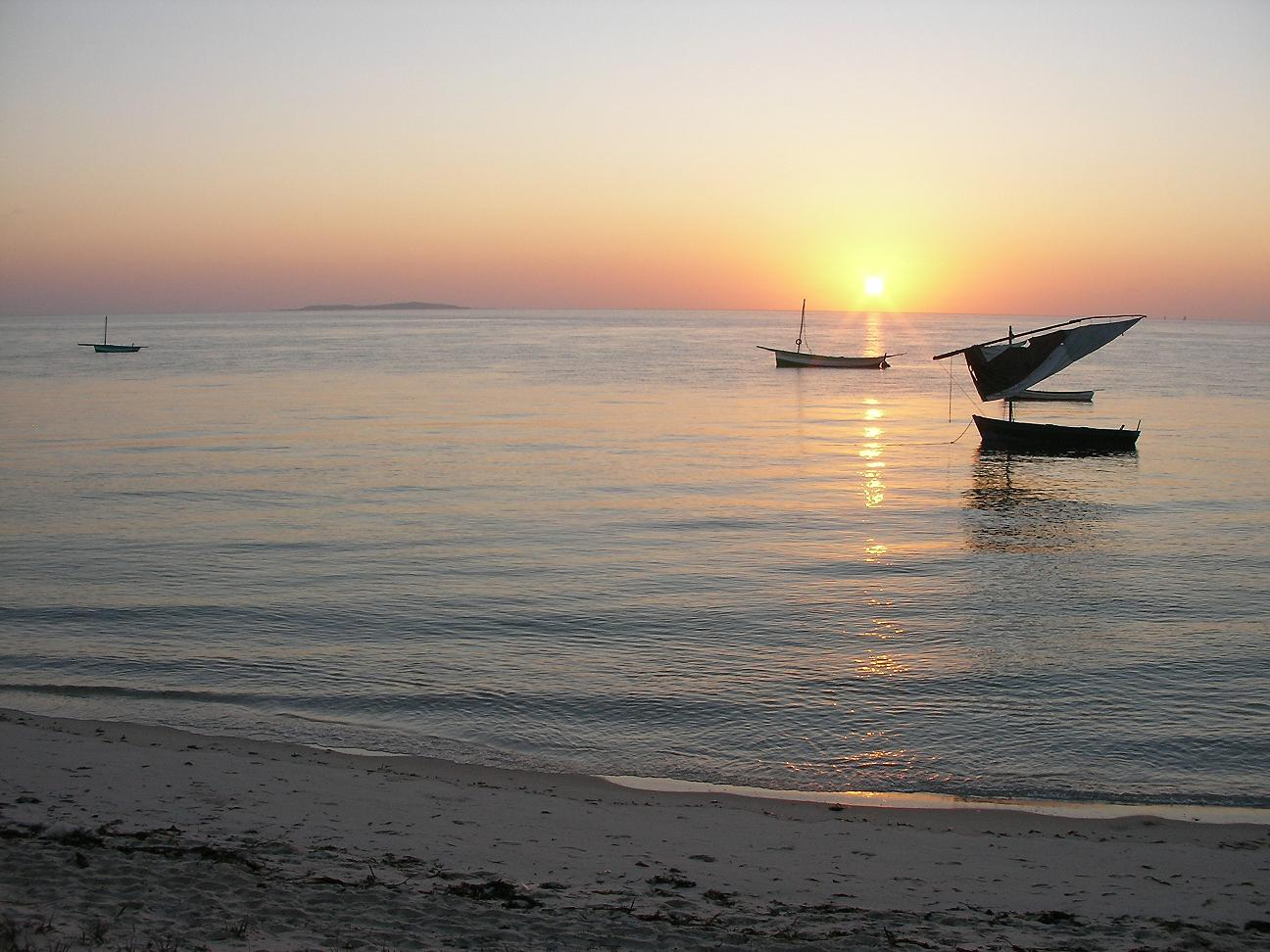
View east from mainland of dhows and an island

The archipelago became a National Park in 1971. There is a wide abundance of reef fish, surgeon fishes, Moorish idols, parrotfishes, angelfishes, and butterflyfishes to name but a few. Sea turtles, game fishes and devil rays are regularly seen. Various endangered marine megafaunas are present, such as whale sharks, mantas, leatherback sea turtles, cetaceans including humpback whale, and the dugongs. There are also flamingos, pelicans and other wild birds. Bazaruto's dugong population counts about 120 individuals, making it the largest of remnant populations in Mozambique. Bazaruto also supports a substantial population of crocodiles.

Cetacean biodiversity was previously much richer than today before being reduced by human activities, including illegal mass hunts by the Soviet Union and Japan during the 1960s to 1970s, resuling in the elimination or reduction of many species such as the southern right whale. Since the archipelago's geography provides a number of different ecosystems, an unusual variety of species to occur within a relatively small area. Bazaruto and Benguerra are the two largest islands in the archipelago.

The skinks Scelotes duttoni, Scelotes insularis, and Lygosoma lanceolatum are endemic to the Bazaruto Archipelago.

== History ==
It has been speculated that the Bazaruto Archipelago may be the island named Crocodile (Sūsmār in Persian) mentioned in the 11th-century Egyptian Book of Curiosities. This island is the last place in a list of sites along the East African coast known to Egyptian merchants and is the fifth stop after Kilwa.
