= Bazaruto Archipelago National Park =

Marine and terrestrial protected area in the Bazaruto Archipelago in Mozambique

- IUCN category II (national park)
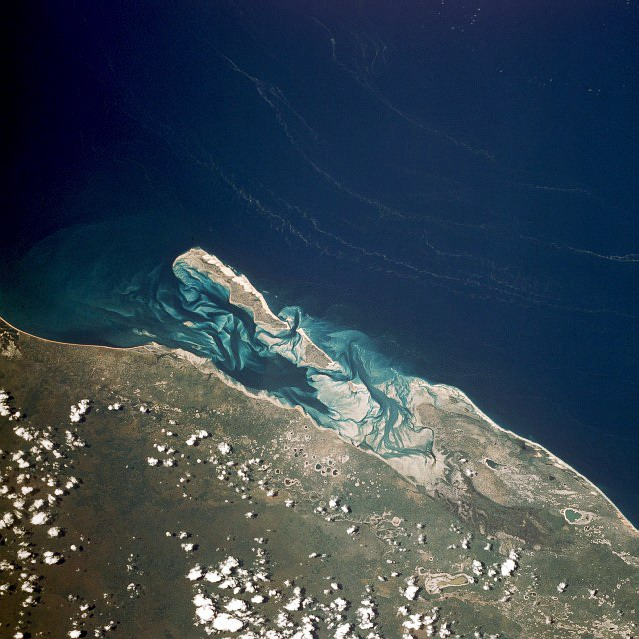
- Satellite view of the park

- Location within Mozambique
- Location: Mozambique
- Coordinates: 21.665724°S 35.465927°E
- Area: 1,430 km^{2} (550 sq mi)
- Established: May 25, 1971

The Bazaruto Archipelago National Park (BANP) is a protected area in the Inhambane Province of Mozambique on the Bazaruto Archipelago. The park was proclaimed on 25 May 1971. It is off the coast of the Vilanculos and Inhassoro districts, covering a large expanse of ocean and five islands.

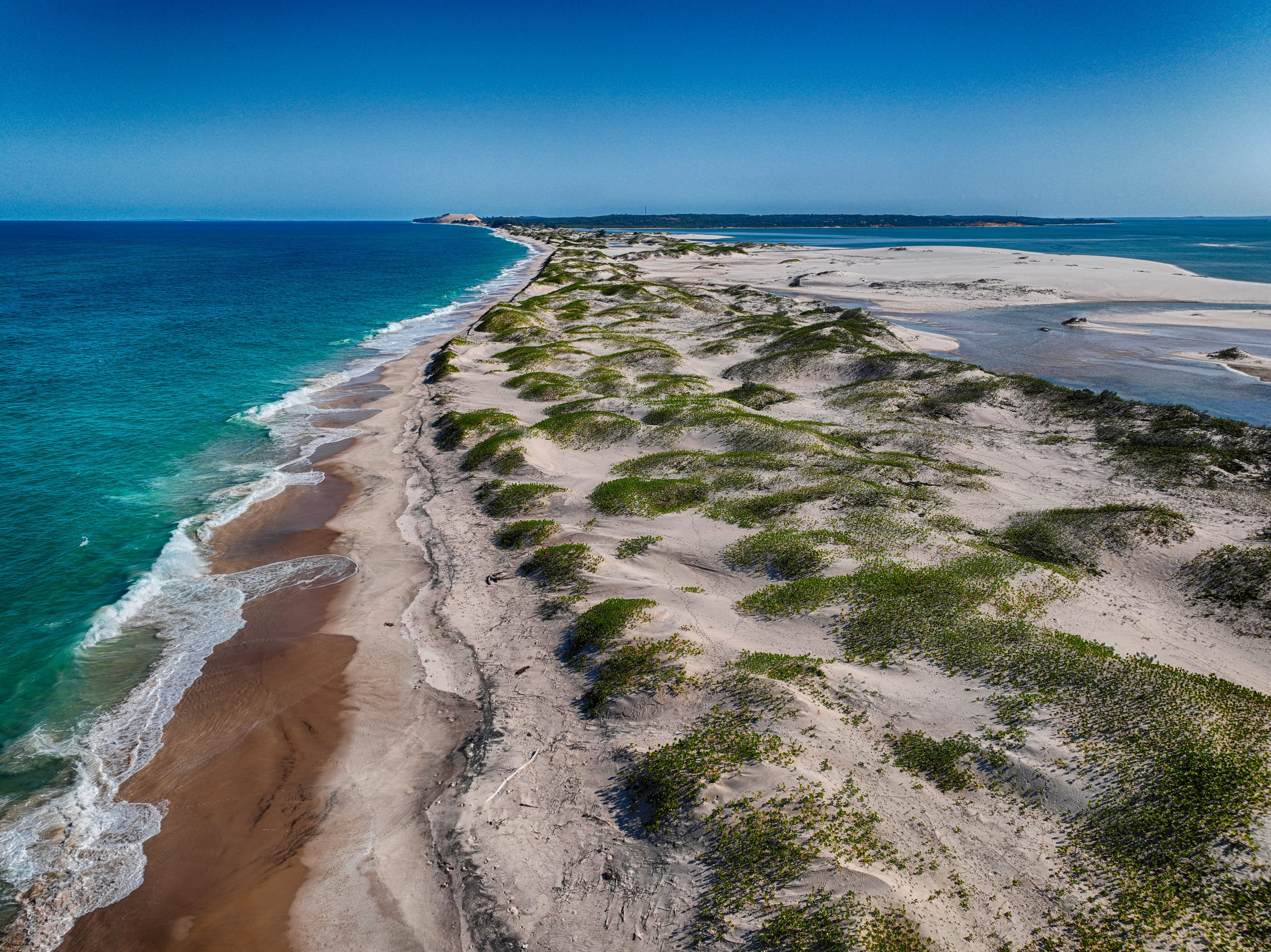
Aerial view of Benguerra Island

== Location ==
The Bazaruto National Park was inaugurated in 1971. It consists of an archipelago of five islands off the Mozambican coast between Vilankulo and Inhassoro. The park was created to protect dugong and marine turtles, and their habitats. The islands' flora and fauna, coral reefs and marine birds were also included. The largest island of the archipelago is Bazaruto Island and the others are Benguerra, Margaruque, Santa Carolina (Paradise Island), and Banque.

== Ecology ==
The islands have a lush tropical climate and include huge dunes, forest and savannah, inland lakes and wetlands. They host several endemic terrestrial gastropods and lizards, as well as important aggregations of Palaearctic migrant water birds. There are over 240 varieties of birds. These include the coucal, crab-plover, and sea eagle.

The rich variety of marine life includes marine turtles, six species of dolphins, marlins and barracudas. The open ocean has superpods of dolphins and humpback whales can be seen in the winter months. Whale sharks can be seen between October and April. There are over 2,000 species of fish and 500 mollusc species. All five regional turtle species nest here, making it the only known place in the western Indian Ocean where this happens. Inland freshwater lakes are home to crocodiles.

The BANP gives protection to the largest and the only remaining viable population of dugongs in the Western Indian Ocean. In 2022, they were listed as "critically endangered" on the IUCN Red List for East Africa. Additionally the park protects Rhino rays, like the guitarfish and wedgefish. These have been listed as one of the world's most threatened marine fishes. In 2019,the IUCN listed 15 species as "critically endangered".

The coral reefs are varied and said to be the least disturbed in this part of the Indian Ocean.

== People ==
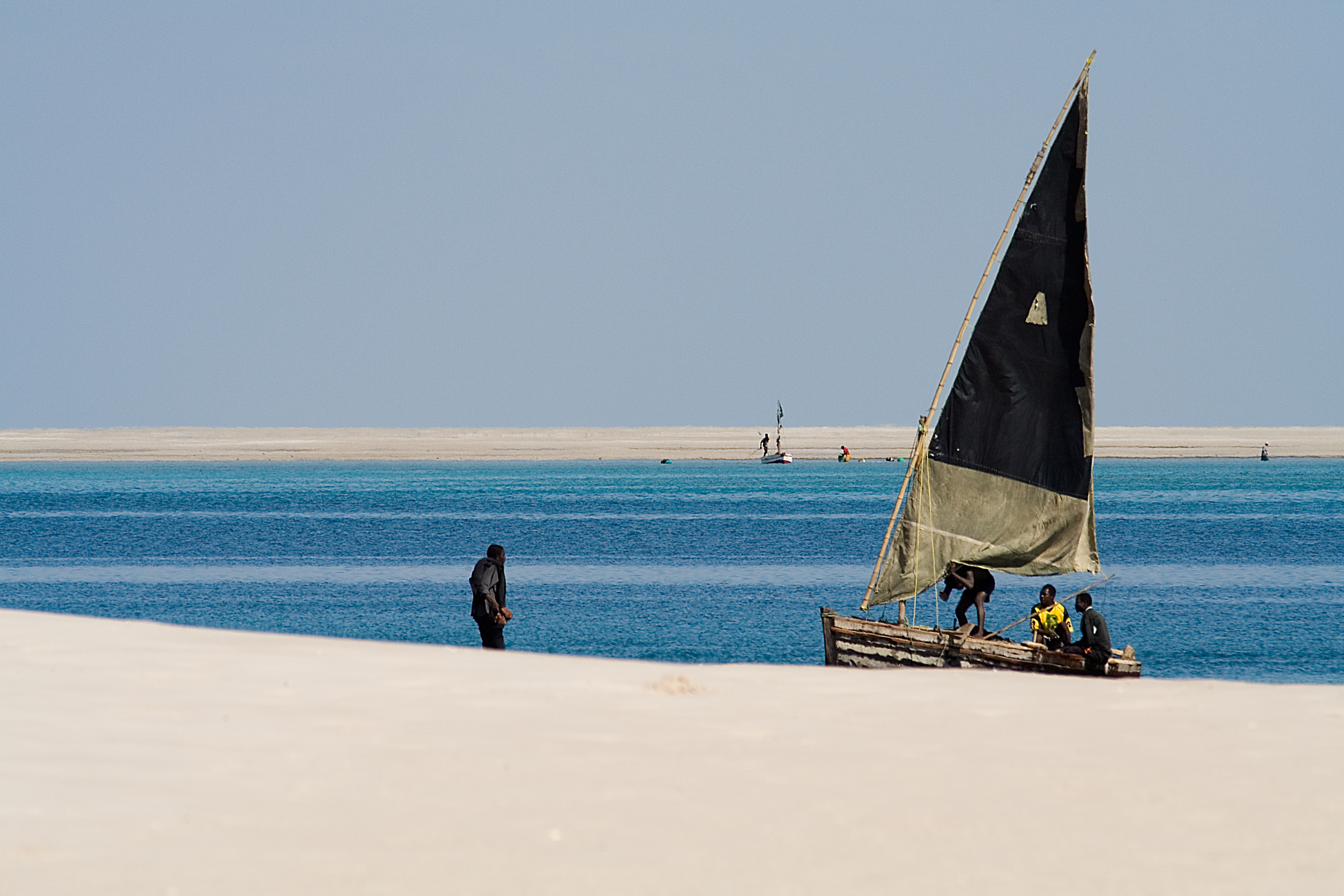
Dhow and fishermen on Magaruque Island, Mozambique, August 2006

The archipelago had about 6,500 residents in 2024 in seven communities. Only 3 of the islands are inhabited. They are mostly very poor and rely on harvesting natural resources to survive. 70% of households rely on small-scale fishing to survive, while others harvest sand oysters and other marine resources, grow crops and raise livestock. Resources may not be sufficient to maintain the population, leading to decreased catches of fish, reduced harvests and increasing poverty and food insecurity. Jobs developed after African Parks began management have positively impacted the economy.

== Conservation and Tourism ==
The archipelago experienced illegal fishing practices as well as overuse of natural resources. Additionally there was poaching and poorly regulated tourism activities. This threatened the area's biodiversity. Fishing practices and pollution are two reasons for the decline of the dugong population. Both destroy the seagrasses dugong depend on for food.

The BANP is a popular tourist destination. The 30 metre water clarity and rich coral life draw divers and snorkellers. Like mainland Mozambique, the beaches have soft white sand attracting beach lovers. As of 2011, the park had five hotels promoting high-value, low-impact programs. The hotels make an important contribution to the local economy through employment and tax revenues. The World Wide Fund for Nature (WWF) has a program to help the local communities to become more sophisticated in realizing a share of revenues in return for protecting valuable ecological resources. Since 2019, infrastructure has improved and the economy, through conservation-led practices, has created jobs.

In December 2017, management of the park passed to African Parks. They co-manage with Mozambique's National Administration of Conservation Areas.
