= Magaruque Island =

Island off the coast of Mozambique

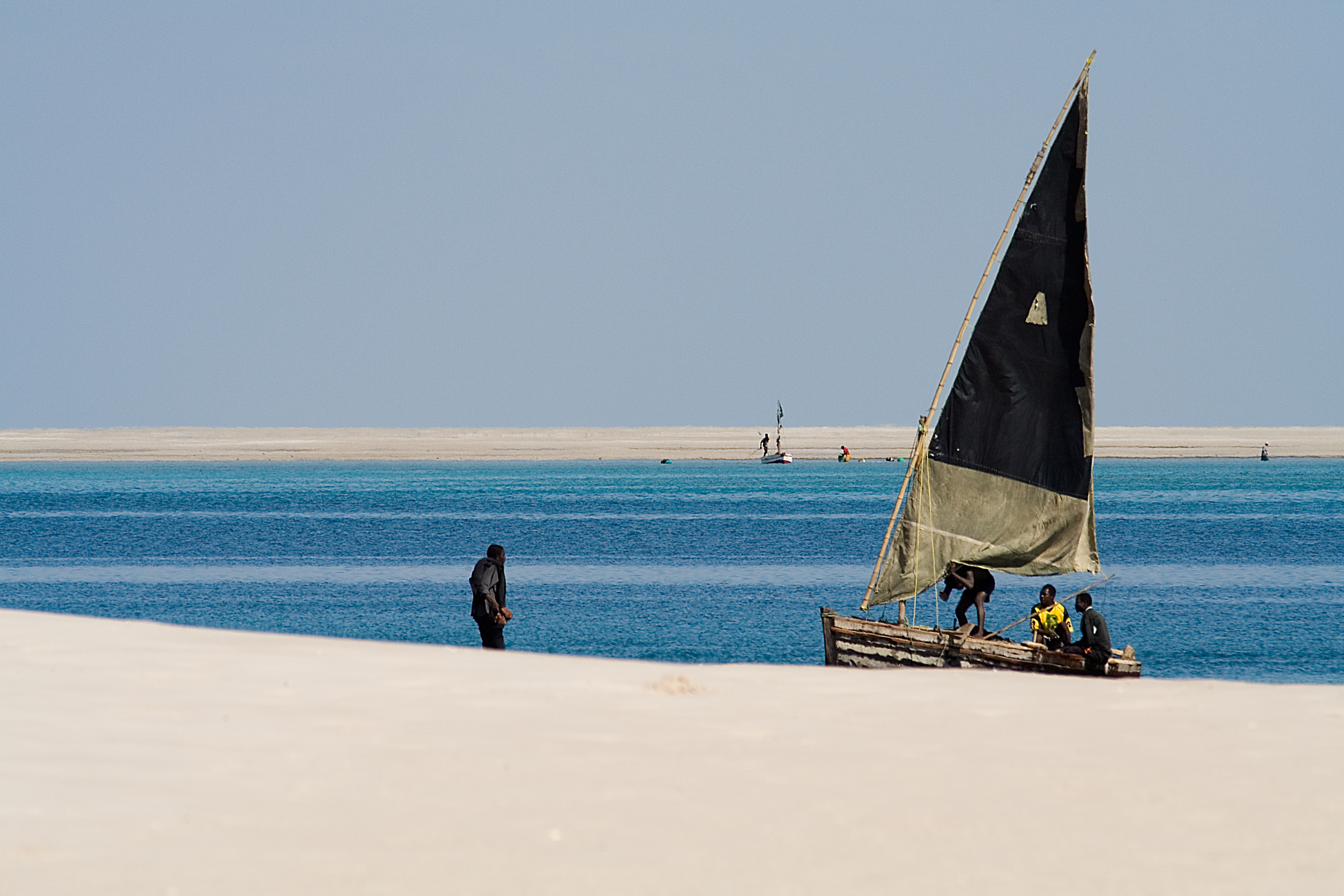
- Dhow and fishermen on Magaruque Island, August 2006

- Location within Mozambique

Geography
- Coordinates: 21°57′59″S 35°25′49″E
- Archipelago: Bazaruto Archipelago
- Area: 2 km^{2} (0.77 sq mi)

Administration
- Mozambique

Magaruque Island (Portuguese pronunciation: [maɡaˈɾukɨ]), formerly Ilha Santa Isabel, is part of the Bazaruto Archipelago, off the coast of Mozambique. It is located 5.6 kilometres (3.5 mi) south of Benguerra Island, and 9.9 kilometres (6.2 mi) east of Ponta Chuè on the mainland of Mozambique.

The island is 2.4 kilometres (1.5 mi) long north-south, and up to 1.0 km (0.62 mi) wide. Its area is less than 2 km^{2} (0.77 sq mi).
