= Benguerra Island =

Island in the Bazaruto Archipelago of southern Mozambique

Santa Antonio
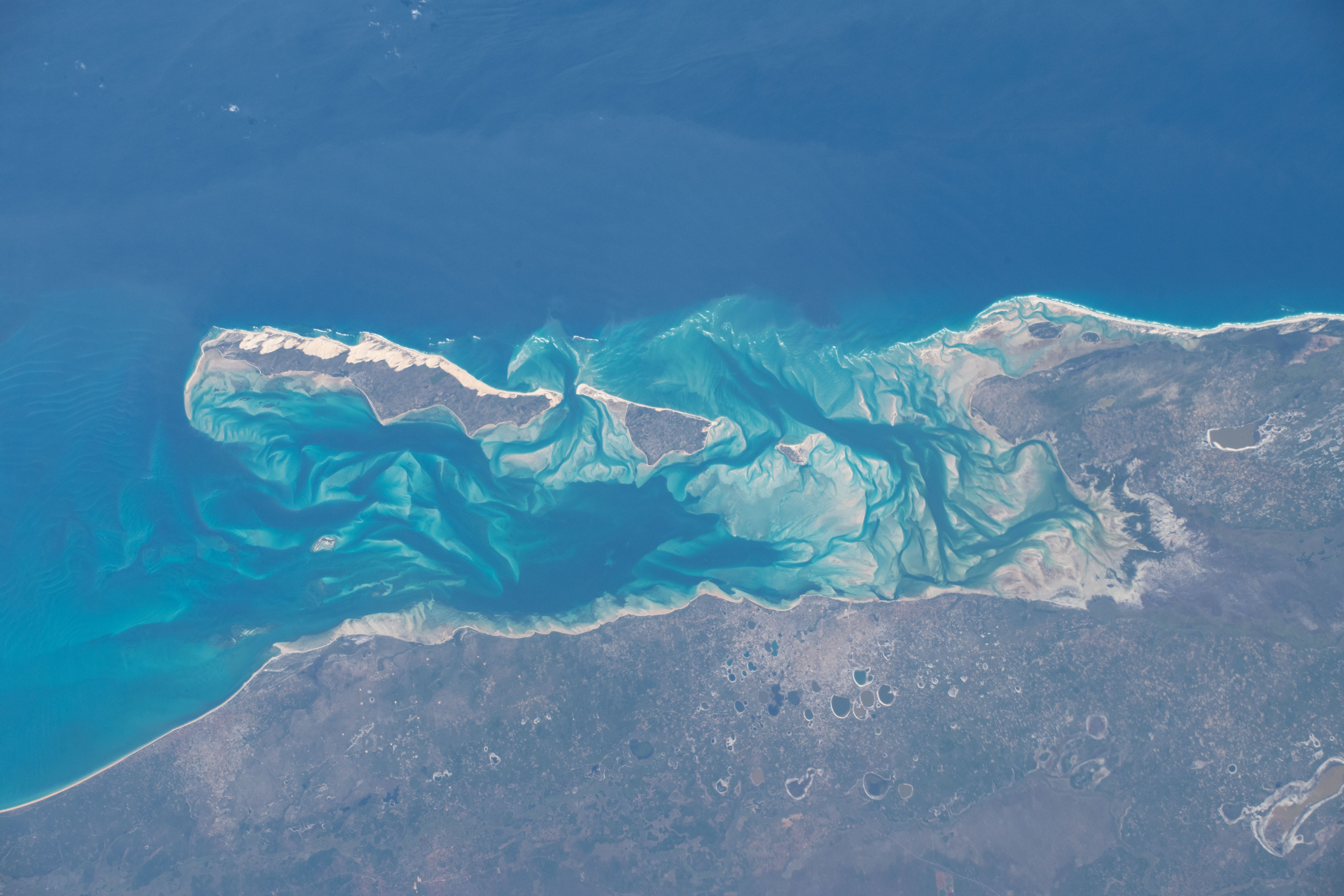
- Bazaruto Archipelago (Benguerra center, to the right of Bazaruto island)
- Interactive map of Benguerra Island

Geography
- Location: Indian Ocean
- Coordinates: 21°51′59″S 35°26′24″E
- Archipelago: Bazaruto
- Area: 55 km^{2} (21 sq mi)
- Length: 11 km (6.8 mi)
- Width: 5.5 km (3.42 mi)

Administration
- Mozambique

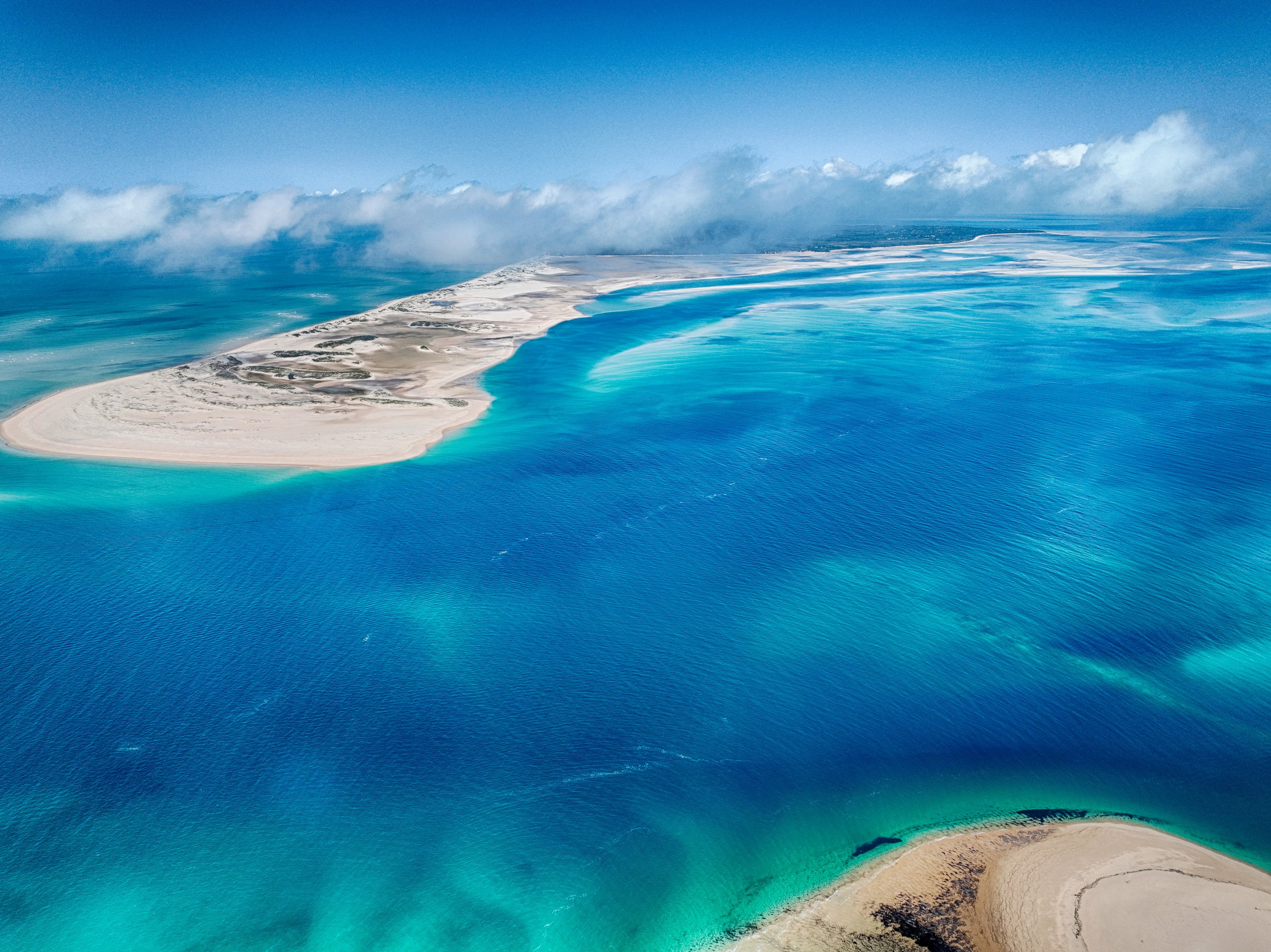
Aerial view of Benguerra Island

Benguerra (Portuguese pronunciation: [bẽˈɡɛʁa]) is the second largest island in the Bazaruto Archipelago of southern Mozambique. The island is approximately 55 km^{2} (21 sq mi) and lies 14 kilometres (8.7 mi) offshore. Portuguese explorers also gave the island the name Santo António. It is famous for its unspoiled white beaches, dive sites, luxury resorts, horseback riding and fishing.

== Habitat ==
Benguerra Island comprises forest, savannah, freshwater lakes and wetland eco-systems that sustain a diverse population of fauna and flora. Fresh water crocodiles can be found in the three lakes, bearing testimony to the island's mainland past. The island, which is home to approximately 140 bird species, was declared a National Park in 1971.
