= Islam in Africa =

Map of Muslim population in Africa by country and subnational region

Islam in Africa is the second most professed faith behind Christianity, practiced by about 33% of the population, according to multiple survey waves by Afrobarometer between 2016 and 2023. Although other estimates may place the population of Muslims as a share of the continent closer to 45%. Africa was the first continent into which Islam spread from the Middle East, during the early 7th century CE. It is likely the earliest Muslims in Africa were disciples of Muhammad who sought refugee in the Christian Kingdom of Aksum, present-day Eritrea and Ethiopia, as a result of local dissatisfaction with Muhammad in Mecca.

Like the vast majority of Muslims in the world, most Muslims in Africa are also Sunni Muslims; the complexity of Islam in Africa is revealed in the various schools of thought, traditions, and voices in many African countries. Many African ethnicities, mostly in the northern half of the continent, consider Islam as their traditional religion. Islam in Africa has often adapted to African cultural contexts and belief systems forming Africa's own orthodoxies.

As of 2025, Islam is the main religion of North Africa, the Horn of Africa, Sahel, the Swahili Coast, and West Africa, with minority immigrant populations in Southern Africa. In Sub-Saharan Africa, a 2020 survey found about 32.8% of the population were Muslims.

== History ==
The presence of Islam in Africa can be traced to the 7th century CE, when in Rajab 8 BH, or May 614 CE, Muhammad advised a number of his early disciples, who were facing persecution by the polytheistic inhabitants of Mecca, to seek refuge across the Red Sea in Axum. In the Muslim tradition, this event is known as the first hijrah, or migration. Twenty-three Muslims migrated to Abyssinia where they were protected by its king, Armah An-Najāshī, who later accepted Islam. They were followed by 101 Muslims later in the same year. Most of those Muslims returned to Medina in 7 AH / 628 CE but some settled in the neighboring Zeila (current day Somalia ) which was at that time part of Bilād al-Barbar ("Land of the Berber(s)"). Once in Zeila, they built the Masjid al-Qiblatayn ("Mosque of the two Qiblahs") in 627 CE. This mosque has two Qiblas because it was built before the Prophet switched the Qiblah from Jerusalem to Mecca. They also reportedly built Africa's oldest mosque, that is the Mosque of the Companions in the Eritrean city of Massawa. This qibla of this mosque in Massawa points towards Jerusalem as well, though now defunct, occasional prayers are still held in this mosque with qibla correction towards Mecca.

In 641 CE, during the reign of Caliph Umar ibn al-Khattab, Muslim troops took over current Egypt and conquered current Libya the following year. Muslims then expanded to current Tunisia in 647 CE, during the reign of the third Muslim Caliph Uthman Ibn Affan. The conquest of North Africa continued under the Umayyad dynasty, which annexed parts of Algeria around 680 CE and Morocco the following year. From the latter Muslim troops crossed the Strait of Gibraltar to Europe in 711 CE. Islam gained momentum during the 10th century in West Africa with the start of the Almoravid dynasty movement on the Senegal River and as rulers and kings embraced Islam. Islam then spread slowly in much of the continent through trade and preaching. During this period these Muslims from North and West Africa came to be known by Europeans at large as Moors. By the 9th century, Muslim Sultanates started being established in the Horn of Africa, and by the 12th century, the Kilwa Sultanate had spread as far south as Mozambique. Islam only crossed deeper into Malawi and Congo in the second half of the 19th century under the Zanzibar Sultanate. Then the British brought their labor force from India, including some Muslim-Indian nationals, to their colonies in Africa towards the end of the nineteenth and beginning of the twentieth century.

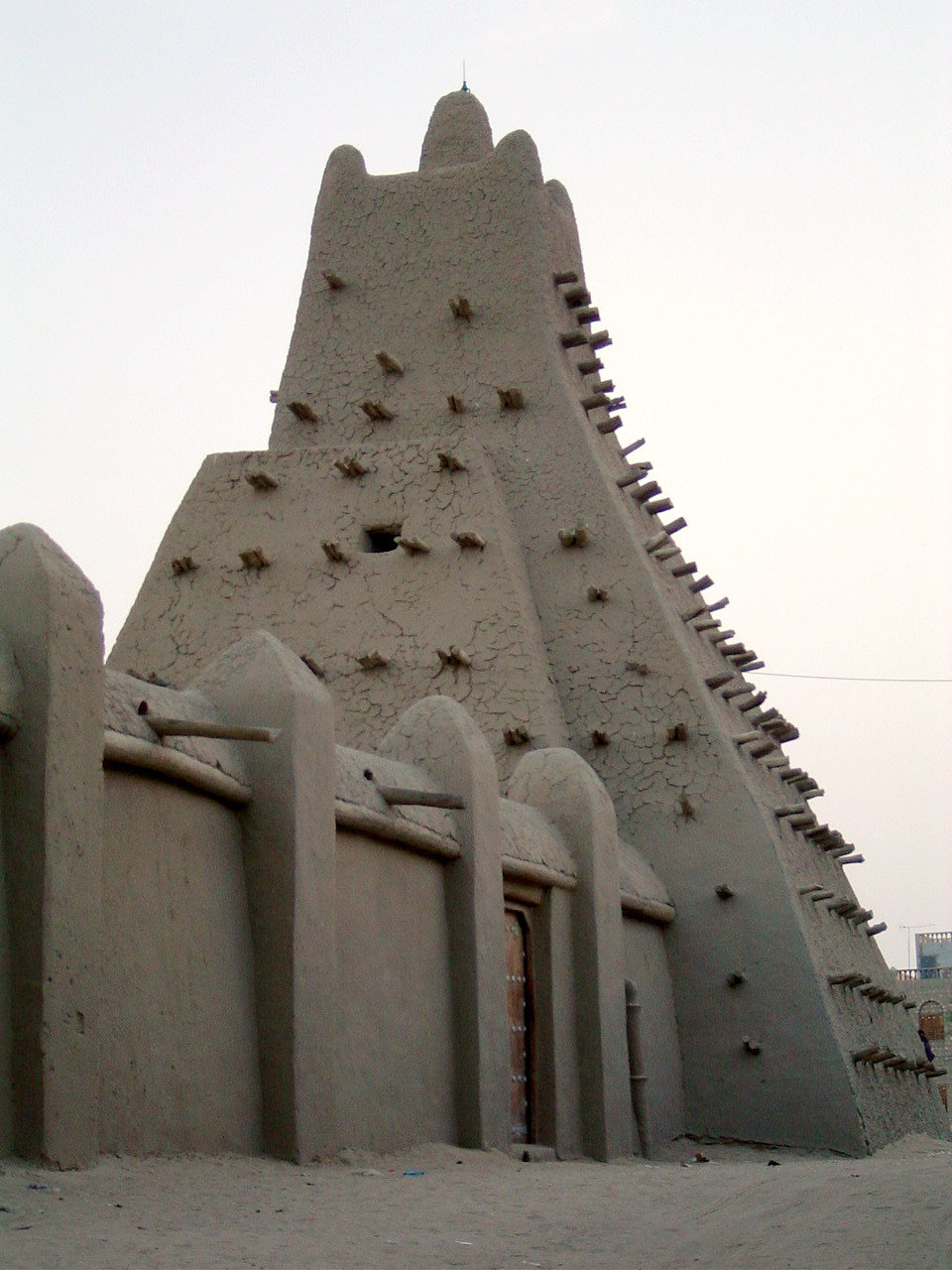
The 15th-century Sankore Madrasa, Timbuktu, Mali. The three mosques of Sankoré, Djinguereber Mosque and Sidi Yahya compose the famous University of Timbuktu.

Islam was introduced to the northern Somali coast early on from the Arabian peninsula, shortly after the hijra. Zeila's two-mihrab Masjid al-Qiblatayn dates to the 7th century, and is the oldest mosque in the city. In the late 9th century, Al-Yaqubi wrote that Muslims were living along the northern Somali seaboard. He also mentioned that the Adal kingdom had its capital in the city, suggesting that the Adal Sultanate with Zeila as its headquarters dates back to at least the 9th or 10th century. According to I.M. Lewis, the polity was governed by local dynasties, who also ruled over the similarly established Sultanate of Mogadishu in the littoral Benadir region to the south. Adal's history from this founding period forth would be characterized by a succession of battles with neighboring Abyssinia.

Islam continued to spread throughout the continent as a result of the trans-Saharan trade during the 11th century. Given the practice of Islam had baked in theory for contracts and trade, and given many Muslim scholars could read and write, there was a significant advantage to these individuals in trade. Today, academic research focuses on these merchant-scholars and their role in spreading Islam across the continent during this time.

In the following centuries, the consolidation of Muslim trading networks, connected by lineage, trade, and Sufi brotherhoods, had reached a peak in West Africa, enabling Muslims to wield tremendous political influence and power. During the reign of Umar II, the then governor of Africa, Ismail ibn Abdullah, was said to have won the Berbers to Islam by his just administration. Other early notable missionaries include Abdallah ibn Yasin, who started a movement which caused thousands of Berbers to accept Islam. In the 13th century, Al-Hajj Salim Suwari formulated an important theological rationale for peaceful coexistence with the non-Muslim ruling classes called the Suwarian tradition. Many Islamic schools were purely oral, and most children leaving Koranic schools were able to recite the whole of the Quran in Arabic despite not being fluent themselves.

The History of Islam in Africa and accounts of how the religion spread, especially in North and the Horn of Africa, has always been contentious. Head of Awqaf Africa London, Abu-Abdullah Adelabu has written in his Movements of Islam in face of the Empires and Kingdoms in Yorubaland claims about the early arrival of Islam in southwestern Nigeria. He seconded the Arab anthropologist Abduhu Badawi on the argument that the early Muslim missionaries had benefited their works from the fall of Kush in northern Sudan and the prosperity of the politically multicultural Abbasid period in the continent which, according to him, had created several streams of migration, moving west in the mid-9th century into Africa (Egypt and Sudan). Adelabu pointed at the popularity and influences of the Abbasid Dynasty (750–1258), the second great dynasty with the rulers carrying the title of 'Caliph' as fostering peaceful and prosperous migration of the intercultural Muslims from the Nile Valley to Niger as well as of the Arab traders from the desert to Benue. Some argue that adoption of Islam was motivated by the desire to enhance trade, as Islam provided a moral code of conduct to regulate commercial activities, especially with respect to credit and security.

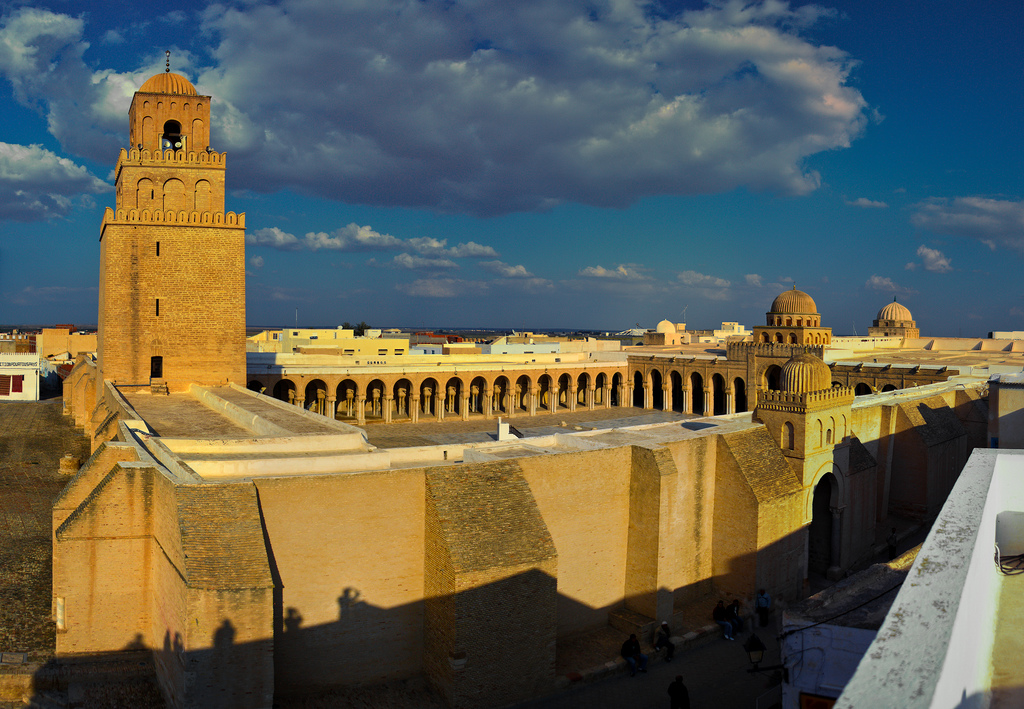
The Great Mosque of Kairouan (also known as the Mosque of Uqba), founded in 670 by the Arab general and conqueror Uqba Ibn Nafi, is the oldest mosque in Northwest Africa, located in the city of Kairouan, Tunisia.

Similarly, in the Swahili coast, Islam made its way inland – spreading at the expense of traditional African religions. This expansion of Islam in Africa not only led to the formation of new communities in Africa, but it also reconfigured existing African communities and empires to be based on Islamic models. Indeed, in the middle of the 11th century, the Kanem Empire, whose influence extended into Sudan, converted to Islam. At the same time but more toward West Africa, the reigning ruler of the Bornu Empire embraced Islam. As these kingdoms adopted Islam, their subjects thereafter followed suit. In praising the Africans' zealousness to Islam, the 14th-century explorer Ibn Battuta stated that mosques were so crowded on Fridays, that unless one went very early, it was impossible to find a place to sit.

In the 16th century, the Ouaddai Empire and the Kingdom of Kano embraced Islam, and later toward the 18th century, the Nigeria based Sokoto Caliphate led by Usman dan Fodio exerted considerable effort in spreading Islam in the Fulani Jihad.

Today, Islam is the predominant religion of the northern half of Africa, mainly concentrated in North Africa, the Horn of Africa and the Sahel, as well as West Africa. When North Africa is grouped with the Middle East (MENA), a 2024 survey found 94% of the region's religious population is Muslim. This is driven by Islam-dominated countries such as Djibouti (97%), Mali (90%), and Senegal (89%).

== Characteristics ==
Islam has been in Africa for so long, since its emergence on the Arabian peninsula, that some scholars have argued that it is a traditional African religion. Although the majority of Muslims in Africa are non-denominational Muslims, Sunni or Sufi, the complexity of Islam in Africa is revealed in the various schools of thought, traditions, and voices that constantly contend for dominance in many African countries. Islam in Africa is not static and is constantly being reshaped by prevalent social, economic and political conditions.

Islam in Africa is often adapted to local cultural contexts and belief systems, thereby forming the continent's own orthodoxies. Different societies in Africa have generally appropriated Islam in both more inclusive ways, or in the more radical ways, as with the Almoravid movement in the Maghreb and Sahara.

Additionally, Islam in Africa has both local and global dimensions. On the local level, experts assert that Muslims (including African Muslims) operate with considerable autonomy and do not have an international organization that regulates their religious practices. This fact accounts for the differences and varieties in Islamic practices throughout the African continent. On the global level, Muslims in Africa are also part of the Ummah (Islamic community worldwide), and follow global issues and current events that affect the Muslim world with keen interest. With globalization and new initiatives in information technology, Muslims in Africa have developed and maintained close connections with the wider Muslim world.

Hassan, citing Marcovitz (2007), says that:

Analysts argue that African Muslims, like other Muslims in Asia, the Middle East and the rest of the world, seem to be locked into an intense struggle regarding the future direction of Islam. At core of the struggle are questions about the way in which Muslims should practice their faith. The scholars assert that the majority seems to prefer to remain on the moderate, tolerant course that Islam has historically followed. However, a relatively small, but growing group would like to establish a stricter form of the religion, one that informs and controls all aspects of society.

== Muslim law (Shari'ah) ==
The Sharīʿah of Islam broadly influences the legal code in most Islamic countries, but the extent of which its impact varies widely. In Africa, most states limit the use of Sharia to "personal-status law" for issues such as marriage, divorce, inheritance and child custody. With the exception of northern Nigeria in West Africa, secularism does not seem to face any serious threat in Africa, even though the new Islamic revival is having a great impact upon segments of Muslim populations. Cohabitation or coexistence between Muslims and non-Muslims remains, for the most part, peaceful.

Nigeria is home to Africa's largest Muslim population. In 1999, Nigeria's northern states adopted the Sharia penal code, but punishments have been rare. In fact, dozens of women convicted of adultery and sentenced to stoning to death have later been freed. Egypt, one of the largest Muslim states in Africa, claims Sharia as the main source of its legislation, yet its penal and civil codes are based largely on French law.

== Sects ==
Muslims in Africa mostly adhere to Sunni Islam, with sizable Ibadi adherents. In addition, Sufism, the mystical dimension of Islam, has a very big presence. The Maliki madh'hab is the dominant school of jurisprudence amongst most of the continent's Sunni communities, while the Shafi'i madh'hab is prevalent in the Horn of Africa, eastern Egypt, and the Swahili Coast. The Hanafi fiqh is also followed in Northern and Western Egypt.

=== Quranists ===
Quranism is an umbrella term denoting a strand within Islam that endorses a Quran-oriented form of Islam and often eschews hadiths. There are many forms of Quranism and they may not all agree on practical tenets.

=== Non-denominational Muslims ===
According to a 2014 survey by Pew, there are thirteen countries in Africa wherein at least twenty percent of the Muslim population identify as non-denominational Muslims. These individuals practice Islam, but are not associated with a specific denomination. These countries, as well as the percentages of the Muslim populations who fall under this bracket include, Mali (55%), Nigeria (42%), Cameroon (40%), Tunisia (40%), Guinea Bissau (36%), Uganda (33%), Morocco (30%), Senegal (27%), Chad (23%), Ethiopia (23%), Liberia (22%), Niger (20%), and Tanzania (20%).

=== Sufism ===
Sufism, which focuses on the mystical elements of Islam, has many orders as well as followers in West Africa and Sudan, and, like other orders, strives to know God through meditation and emotion. Sufis may be nondenominational Muslim, Sunni or Shi’ite, and their ceremonies may involve chanting, music, dancing, and meditation.

Many Sufis in Africa are syncretic where they practise Sufism with traditional folklore beliefs. Salafis criticize the folklorists Sufis, who they claim have incorporated "un-Islamic" beliefs into their practices, such as celebrating the several events, visiting the shrines of "Islamic saints", dancing during prayer (the whirling dervishes).

West Africa and Sudan have various Sufi orders regarded skeptically by the more doctrinally strict branches of Islam in the Middle East. Most orders in West Africa emphasize the role of a spiritual guide, marabout or possessing supernatural power, regarded as an Africanization of Islam. In Senegal and Gambia, Mouridism Sufis claim to have several million adherents and have drawn criticism for their veneration of Mouridism's founder Amadou Bamba. The Tijani is the most popular Sufi order in West Africa, with a large following in Mauritania, Mali, Niger, Senegal and Gambia.

=== Salafism ===
Recently, Salafism has begun spreading in Africa, as a result of many Muslim Non-Governmental Organizations (NGOs) such as the World Muslim League, the World Assembly for Muslim Youth, and the Federation of Mab and Islamic Schools primarily funded by Salafi governments in the Arab states of the Persian Gulf. These Salafist organizations, often based out of Saudi Arabia, promote a form of conservative reformism and regard Sufism as "heterodox" and contrary to their interpretation of traditional Islam. Such NGOs have built Salafi-dominated mosques and Islamic centers in Africa, and many are staffed by puritanical African Muslims, often trained in the Middle East. Academic scholarships to study in Islamic universities in the Middle East are also offered to further Salafism.

On the other hand, Africanist scholars trace the popularity of Salafi ideals to local cultural factors and the social efforts of prominent African Salafi scholars, reformists, organisations and intellectuals and their religious ties with various Islamic scholars across the Muslim World.

=== Ahmadiyya ===
Ahmadiyya Muslims are also present across Africa. They are known for having an unorthodox belief related to the return of the Messiah. Given these beliefs and their minority presence in most countries, there have been reported incidence of discrimination against the Ahmadis in both Algeria and The Gambia.

== Mosques ==
Examples of mosques across countries in Africa
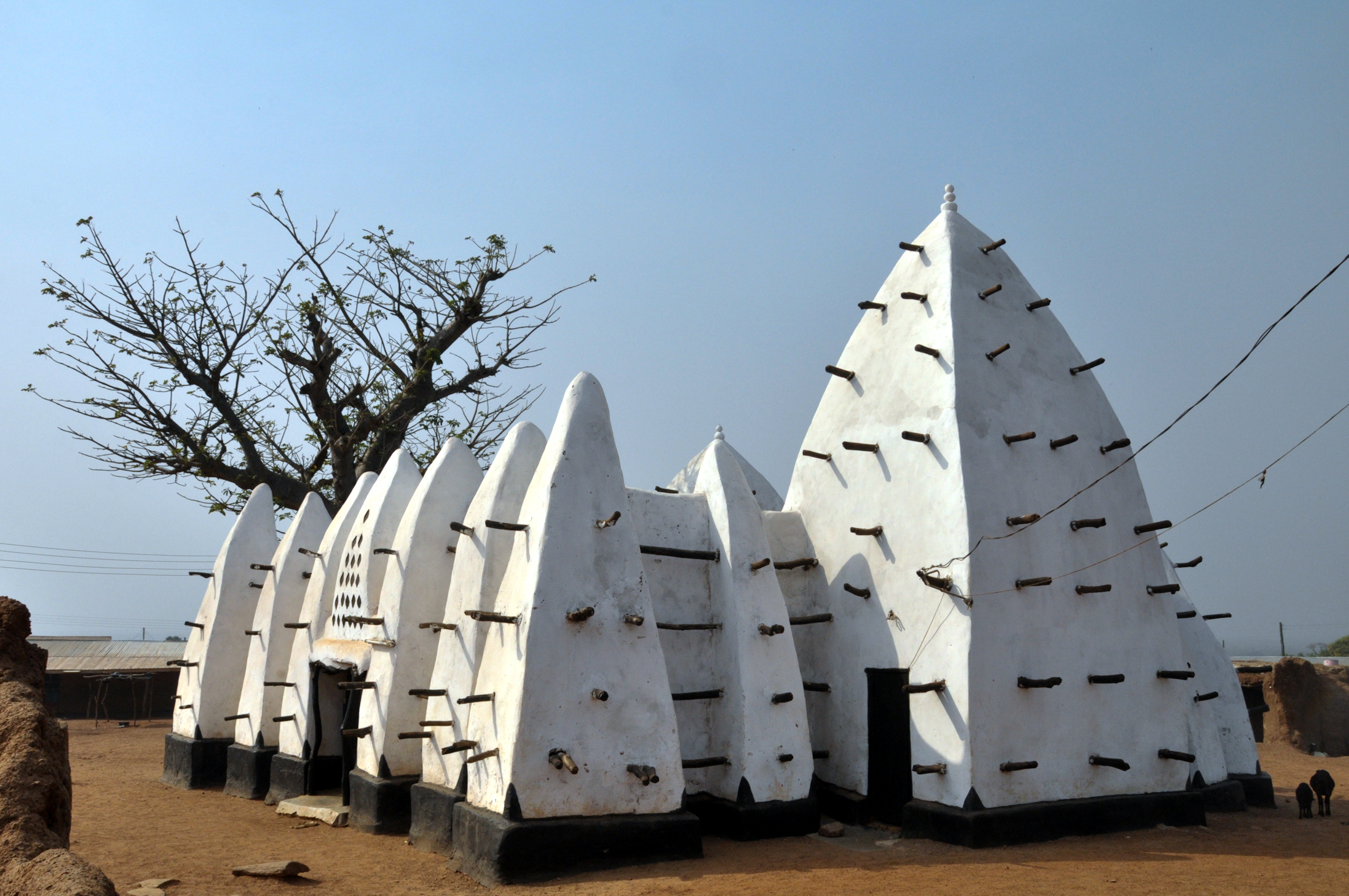
13th-century Larabanga Mosque of Ghana

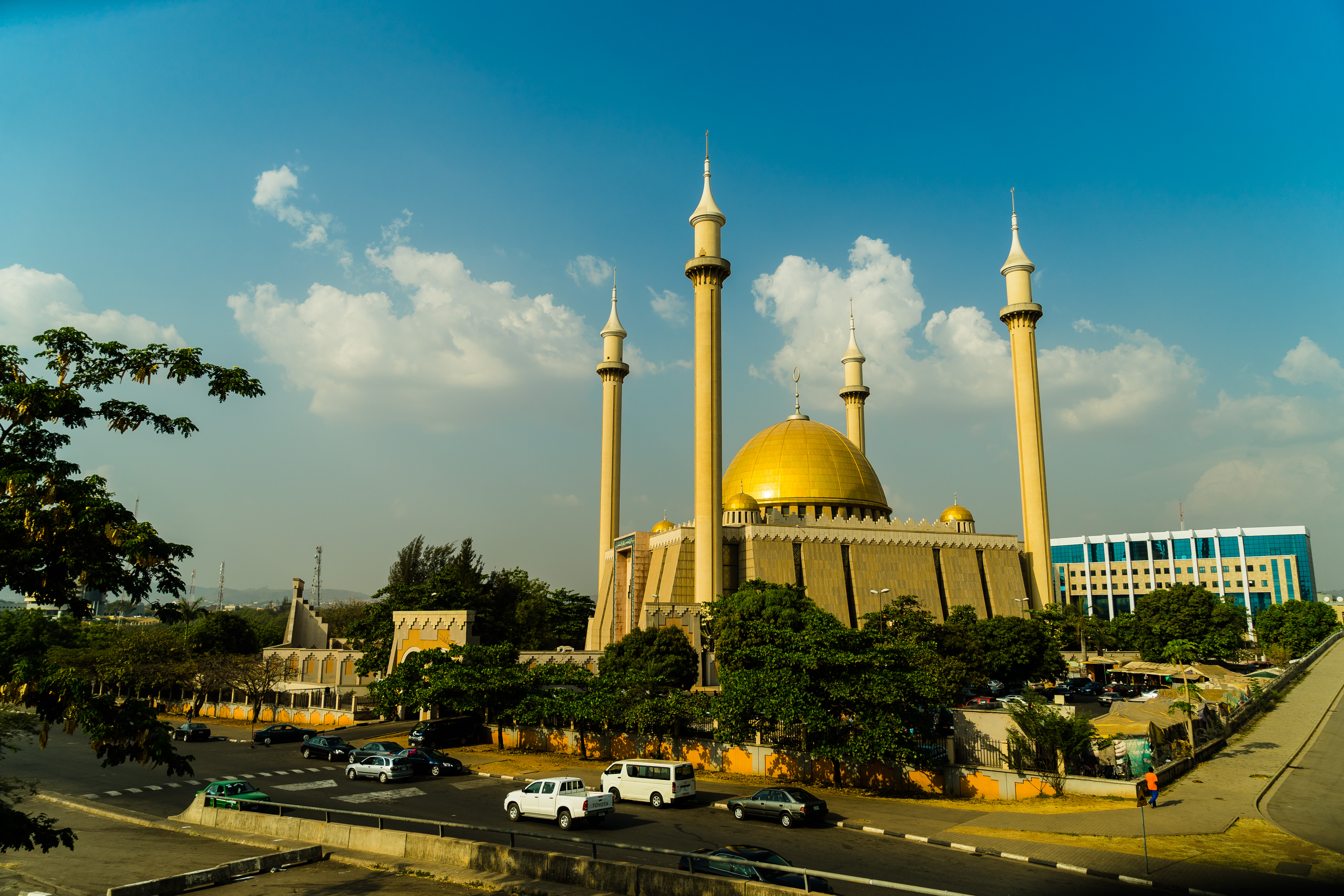
The Abuja National Mosque in Abuja, Nigeria

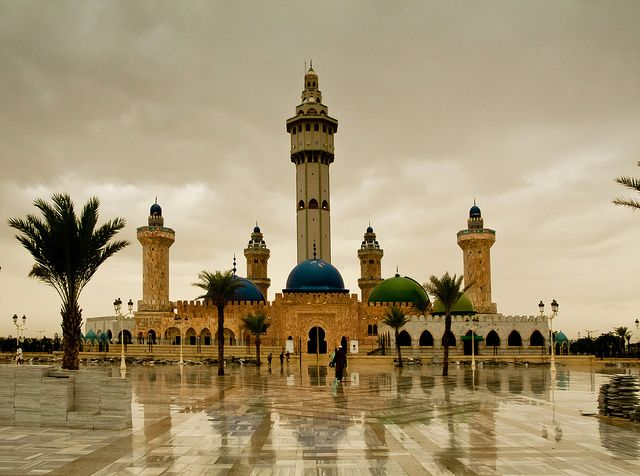
The Great Mosque of Touba, Senegal

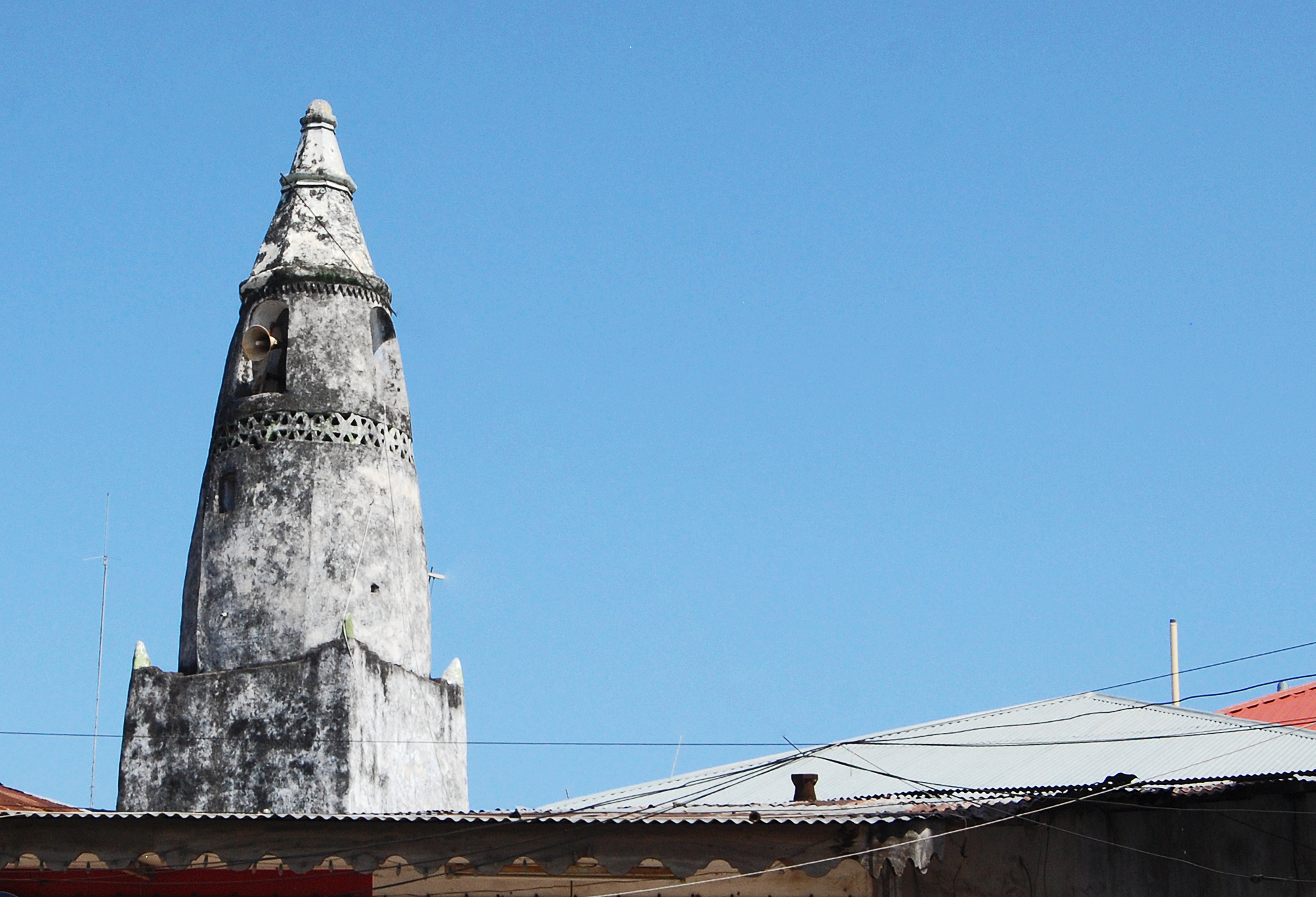
Minaret of the Malindi Mosque in Stone Town, Zanzibar

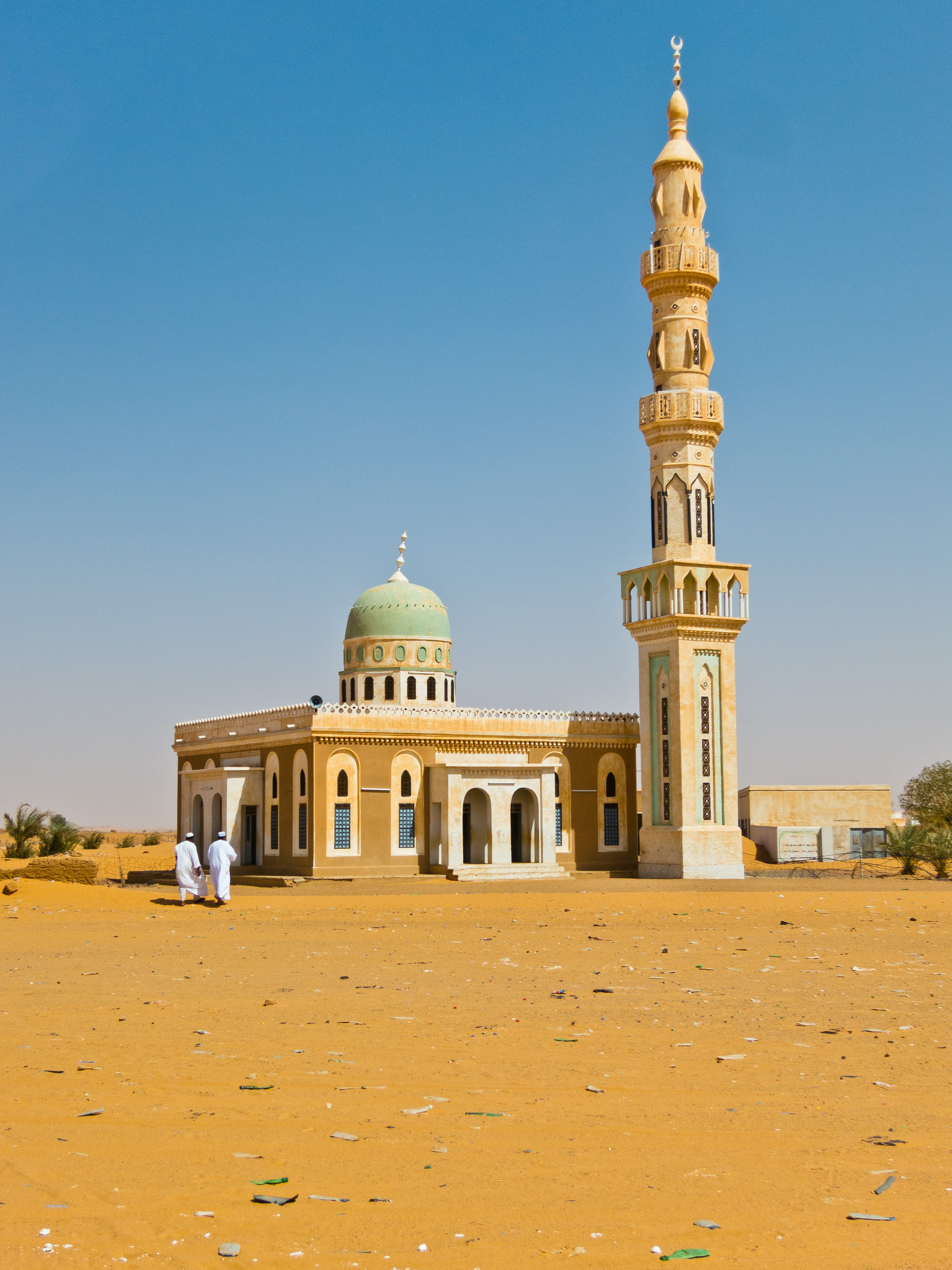
The Khartoum-Karima Mosque in Sudan, Nile Valley

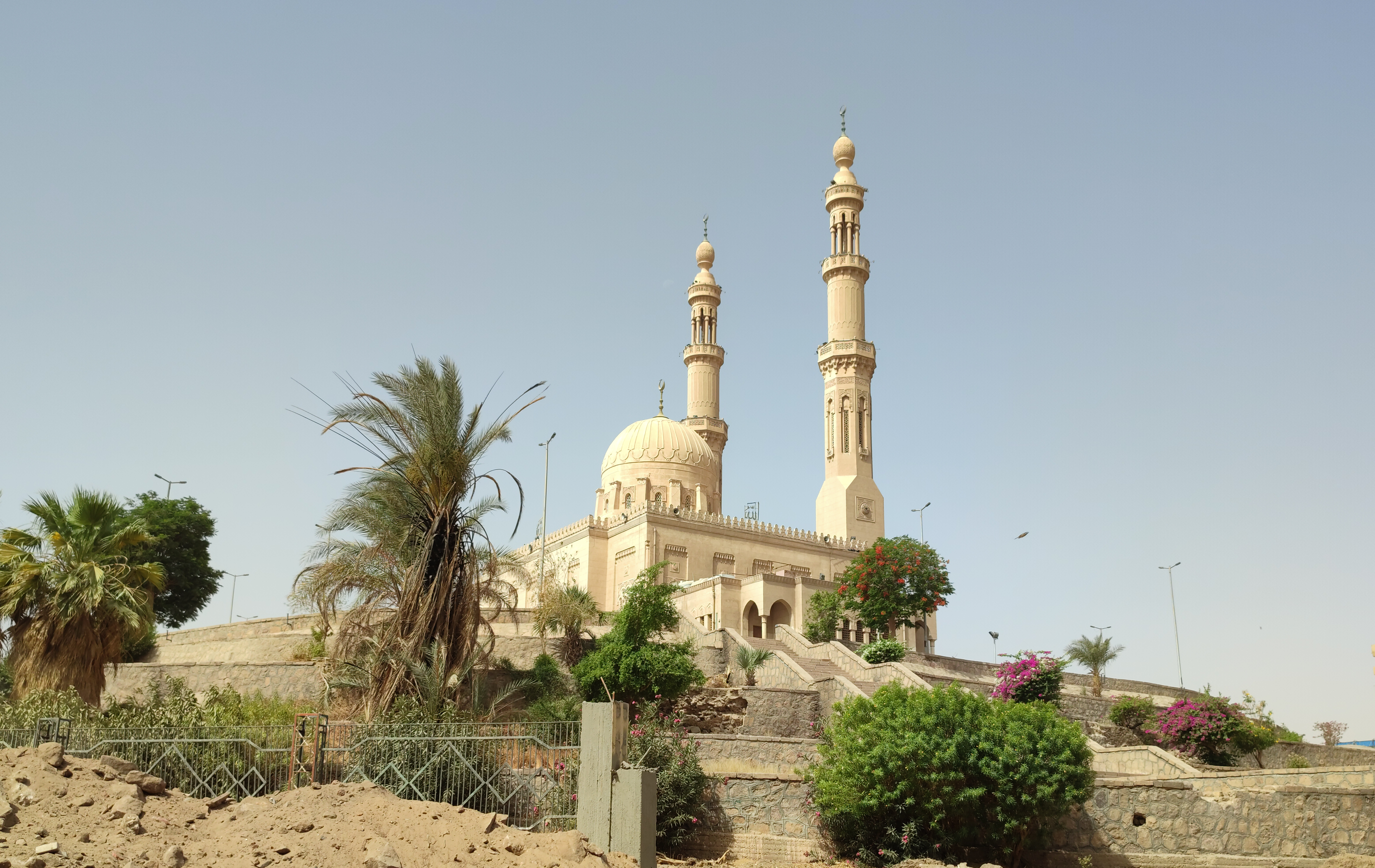
El-Tabia Mosque in Aswan, Egypt

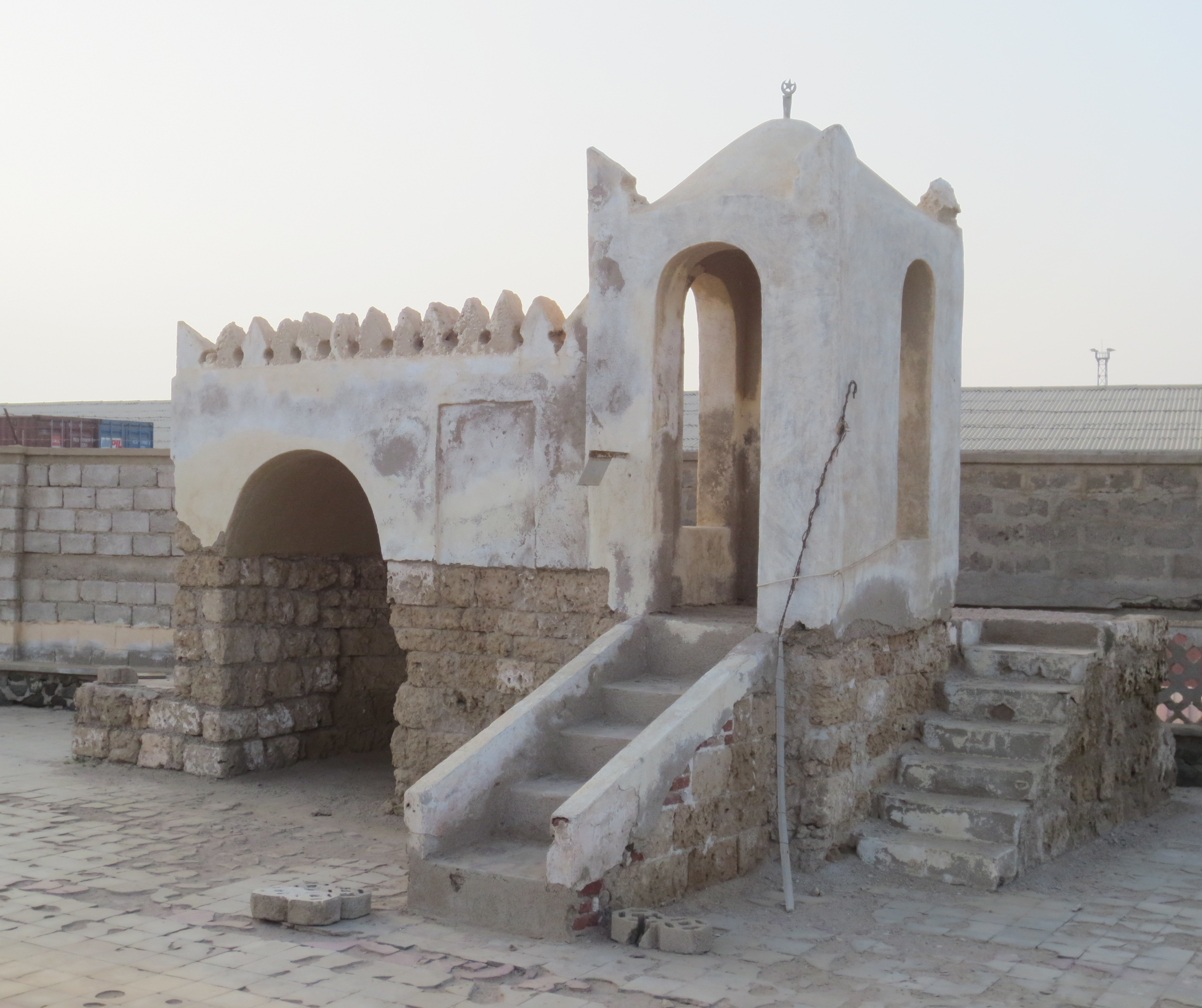
Masjid as-Sahabah Mosque in Massawa, Eritrea

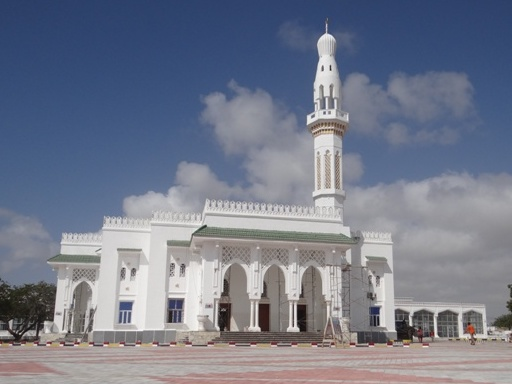
The Mosque of Islamic Solidarity in Mogadishu, Somalia. Largest mosque in the Horn of Africa.

== Notable kingdoms and sultanates ==
- Gadabuursi Ughazate (1604–1885)
- Harla Kingdom (500–1500)
- Wadai Sultanate (1501–1911)
- Kanem Empire (700–1376)
- Sayfawa dynasty (850–1846)
- Idrisid dynasty (789–974)
- Sultanate of Mogadishu (c. 900 – 16th century)
- Maghrawa dynasty (987–1070)
- Kingdom of Kano (1000–1805)
- Dhulbahante Garaadate (1530–1960)
- Kilwa Sultanate (12th century – 1505)
- Almohad dynasty (1147–1269)
- Mali Empire (1230s–1600s)
- Marinid dynasty (1258–1420)
- Ajuran Sultanate (13th–17th century)
- Ifat Sultanate (1285–1415)
- Songhai Empire (1340–1591)
- Bornu Empire (1369–1893)
- Adal Sultanate (1415–1555)
- Hiraab Imamate (17th century–1874)
- Isaaq Sultanate (17th century–1884)
- Wattasid dynasty (1420–1554)
- Sennar Sultanate (1502–1821)
- Saadi dynasty(1554–1659)
- Dendi Kingdom (1591–1901)
- Sultanate of Darfur (1603–1874)
- Alaouite dynasty (1666–present)
- Kong Empire (1710–1894)
- Majeerteen Sultanate (mid-18th century – early 20th century)
- Imamate of Futa Jallon (1727–1896)
- Almamyate of Futa Toro (1776–1861)
- Sokoto Caliphate (1804–1903)
- Kingdom of Gomma (early 19th century – 1886)
- Kingdom of Jimma (1830–1932)
- Kingdom of Gumma (1840–1902)
- Wassoulou Empire (1878–1898)
- Sultanate of Hobyo (1880s–1920s)
- Dervish State (1896–1920)
- Emirate of Harar (967–1887)
- Makhzumi dynasty (896–1286)

== Muslim population in Africa by country ==
Islam in Africa is growing, predominantly in the Sub-Saharan region. Currently, MENA, which includes North Africa, is the most Muslim region of the world, with the highest percentage of Muslims as a share of the total population. Asia continues to have the most number, or gross number, of Muslims. Three of the ten countries with the largest Muslim populations in 2026 were in Africa, where the percentage of total global Muslim population is in parentheses: Nigeria (4.9%), Egypt (4.5%) and Algeria (2.2%).

Estimated Muslim population by country, 2020
	Est. pop. of Muslims	Est. total pop.	Share pop.
Algeria	43,330,000	47,400,000	95%
Angola	90,000	33,450,000	<1%
Benin	4,100,000	13,070,000	31%
Botswana	<10,000	2,370,000	<1%
Burkina Faso	14,480,000	21,480,000	66%
Burundi	380,000	12,620,000	<1%
Cameroon	9,314,939	30,987,821	30.06%
Cape Verde	<10,000	510,000	<1%
Central African Republic	310,000	5,030,000	6%
Chad	9,710,000	17,220,000	56%
Comoros	790,000	800,000	99%
Republic of the Congo	80,000	5,750,000	<1%
Democratic Republic of the Congo	1,220,000	95,990,000	1.5%
Djibouti	1,080,000	1,110,000	97%
Egypt	93,991,000	114,120,000	94.9
Equatorial Guinea	30,000	700,000	4.0
Eritrea	1,920,000	5,250,000	36.6
Ethiopia	28,680,000	82,950,000	34.6
Gabon	170,000	1,510,000	11.2
(The Gambia) Gambia	1,640,000	1,730,000	95.1
Ghana	3,860,000	24,390,000	15.8
Guinea	8,430,000	9,980,000	84.4
Guinea-Bissau	680,000	1,520,000	45.1
Ivory Coast	7,390,000	19,740,000	42.5
Kenya	3,920,000	40,510,000	9.7
Kingdom of Morocco	32,460,000	32,460,000	98.0
Lesotho	<10,000	2,170,000	<1.0
Liberia	480,000	3,990,000	12.0
Libya	6,140,000	6,360,000	96.6
Madagascar	620,000	20,710,000	3.0
Malawi	1,930,000	14,900,000	13.0
Mali	14,510,000	15,370,000	94.4
Mauritania	3,430,000	3,460,000	98.0
Mauritius	220,000	1,300,000	17.3
Mayotte	200,000	200,000	98.6
Mozambique	4,200,000	23,390,000	18.0
Namibia	<10,000	2,280,000	<1.0
Niger	15,270,000	15,510,000	98.4
Nigeria	120,000,000	237,500,000	58%
(Réunion) Reunion	40,000	850,000	4.2
Rwanda	190,000	10,620,000	1.8
(Saint Helena) St. Helena	<10,000	<10,000	<1.0
(São Tomé and Príncipe) Sao Tome and Principe	<10,000	170,000	<1.0
Senegal	11,980,000	12,430,000	96.4
Seychelles	<10,000	90,000	1.1
Sierra Leone	4,580,000	5,870,000	78.0
Somalia	19,009,151	18,330,000	98.00
South Africa	860,000	50,130,000	1.7
South Sudan	2,316,000	11,580,000	20
Sudan	45,480,000	46,880,000	97
(Eswatini) Swaziland	<10,000	1,190,000	<1.0
Tanzania	15,770,000	44,840,000	35.2
Togo	840,000	6,030,000	14.0
Tunisia	10,430,000	10,480,000	98.0
Uganda	3,840,000	33,420,000	11.5
Zambia	70,000	13,090,000	<1.0
Zimbabwe	110,000	12,570,000	<1.0

== See also ==
- List of mosques in Africa
- Trade and pilgrimage routes of Ghana
- Islam in South Asia
- Islam in Nigeria
- Islam in Uganda
- Union of African Muslim Scholars
