= Africa Muslims Agency =

Islamic humanitarian organisation

- Abbreviation: AMA
- Formation: 1981

The Africa Muslims Agency (AMA) is an Islamic humanitarian organisation. It was founded in 1981, and is funded primarily by Kuwaiti aid and dawah donations from Muslims.

The Cape Town office was started in 1987 by Mahomed Farid Choonara, and under his directorship the agency grew to become one of the largest aid organisations in Africa. MF Choonara (born 3 November 1949) died 9 April 2011), and was succeeded as director by his son, Imraan Choonara.

The AMA describes itself as a humanitarian, development and Dawah organization based in Kuwait with offices across Africa. The agency has established itself in much of Africa, including Sierra Leone, Mali, Mozambique, Madagascar, Zimbabwe, Angola, the Gambia and particularly South Africa. The Agency's goals are to strengthen Islam by spreading the teachings of the Quran, as well as to build hospitals, schools and mosques.

In 2010, the International Labour Office noted that the AMA focused on direct aid, including the building of wells for clean drinking water.

In Niger, the AMA has played a prominent role in development since 1985. Its goals and tactics changed dramatically since it was established.

In 1998, it was given consultative status at the United Nations Economic and Social Council. In 2007, its leaders were monitored and interrogated by police.

== See also ==
- Islam in Africa
