= Tronja Mosque =

Mosque in Tunis, Tunisia

- مسجد ترنجة
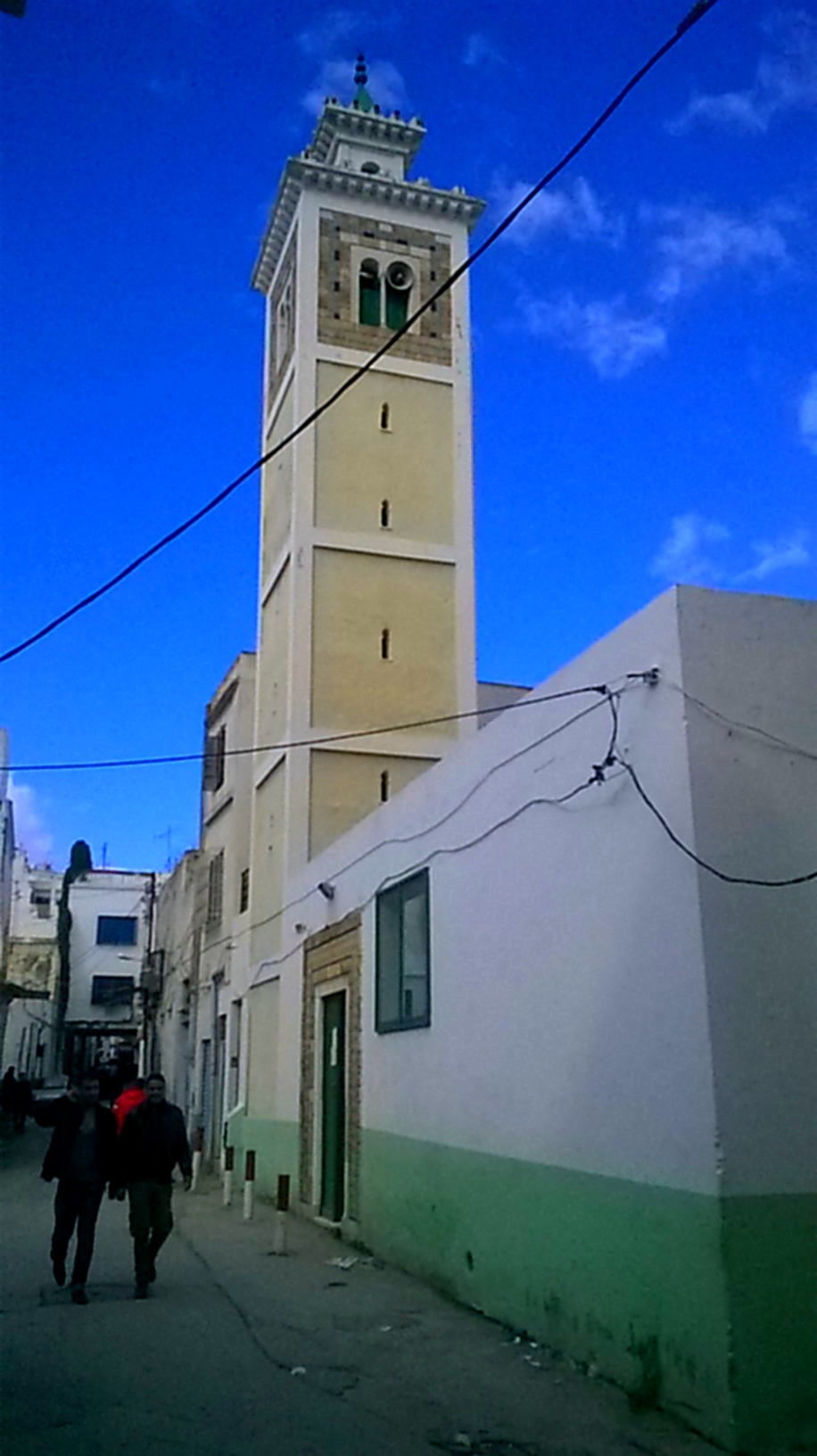

- Location within Tunisia

Religion
- Affiliation: Sunni Islam

Location
- Location: Tunis, Tunisia
- Interactive map of Tronja Mosque
- Coordinates: 36.803824°N 10.173488°E

Architecture
- Type: Mosque

The Tronja Mosque is a Tunisian mosque, located in the Tronja area, which is a part of the Bab Souika suburb, in the north of the medina of Tunis.

== Localization ==
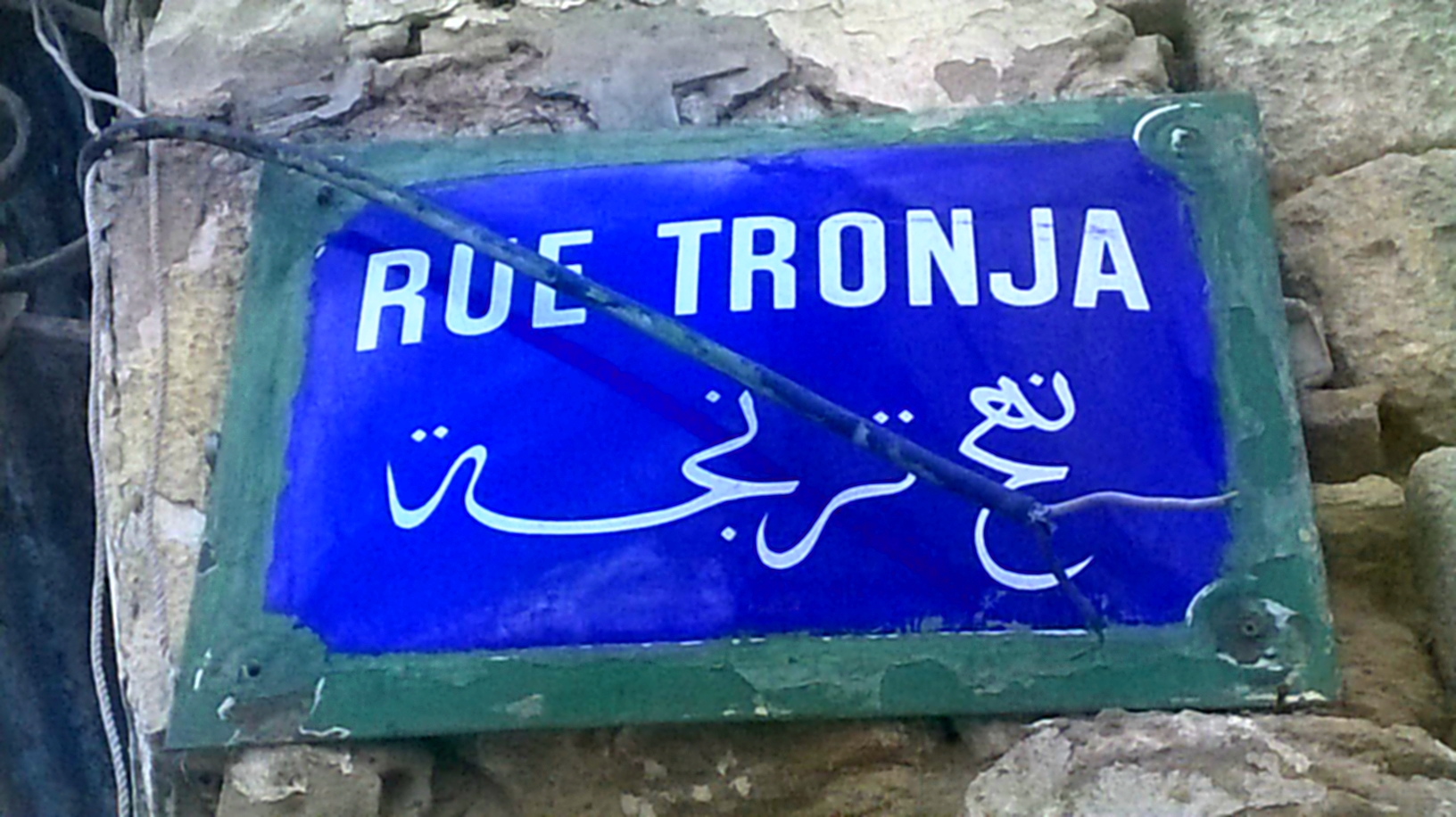
Plaque indicating the Tronja Street

The mosque is located at 13, Tronja Street.

== Etymology ==
According to the Andalusian geographer and historian Al-Bakri, the gardens surrounding the city of Tunis produced high quality citrons, known for their good taste and parfume. Therefore, this was the origin of the Tronja street's and the Old Tronja's names.

== History ==
The mosque was completely rebuilt by the municipality of Tunis in November 1983 - the year when the minaret was added - according to the commemorative plaque on the building. However, the original date of construction is not often mentioned in the literature.

== See also ==
- Islam in Tunisia
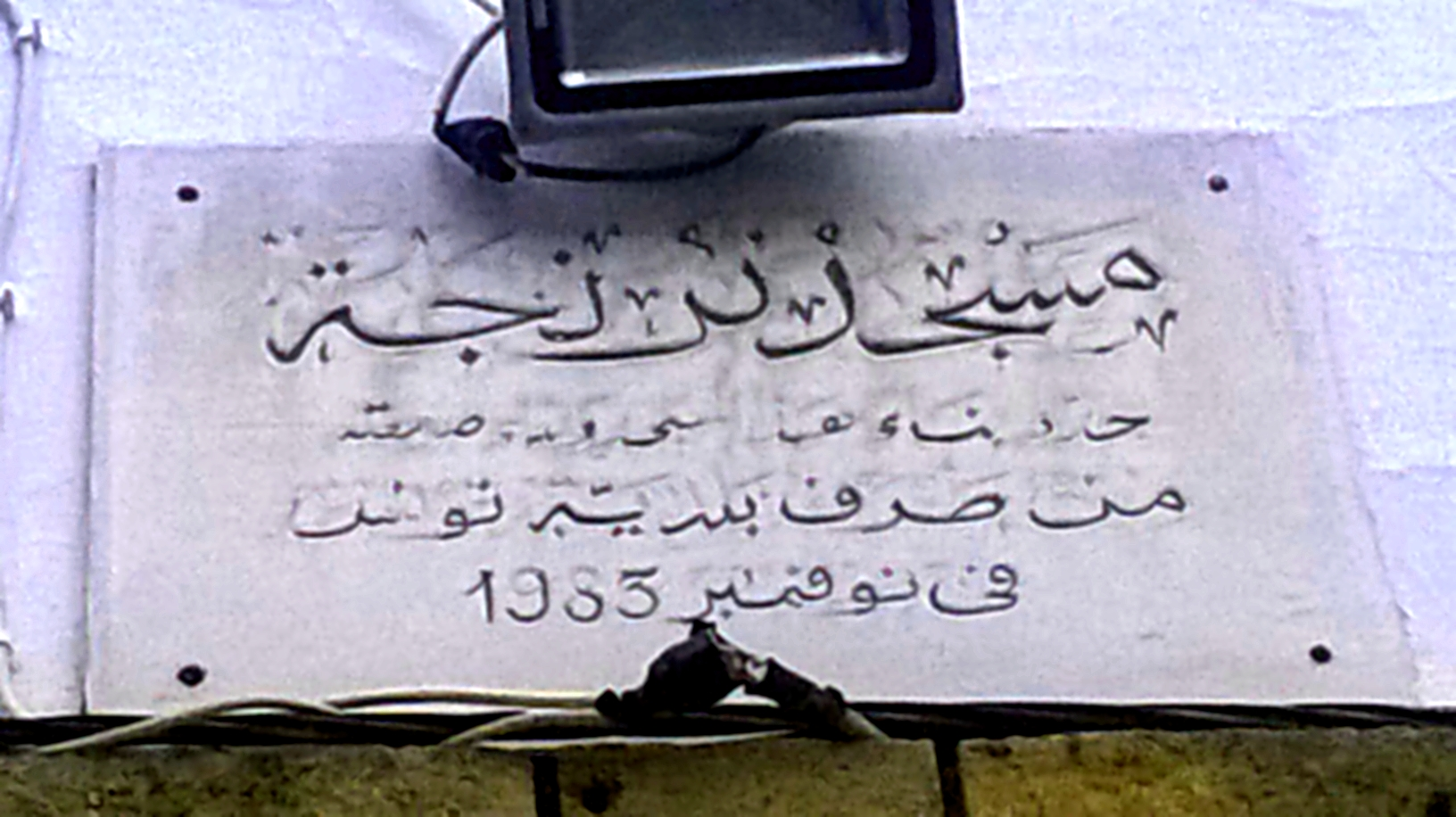
Commemorative plaque of the mosque

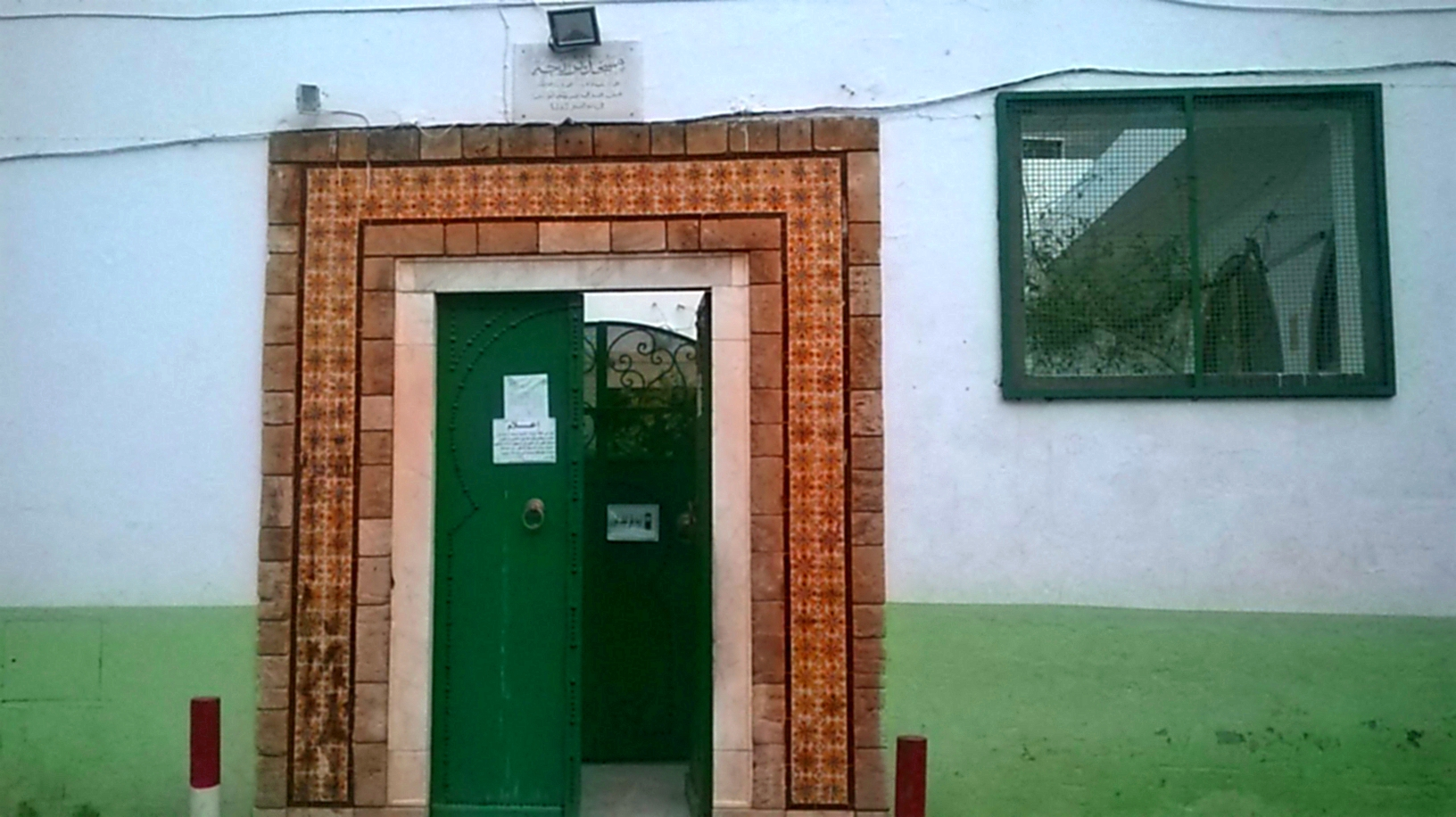
Entry door

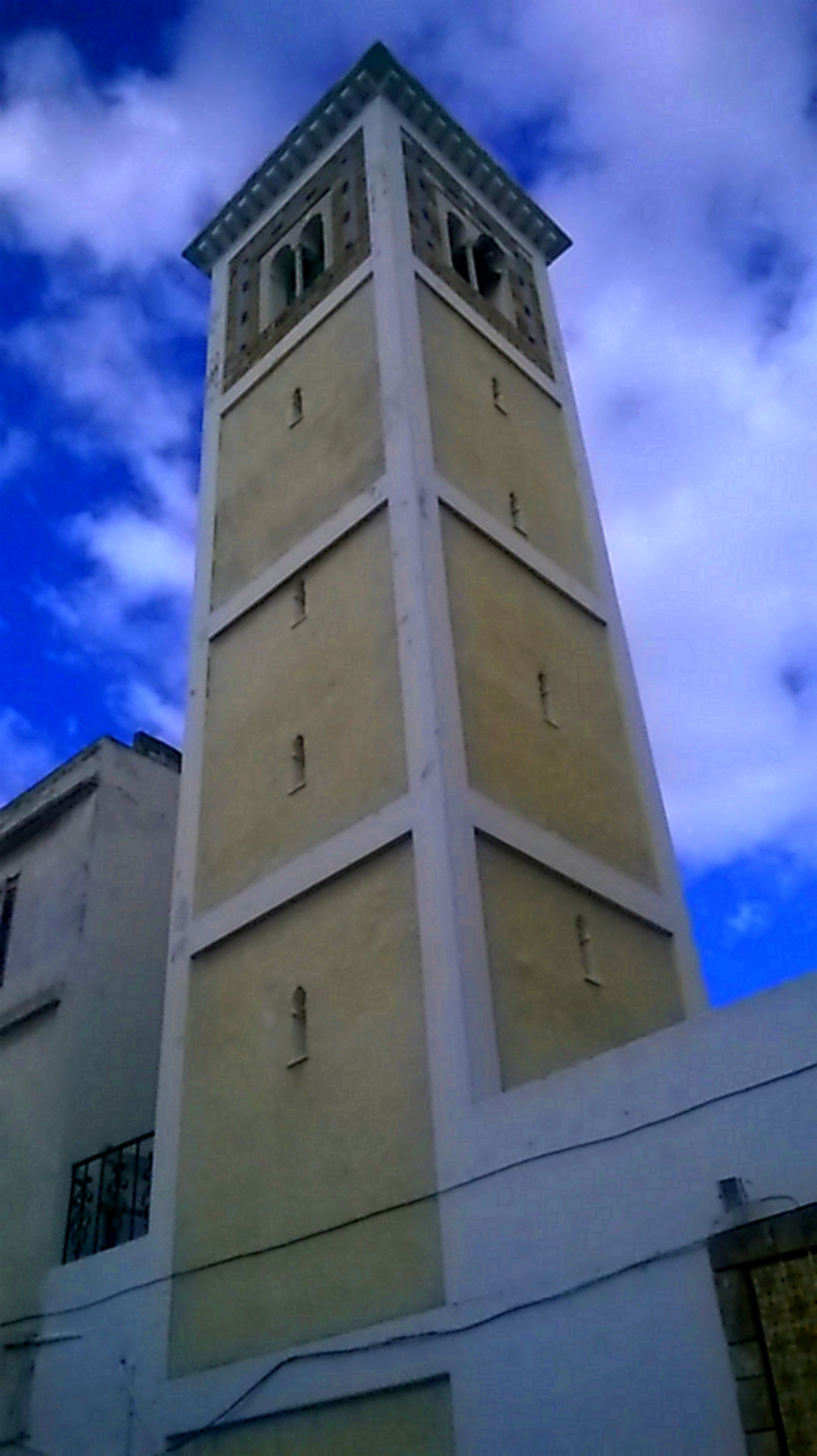
Minaret
