= Irreligion in Mozambique =

Religious affiliation in Mozambique
Affiliation	1997 census	2007 census
Christian	49.1%	56.1%
Catholic	23.8%	28.4%
Zionist Christian	17.5%	15.5%
Evangelical	7.8% (Note: In the 1997 census "Evangelical" was merged with "Protestant".)	10.9%
Anglican	(Note: The 1997 census did not have a separate category for "Anglican".)	1.3%
Muslim	17.8%	17.9%
None	23.1%	18.7%
Other/Unknown	10.0%	7.3%
Notes

Irreligion in Mozambique is not uncommon among Mozambicans largely in part due to past government suppression of religion. Though Christianity predominates, according to 2007 census results 19% of the country do not identify with a religion, down from 23.1% in 1997.

== See also ==
- Religion in Mozambique
- Islam in Mozambique
- Demographics of Mozambique
