= Religion in Mozambique =

Religion in Mozambique (2026 estimate)
1. Roman Catholic (17.1%)
2. Evangelical (10.3%)
3. Baptist (1.70%)
4. Zionist Christian (4.00%)
5. Other Christian (35.5%)
6. Islam (21.3%)
7. Traditional faiths (0.40%)
8. No religion or Agnosticism (7.70%)
9. Other/Refused/Don't know (2.00%)

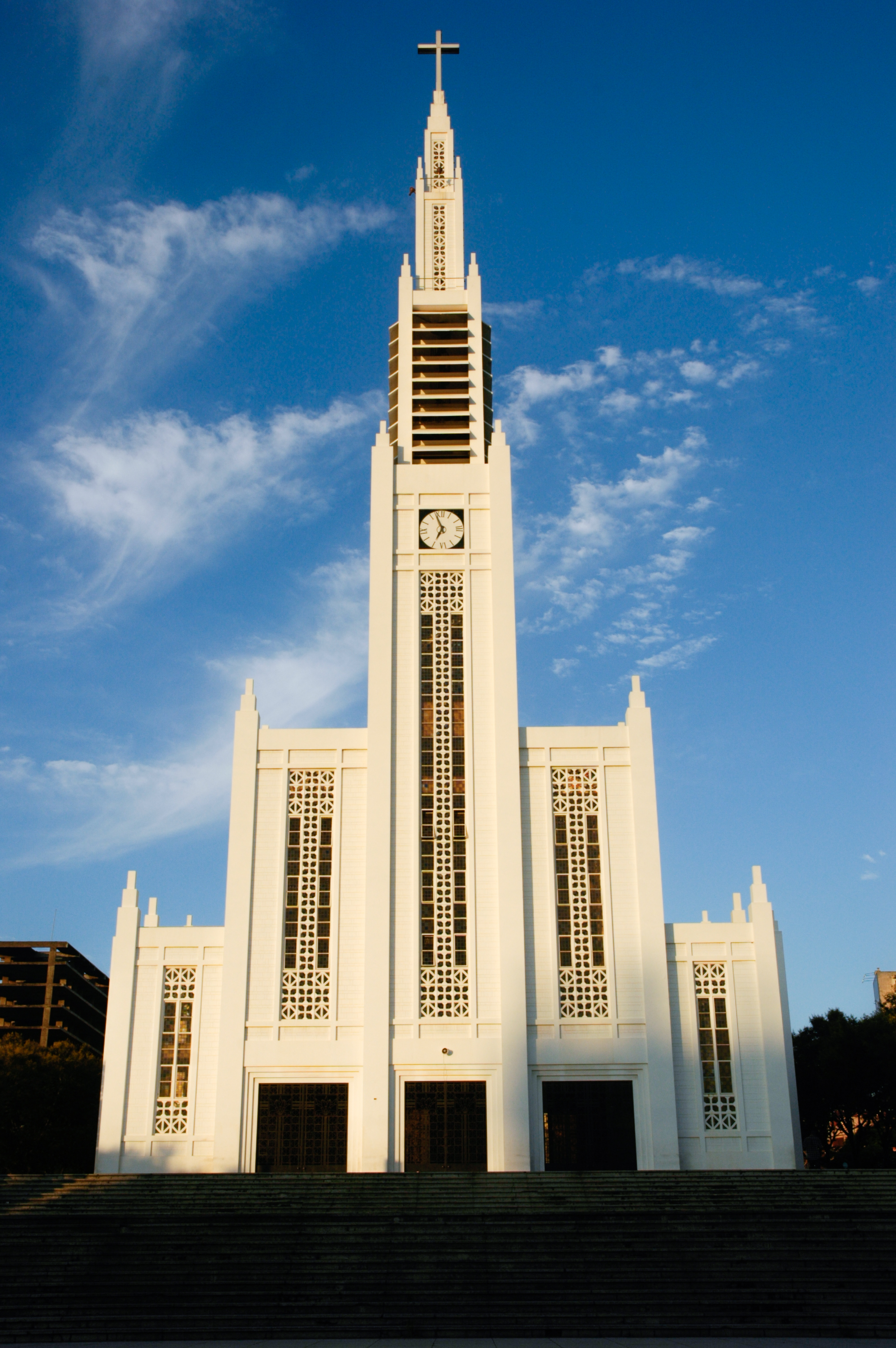
The Maputo Cathedral.

Christianity is the largest religion in Mozambique, with substantial minorities adhering to Islam or identifying with no religion.

Mozambique is a secular state. According to a 2026 Afrobarometer survey, 68.6% of the population of Mozambique was Christian, 21.3% was Muslim, 7.7% had no religion, 0.4% adhered to traditional beliefs, and 2.0% of the population practised other religions or chose not to state their religious affiliation. Protestants outnumbered Catholics.

== Religious demography ==
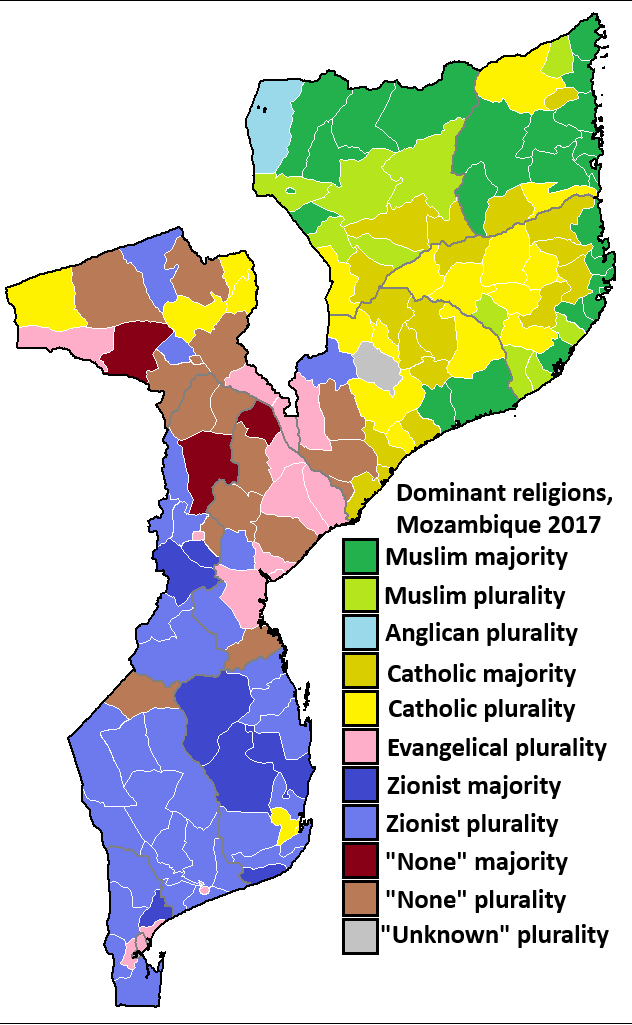
Largest religion by district in Mozambique according to the 2017 census

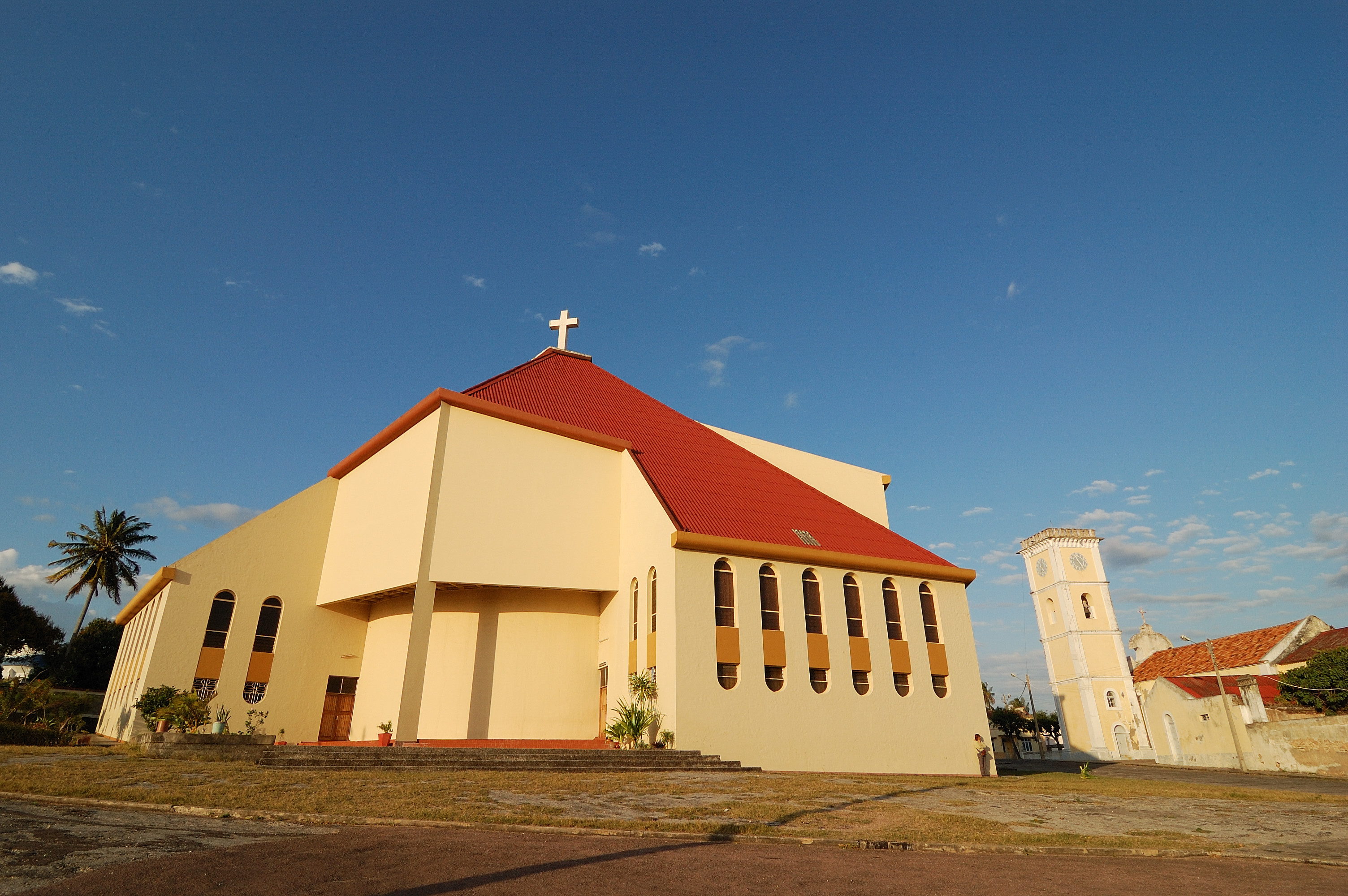
Inhambane Cathedral

=== Early 2000s ===
In the early 2000s, religious communities were dispersed throughout the country. Northern provinces were predominantly Muslim, especially along the coastal strip, and some areas of the inland northern areas had a stronger concentration of Catholic or Protestant communities; Catholics and Protestants were generally more numerous in the southern and central regions, but Muslim minority populations were also present in these areas. The National Directorate of Religious Affairs in the Ministry of Justice stated that Evangelical Christians represented the fastest growing religious group in the country due to other Christian sects converting to Evangelical Christianity; most religious communities tended to draw their members from across ethnic, political, economic, and racial lines.

In 2010, there were 732 religious denominations and 144 religious organizations registered with the Department of Religious Affairs of the Ministry of Justice; Major Christian religious groups include Catholic, Anglican, Baptist, The Church of Jesus Christ of Latter-day Saints (LDS Church), Congregational, Christadelphians, Methodist, Nazarene, Presbyterian, Jehovah's Witnesses, Seventh-day Adventist, and Universal Church of the Kingdom of God, as well as Evangelical, Apostolic, and Pentecostal churches.

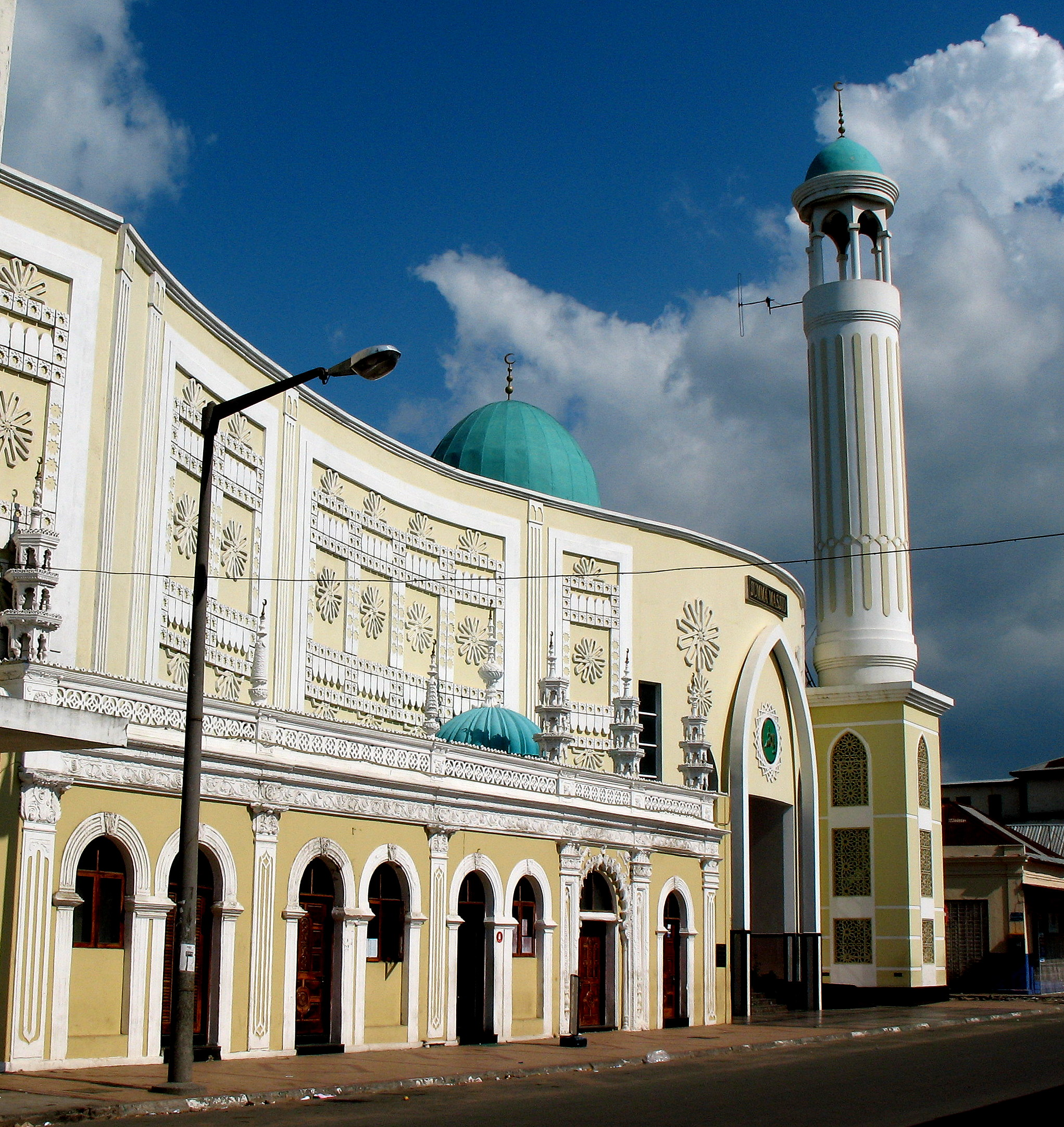
Maputo Central Mosque

In 2010, Muslim journalists reported that the distinction between Sunni and Shi'a was not particularly important for many local Muslims, and Muslims were much more likely to identify themselves by the local religious leader they follow than as Sunni or Shi'a. There were significant differences between the practices of Muslims of African origin and those of South Asian background. In addition, African Muslim clerics had increasingly sought training in Egypt, Kuwait, South Africa, and Saudi Arabia, returning with a more fundamental approach than the local traditional, Sufi-inspired Swahili Islam particularly common in the north.

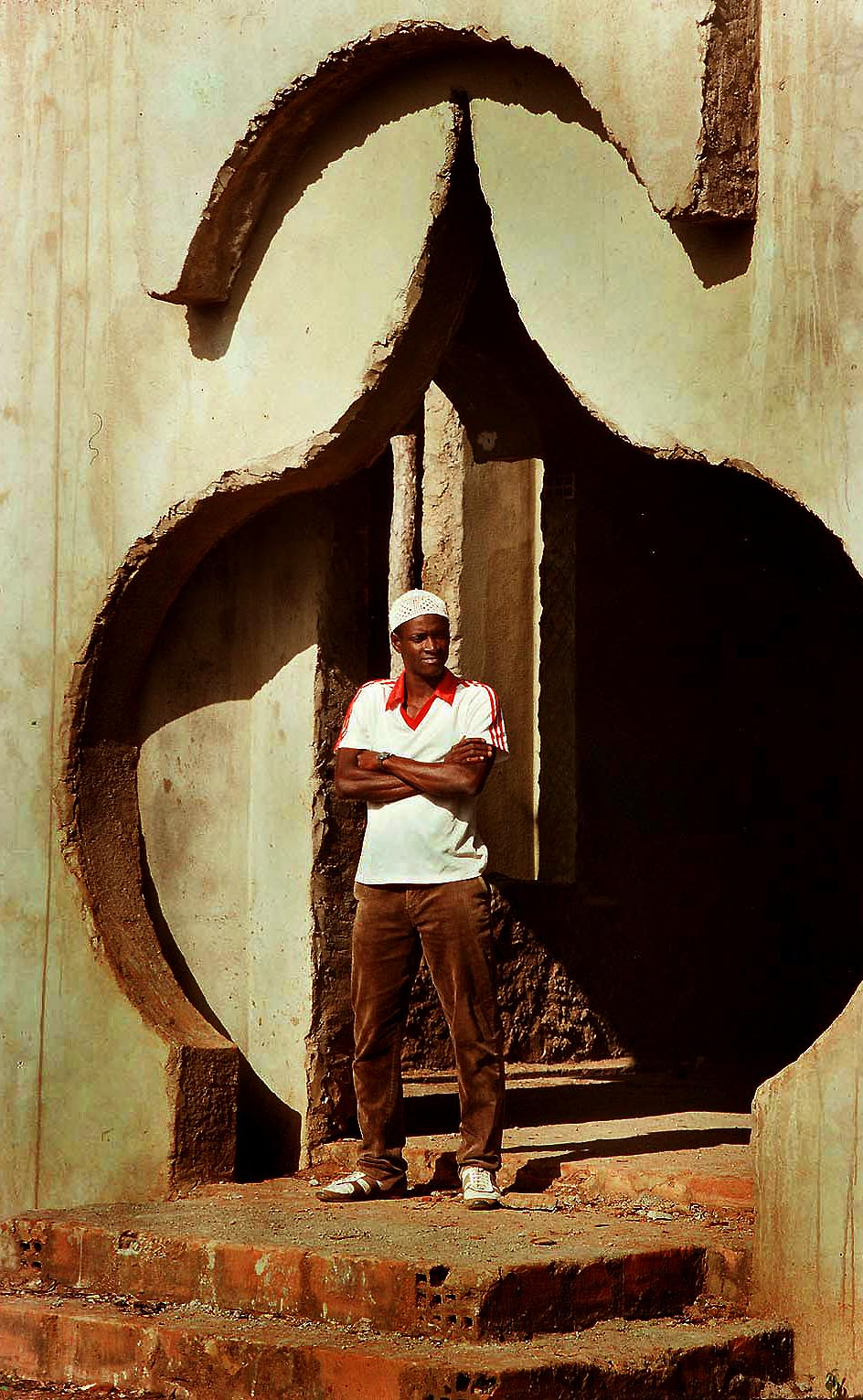
A Muslim worshipper awaits by the door of a mosque

In 2010, the Catholic Church and the country's leading mosques tried to discourage traditional indigenous practices from their places of worship, instituting practices that reflect a stricter interpretation of sacred texts; however, some Christian and Muslim adherents continued to incorporate traditional practices and rituals, and religious authorities were generally permissive of such practices.

=== 2020s ===
According to the 2020 ARDA estimate, 55.8% of the population of Mozambique was Christian, 17.5% was Muslim (mainly Sunni), 0.5% had no religion, 26.1% adhered to traditional beliefs, and 0.3% of the population practised other religions.

In 2022, Jewish, Hindu, and Bahá'í Faith groups constituted a very small percentage of the population.

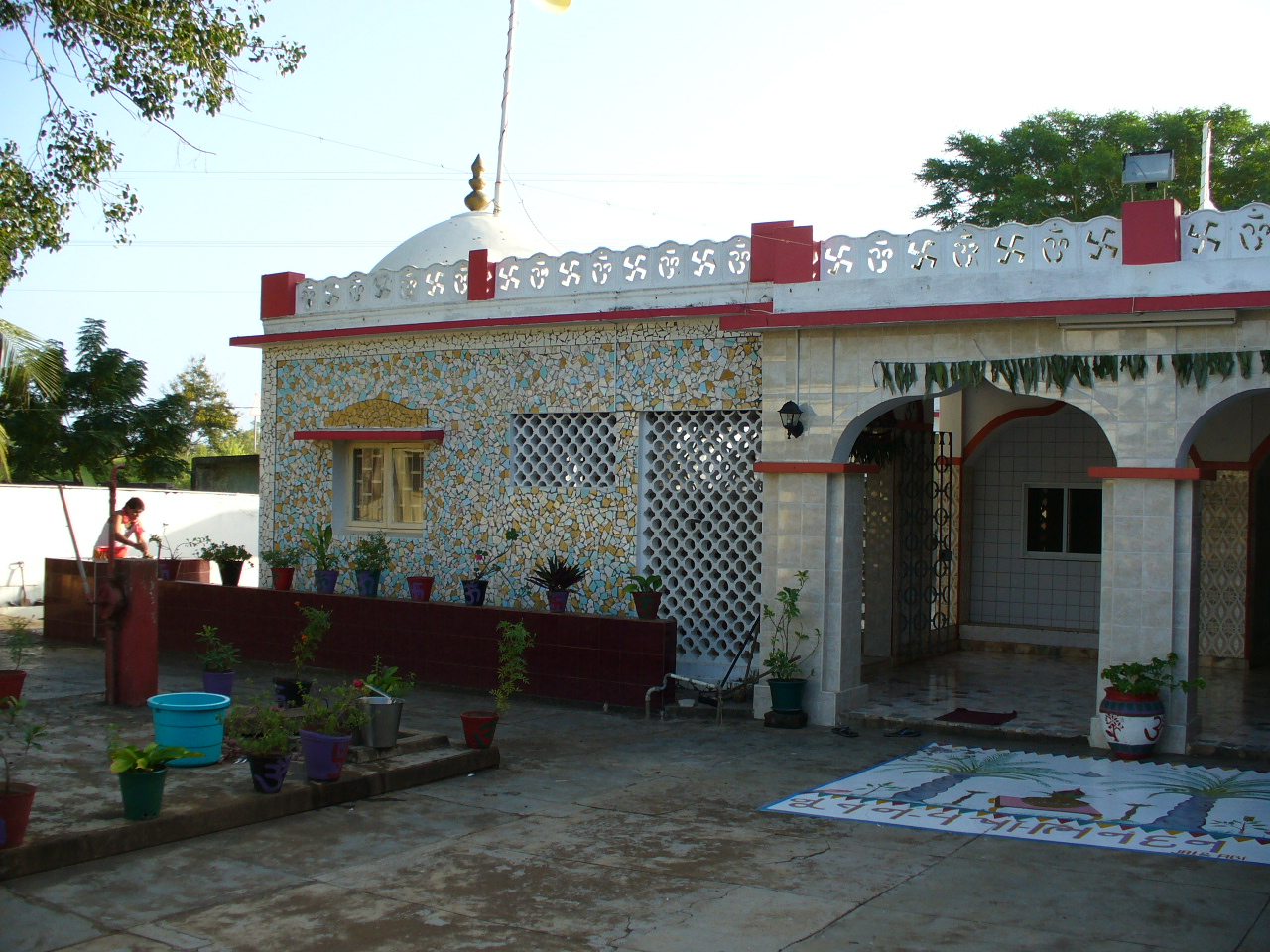
Hindu temple in Salamanga

According to 2020 data from the National Statistics Institute, the largest Christian groups and denominations in Mozambique are Evangelical and Pentecostal Christians, with 33 percent of the population, Catholics with 27 percent, and Anglicans with 2 percent. The remaining 14 percent claim no religious denomination. Many small, independent Catholic and Protestant churches that have split from mainstream denominations fuse African traditional beliefs and practices within a Christian framework.

== Freedom of religion ==
The Constitution provides for freedom of religion, and the Government generally respects this right in practice.

The country has been scored as 3 out 4 for freedom of religious expression.

Mozambique is listed as the 32nd most dangerous country to be a Christian. Islamist terrorists attacked a Catholic mission in Nampula, killing an elderly missionary and burning down several structures in September 2022, and separated Catholic inhabitants of a village killing at least eleven in September 2023.

== Survey and census results ==
Religious affiliation in Mozambique
Affiliation	1997 census	2007 census	2009 DHS Survey	2010 Pew Forum Estimates	2015 DHS Survey	2017 census	2022 Afrobarometer	2026 Afrobarometer
Christian	49.1%	56.1%	61.3%	56.1%	69.4%	62.0%	66.8%	68.6%
Catholic	23.8%	28.4%	32.3%	28.4%	30.5%	27.3%	17.3%	17.1%
Evangelical	7.8% (Note: In the 1997 census "Evangelical" included "Protestant".)	10.9%			9.5% (Note: In the 2015 DHS Survey "Evangelical" included "Pentecostal".)	16.7% (Note: In the 2017 census "Evangelical" included "Pentecostal".)	11.0%	10.3%
Pentecostal								6.7%
Zionist Christian	17.5%	15.5%	7.4%		10.3%	16.3%	5.4%	4.0%
Church of Christ								3.7%
Adventist								2.7%
Jehovah’s Witness								2.1%
Anglican		1.3%			0.8%	1.7%	3.0%	1.9%
Baptist								1.7%
Methodist								1.7%
Coptic/Orthodox								1.5%
Other Christian							16.6%	15.2%
Protestant			21.6%	27.1% (Note: The 2010 Pew Estimates included all Protestants.)	18.4%		13.5%	
Muslim	17.8%	17.9%	19.5%	22.8%	19.3%	19.1%	18.0%	21.3%
None	23.1%	18.7%	12.8%		9.9%	13.5%	12.3%	7.7%
Other/Unknown	10.0%	7.3%	6.4%		1.4%	5.5%	2.9%	2.4%
Notes

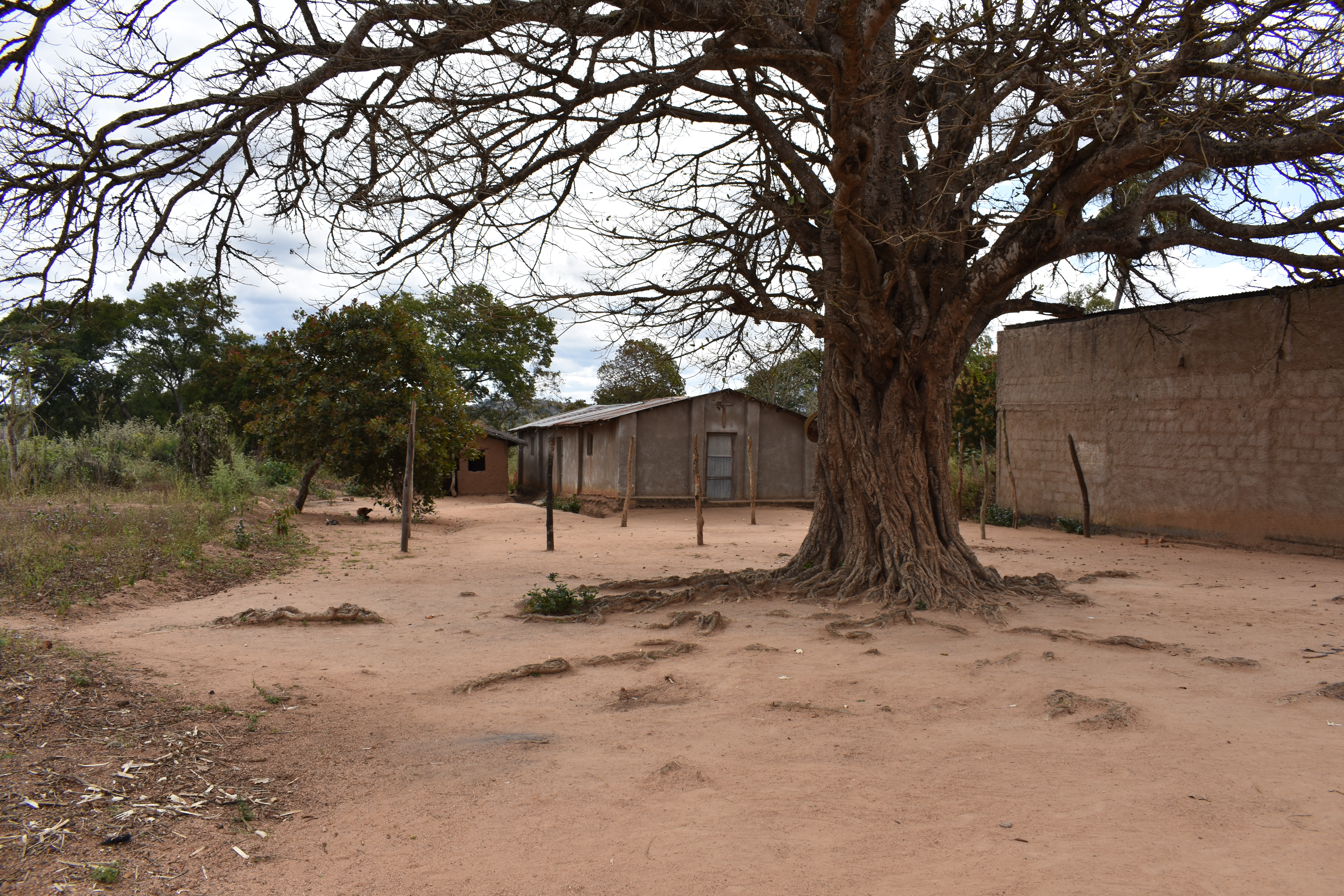
A mutholo tree, traditionally used as an altar by the Makua for ancestor veneration

== Anti-Religious Campaign 1979-1982 ==
The ruling Mozambique Liberation Front (FRELIMO), became predominantly Marxist during the liberation war. After independence, it declared state atheism and nationalized all schools and health facilities, including those owned and run by religious institutions. Facing resistance, the new state imprisoned some clerics in 1975 and 1976 and banned all Jehovah's Witnesses in the district of Zambezia in 1977.

In response to these and other social and religious changes, Catholic bishops condemned the death penalty and re-education camps as godless. In 1978, the church decided to transform into a church of communities, something the state believed to be a move towards resistance to Socialism, rather than the collaboration stated by some Bishops. The result was an outright attack on all religion on the part of the state.

From early 1979, the regime attempted to discredit the church on the basis of the history of the colonial church, and it began a campaign to close churches, prevent religious activities and restrict the movements of religious staff. Catholic and other religious institutions resisted, more or less openly. By 1980, resistance was often open and international criticism was rife, something which convinced FRELIMO to change its stance.

Several Protestant groups in Mozambique had strong allegiance to the FRELIMO government, potentially because many in the FRELIMO leadership (including the late national hero Eduardo Mondlane) had been trained in Protestant schools and the World Council of Churches had supported the Mozambique institute in Dar es Salaam during the war of liberation. But many non-Catholic churches suffered nonetheless, not least of all Jehovah's Witnesses, who were all deported to Zambezia, and the Nazarene Church, which saw many of its missionaries imprisoned.

Islam suffered probably the most during the anti-religious campaign, because of the plain misunderstanding or prejudice of the FRELIMO leadership. FRELIMO ministers thought, for example, that raising pigs was a good idea to combat rural underdevelopment and genuinely failed to understand that Muslims resistance in the north of the country came from religious objection. Some long-lasting trauma was thus created.

The anti-religious campaign of FRELIMO formally ended in 1982 when the party in power held a meeting with all the main religious institutions. On that occasion, it claimed mistakes had been made and national unity needed to prevail. State control of religious institutions continued after 1982, but the state attack on faith had come to an end.

== See also ==
- Catholic Church in Mozambique
- Bahá'í Faith in Mozambique
- History of the Jews in Mozambique
- Irreligion in Mozambique
- Islam in Mozambique
- Islamist insurgency in Cabo Delgado
- Protestantism in Mozambique
- Christian Council of Mozambique
