= Baháʼí Faith in Mozambique =

The Baháʼí Faith in Mozambique begins after the mention of Africa in Baháʼí literature when ʻAbdu'l-Bahá suggested it as a place to take the religion to in 1916. The first known Baháʼí to enter the region was in 1951–52 at Beira when a British pioneer came through on the way to what was then Rhodesia, now Zimbabwe. The Mozambique Baháʼí community participated in successive stages of regional organization across southern Africa from 1956 through the election of its first Mozambique Baháʼí Local Spiritual Assembly in 1957 and on to its own National Spiritual Assembly was elected in 1985. Since 1984 the Baháʼís have begun to hold development projects. The Association of Religion Data Archives (relying on World Christian Encyclopedia) estimated just over 2,800 Baháʼís in 2005.

== Early phase ==
In a series of letters, or tablets, to the followers of the religion in the United States and Canada in 1916–1917 by ʻAbdu'l-Bahá, then head of the religion, asked the followers of the religion to travel to regions of Africa; these letters were compiled together in the book titled Tablets of the Divine Plan. The publication was delayed until 1919 in Star of the West magazine on December 12, 1919. after the end of World War I and the Spanish flu.

=== Establishment of the community ===
Probably the first Baháʼís to enter the region were Eric and Terry Manton who landed in 1951–2 at Beira, a port of Mozambique, who came from Britain to be the first pioneers to what was then Rhodesia, now Zimbabwe.

In 1953 Shoghi Effendi, head of the religion after the death of ʻAbdu'l-Bahá, planned an international teaching plan termed the Ten Year Crusade. This was during a period of wide scale growth in the religion across Sub-Saharan Africa near the end of the period of Colonisation of Africa.

In April 1956 the Baháʼí Faith was present in small numbers across 15 countries of southern Africa. To administer these communities a regional National Spiritual Assembly was elected in South West Africa to cover them. Its region included South Africa, Mauritius, Reunion Island, St Helena, Bechuanaland, Basutoland, Northern Rhodesia, Southern Rhodesia, Nyasaland, Madagascar, Mozambique, South-West Africa, Angola, Zululand and Swaziland.

Another known early pioneer was Charlotte Pinto who attended a national convention of the Baháʼís of the United States on return from Mozambique in April 1957.

The Area Teaching Committee of Southern Rhodesia and Northern Mozambique held a conference on the progress of the religion chaired by Hastings Hojane in November 1958 and meetings continued through 1960.

By the end of 1963 a summary of the state of the worldwide community mentions the state in Mozambique as:

- Assemblies in Chi Hambanine(?) and Lourenço Marques (now Maputo).
- Registered Groups of Baháʼís in Inhambane, Malvernia (now Chicualacuala), and Matola.
- Isolated individual Baháʼís were known in Mocuba, and Quelimane.

== Growth ==
Following the death of Shoghi Effendi, the elected Universal House of Justice was head of the religion and began to re-organized the Baháʼí communities of Africa, by splitting off national communities to form their own National Assemblies from 1964 though the 1990s. In 1964 the regional assembly of South and West Africa had some 3,600 Baháʼís and 36 local assemblies. However, none of the Baháʼís from Mozambique were able to get passports to travel to Swaziland where the convention was held. Starting in 1967 the Baháʼí communities of several countries were re-organized away from the South and West Africa. From then Mozambique shared a regional national assembly with Swaziland and Lesotho which by then had about 2500 Baháʼís and 23 Assemblies. At this inaugural convention Rudolfo Duna from Mozambique was able to attend the convention in Swaziland. A regional conference held at Maputo in 1969, was conducted by the Goals Committee of Mozambique, with people coming from Boane, Machava (see Estádio da Machava), and Matola. The 1969 members of the local assembly of Lourenço Marques, later named Maputo, were: Rafael Mafuana, Jose Rodrigues, Rudoljo Duna, Justino Moreira, Fernanda Moreira, Rosie Mary, Emilia Rodrigues, Angelica Duna and Hagar Langa. This regional national assembly continued into 1970 and in 1971 Lesotho formed its own national assembly.

At the April 1972 inaugural convention of regional assembly of Swaziland and Mozambique the first sizable delegation from Mozambique had been able to attend – six attended - and they announced that translations into Makhuwa language had been accomplished. The 1972 members of the Swaziland and Mozambique national assembly were Jacob Mdiuli, John Allen, Benjamin Dlamini, Charles Ducker, Charles Caprez, Valera Allen, Margaret Shongwe, Ruth Dlamini, Angelica Duna. Also in later 1972 the first Hand of the Cause of the Baháʼí Faith visited Mozambique. Rúhíyyih Khanum traveled through Mozambique as part of a tour of many African countries. However she was only able to spend one night there where she met with a few of the Portuguese Baháʼís for an informal social evening in the lobby of the hotel she was staying at as there were restrictions on holding meetings. Following her trip, a Baháʼí in jail in Mozambique made some rings for members of the Universal House of Justice and Hand of the Cause Rúhíyyih Khanum which reached her while she was at the dedication for the Baháʼí House of Worship in Panama. She offered the ring for sale to raise money for the next temple to be built. In response a Hawaiian was moved to offer an emerald he had acquired and set in a gold setting. That ring was delivered to help raise funds and arrived among the Persian Baháʼí community where it raised many thousands more. From the original ring through the end the rings raised over $100,000 for the Lotus Temple in India.

In 1973-4 Mozambique was among the national communities that responded to a survey on status of women in the community which was tabulated and summarized for the 1974 Statement to the 25th session of the UN Commission on the Status of Women.

In early 1976 Angola was added to the regional assembly with Mozambique and Swaziland. In 1976 a compilation of prayers in the Yao language, a language spoken in Mozambique and countries to the north, was published through the regional national assembly. From December 1976 refugees from the Mozambican Civil War who returned to Portugal also had contact with the Baháʼí Faith.

In 1977 Swaziland elected their own national assembly and Angola and Mozambique continued with a shared assembly. From 1978 to 1992 Angola and Mozambique shared a regional national assembly. In 1985 the Baháʼís of Mozambique elected their first National Spiritual Assembly, witnessed by Continental Counselor Shidan Fat'he-Aazam.

=== Development projects begin ===
Since its inception the religion has had involvement in socio-economic development beginning by giving greater freedom to women, promulgating the promotion of female education as a priority concern, and that involvement was given practical expression by creating schools, agricultural coops, and clinics. The religion entered a new phase of activity when a message of the Universal House of Justice dated 20 October 1983 was released. Baháʼís were urged to seek out ways, compatible with the Baháʼí teachings, in which they could become involved in the social and economic development of the communities in which they lived. Worldwide in 1979 there were 129 officially recognized Baháʼí socio-economic development projects. By 1987, the number of officially recognized development projects had increased to 1482. In 1984 an agricultural project near Matola Rio with youth helping the community to cultivate the land around the Baha'i Center. In 1995 Baháʼís gathered with others to form a Forum of Religions, an organization for social and disaster relief.

== Modern community ==
In 2007 the Baháʼís cooperated in an anti-malaria project with a broad group of religions. Regional conferences were called for by the Universal House of Justice 20 October 2008 to celebrate recent achievements in grassroots community-building and to plan their next steps in organizing in their home areas. Just two weeks later twin conferences were held - one in South Africa and the other in Kenya. One regional conference was hosted by the National Spiritual Assembly of the Baháʼís of Kenya in Nakuru in November 2008 and attracted over 1000 Baháʼís - four of whom came from Mozambique.

=== Demographics ===
The Association of Religion Data Archives (relying on World Christian Encyclopedia) estimated just over 2,800 Baháʼís in 2005.

== See also ==
- History of Mozambique
- Religion in Mozambique
