= Musa ibn Bique =

16th-century Arab ruler of Mozambique island

Musa ibn Bique (Arabic: موسى بن بيق), other names Musa al-Big, Mossa al-Bique, Mussa bin Bique, Mussa ben Mbiki or Mussa ibn Malik, was ruler of the Island of Mozambique and wealthy Omani merchant, before the Portuguese took over the island in 1544.

== Background ==
Islam in Mozambique has a history that goes back to at least the tenth century. The records show that the region was known and well frequented by Muslim travelers and traders. Musa ibn Bique was considered to be a sheikh, that is, a person with authority in Islamic knowledge. The name of the island, and subsequently the entire African nation of Mozambique, was derived from his name. With Islam came the literacy into this land in the fields of poetry, history, commercial transactions, and other literary genres. By the middle of the fifteenth century, permanent and flourishing commercial and religious sultanates had been established along the coast and some had penetrated up the Zambezi.

== Legacy ==
Mozambique's first Islamic University, established in 2000, is named after him.
