= Islam in Mozambique =

Mozambique is a Christian majority country, with Islam faith practiced by around 20% of the population as of 2020.

The faith was introduced by merchants visiting the Swahili coast, as the region was part of the trade network that spanned the Indian Ocean. This later led to the formation of several officially Muslim political entities in the region. In fact, the name of modern Mozambique was derived from Mussa Bin Bique, an Arab merchant who lived in the island of the same name, which his name spelling was later adopted by the Portuguese for the entire country.

The vast majority of Mozambican Muslims are Sunni Muslims, with small Shia and Ahmadiyya minorities. The Muslims consist primarily of indigenous Mozambicans, citizens of South Asian (Indian and Pakistani) descent, and a very small number of North African and Middle Eastern immigrants.

== Pre-colonial history ==
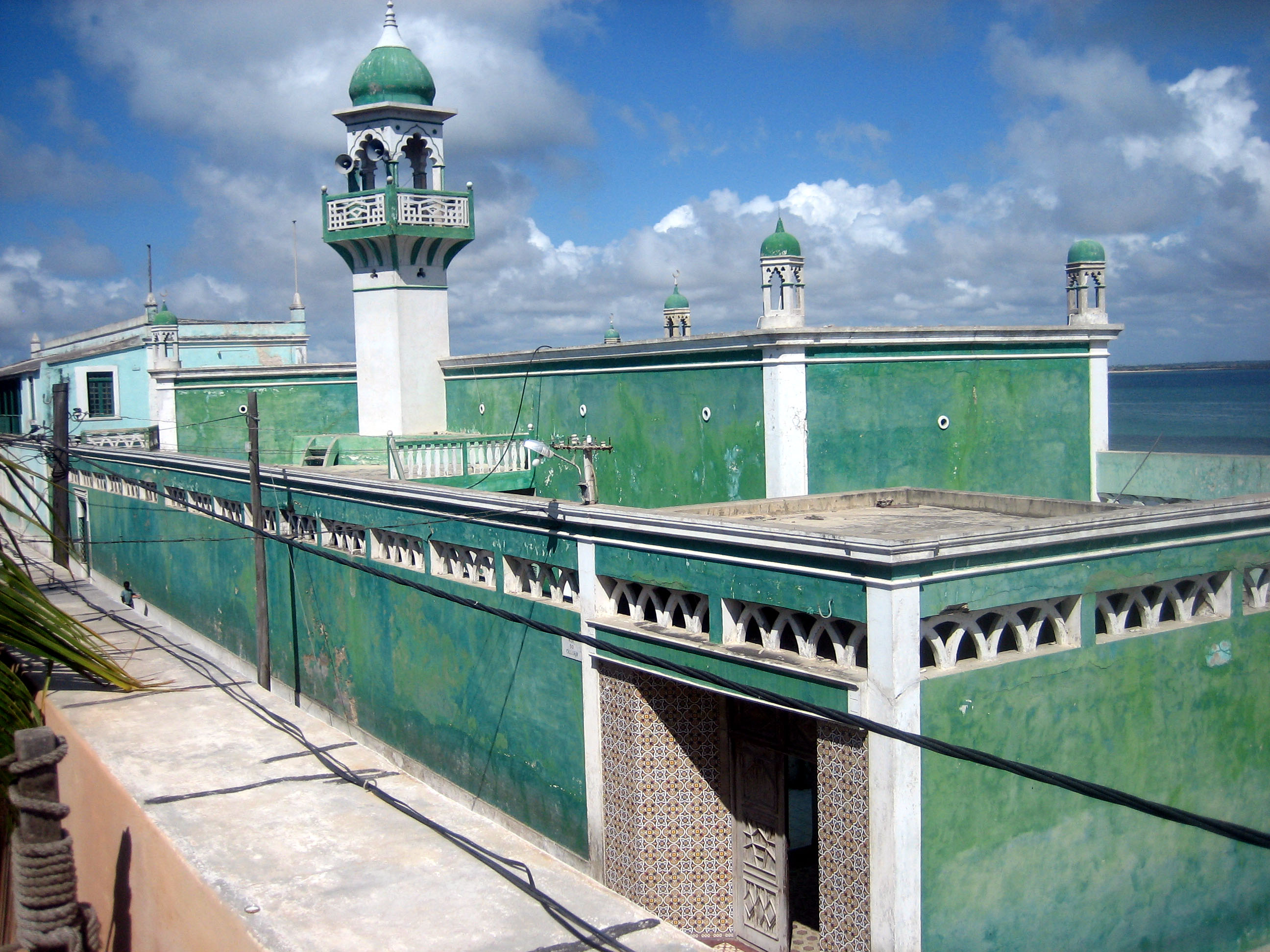
A mosque in Mozambique Island

Mozambique has long historic ties with the Muslim world. Initially by way of Sufi merchants, mostly from Yemen, and centuries after through a more organized system of coastal trading cities, more heavily influenced by the Ibadi Muslims from Oman along the shores of Eastern Africa.

The arrival of the Arab trade in Mozambique dates to the fourth Hijri century when Muslims established small emirates on the coast of East Africa. Links between Islam and the chiefly clans in Mozambique have existed since the eleventh century, when Islam made inroads into the northern Mozambican coast and became associated with the Shirazi ruling elites.

Since the founding of the Kilwa Sultanate in the 10th AD century by Ali ibn al-Hassan Shirazi, Islam had become a major religion in the region. The former port city of Sofala, which became famous for its trade in ivory, timber, slaves, gold (by way of Great Zimbabwe) and iron with the Islamic Middle East and India, was one of the most important trading centres on the Mozambique coast. Sofala and much of the rest of coastal Mozambique was part of the Kilwa Sultanate from Arab arrival (believed to be the 12th century) until the Portuguese conquest in 1505.

Muslims also established outposts inland along the Zambezi River at Tete and Vila de Sena. From these as well as Inhambane and Quelimane they would trade with the Mutapa Empire. Spreading Islam in Zimbabwe to the Lemba people, this continued until 1561 when Muslims at the Mutapa capital convinced the king to kill Gonçalo da Silveira after he attempted to baptize the court. In retaliation the Portuguese launched a large campaign with 1000 men in 1568 and the Swahili traders of the Zambezi were massacred with revolting cruelty.

In the 18th century there may've been a slow Islamic revival. In the 1720s, the Portuguese imposed a flurry of economically motivated restrictions on Muslim Indians at Mozambique Island. This was followed in I736 by a viceregal order from Goa against "the [Indian] Moors and Gentiles [Hindus] preaching their laws to the Cafres."

Several years later, the archbishop of Mozambique lamented Muslim success in conversion when compared with the failure of the church. He noted their easy access to Quelimane, Sofala, and Inhambane, citing especially the latter for the free exercise of the Muslim religion. Not surprisingly, soon he argued against Muslims exercising their beliefs at all. In 1750, new restrictions on Muslims owning slaves were imposed, claiming Muslim owners indoctrinated the slaves with "their damned Mohammedan faith." In 1759 five Indian Muslims were returned to the colonial capital from Inhambane, where they had organized Muslim schools for the local Africans. About the same time, the lieutenant-general of the Rivers complained bitterly that Muslim traders from Sanculo, a small polity on the mainland just south of Mozambique Island, were zealously preaching Islam among the Africans around Murambala, north of the Zambezi and east of the Shire rivers from Sena.

During the subsequent period of the Omani Al Bu Said dynasty, Muslim merchants expanded their trading zones south along the coast.

In the early 1800s a young Musa Quanto went on an extended proselytizing mission deep into the interior, as far as the north bank of the Zambezi and the valley of the Lugenda River. After travels to Mozambique Island, Zanzibar, the Comoros, and northwest Madagascar, he returned to Angoche in the 1850s. From 1862-1877 he tried extending the Angoche Sultanate militarily.

A report by the governor of Mozambique in 1852 refers to "the extraordinary Muslim advance, its infiltration into the interior, and respective miscegenation" In the 1870s and 1880s the Yao of northwestern Mozambique and southern Malawi embraced Islam en masse. Their towns became new centers for Muslim proselytization and Quran education.

The Portuguese found the success of Muslim proselytization worrisome, especially when contrasted with the failure of Roman Catholicism in gaining converts. In 1903 they sacked the town of the sultan of Angoche, destroying its houses, 15 mosques and 10 Qur'an schools - which had been teaching Arabic reading and writing to even the women of the area.

== Colonial history ==
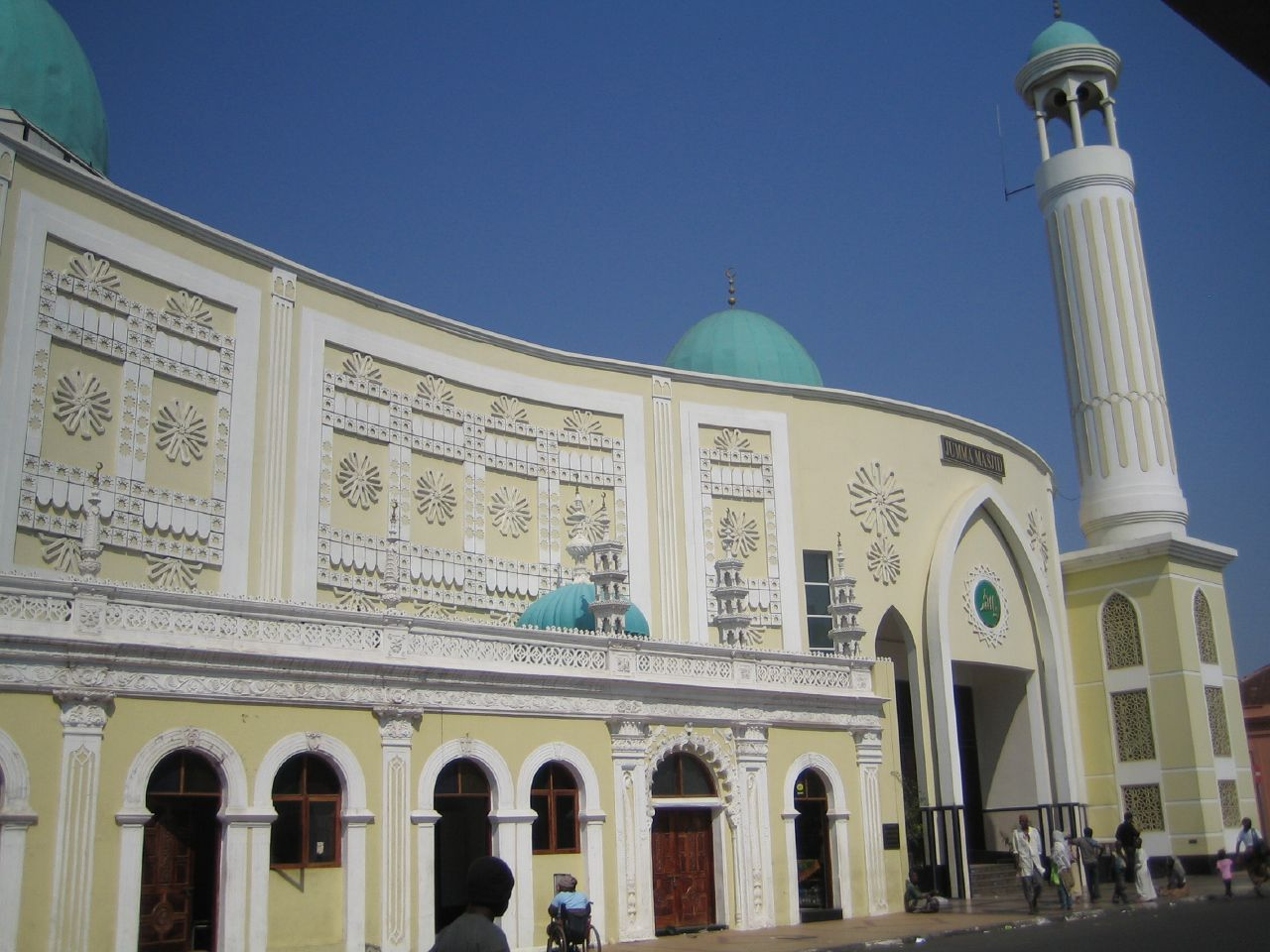
A mosque in Mozambique

Islam faced challenges in Mozambique during the colonial era. Since the Estado Novo period (1926–1974), Roman Catholicism has become the dominant religion following a formal alliance (Concordat) between the Church and the government. In March 1937 the colonial authorities took action against "the promoters of Islam," closing Quran schools and mosques in the major coastal towns of both districts under the pretense of "not having legal 'licenses,'" even though there were no other schools in the region. In September 1938, however, the ban was lifted. In the late 1960s, a survey of Islamic leaders throughout the entire colony found that 176, all from the north, recognized the sultan of Zanzibar as their Imam.

Only with the start of the War of Liberation did the state lower its opposition to Islam and try to accommodate the religion, in order to avoid an alliance between Muslims and the dissident liberation movement. In 1972 the Portuguese brought in the mufti of the Comoros, Sayyid Omar b. Ahmad b. Abu Bakr b. Sumayt al-'Alawi to resolve disputes between the 8 Mozambican tariqas and curry favour with the Muslims. Building upon this they published an official, Portuguese-language version of Muhammad ibn Ismail "al-Bukhari"'s hadith collection.

== Modern Mozambique ==
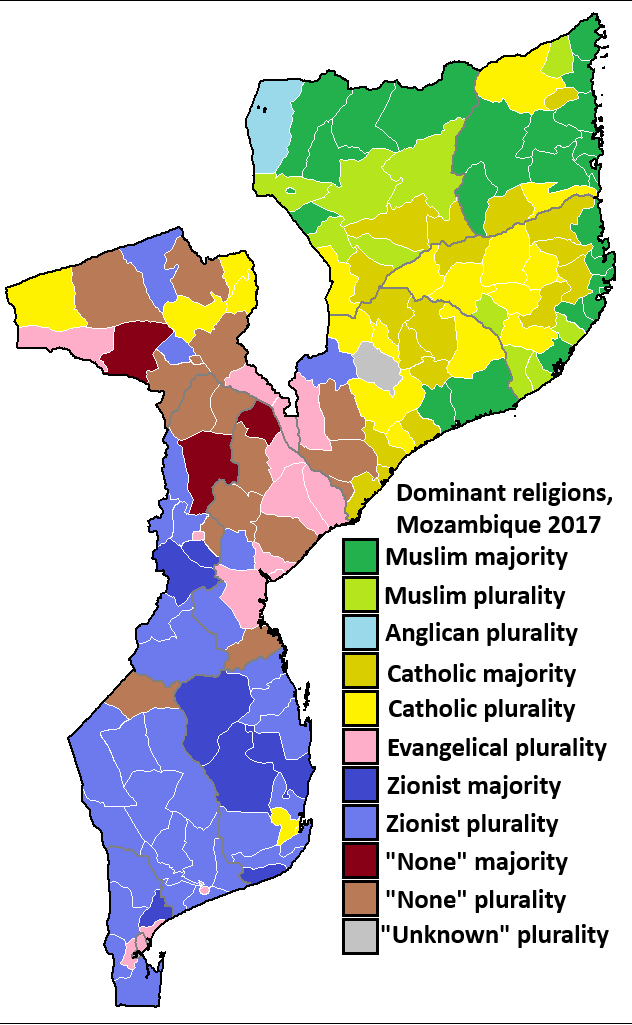
Dominant religion by district in Mozambique, 2017

In 1975 Mozambique's Independence under the secularist regime worsened conditions for muslims and the new government banned some Muslim associations in August 1976. In 1980, Mozambican Muslim students in exile in Dar es Salaam denounced the repression of Islam at home. Renamo was supported by Saudi Arabia and Oman due to Mozambique's treatment of its Muslims.

By late 1982 President Samora Machel created an opening for organized religion, including Islam, and in 1983 Frelimo officially recognized a new national Council of Muslims of Mozambique (CISLAMO).

Since the end of the socialist period (1989 onwards), Muslims have been able to proselytise freely and build new mosques. And the end of the 1990s Mozambique had become a member of the Organization of Islamic Cooperation (OIC). In May 1996, to gain more support from the Muslims, the government passed a law that recognized the Islamic holy days of Eid al-Adha and Eid al-Fitr as national holidays Muslims have also made their way into the parliament. Several South African, Kuwaiti and other Muslim agencies are active in Mozambique, with one important one being the African Muslim Agency. An Islamic University has been set up in Nampula, with a branch in Inhambane.

Rather than relying on the culturally loaded notions of a "chief" of régulo, the FRELIMO government has preferred to use the term "traditional authorities" to indicate a group of chiefs and their entourage of subordinate chiefs and healers. Realizing the social importance of this group, FRELIMO gradually reinstated "traditional authority."

While the Muslim leadership in northern Mozambique seems to have recovered the "traditional" side of their authority and power with legal reforms, they are still largely associated with chieftainship and African culture rather than Islam. Because of this they are barely able to access benefits or gain socio-political influence through Islamic platforms or organizations. This situation has been the source of their continual frustration and resistance to the alleged racial and cultural discrimination perpetrated by FRELIMO allied with southern Wahhabis, Afro-Indians, and Indians.

Whereas Sudan, for instance, had made sharia the law of the land, Mozambique has made attempts to recognize both traditional and religious marriages.

== Impact ==
From the arrival of Islam in the region, literacy rates among the locals via utilizing the Arabic script had risen by the late 19th century. Use of the script was often used for secular affairs like recording business transactions, writing local histories or creating literature. The script was used by diverse groups including the Swahili, non-Swahili Africans, non-Muslims, and women.

== Notable people ==
- Nazira Abdula, politician and pediatrist
- Amade Camal, MP from Nampula Province
- José Ibraimo Abudo, politician and former Minister of Justice
- Ossufo Momade, politician and RENAMO leader
- Abel Xavier, Portugal international footballer
- Abdul Latifo, Islamic cleric
- Khalid Cassam, agronomist, environmental scientist, and prominent sports administrator

== See also ==
- Religion in Mozambique
- Insurgency in Cabo Delgado
