= Mosque of the Companions =

Mosque in Massawa, Eritrea

- مَسْجِد ٱلصَّحَابَة
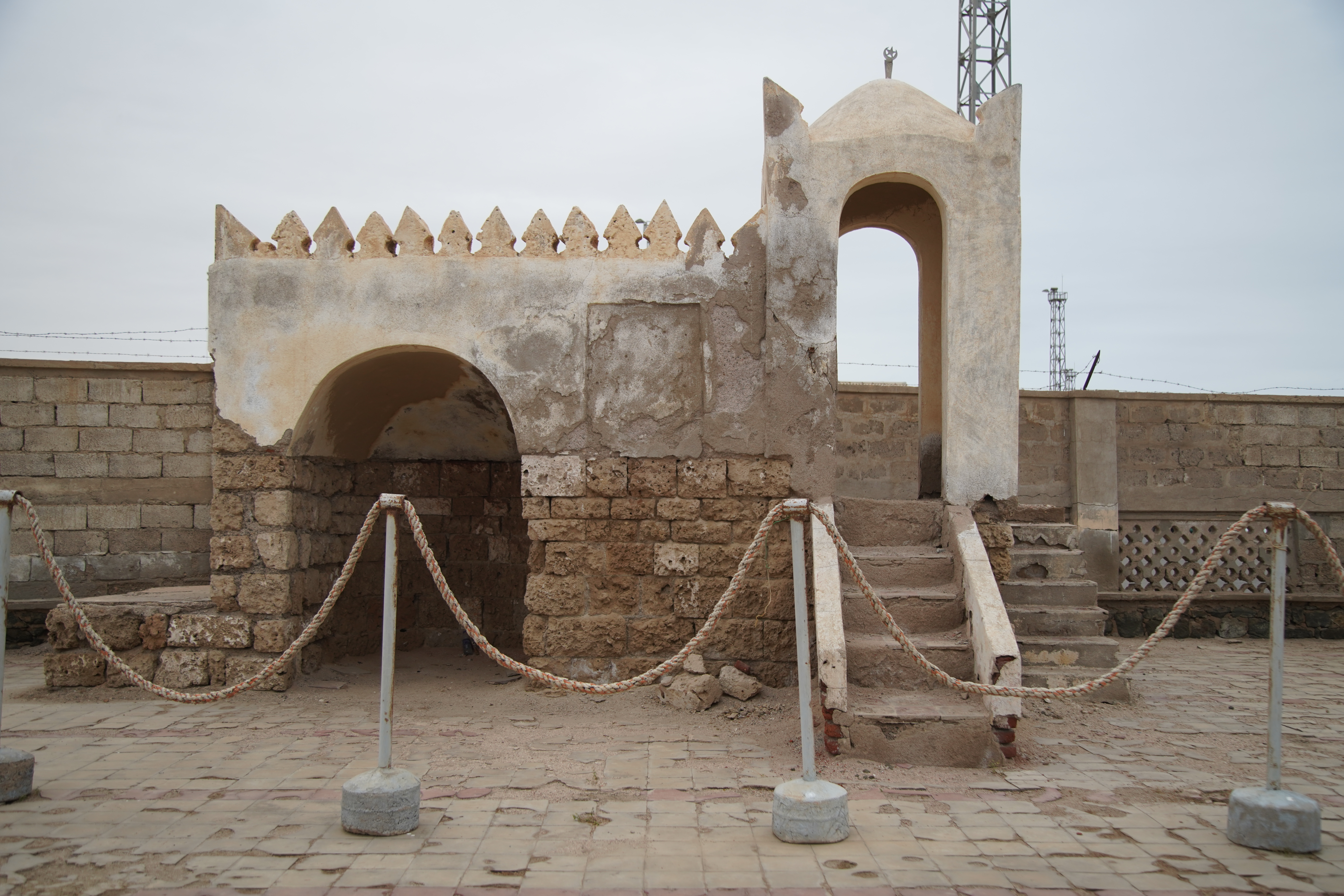

- Location of the mosque in Eritrea

Religion
- Affiliation: Islam
- Ecclesiastical or organizational status: Mosque
- Status: Active

Location
- Location: Massawa
- Country: Eritrea
- Interactive map of Mosque of the Companions
- Coordinates: 15°36′43″N 39°28′50″E

Architecture
- Type: Mosque
- Dome: 1

The Mosque of the Companions (Arabic: مَسْجِد ٱلصَّحَابَة, romanized: Masjid aṣ-Ṣaḥābah; Tigrinya: መስጊድ ሰሓባ, romanized: masǝgid saḥābā), also known as the Ras Medre Mosque, is an open-air mosque in Massawa, Eritrea, located on a small island off the Red Sea coast. According to local tradition, the mosque dates from the early 7th century CE and is believed by some to be the first mosque in Africa.

== History ==
Local Muslims generally believe that Massawa, particularly the small island known as Ras Medr off the city's coast, was the place where the Companions (Arabic: الصحابة, romanized: Ṣaḥābah) of the Islamic prophet Muhammad landed in Africa when they fled persecution by non-Muslims in the Hejazi city of Mecca, present-day Saudi Arabia. According to Richard J. Reid, the mosque may have been constructed in the 620s or 630s by members of Muhammad's family among this group.

The present-day site consists of an open-air prayer area (a musalla) with a free-standing stone structure that consists of a mihrab and an attached minbar that resembles a miniature minaret. This latter feature is very similar to one found in the nearby Mosque of Sheikh Hammali, built in the Ottoman period, which suggests that the structure also dates from this period or later.

== See also ==
- Islam in Eritrea
- List of mosques in Eritrea
- List of the oldest mosques in Africa
- Quba Mosque
