= Union of African Muslim Scholars =

African Muslim scholars organization

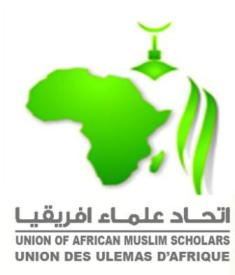
اتحاد

Union of African Muslim Scholars (UAMS; Arabic: اتحاد علماء إفريقيا) is an organization of African Muslim scholars headed by Said Bourhane, founded in 2011, and headquartered in Mali. Its vision is to be "a scientific reference point for reawakening of the Islamic community in Africa."

Scholars associated with the Union have participated in conferences organized by the Red Cross. In July 2011, the Union met with Amadou Toumani Touré and administration officials in Mali for the country's constitutive congress.

== Idea ==
The goal of the organization's founders was to create a union for the Islamic scholars of sub-Saharan Africa to serve as a scientific reference, be effective among African communities, strengthen the role of scholars and preachers in directing the community at all strata and levels, regulate fatwas, relate to the continent's events and represent Muslims locally, regionally and internationally. It aims to consolidate the efforts of African scholars and unify their ranks in order to lead the Muslim community in line with authentic Islamic teachings.

== Membership ==
As of April 2019, the Union has a registered membership of 512 Ulemas from 46 countries of sub-Saharan Africa.

== Constitutive Congress ==
The constitutive congress of the Union was held from 7 to 9 Sha'aban 1432H, or from 8 to 10 July 2011 in Bamako, capital of Mali in the presence of 132 delegates representing 39 countries. Attendees included members and observers of Islamic organizations and institutions outside of Africa, including a delegation from the Organization of Islamic Cooperation. The theme of the congress was "The role of the scholars in the consolidation of peace."

== Upcoming Projects ==
The Union has many projects they intend to complete within the next five years. These include building a headquarters for the Union in Bamako, establishing a website for the Union, launching satellite TV channels for West Africa and one in Swahili for East and Central Africa, opening four regional offices, organizing regional conferences, creating a database of scholars and scientific institutions in Africa, and creating a real estate waqf investment.
