= Islam in Zimbabwe =

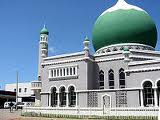
Kwekwe Mosque

Zimbabwe is a Christian majority country, with adherents of Islam being a small minority. Due to the secular nature of Zimbabwe's constitution, Muslims are free to proselytize and build places of worship in the country. Islam is the religion of less than 1 percent of the population of Zimbabwe.

== History ==
In the middle ages, the Muslims of the Swahili coast had contact with Great Zimbabwe. From their outposts at Sofala, Inhambane, Quelimane and along the Zambezi River at Tete and Sena they would bring luxuries from across the Indian Ocean to Zimbabwe in exchange for gold. Indeed, the economy of the great Kilwa Sultanate was dependant on the gold trade with Great Zimbabwe.

This continued with the Mutapa Empire, but the coming of the Portuguese began to strain relations. In 1561 Muslims at the Mutapa capital convinced the king to kill Gonçalo da Silveira after he attempted to baptize the court. In retaliation the Portuguese launched a large campaign with 1000 men in 1568 and the Swahili traders of the Zambezi were massacred with revolting cruelty.

After this Muslim presence in Zimbabwe declined. Although in 1630s the Mutapa gave granted a small territory to a Muslim Sharif. A decade later in the Torwa civil war of the 1640s many Muslims were killed. Thereafter any Muslims left in Zimbabwe gradually assimilated into the Shona culture. The only remnants of the former Islamic presence in Zimbabwe is in the fragments of Islamic influence among the Lemba peoples.

== Demographics ==
Estimates on the number of Muslims in Zimbabwe are around 136,000 as of 2020. The Muslim community consists primarily of South Asian immigrants (Indian and Pakistani), a small but growing number of indigenous Zimbabweans, and migrants from other African countries such as the Yao tribe of neighbouring Malawi. There are mosques located in nearly all of the larger towns. As a result of outreach efforts in rural areas, some chiefs and headmen have reportedly converted from Christianity to Islam.

== Remba (Lemba) ==
The Lemba or Remba are an ethnic group in Zimbabwe who have cultural traditions similar to Muslims in the Middle East, such as male circumcision.

== Famous Zimbabwean Muslims ==
- Mufti Menk – Grand Mufti of Zimbabwe, and was born on June 27, 1975. Mufti Menk is present on many social media websites, including YouTube.
- Ahmed Bilal Shah - Pakistani-Zimbabwean medical practitioner and television personality who was a presenter on ZBC TV.
- Sikandar Raza - is a Pakistani-born Zimbabwean international cricketer

== See also ==
- Religion in Zimbabwe
