= Protestantism in Mozambique =

Largest Christian Denomination in Mozambique

Christianity is the largest religion in Mozambique, with 62% of the population in 2023. More than half of these are evangelical and Pentecostal Christians.

== History ==
Since the Portuguese colonial period in Mozambique, the Catholic Church has been the main Christian group in the country, followed by various Protestant mission churches and African Independent Churches (AICs).

The American Board of Commissioners for Foreign Missions sent Protestant missionaries to the country in 1881. In 1882, the Church of Valdezia/Spelonken in South Africa sent Josefa Mhalamhala to start a Presbyterian Church in Mozambique. The Swiss Mission Church in South Africa also sent Rev. Paul Berthoud, who started two mission stations and a training institute in Rikatla.

== Modern day ==
Among the main Protestant churches in Mozambique are Igreja União Baptista de Moçambique, the Igreja Metodista Unida, the Labourers Chapel Mozambique, the Assembleias de Deus, the Seventh-day Adventist Church, the Anglican Diocese of Lemombo, Anglican Diocese of Niassa, the Igreja do Evangelho Completo de Deus, the Igreja Crista Evangelica Pentecostal (ICEP), the Igreja Presbiteriana de Moçambique, the Igrejas de Cristo, the Assembleias Evangélicas de Deus Pentecostais and the Evangelical Lutheran Church in Mozambique.

== See also ==
- Religion in Mozambique
- Catholic Church in Mozambique
- Christian Council of Mozambique
