= Mass media in Mozambique =

Regulation of Mozambican mass media across forms

The mass media in Mozambique is heavily influenced by the government. Information in Mozambique is relayed by means of television, radio, newspapers, magazines and the internet. Radio is the most popular form of media. Media outlets are regulated by the independent Supreme Mass Media Council.

== Print media ==
Mozambican newspapers have relatively low circulation rates as a result of high newspaper prices and low literacy rates. One study indicates that only 5 in 1000 people have access to newspapers. The two most popular daily newspapers are state-owned Noticias and the privately owned O Pais. State controlled newspapers such as daily Diário de Moçambique and weekly Domingo are also highly circulated. Other newspapers include Savana and Tempo. A weekly newspaper known as Verdade is distributed free of charge near the capital city Maputo and is known for its negative views on the government.

Noticias has the highest circulation rate at 16,000. Savana comes second with 15,000, while Domingo and Zambeze both have 10,000. Circulation is mainly confined to Maputo.

Most funding and advertising revenue is given to pro-government newspapers. However, the number of private newspapers with critical views of the government have increased significantly in recent years.

== Radio ==
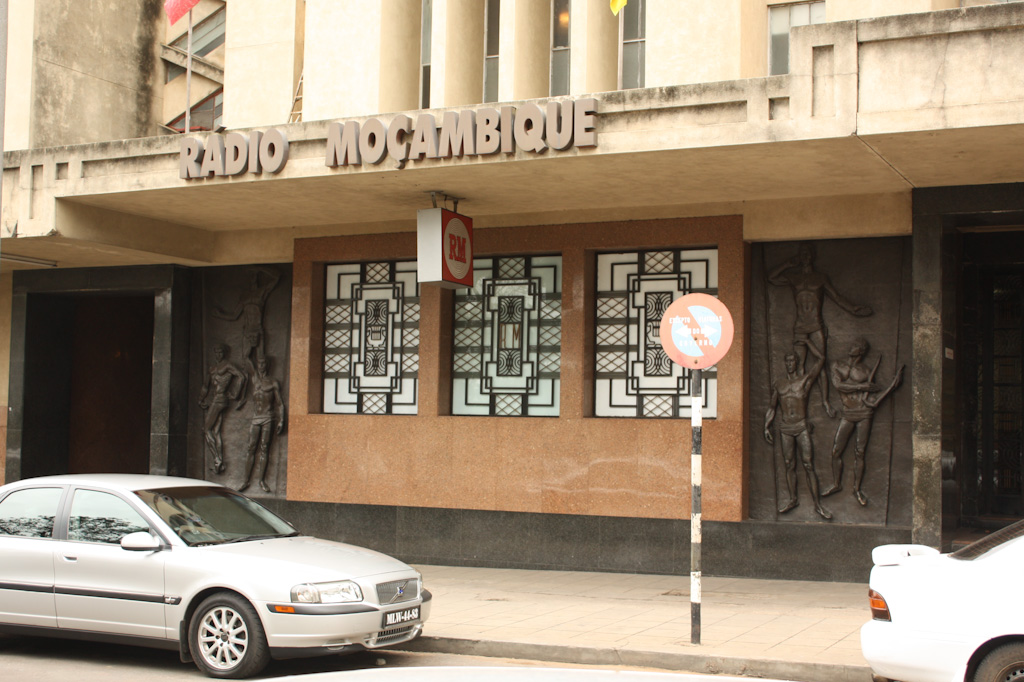
Headquarters of Rádio Moçambique in KaMpfumo district of Maputo (photo 2009)

Radio programmes are the most widespread form of media in the country. The most influential radio stations are state-owned, with most of the private radio stations having only a local audience. State-owned Rádio Moçambique is the most popular radio station in the country. It was established shortly after Mozambique's independence in June 1975 as a result of a merger between three other radio stations. In October of that year, LM Radio, the Afrikaans and English service of Rádio Moçambique was shut down and its facilities nationalized.

== Television ==
The penetration rate of cable television in Maputo is roughly 30%. Televisão de Moçambique, established in 1981, is Mozambique's only state-controlled television station. It is headquartered in Maputo. Approximately five privately owned stations are also headquartered in Maputo. Foreign television stations such as Portuguese state TV and Brazilian-based Miramar have high viewership rates.

== Internet ==
With only 4.8% of the population having access to the internet, Mozambique's internet usage is among the lowest in Africa. According to a report released in 2007, the capital Maputo had the highest internet usage rate, standing at 37.7%.

There are no government restrictions on access to the Internet, however, opposition party members report that government intelligence agents monitor e-mail.

== See also ==
- Mozambican literature
- Telephone numbers in Mozambique

== Bibliography ==
- "Mozambique", Freedom of the Press, USA: Freedom House, 2015, OCLC 57509361, archived from the original on 2 June 2019
