= Indians in Mozambique =

Indian diaspora community in Africa

Total population
- 70,000

Regions with significant populations
- Maputo · Island of Mozambique · Inhambane · Nampula

Languages
- Portuguese · Konkani · Marathi · Hindi · Telugu · Tamil · Gujarati · Kutchi · Kannada · Sindhi · Malayalam · Urdu · Memoni · Marwari · English

Religion
- Hinduism · Islam · Christianity · Buddhism · Jainism

Related ethnic groups
- People of Indian Origin

Indian Mozambicans form the sixth-largest Indian diaspora community in Africa, according to the statistics of India's Ministry of External Affairs. Roughly 70,000 people of Indian descent reside in Mozambique, as well as 870 Indian expatriates.

== Origins ==
India's links with Mozambique reach back over half a millennium. Indian Muslim traders from South India's Malabar region plied the trade routes of the Indian Ocean, bringing them up and down the eastern coast of Africa. Zhizo beads excavated from southern Africa and dated 8th-10th century AD are made using tube drawing methods which was specific to the Indian artisans, although scholars opine that beads were made by Indians residing in the Persian gulf or Omani coast where the ships would sail to southern Africa, scholars have also suggested Indian artisans resident at eastern African coast who received raw material and manufactured those beads at the local place. Blanche D'Souza states that Hindus had, by 1st millennium AD, begun using monsoon-led trade winds to establish trading activities between western parts of India and Mozambique, linking these to other eastern coastal regions of Africa and Arabian peninsula.

Arabic geographer Al-Idrisi (12th century) noted Indian settlements at Sofala and describes that settlements incorporated several towns, including Sayuna, which was;

medium in size and its inhabitants are a collection of people from Hind [India], Zunuj [Mogadishu according to Trimingham] and others….

— Al-Idrisi

Vasco da Gama also found Hindu traders in Mozambique when he paid the first Portuguese visit to ports there in 1499. By the 1800s, Vanika merchants from Diu had settled on the Island of Mozambique; in cooperation with Portuguese shippers, they were active in the trans-Atlantic slave trade. Muslim traders from the state of Kutch, closely allied with the Sultan of Oman, began to expand their activities in Southeast Africa in 1840, when the Sultanate relocated its seat of government to Zanzibar; they also bought and sold slaves in Mozambique, but shifted towards ivory under pressure from the British. Cashew nuts were another popular trade item.

More Gujaratis began to flow into Mozambique from South Africa in the latter half of the 19th century, also as petty traders or employees of the large Indian trading firms. Hindus from Diu and Sunni Muslims from Daman also came as masons and construction workers. Migration of all Asians was officially halted in 1899 due to an outbreak of plague, blamed on Indians; even after the relaxation of the restriction in 1907, Asians who sought to migrate to the colony had to pay a disembarkation fee of 3,000 reals at their port of arrival. Yet, with growing white hostility to the Indian presence in South Africa after 1911, more and more Gujaratis who had originally intended to settle in South Africa instead diverted north to Mozambique, especially in the area around Delagoa Bay.

== Great Depression and World War II ==
Indian cashew nut traders continued to prosper even during the 1929–1934 Great Depression, as the price of cashew nuts remained stable. However, migration again came to a stop due to restrictions put into place by the Portuguese government, who not only barred further immigration, but also prevented the return of British subjects of India resident Mozambique who were outside of the country at the time the new migration regulations were announced. British protests had little effect. This produced a significant change in settlement patterns; whereas many Indian migrants had effectively been sojourners, leaving their families in India while they did business abroad, they instead brought their wives and children over to Mozambique, thus cutting a bit more of their ties to their country of origin.

Furthermore, the Portuguese put into place indigenisation quotas which required that two Portuguese citizens be employed for every one non-indigenous worker in a firm. Indians circumvented the regulations by firing their non-trusted workers and naming the remaining ones as partners, so that they would not count towards the total number of employees. Some of the large trading firms eventually gave in and hired white Portuguese employees, typically women to work as shop assistants, or brought in workers from the Portuguese enclaves in India, while others continued to circumvent the regulations. This strategy would suffice through World War II, as Portugal's official neutrality meant that Portuguese ships remained untouched by either Allies or Axis, and trade volumes picked up. Though the price of cashew nuts dropped, warehouse owners and exporters were largely unaffected; suppliers were hardest hit, often going out of business and returning to paid employment.

== Post-war and independence ==
In 1948, the government countered the Indian strategy of reclassifying employees as partners by requiring that partners too be counted towards the total number of employees for purposes of calculating the racial quota. However, the 1950s saw further rises in cashew nut prices, so Indian firms continued to prosper. By the end of the decade, 12,000 Indians were living in the country.

Indian independence and Partition in 1947 had brought with it a choice for South Asians in Mozambique: Pakistani nationality, or that of the Republic of India. Most of the Hindus, as well as some of the Muslims, chose Indian citizenship. Some of the larger traders also took advantage of a third option, retention of British nationality. Finally, many registered their Mozambican-born children as Portuguese citizens. These choices would soon come to have large political significance. In response to the 1961 Indian annexation of Goa, the Portuguese interned all the Indian nationals in Mozambique in concentration camps, and froze their bank accounts by order of Portuguese dictator António de Oliveira Salazar. Though ostensibly done for their protection, in fact, the Portuguese hoped to use their freedom as a bargaining chip in exchange for the freedom of 3,200 Portuguese who had been captured in Goa. Among other effects, this spurred many of the Muslims who had initially chosen Indian nationality to switch their allegiance to Pakistan.

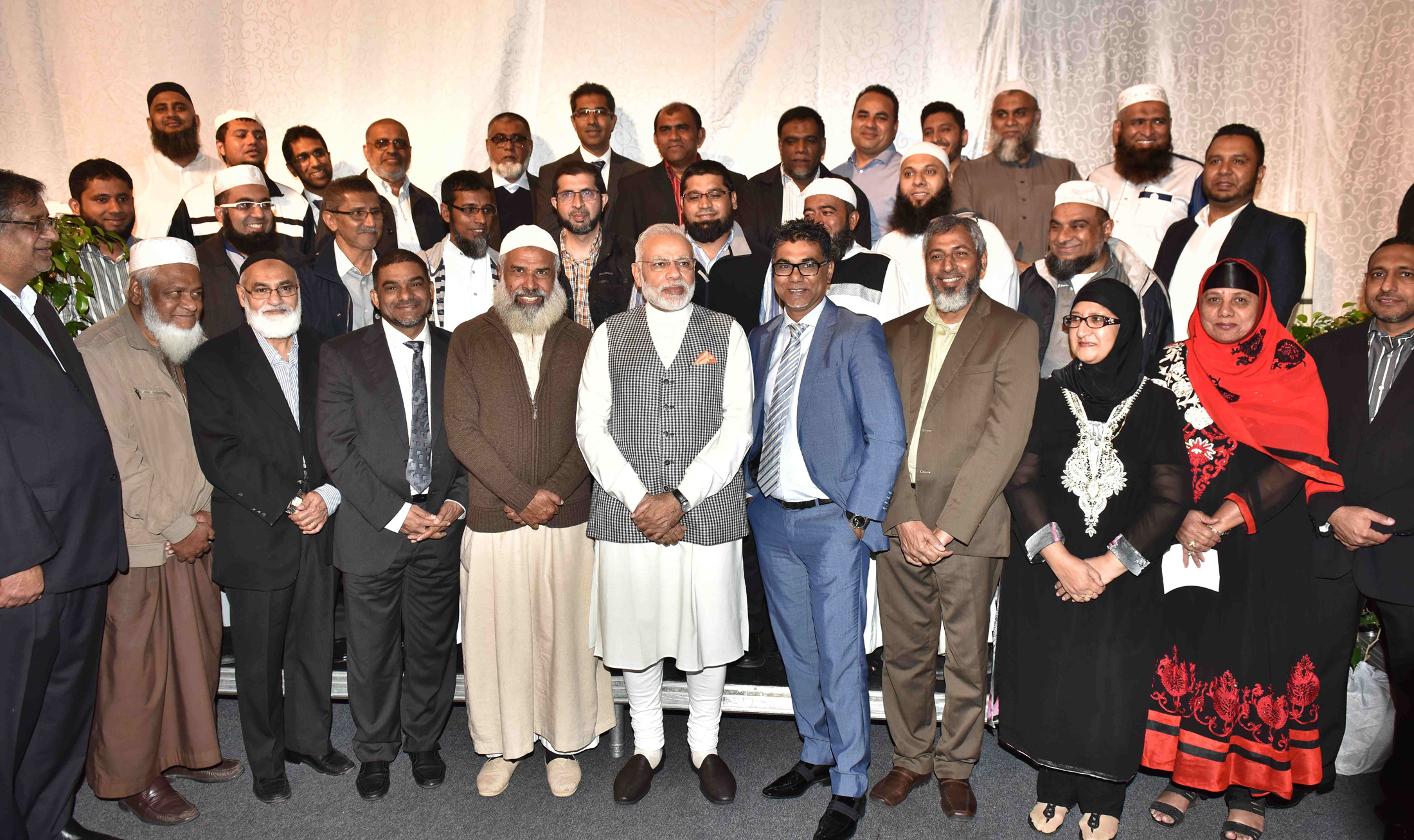
Indian Prime Minister Narendra Modi meets members of Indian community in Mozambique, 7 July 2016

A significant number of Indians even faced expulsion from the country, though the heads of the larger trading firms were spared this fate due to their symbiotic relations with the Portuguese elite: they traded economic freedom for political support. Even after the cessation of hostilities in Goa, Indian nationals in Mozambique continued to face restrictions by the colonial government. Some chose to resettle in other countries in Southeast Africa. Later, in the 1970s, as the process of decolonisation began and until the end of Portuguese rule drew near, South Asians began leaving the country in larger numbers; the outflow was especially significant among Ismailis, who were urged to leave by the Aga Khan IV. Some returned to India or Pakistan, while others re-established themselves in Portugal.

In contrast, large proportions of Sunnis and Hindus stayed in Mozambique after independence. With the increasing socialisation of the economy, they had to employ legally marginal strategies to remain in business and to send funds abroad, such as requesting their suppliers abroad to invoice them for more than the amount of goods sold. A typical pattern was that one member of the family would be asked to make a sacrifice and remain in the country to face the dangers of continuing to do business, while the others moved on to neighbouring countries, to Portugal, or back to South Asia.

== See also ==
- Indian diaspora in Southeast Africa
- Ethnic Chinese in Mozambique
- Demographics of Mozambique
