= United Baptist Church of Mozambique =

- Igreja União Baptista de Moçambique
- Classification: Evangelical Christianity
- Theology: Baptist
- Headquarters: Maputo, Mozambique
- Origin: 1970
- Congregations: 1,178
- Members: 400,000

The United Baptist Church of Mozambique (Portuguese: Igreja União Baptista de Moçambique) is a Baptist Christian denomination in Mozambique. The headquarters is in Maputo.

== History ==
The Church has its origins in 1921 with the building of a mission by the Swedish Scandinavian Independent Mission in Maputo. In 1970, the Evangelical Baptist Church and the Scandinavian Baptist Mission merged to form the United Baptist Church of Mozambique. According to a census published by the association in 2006, it claimed 1,178 churches and 400,000 members.

== See also ==
- Bible
- Born again
- Jesus Christ
- Believers' Church

== Bibliography ==
- Eric Morier-Genoud, Archives, historiographie et églises évangéliques au Mozambique, Lusotopie, Paris: Karthala, 2000, pp. 621–630.

- Eric Morier-Genoud, Arquivos, historiografia e igrejas evangelicas em Moçambique, Estudos Moçambicanos, Maputo: Université Eduardo Mondlane, n°19, 2001, pp. 137–154

- A.W. Wardin (ed.), Baptists around the World. A Comprehensive Handbook, Nashville (Tennessee), Broadman & Holdman Publishers, 1995 : 52, 53, 413.

- E. Hanson & B. Wennberg, Mission Genom Hundra År, Tidaholm (Sweden), Fribaptisamfundets Förlag, 1991.
