= Igreja Presbiteriana de Moçambique =

Igreja Presbiteriana de Mocambique
- Classification: Protestant
- Orientation: Presbyterian
- Scripture: Protestant Bible
- Theology: Reformed
- Polity: Presbyterian
- Associations: World Communion of Reformed Churches
- Founder: Yosefa Mhalamhala
- Origin: 1887; Mozambique
- Congregations: 350, plus 450 house fellowships
- Members: 100,000

Igreja Presbiteriana de Moçambique is one of the largest Protestant denominations of Mozambique.

== History ==
The Presbyterian Church in Mozambique was started by Mozambicans, who heard the gospel in South Africa. Yosefa Mhalamhala converted to the Reformed faith, and went back to Mozambique in 1880. In 1882 an African church was born. In 1887 the Swiss missionaries joined the African Church and founded the Swiss Mission. Since then it was known as simply the Swiss mission. It has established schools, hospitals and agricultural settings. In 1948 it became independent. It is a Presbyterian church.

The denomination was founded by Swiss missionaries especially Paul Bertaud. In the early years the church operated in the provinces of Maputo and Gaza but today it spread across the country. By 1948 the church become autonomous and self-supporting. In 1972 the first Synod president and several other members was arrested by the Portuguese authorities. In 1998 the denomination celebrated its 50th anniversary. In July, 2012 the denomination celebrated the 125th anniversary.

== Statistics ==
In 2004 it had 350 congregations, 400 house missions and 100,000 members. The church is stronger in the southern regions. Mozambique is among the countries which has a history of persecution of Christians.

== Doctrine ==
The denomination adheres to the Apostle Creed, Nicene Creed and the Heidelberg Catechism. It has Presbyterian church government with Presbyteries, Synods and the General Assembly.

== Interchurch organisations ==
The Presbyterian Church in Mozambique is a member of the World Communion of Reformed Churches.
