= Mozambique =

Country in Southeast Africa

Republic of Mozambique República de Moçambique (Portuguese)
- Flag Emblem
- Anthem: Pátria Amada (Portuguese) "Beloved Homeland"
- Capital and largest city: Maputo; 25°57′S 32°35′E
- Official languages: Portuguese
- Recognised regional languages: Tsonga, Makhuwa, Sena, Lomwe, Swahili
- Ethnic groups (2017): 99.0% African (Note: Includes Makhuwa, Tsonga, Lomwe, Sena, and other African ethnic groups.); 0.8% Mestiço; 0.1% White; 0.1% other (Note: Includes those of Asian descent)
- Religion (2017): 62.0% Christianity; 27.3% Catholic; 16.7% Evangelical; 16.3% Zionist churches; 1.7% Anglican; 19.1% Islam; 13.5% no religion; 4.3% other religions (Note: Includes Traditional faiths, Judaism, Hinduism, and Baha'i.); 1.2% unknown
- Demonym: Mozambican
- Government: Unitary dominant-party semi-presidential republic under an authoritarian government
  - President: Daniel Chapo
  - Prime Minister: Maria Benvinda Levy
- Legislature: Assembly of the Republic

Independence from Portugal
  - Portuguese Mozambique: 1505–1975
  - Mozambican War of Independence: 25 September 1964 – 8 September 1974
  - Granted independence: 25 June 1975
  - People's Republic of Mozambique: 25 June 1975 - 30 November 1990
  - Civil War: 1977–1992
  - Current constitution: 21 December 2004

Area
  - Total: 801,590 km^{2} (309,500 sq mi) (35th)
  - Water (%): 2.2

Population
  - 2024 estimate: ▲34,881,007 (45th)
  - Density: 43.5/km^{2} (112.7/sq mi) (176th)
- GDP (PPP): 2025 estimate
  - Total: ▲$61.950 billion (126th)
  - Per capita: ▲$1,730 (182nd)
- GDP (nominal): 2025 estimate
  - Total: ▲$23.770 billion (120th)
  - Per capita: ▲$663 (183rd)
- Gini (2022): ▼49.6 high inequality
- HDI (2023): ▲0.493 low (183rd)
- Currency: Metical (MZN)
- Time zone: UTC+2 (CAT)
- Calling code: +258
- ISO 3166 code: MZ
- Internet TLD: .mz
- Website portaldogoverno.gov.mz

Mozambique, (Note: /ˌmoʊzæmˈbiːk/; Portuguese: Moçambique, pronounced [musɐ̃ˈbikɨ]; Chichewa: Mozambiki; Tsonga: Muzambhiki; Swahili: Msumbiji) officially the Republic of Mozambique, (Note: República de Moçambique, pronounced [ʁɛˈpuβlikɐ ðɨ musɐ̃ˈbikɨ]) is a country in Southeast Africa bordered by the Indian Ocean to the east, Tanzania to the north, Malawi and Zambia to the northwest, Zimbabwe to the west, and Eswatini and South Africa to the south and southwest. The sovereign state is separated from the Comoros, Mayotte, and Madagascar through the Mozambique Channel to the east. The capital and largest city is Maputo.

Between the 7th and 11th centuries, a series of Swahili port towns developed in the area, which contributed to the development of a distinct Swahili culture and dialect. In the late medieval period, these towns were frequented by traders from Somalia, Ethiopia, Egypt, Arabia, Persia, and India. The voyage of Vasco da Gama in 1498 marked the arrival of the Portuguese, who began a gradual process of colonisation and settlement in 1505. After over four centuries of Portuguese rule, Mozambique gained independence in 1975, becoming the People's Republic of Mozambique shortly thereafter. After only two years of independence, the country descended into an intense and protracted civil war lasting from 1977 to 1992. In 1994, Mozambique held its first multiparty elections and has since remained a relatively stable presidential republic, although it still faces a low-intensity insurgency mainly in the furthest regions from the southern capital and where Islam is the dominant faith.

Mozambique is endowed with rich and extensive natural resources. The economy is based chiefly on fishery—mostly molluscs, crustaceans and echinoderms—and agriculture, with a growing industry of food and beverages, chemical manufacturing, aluminium and oil. The tourism sector is expanding. Gross domestic product grew significantly after 2001, but since 2014/15, both a significant decrease in household real consumption and a sharp rise in economic inequality have been observed. The nation remains one of the poorest and least developed countries in the world, ranking low in GDP per capita, human development, measures of inequality and average life expectancy.

The population of around 34,777,605 (as of 2024 estimates; a 2.96% increase from 2023) consists of more than 2,000 ethnic groups and is composed overwhelmingly of Bantu peoples. However, the only official language is Portuguese, which is spoken in urban areas as a first or second language by most, and generally as a lingua franca between younger Mozambicans with access to formal education. The most important local languages include Tsonga, Makhuwa, Sena, Chichewa, and Swahili. Glottolog lists 46 languages spoken in the country, of which one is a signed language (Mozambican Sign Language/Língua de sinais de Moçambique). The most popular religion in Mozambique is Christianity, with significant minorities following Islam and other African traditional religions.

== Etymology ==
The country was named Moçambique by the Portuguese after the Island of Mozambique, derived from Musa ibn Bique, an Arab trader who first visited the island and later lived there and was its ruler when Vasco da Gama called at the island in 1498. The island-town was the capital of the Portuguese colony until 1898, when it was moved south to Lourenço Marques (now Maputo).

== History ==
=== Bantu migrations ===
Bantu-speaking peoples migrated into Southeast Africa as early as the 4th century BC. It is believed between the 1st and 5th centuries AD, waves of migration from the west and north went through the Zambezi River valley and then gradually into the plateau and coastal areas of Southern Africa. They established agricultural communities or societies based on herding cattle. They brought with them the technology for smelting and smithing iron.

=== Swahili coast ===
From the late first millennium AD, vast Indian Ocean trade networks extended as far south as present day Vilankulo, as evidenced by the ancient port town of Chibuene. Beginning in the 9th century, a growing involvement in Indian Ocean trade led to the development of numerous port towns along the entire East African coast. Largely autonomous, these towns broadly participated in the incipient Swahili culture. Islam was often adopted by urban elites, facilitating trade. Sofala, Angoche, and Mozambique Island were regional powers by the 15th century.

The towns traded with merchants from both the African interior and the broader Indian Ocean world. Particularly important were the gold and ivory caravan routes. Inland states like the Kingdom of Great Zimbabwe and the Mutapa Empire provided the coveted gold and ivory, which were then exchanged up the coast to larger port cities like Kilwa and Mombasa.

There is allegedly a tomb from Sancul cemetery bearing an Arabic inscription dated to 1313 or 1314 AD (713 AH) according to a third-hand report, although others estimate that the graves are no earlier than the 19th century.

=== Portuguese Mozambique (1498–1960) ===
The voyage of Vasco da Gama around the Cape of Good Hope in 1498 marked the Portuguese entry into trade, politics, and society of the region. The Portuguese gained control of the Island of Mozambique and the port city of Sofala in the early 16th century. and by the 1530s, small groups of Portuguese traders and prospectors seeking gold penetrated the interior regions. Here they set up garrisons and trading posts at Sena and Tete on the Zambezi and tried to gain exclusive control over the gold trade. From about 1500, there are surviving letters in Arabic between Mozambican and Portuguese rulers, including a 1517 letter from Sharif Muhammad al-Alawi, the ruler of Mozambique Island to Manuel I, king of Portugal. Beginning in this period, Portuguese trading posts and forts displaced the Arabic commercial and military hegemony, becoming regular ports of call on the new European sea route to the east, the first steps in what was to become a process of colonisation.

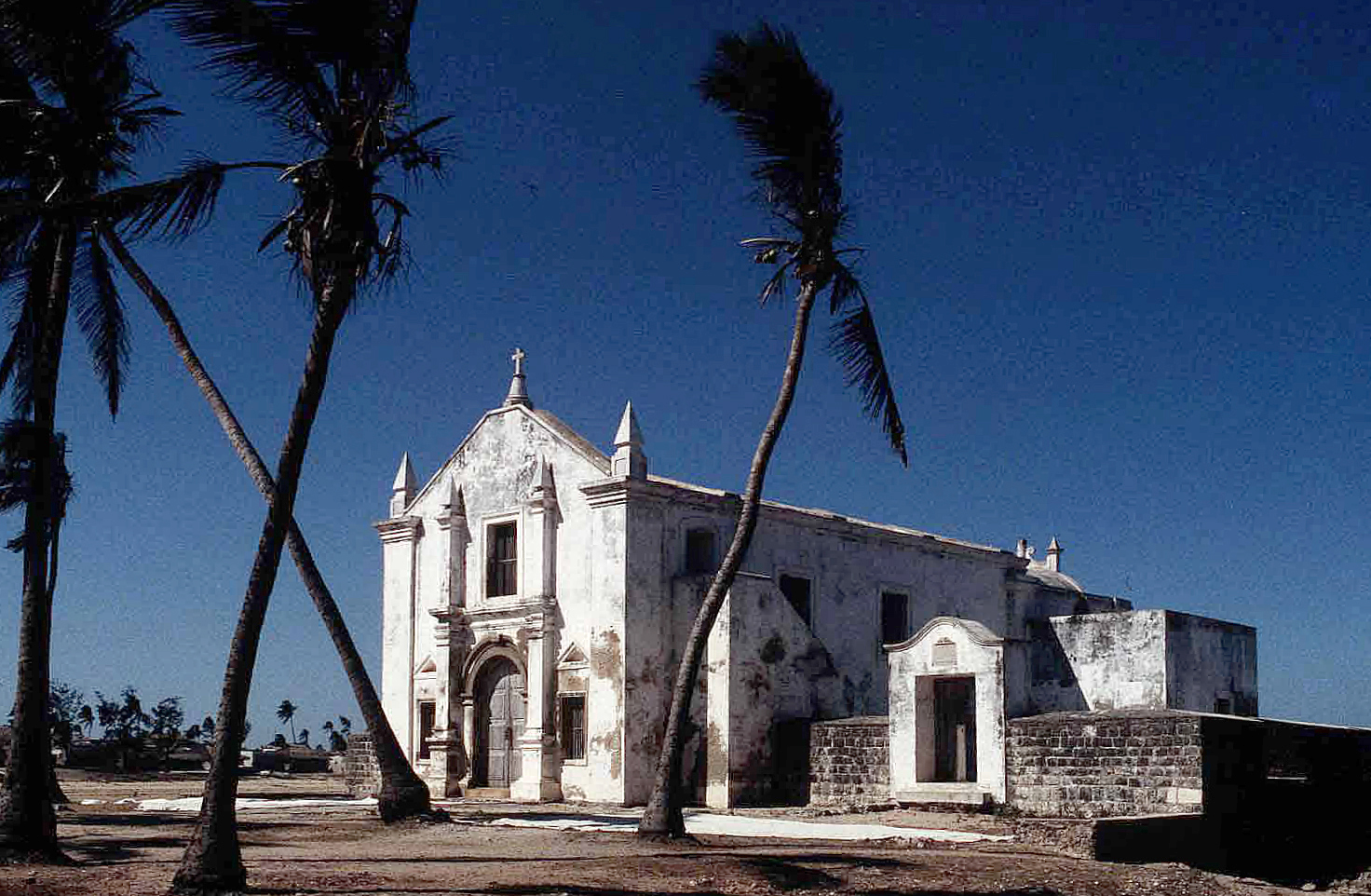
Detail of the Island of Mozambique, former capital in Northern Mozambique and prominent in the country's history Mozambican dhow Arab-Swahili slave traders and their captives on the Ruvuma River Portuguese language printing and typesetting class, 1930 View of the Central Avenue in Lourenço Marques, now Maputo, ca. 1905 Fort São Sebastião

In the central part of the Mozambique territory, the Portuguese attempted to legitimise and consolidate their trade and settlement positions through the creation of prazos. These land grants tied emigrants to their settlements, and inland Mozambique was largely left to be administered by prazeiros, the grant holders, while central authorities in Portugal concentrated their direct exercise of power on, in their view, the more important Portuguese possessions in Asia and the Americas.

Slavery pre-dated European contact. African rulers and chiefs dealt in enslaved people, first with Arab Muslim traders who sent the enslaved to Middle East Asia cities and plantations, and later with Portuguese and other European traders. In a continuation of the trade, slaves were supplied by warring local African rulers, who raided enemy tribes and sold their captives to the prazeiros. The authority of the prazeiros was exercised and upheld amongst the local population by armies of these enslaved men, whose members became known as chikunda. Continued emigration from Portugal occurred at comparatively low levels until late in the nineteenth century, promoting "Africanisation". While prazos were originally intended to be held solely by Portuguese colonists, through intermarriage and the relative isolation of prazeiros from ongoing Portuguese influences, the prazos became African-Portuguese or African-Indian.

Although Portuguese influence gradually expanded, its power was limited and exercised through individual settlers and officials who were granted extensive autonomy. The Portuguese were able to wrest much of the coastal trade from Arab Muslims by the 18th century, but with the Arab Muslim seizure of Portugal's key foothold at Fort Jesus on Mombasa Island (now in Kenya) in 1698, the pendulum began to swing in the other direction. As a result, investment lagged while Lisbon devoted itself to the more lucrative trade with India and the Far East and to the colonisation of Brazil.

The Mazrui and Omani Arabs reclaimed much of the Indian Ocean trade, forcing the Portuguese to retreat south. Many prazos had declined by the mid-19th century, but several of them survived. During the 19th century other European powers, particularly the British (British South Africa Company) and the French (Madagascar), became increasingly involved in the trade and politics of the region around the Portuguese East African territories.

By the early 20th century the Portuguese had shifted the administration of much of Mozambique to large private companies, like the Mozambique Company, the Zambezia Company and the Niassa Company, controlled and financed mostly by British financiers such as Solomon Joel, which established railroad lines to their neighbouring colonies (South Africa and Rhodesia). Although slavery had been legally abolished, at the end of the 19th century the chartered companies enacted a forced labour policy and supplied cheap—often forced—African labour to the mines and plantations of the nearby British colonies and South Africa. The Zambezia Company, the most profitable chartered company, took over several smaller prazeiro holdings and established military outposts to protect its property. The chartered companies built roads and ports to bring their goods to market including a railroad linking present-day Zimbabwe with the port of Beira.

Due to their unsatisfactory performance and the shift, under the corporatist Estado Novo regime of Oliveira Salazar, toward stronger state control of the Portuguese Empire's economy, the companies' concessions were not renewed when they ran out. This was what happened in 1942 with the Mozambique Company, which, however, continued to operate in the agricultural and commercial sectors as a corporation, and had already happened in 1929 with the termination of the Niassa Company's concession. In 1951, the Portuguese overseas colonies in Africa were rebranded as Overseas Provinces of Portugal.

=== Mozambican War of Independence (1961–1974) ===
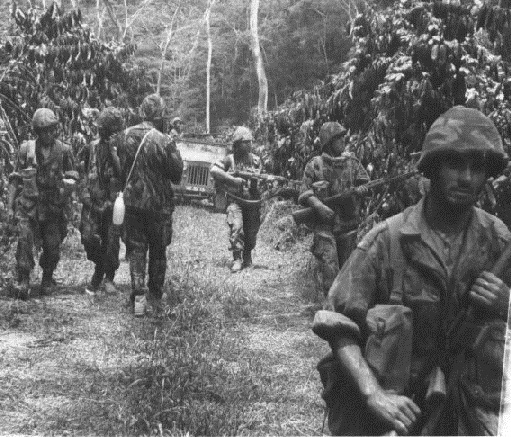
Portuguese troops during the Portuguese Colonial War, some loading FN FAL, AR-10 and H&K G3

As communist and anti-colonial ideologies spread out across Africa, many clandestine political movements were established in support of Mozambican independence. These movements claimed that since policies and development plans were primarily designed by the ruling authorities for the benefit of the Portuguese population, little attention was paid to tribal integration and the development of native communities. According to the official guerrilla statements, this affected a majority of the indigenous population who suffered both state-sponsored discrimination and enormous social pressure.

The Front for the Liberation of Mozambique (FRELIMO) initiated a guerrilla campaign against Portuguese rule in September 1964. This conflict—along with the two others already initiated in the other Portuguese colonies of Angola and Portuguese Guinea—became part of the so-called Portuguese Colonial War (1961–1974). From a military standpoint, the Portuguese regular army maintained control of the population centres while the guerrilla forces sought to undermine their influence in rural and tribal areas in the north and west. As part of their response to FRELIMO, the Portuguese government began to pay more attention to creating favourable conditions for social development, economic growth, and egalitarian policies.

=== Independence (1975) ===
FRELIMO took control of the territory after ten years of sporadic warfare, as well as Portugal's own return to democracy after the fall of the authoritarian Estado Novo regime in the Carnation Revolution of April 1974 and the failed coup of 25 November 1975. Within a year, most of the 250,000 Portuguese in Mozambique had left—some expelled by the government of the nearly independent territory, some left the country to avoid possible reprisals from the unstable government—and Mozambique became independent from Portugal on 25 June 1975. A law had been passed on the initiative of the relatively unknown Armando Guebuza of the FRELIMO party, ordering the Portuguese to leave the country in 24 hours with only 20 kilograms (44 pounds) of luggage. Unable to salvage any of their assets, most of them returned to Portugal penniless.

=== Mozambican Civil War (1977–1992) ===
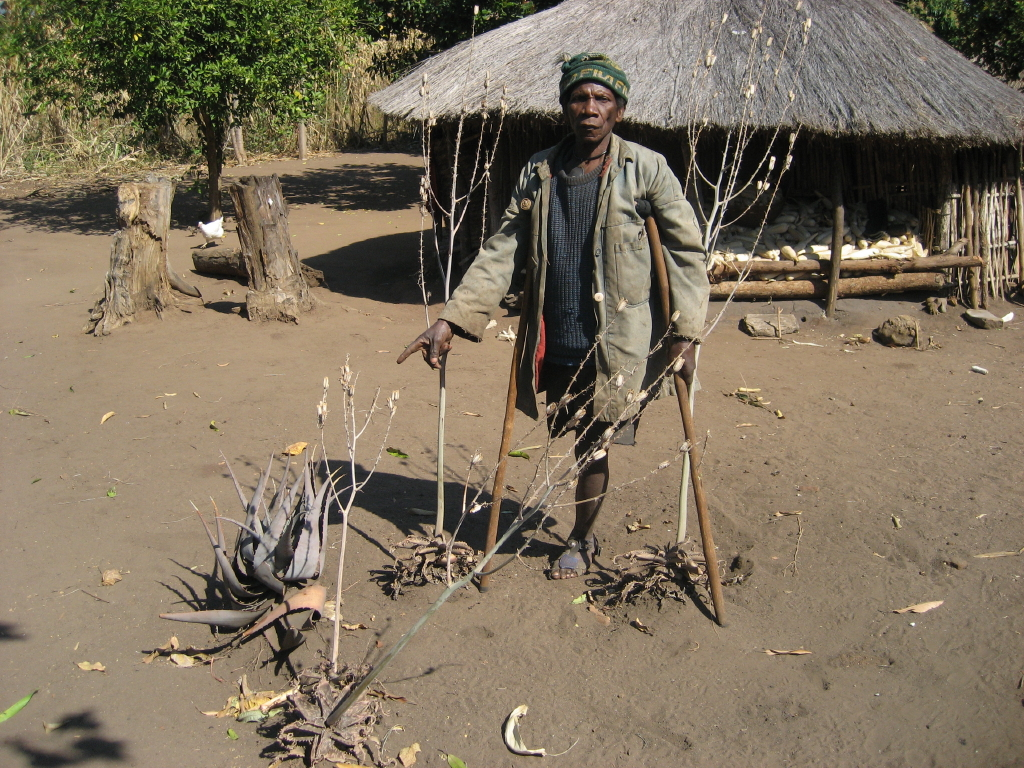
A land mine victim in Mozambique

The government under President Samora Machel established a one-party state based on Marxist principles. It received diplomatic and some military support from Cuba and the Soviet Union and proceeded to crack down on opposition. Shortly after independence, the country was plagued from 1977 to 1992 by a long and violent civil war between the opposition forces of anti-communist Mozambican National Resistance (RENAMO) rebel militias and the FRELIMO regime. This conflict characterised the first decades of Mozambican independence, combined with sabotage from the neighbouring states of Rhodesia and South Africa, ineffective policies, failed central planning, and the resulting economic collapse. This period was also marked by the exodus of Portuguese nationals and Mozambicans of Portuguese heritage, a collapsed infrastructure, lack of investment in productive assets, and government nationalisation of privately owned industries, as well as widespread famine.

During most of the civil war, the FRELIMO-formed central government was unable to exercise effective control outside urban areas, many of which were cut off from the capital. RENAMO-controlled areas included up to 50% of the rural areas in several provinces, and it is reported that health services of any kind were isolated from assistance for years in those areas. The problem worsened when the government cut back spending on health care. The war was marked by mass human rights violations from both sides of the conflict, with both RENAMO and FRELIMO contributing to the chaos through the use of terror and indiscriminate targeting of civilians. The central government executed tens of thousands of people while trying to extend its control throughout the country and sent many people to "re-education camps" where thousands died.

The geopolitical situation in 1975; nations friendly to the FRELIMO are shown in orange.

During the war, RENAMO proposed a peace agreement based on the secession of RENAMO-controlled northern and western territories as the independent Republic of Rombesia, but FRELIMO refused, insisting on the undivided sovereignty of the entire country. An estimated one million Mozambicans perished during the civil war, 1.7 million took refuge in neighbouring states, and several million more were internally displaced. The FRELIMO regime also gave shelter and support to South African (African National Congress) and Zimbabwean (Zimbabwe African National Union) rebel movements, while the governments of Rhodesia and later apartheid South Africa backed RENAMO in the civil war. Between 300,000 and 600,000 people died of famine during the war.

On 19 October 1986, Machel was on his way back from an international meeting in Zambia when his plane crashed in the Lebombo Mountains near Mbuzini in South Africa. President Machel and thirty-three others died, including ministers and officials of the Mozambique government. The Soviet delegation within the United Nations' Special Investigation Commission (the Margo Commission) issued a minority report contending that the Soviets' expertise and experience had been undermined by the South Africans. Representatives of the Soviet Union advanced the theory that the plane had been intentionally diverted by a false navigational beacon signal, using a technology provided by military intelligence operatives of the South African government.

Machel's successor Joaquim Chissano implemented sweeping changes in the country, starting reforms such as changing from Marxism to capitalism and began peace talks with RENAMO. The new constitution, enacted in 1990, provided for a multi-party political system, a market-based economy, and free elections. Mozambique abolished the people's republic as the country's official name. The civil war ended in October 1992 with the Rome General Peace Accords, first brokered by the Christian Council of Mozambique (Council of Protestant Churches) and then taken over by the Catholic social service association Community of Sant'Egidio. Peace returned to Mozambique, under the supervision of the peacekeeping force of the United Nations.

=== Democratic era (1993–present) ===
Mozambique has held elections since 1994 as part of the peace accords negotiated with RENAMO. While the first elections were accepted by most political parties as free and fair, growing evidence shows that all subsequent elections since 1999 have been fraudulent. Electoral rigging is done by the state apparatus. Political opponents are regularly assassinated and imprisoned.

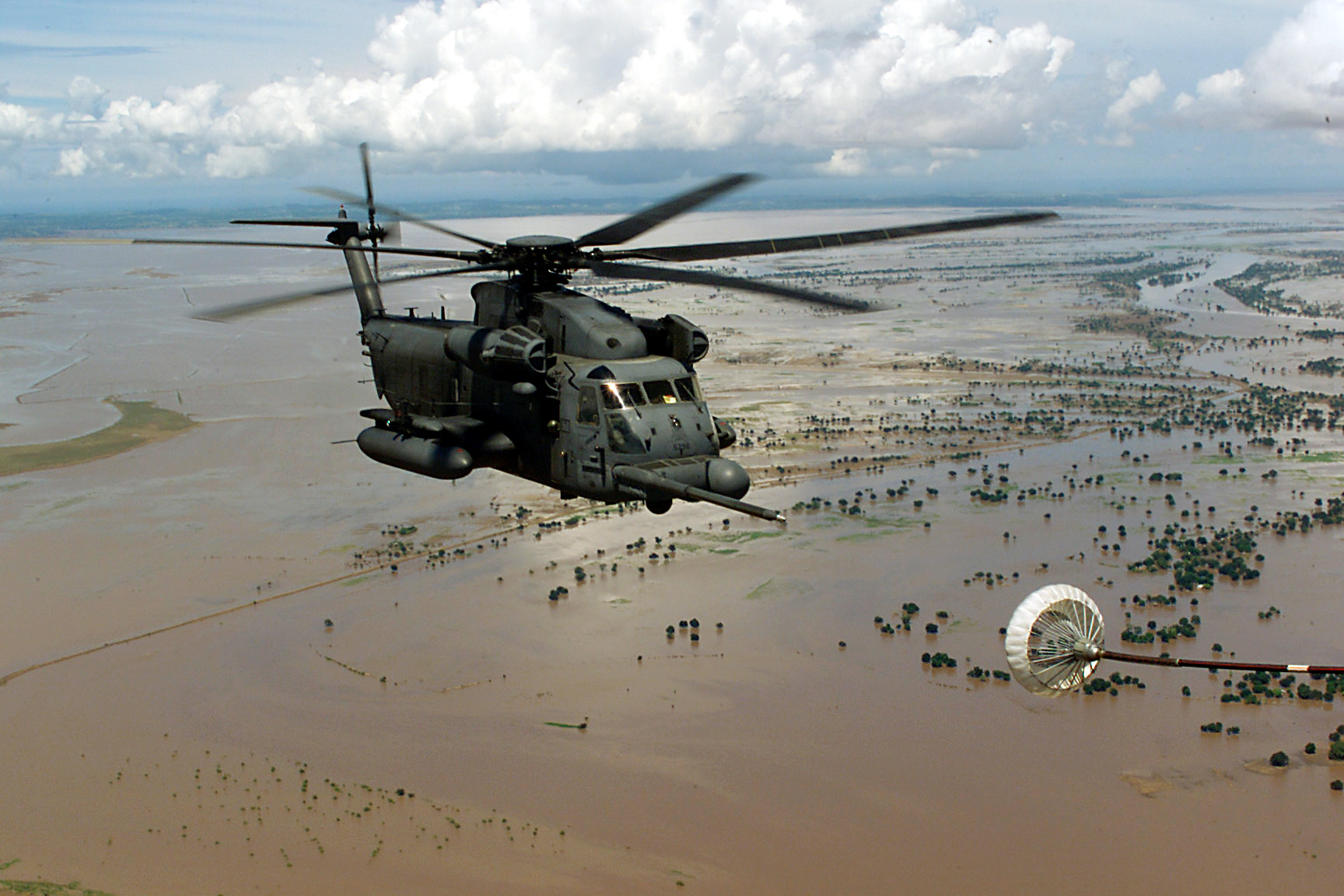
A US helicopter flying over the flooded Limpopo River during the 2000 Mozambique flood

In the 1994 elections, FRELIMO won, under Joaquim Chissano, while RENAMO, led by Afonso Dhlakama, ran as the official opposition. In 1995, Mozambique joined the Commonwealth of Nations, becoming, at the time, the only member nation that had never been part of the British Empire.

By mid-1995, over 1.7 million refugees who had sought asylum in neighbouring countries had returned to Mozambique, part of the largest repatriation witnessed in sub-Saharan Africa. An additional four million internally displaced persons had returned to their homes. In December 1999, Mozambique held elections for a second time since the civil war, which were again won by FRELIMO. RENAMO accused FRELIMO of fraud and threatened to return to civil war but backed down after taking the matter to the Supreme Court and losing.

In early 2000, a cyclone caused widespread flooding, killing hundreds and devastating the already precarious infrastructure. There were widespread suspicions that foreign aid resources had been diverted by the powerful leaders of FRELIMO. Carlos Cardoso, a journalist investigating these allegations, was murdered, and his death was never satisfactorily explained.

Indicating in 2001 that he would not run for a third term, Chissano criticised leaders who stayed on longer than he had, which was generally seen as a reference to Zambian President Frederick Chiluba and Zimbabwean President Robert Mugabe. Presidential and National Assembly elections took place on 1–2 December 2004. FRELIMO candidate Armando Guebuza won with 64% of the popular vote, and Dhlakama received 32% of the popular vote. FRELIMO won 160 seats in Parliament, with a coalition of RENAMO and several small parties winning the 90 remaining seats. Guebuza was inaugurated as president on 2 February 2005 and served two five-year terms. His successor, Filipe Nyusi, became the fourth president on 15 January 2015.

From 2013 to 2019, a low-intensity insurgency by RENAMO occurred, mainly in the country's central and northern regions. On 5 September 2014, Guebuza and Dhlakama signed the Accord on Cessation of Hostilities, which brought the military hostilities to a halt and allowed both parties to concentrate on the general elections to be held in October 2014. However, after the general elections, a new political crisis emerged. RENAMO did not recognise the validity of the election results and demanded the control of six provinces – Nampula, Niassa, Tete, Zambezia, Sofala, and Manica – where they claimed to have won a majority.

In this new violent conflict from 2013 to 2016, about 12,000 refugees fled to Malawi, while this time, according to the UNHCR, Doctors Without Borders, and Human Rights Watch, government forces were the chief aggressors, contrary to the state-owned media's blaming of the RENAMO rebels for it: government forces were reported to have torched villages and carried out summary executions and sexual abuses.

In October 2019, Nyusi was re-elected in a landslide victory in general election. FRELIMO won 184 seats, RENAMO got 60 seats and the MDM party received the remaining 6 seats in the National Assembly. The opposition did not accept the results because of allegations of fraud and irregularities. FRELIMO secured a two-thirds majority in parliament, which allowed FRELIMO to re-adjust the constitution without needing the agreement of the opposition.

Since 2017, the country has faced an ongoing insurgency by Islamist groups. In September 2020, Islamic State insurgents captured and briefly occupied Vamizi Island in the Indian Ocean. In March 2021, dozens of civilians were killed and 35,000 others were displaced after Islamist rebels seized the city of Palma. In December 2021, nearly 4,000 Mozambicans fled their villages after an intensification of jihadist attacks in Niassa.

On 15 January 2025, Daniel Chapo was sworn in as Mozambique's fifth president. He had won the election as the candidate of the ruling FRELIMO party, although the result was rejected by the opposition.

== Geography ==
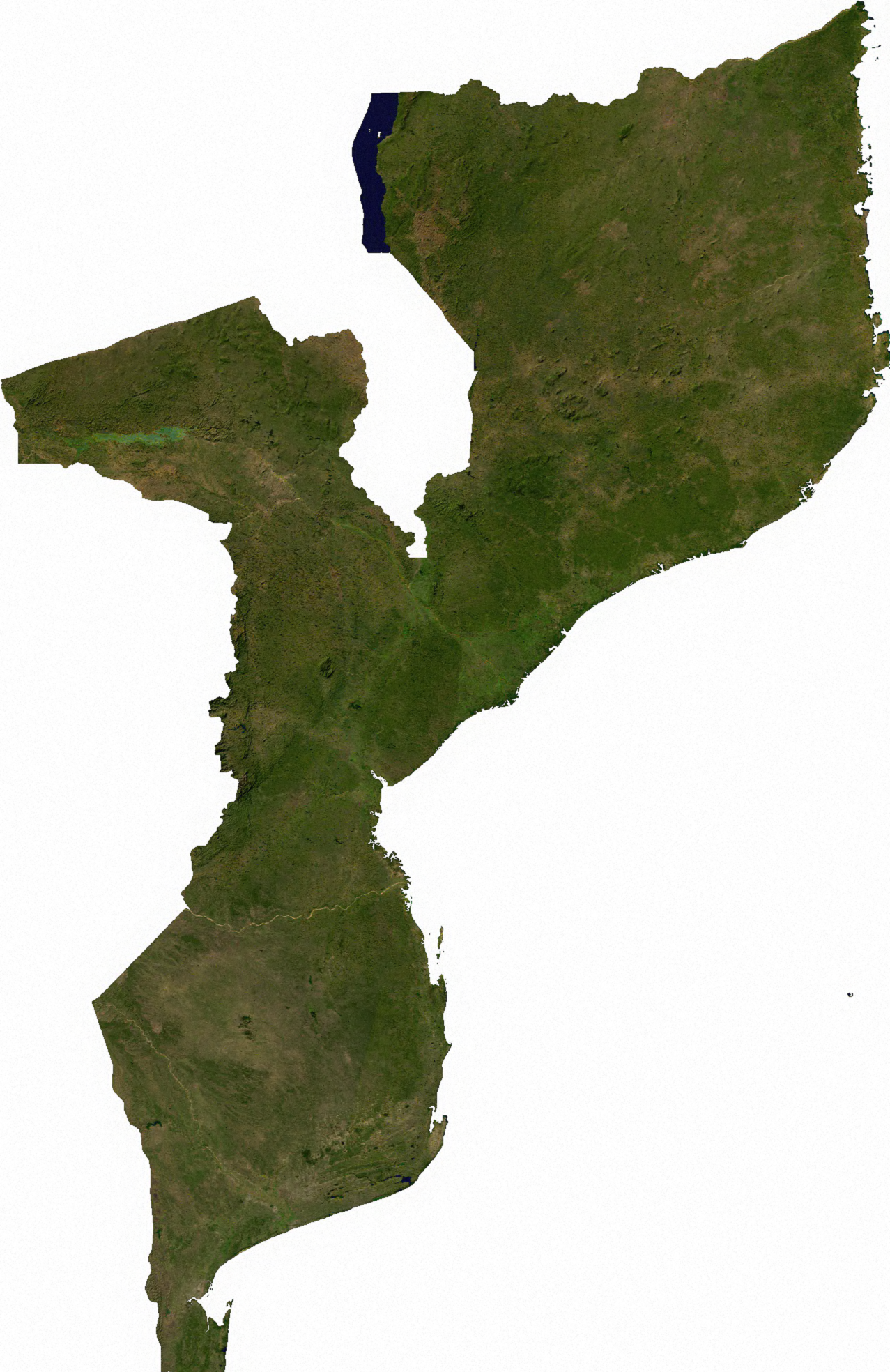
Satellite image

Traditional wooden fishing boat on the sandy shoreline of Bazaruto Island, Mozambique.

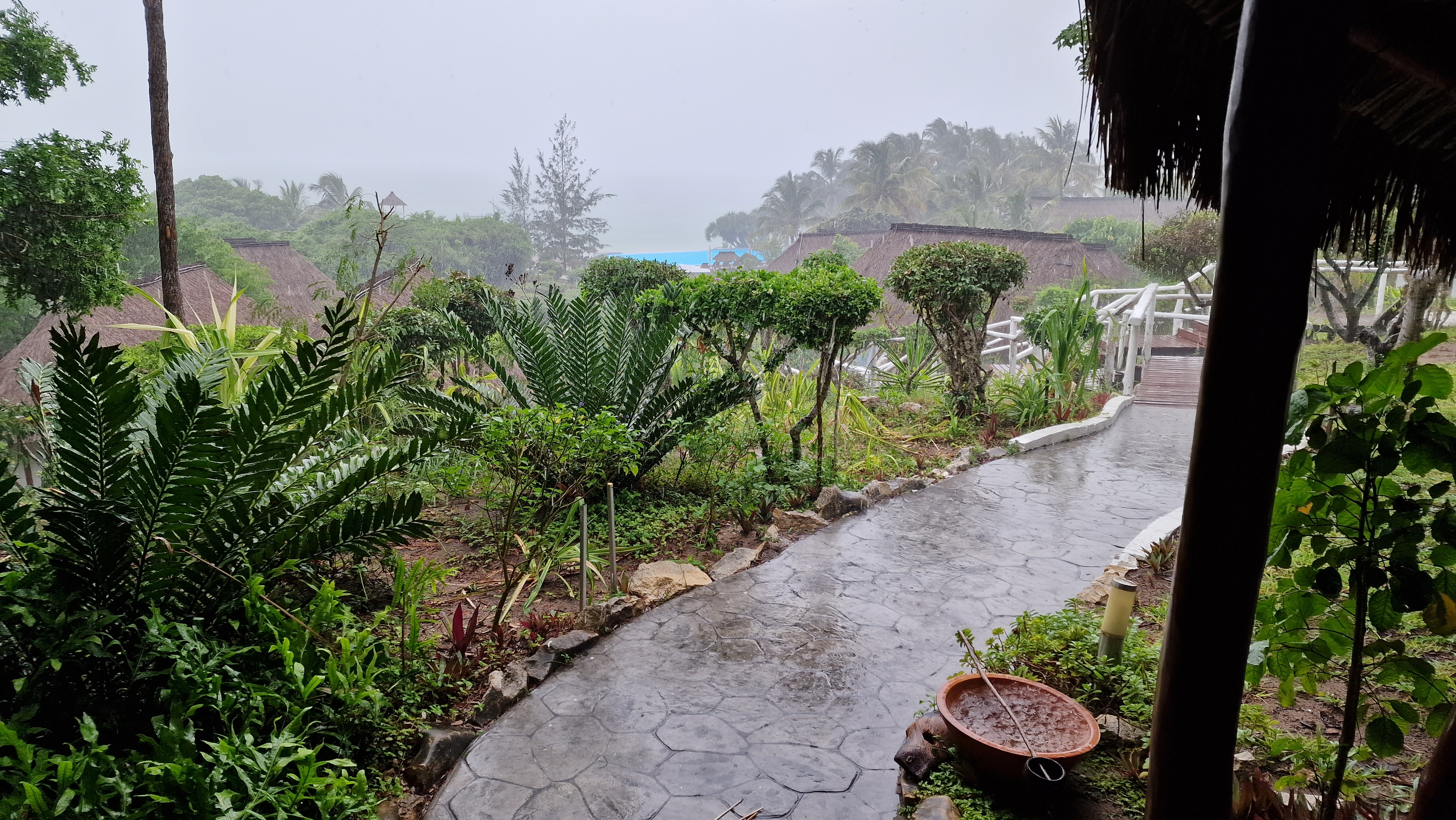
Rainstorm at a beach lodge in Mozambique

At 309,475 sq mi (801,537 km^{2}), Mozambique is the world's 35th-largest country. Mozambique is located on the southeast coast of Africa and is bound by Eswatini to the south, South Africa to the southwest, Zimbabwe to the west, Zambia and Malawi to the northwest, Tanzania to the north and the Indian Ocean to the east. Mozambique lies between latitudes 10° and 27°S, and longitudes 30° and 41°E.

The country is divided into two topographical regions by the Zambezi River. To the north of the Zambezi, the narrow coastal strip gives way to inland hills and low plateaus. Rugged highlands are further west; they include the Niassa highlands, Namuli or Shire highlands, Angonia highlands, Tete highlands and the Makonde plateau, covered with miombo woodlands. To the south of the Zambezi, the lowlands are broader with the Mashonaland plateau and Lebombo Mountains located in the deep south.

The country is drained by five principal rivers and several smaller ones, the Zambezi River being the largest and most important. The country has four notable lakes: Lake Niassa (or Malawi), Lake Chiuta, Cahora Bassa and Lake Shirwa, all in the north. The major cities are Maputo, Beira, Nampula, Tete, Quelimane, Chimoio, Pemba, Inhambane, Xai-Xai and Lichinga.

=== Climate ===
Mozambique map of Köppen climate classification zones

Mozambique has a tropical climate with two seasons: a wet season from October to March and a dry season from April to September. Climatic conditions, however, vary depending on altitude. Rainfall is heavy along the coast and decreases in the north and south. Annual precipitation varies from 500 to 900 mm (19.7 to 35.4 in) depending on the region, with an average of 590 mm (23.2 in). Cyclones are common during the wet season. Average temperature ranges in Maputo are from 13 to 24 °C (55.4 to 75.2 °F) in July and from 22 to 31 °C (71.6 to 87.8 °F) in February.

In 2019, Mozambique suffered floods and destruction from the devastating cyclones Idai and Kenneth, the first time two cyclones had struck the nation in a single season.

In February and March 2023, Tropical Cyclone Freddy hit Mozambique twice before dissipating. The resulting flooding caused significant infrastructure damage, with more than 22,000 houses affected, 60 health units flooded, and 1,265 km of roads damaged. Tens of thousands of hectares of crops were also affected during the flooding.

=== Wildlife ===
There are known to be 740 bird species in Mozambique, including 20 globally threatened species and two introduced species, and over 200 mammal species endemic to Mozambique, including the critically endangered Selous' zebra, Vincent's bush squirrel and 13 other endangered or vulnerable species.

Protected areas include thirteen forest reserves, seven national parks, six nature reserves, three frontier conservation areas and three wildlife or game reserves.

== Government and politics ==
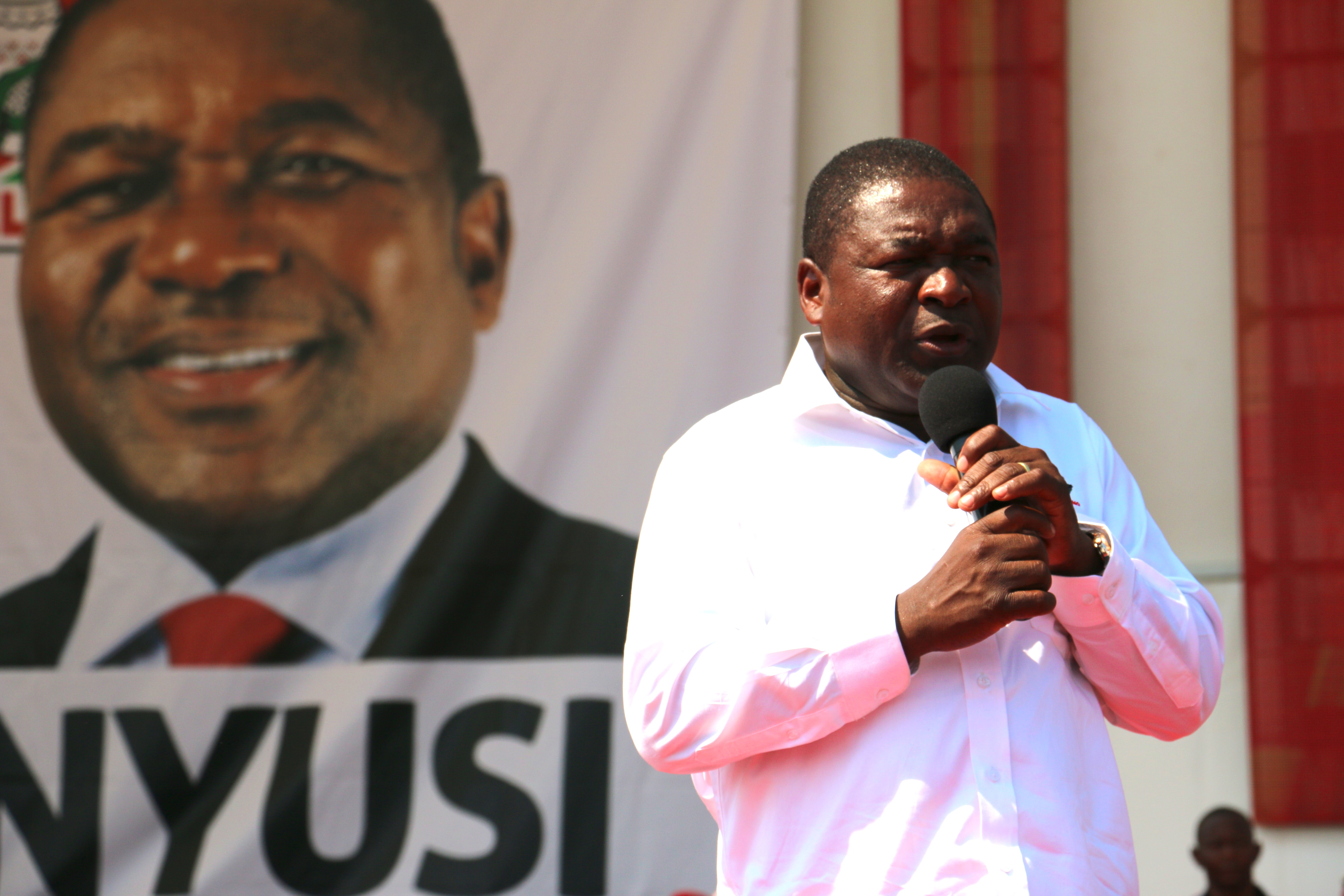
Former President Filipe Nyusi

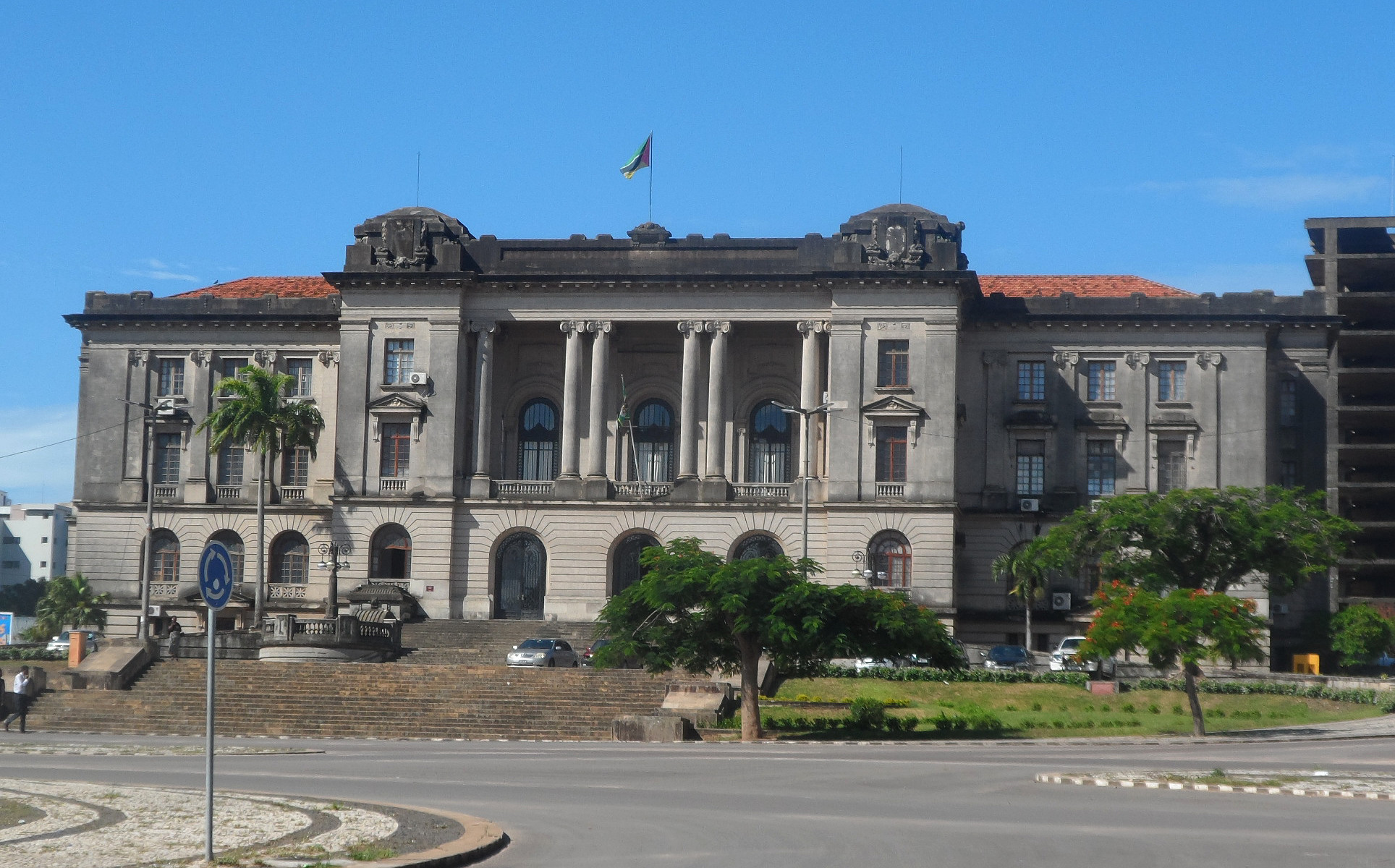
Maputo City Hall

The Constitution of Mozambique stipulates that the President of the Republic functions as the head of state, head of government, commander-in-chief of the armed forces, and as a symbol of national unity. They are directly elected for a five-year term via run-off voting. The prime minister is appointed by the president. Their functions include convening and chairing the council of ministers (cabinet), advising the president, assisting the president in governing the country, and coordinating the functions of the other ministers.

The Assembly of the Republic has 250 members, each elected for five-year terms by proportional representation. The judiciary comprises a Supreme Court and provincial, district, and municipal courts.

Mozambique operates a small, functioning military that handles all aspects of domestic national defence, the Mozambique Defence Armed Forces.

=== Administrative divisions ===
Mozambique is divided into ten provinces (provincias) and one capital city (cidade capital) with provincial status. The provinces are subdivided into 129 districts (distritos). The districts are further divided into 405 "postos administrativos" (administrative posts, headed by secretários) and then into localidades (localities), the lowest geographical level of the central state administration. There are 53 "municípios" (municipalities).

1. Niassa
2. Cabo Delgado
3. Nampula
4. Tete
5. Zambezia
6. Manica
7. Sofala
8. Gaza
9. Inhambane
10. Maputo (city)
11. Maputo

=== Foreign relations ===
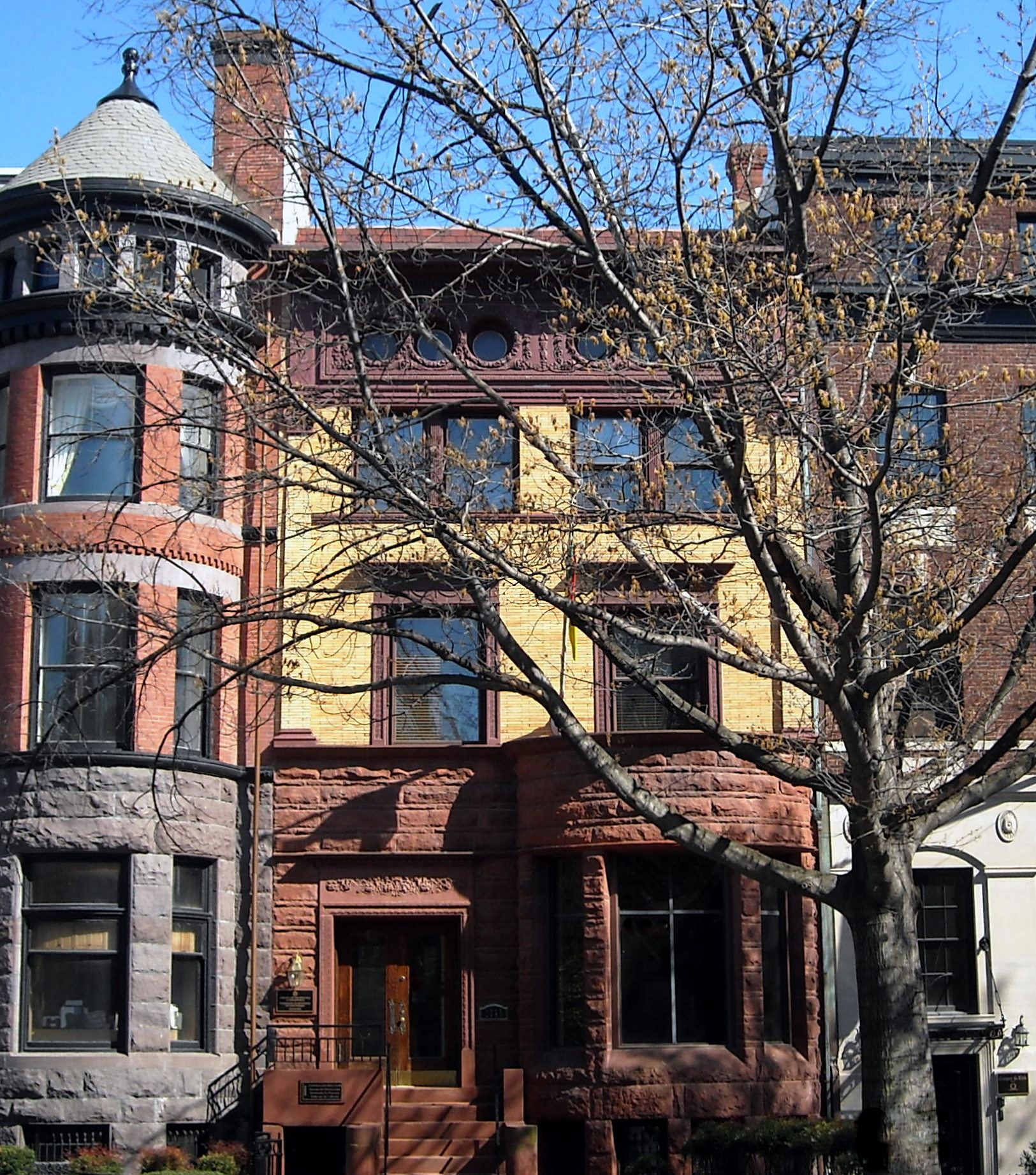
Mozambique's embassy in Washington, D.C.

While allegiances dating back to the liberation struggle remain relevant, Mozambique's foreign policy has become increasingly pragmatic. The twin pillars of Mozambique's foreign policy are maintenance of good relations with its neighbours and maintenance and expansion of ties to development partners.

During the 1970s and the early 1980s, Mozambique's foreign policy was inextricably linked to the struggles for majority rule in Rhodesia and South Africa as well as superpower competition and the Cold War. Mozambique's decision to enforce UN sanctions against Rhodesia and deny that country access to the sea led Ian Smith's government to undertake overt and covert actions to oppose the country. Although the change of government in Zimbabwe in 1980 removed this threat, the government of South Africa continued to destabilise Mozambique. Mozambique also belonged to the Frontline States. The 1984 Nkomati Accord, while failing in its goal of ending South African support to RENAMO, opened initial diplomatic contacts between the Mozambican and South African governments. This process gained momentum with South Africa's elimination of apartheid, which culminated in the establishment of full diplomatic relations in October 1993. While relations with neighbouring Zimbabwe, Malawi, Zambia and Tanzania show occasional strains, Mozambique's ties to these countries remain strong.

In the years immediately following its independence, Mozambique benefited from considerable assistance from European countries. The Soviet Union and its allies became Mozambique's primary economic, military and political supporters, and its foreign policy reflected this linkage. This began to change in 1983; in 1984, Mozambique joined the World Bank and International Monetary Fund. Western aid by the Scandinavian countries of Sweden, Norway, Denmark and Iceland quickly replaced Soviet support. Finland and the Netherlands are becoming increasingly important sources of development assistance. Italy also maintains a profile in Mozambique as a result of its key role during the peace process. Relations with Portugal, the former colonial power, continue to be important because Portuguese investors play a visible role in Mozambique's economy.

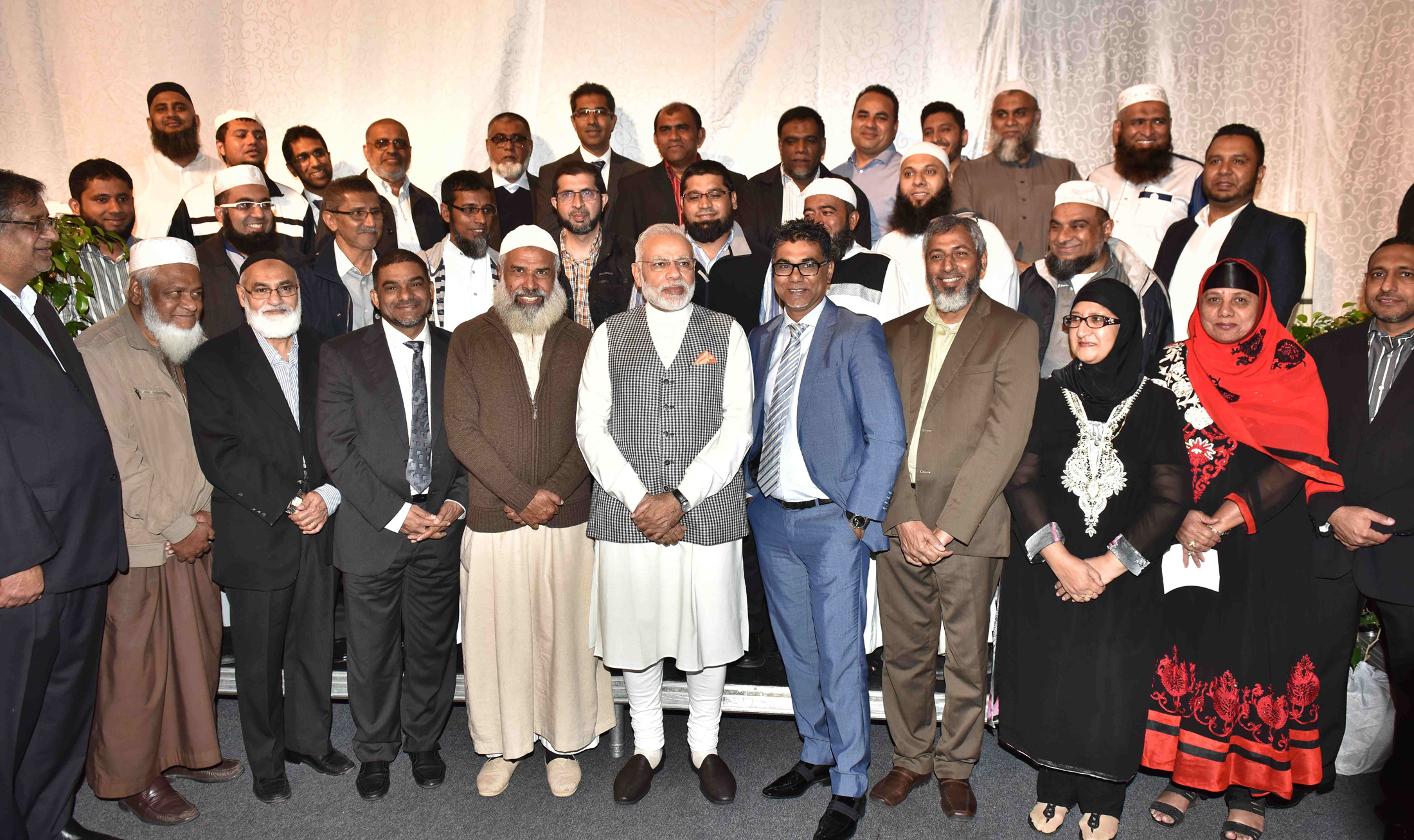
Indian Prime Minister Narendra Modi meets members of Indian community in Mozambique, 7 July 2016.

Mozambique is a member of the Non-Aligned Movement and ranks among the moderate members of the African bloc in the United Nations and other international organisations. Mozambique also belongs to the African Union and the Southern African Development Community. In 1994, the government became a full member of the Organisation of the Islamic Conference, in part to broaden its base of international support but also to please the country's sizeable Muslim population. Similarly, in 1995 Mozambique joined its Anglophone neighbours in the Commonwealth of Nations. At the time it was the only nation to have joined the Commonwealth that was never part of the British Empire. In the same year, Mozambique became a founding member and the first president of the Community of Portuguese Language Countries and maintains close ties with other Portuguese-speaking countries.

=== Military ===
The Mozambique Defence Armed Forces (FADM; Forças Armadas de Defesa de Moçambique) constitute the national military of the country. Established in August 1994 following the Rome General Peace Accords that ended the Mozambican Civil War, the FADM was formed by integrating the remaining forces of the government's Popular Forces for the Liberation of Mozambique (FPLM) with the insurgent troops of the Mozambican National Resistance (RENAMO) under the supervision of a United Nations peacekeeping mission. The military operates under a unified structure consisting of three primary branches: the Army (Exército), the Air Force (Força Aérea de Moçambique), and the Navy (Marinha de Guerra de Moçambique).

Historically underfunded and small relative to the country's size, Mozambique's domestic security apparatus struggled during the late 2010s to counter asymmetric threats internally. However, the outbreak of a violent insurgency in the northern province of Cabo Delgado beginning in October 2017 drastically shifted Mozambique's defense priorities. The insurgency, initially launched by the local Salafist group Ahlu Sunna Wal Jamaah and later formally aligned with transnational networks as the Islamic State – Mozambique Province (IS-M), targeted critical towns, civil infrastructure, and multi-billion dollar offshore liquefied natural gas projects on the Afungi peninsula.

To remedy institutional inefficiencies within the FADM, the Mozambican government progressively adapted its national security approach by pursuing external, multi-layered defensive frameworks. While initially deploying private military contractors, Mozambique formally accepted regional support through the Southern African Development Community Mission in Mozambique (SAMIM) and political endorsements from the African Union. Due to the slow, consensus-based, and financially constrained nature of regional multilateral deployments—with South Africa bearing a heavy financial burden—Mozambique increasingly shifted its strategic preference toward direct, flexible bilateral defense partnerships. This led to a major, ongoing bilateral military intervention by the Rwanda Defence Force starting in July 2021, which successfully secured key maritime infrastructure and counterinsurgency zones in the northern regions alongside Mozambican units.

=== Human rights ===
Same-sex sexual activity has been legal since 2015. However, discrimination against LGBT people in Mozambique is widespread.

== Economy ==
Historical development of real GDP per capita in Mozambique, since 1960

Mozambique is one of the poorest and most underdeveloped countries in the world, even though between 1994 and 2006 its average annual GDP growth was approximately 8%. Since 2014/15, household real consumption has decreased significantly, and a sharp rise in economic inequality has been observed. The IMF classifies Mozambique as a heavily indebted poor country. In a 2006 survey, three-quarters of Mozambicans said that in the past five years their economic position had remained the same or become worse.

The official currency is the metical (in October 2023, US$1 was roughly equivalent to 64 meticals). The U.S. dollar, South African rand, and the euro are widely accepted and used in business transactions. The minimum legal salary is around US$60 per month. Mozambique is a member of the Southern African Development Community (SADC). The SADC free trade protocol is aimed at making Southern Africa more competitive by eliminating tariffs and other trade barriers. The World Bank in 2007 talked of Mozambique's 'blistering pace of economic growth'. A joint donor-government study in early 2007 said 'Mozambique is generally considered an aid success story.'

=== Rebounding growth ===
The resettlement of civil war refugees and successful economic reform have led to a high growth rate: the country enjoyed a remarkable recovery, achieving an average annual rate of economic growth of 8% between 1996 and 2006 and between 6–7% from 2006 to 2011. Rapid expansion in the future hinges on several major foreign investment projects, continued economic reform, and the revival of the agriculture, transportation, and tourism sectors. In 2013, about 80% of the population was employed in agriculture, the majority of whom were engaged in small-scale subsistence farming, which still suffered from inadequate infrastructure, commercial networks, and investment. However, in 2012, more than 90% of arable land was still uncultivated.

In 2013, a BBC article reported that starting in 2009, there was increased Portuguese immigration due to the poor economic situation in Portugal.

=== Economic reforms ===
More than 1,200 mostly small state-owned enterprises have been privatised. Preparations for privatisation and/or sector liberalisation were made for the remaining parastatal enterprises, including telecommunications, energy, ports, and railways. The government frequently selected a strategic foreign investor when privatising a parastatal. Additionally, customs duties have been reduced, and customs management has been streamlined and reformed. The government introduced a value-added tax in 1999 as part of its efforts to increase domestic revenues.

=== Corruption ===
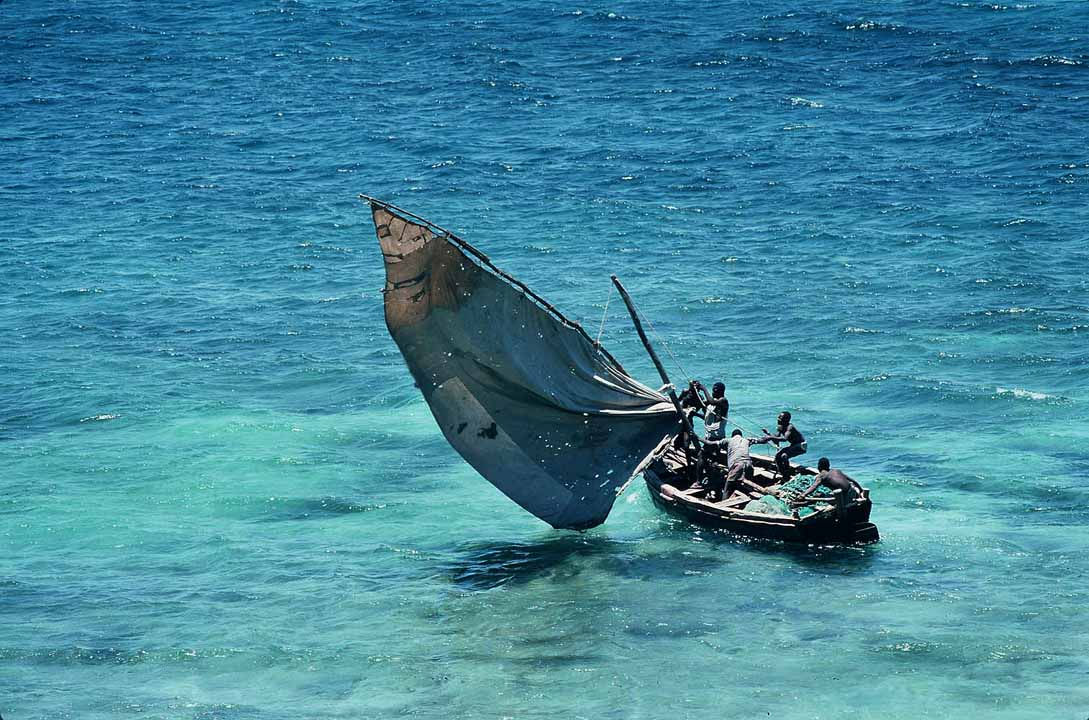
Traditional sailboat in Ilha de Moçambique

The economy has been shaken by numerous corruption scandals. In 2011 and 2012, the government proposed anti-corruption laws to criminalise embezzlement, influence peddling and graft, following numerous instances of the theft of public money. This has been endorsed by the country's Council of Ministers, and two former ministers were convicted for graft. Mozambique was ranked 116 of 178 countries in anti-graft watchdog Transparency International's index of global corruption. According to a USAID report written in 2005, "the scale and scope of corruption in Mozambique are cause for alarm."

In 2012, the government of Inhambane province uncovered the misappropriation of public funds by the director of the Provincial Anti-Drugs Office, Calisto Alberto Tomo. He was found to have colluded with the accountant in the Anti-Drugs Office, Recalda Guambe, to steal over 260,000 meticais between 2008 and 2010.

=== Natural resources ===
In 2010–2011, Anadarko Petroleum and Eni discovered the Mamba South gas field, with estimated reserves of 4,200 billion cubic metres (150 trillion cubic feet) of natural gas in the Rovuma basin, off the coast of northern Cabo Delgado Province. Once developed, this could make Mozambique one of the largest producers of liquefied natural gas in the world. GL Africa Energy (UK) plans to build and operate a 250 MW gas-powered plant, with production beginning in 2018. Mozambique is now scheduled to begin exporting LNG globally in 2024. In 2019, developments in the Rovuma Basin, referred to as The Mozambique LNG Project, raised $19 billion from a consortium of investors to finally bring this LNG to market. The majority of the project and its associated operations have been awarded to the company, TotalEnergies.

=== Tourism ===
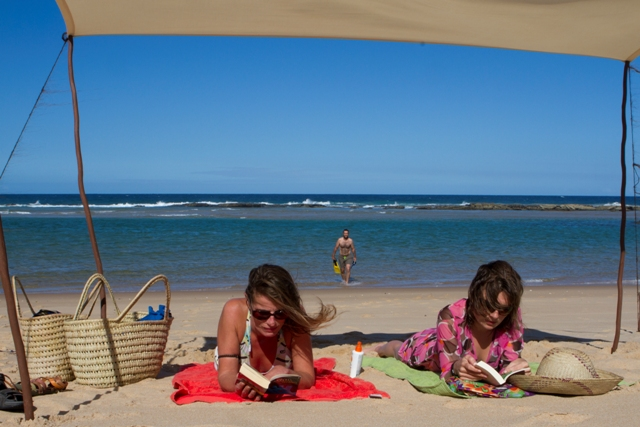
European tourists on the beach, in Inhambane, Mozambique

The natural environment, wildlife, and historic heritage provide opportunities for beach, cultural, and eco-tourism. Mozambique has a great potential for growth in its gross domestic product (GDP).

The north beaches with clean water are suitable for tourism, especially those that are very far from urban centres, such the Quirimbas Islands and the Bazaruto archipelago. The Inhambane Province attracts international divers because of the marine biodiversity and the presence of whale sharks and manta rays. There are several national parks, including Gorongosa National Park.

=== Transport ===
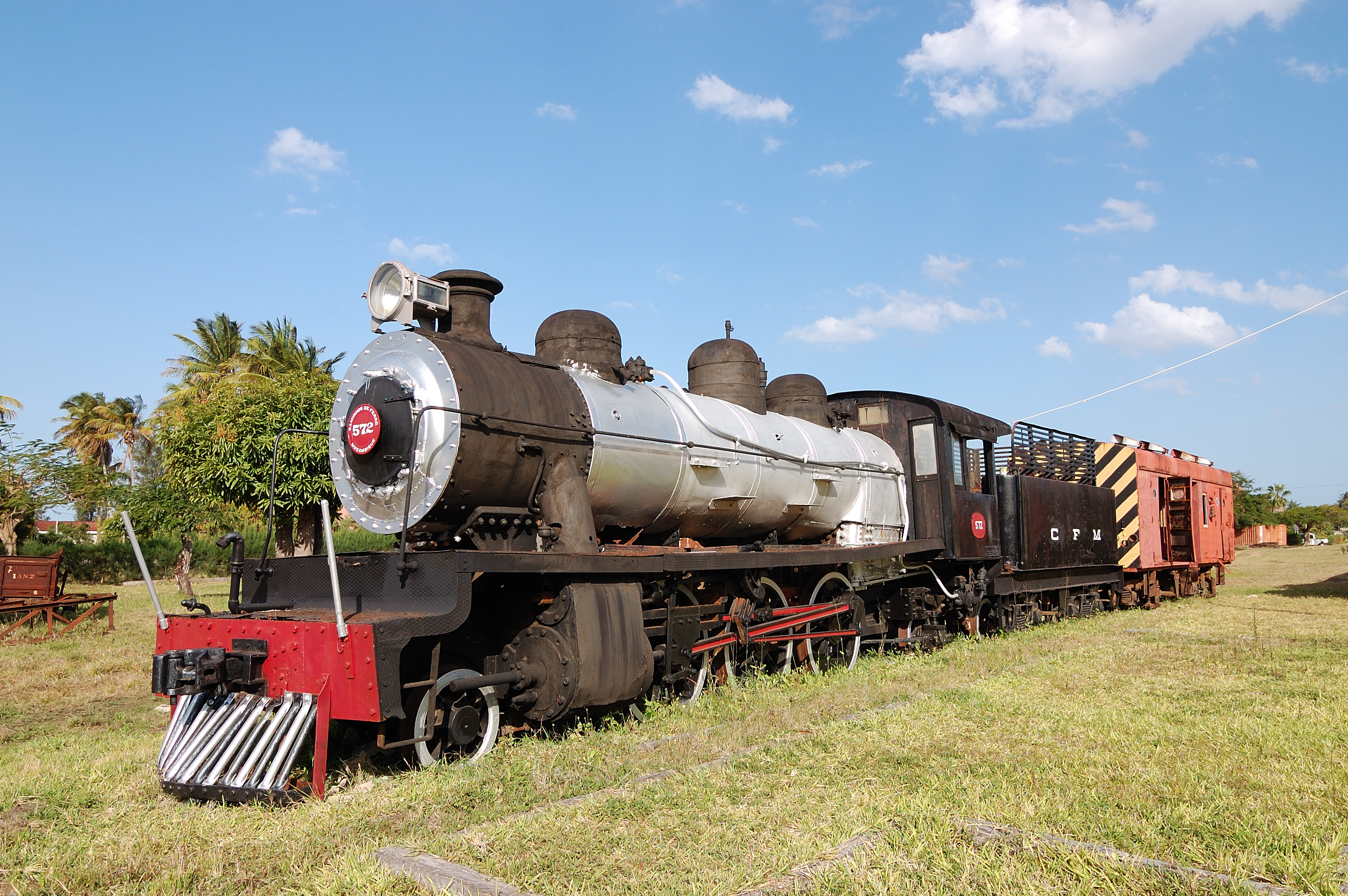
Steam locomotive (Porter 2-6-2 N° 572) at Inhambane, 2009

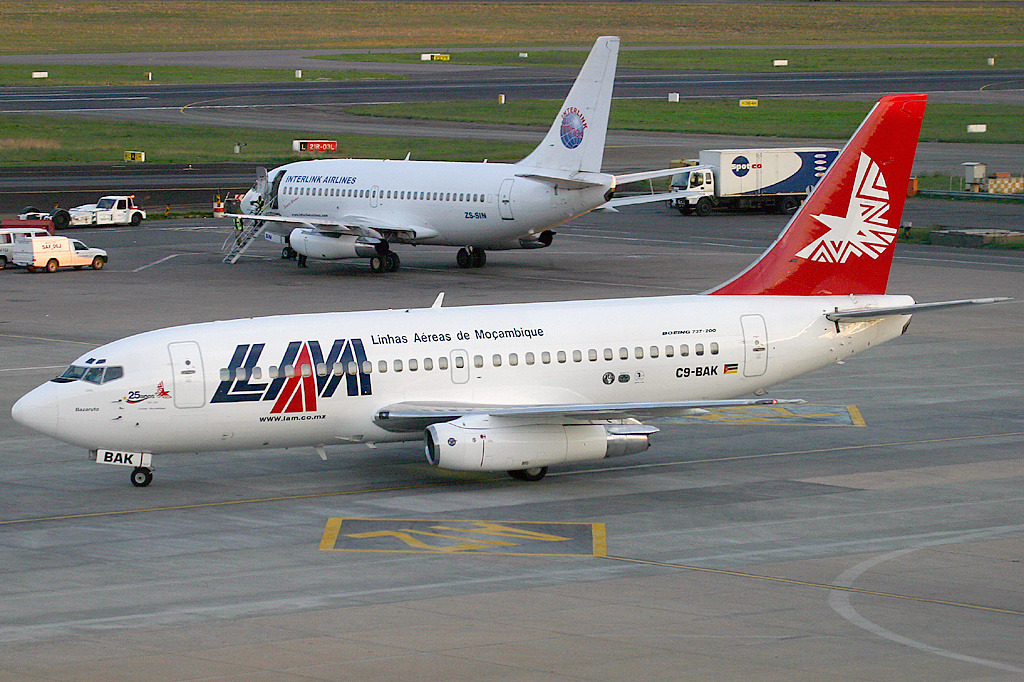
The national Mozambican airline, LAM Mozambique

There are over 30,000 km (19,000 mi) of roads, but much of the network is unpaved. Like its Commonwealth neighbours, traffic circulates on the left, in spite of not having been colonised by the British. There is an international airport at Maputo, 21 other paved airports, and over 100 airstrips with unpaved runways. There are 3,750 km of navigable inland waterways. There are rail links serving principal cities and connecting the country with Malawi, Zimbabwe and South Africa.

The railway system developed over more than a century from three different ports on the coast that served as terminals for separate lines to the hinterland. The railroads were major targets during the Mozambican Civil War, were sabotaged by RENAMO, and are being rehabilitated. A parastatal authority, Portos e Caminhos de Ferro de Moçambique (Mozambique Ports and Railways), oversees the railway system and its connected ports, but management has been largely outsourced. Each line has its own development corridor.

As of 2005 there were 3,123 km of railway track, consisting of 2,983 km of 1,067 mm (3 ft 6 in) gauge, compatible with neighbouring rail systems, and a 140 km line of 762 mm (2 ft 6 in) gauge, the Gaza Railway. The central Beira–Bulawayo railway and Sena railway route links the port of Beira to the landlocked countries of Malawi, Zambia and Zimbabwe. To the north of this the port of Nacala is also linked by Nacala rail to Malawi, and to the south the port of Maputo is connected by the Limpopo rail, the Goba rail and the Ressano Garcia rail to Zimbabwe, Eswatini and South Africa. These networks interconnect only via neighbouring countries. A new route for coal haulage between Tete and Beira was planned to come into service by 2010, and in August 2010, Mozambique and Botswana signed a memorandum of understanding to develop a 1,100 km railway through Zimbabwe, to carry coal from Serule in Botswana to a deepwater port at Techobanine Point. Newer rolling stock has been supplied by the Indian Golden Rock workshop using centre buffer couplers and air brakes.

=== Water supply and sanitation ===
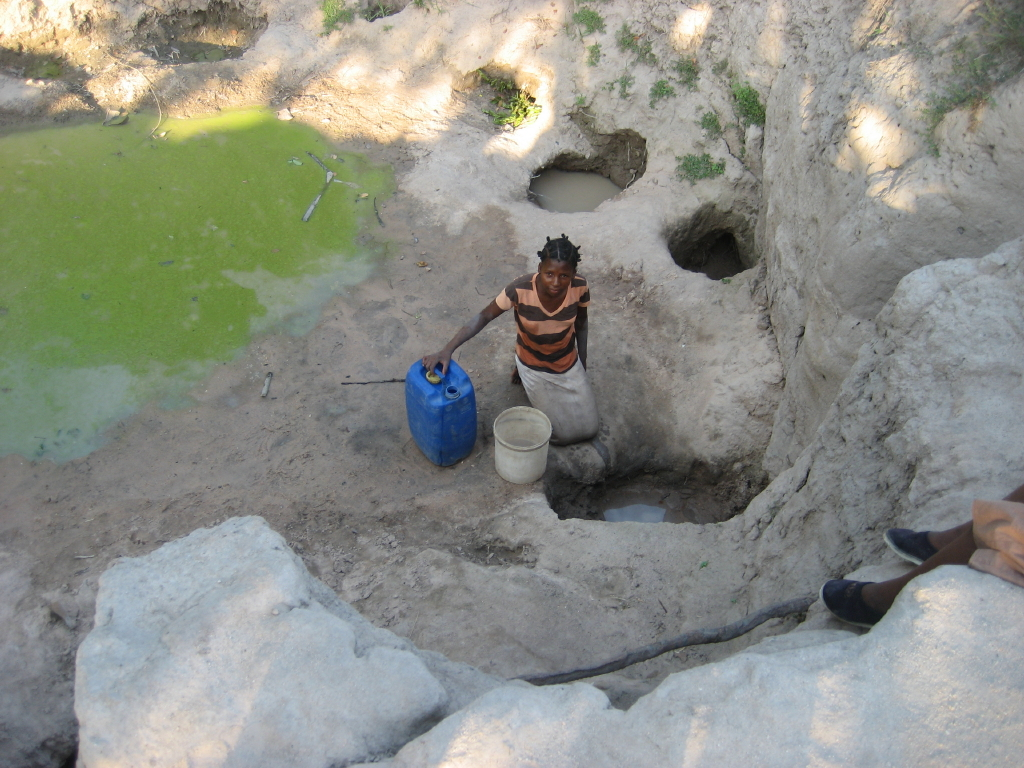
Woman fetching water during the dry season from a polluted source in Machaze District of the Central Manica Province

Water supply and sanitation in Mozambique is characterised by low levels of access to an improved water source (estimated to be 51% in 2011), low levels of access to adequate sanitation (estimated to be 25% in 2011) and mostly poor service quality. In 2007 the government defined a strategy for water supply and sanitation in rural areas, where 62% of the population lives. In urban areas, water is supplied by informal small-scale providers and by formal providers.

Beginning in 1998, the government reformed the formal part of the urban water supply sector through the creation of an independent regulatory agency called CRA, an asset-holding company called FIPAG and a public-private partnership (PPP) with a company called Aguas de Moçambique. The PPP covered those areas of the capital and of four other cities that had access to formal water supply systems. However, the PPP ended when the management contracts for four cities expired in 2008 and when the foreign partner of the company that serves the capital under a lease contract withdrew in 2010, claiming heavy losses. While urban water supply has received considerable policy attention, the government has no strategy for urban sanitation yet. External donors finance about 87.4% of all public investments in the sector.

== Demographics ==
The north-central provinces of Zambezia and Nampula are the most populous, with about 45% of the population. The estimated four million Makua are the dominant group in the north; the Sena and Shona (mostly Ndau and Manyika) are prominent in the Zambezi valley, and the Tsonga people dominate the south. Other groups include Makonde, Yao, Swahili, Tonga, Chopi, and Nguni (including Zulu). Bantu people comprise 97.8% of the population, with the rest made up of Portuguese ancestry, Euro-Africans (mestiço people of mixed Bantu and Portuguese ancestry), and Indians. Roughly 45,000 people of Indian descent reside in Mozambique.

During Portuguese colonial rule, a large minority of people of Portuguese descent lived permanently in almost all areas of the country, and Mozambicans with Portuguese heritage at the time of independence numbered about 360,000. Many of these left the country after independence from Portugal in 1975. There are various estimates for the size of Mozambique's Chinese community, ranging from 7,000 to 12,000 as of 2007.

According to a 2011 survey, the total fertility rate was 5.9 children per woman, with 6.6 in rural areas and 4.5 in urban areas.

=== Largest cities ===
Largest cities or towns in Mozambique According to the 2017 Census
Rank	Name	Province	Pop.	Rank	Name	Province	Pop.
1	Maputo	Maputo	1,080,277	11	Gurúè	Zambézia	210,000
2	Matola	Maputo	1,032,197	12	Pemba	Cabo Delgado	201,846
3	Nampula	Nampula	663,212	13	Xai-Xai	Gaza	132,884
4	Beira	Sofala	592,090	14	Maxixe	Inhambane	123,868
5	Chimoio	Manica	363,336	15	Angoche	Nampula	89,998
6	Tete	Tete	307,338	16	Inhambane	Inhambane	82,119
7	Quelimane	Zambézia	246,915	17	Cuamba	Niassa	79,013
8	Lichinga	Niassa	242,204	18	Montepuez	Cabo Delgado	76,139
9	Mocuba	Zambézia	240,000	19	Dondo	Sofala	70,817
10	Nacala	Nampula	225,034	20	Moçambique	Nampula	65,712

=== Languages ===
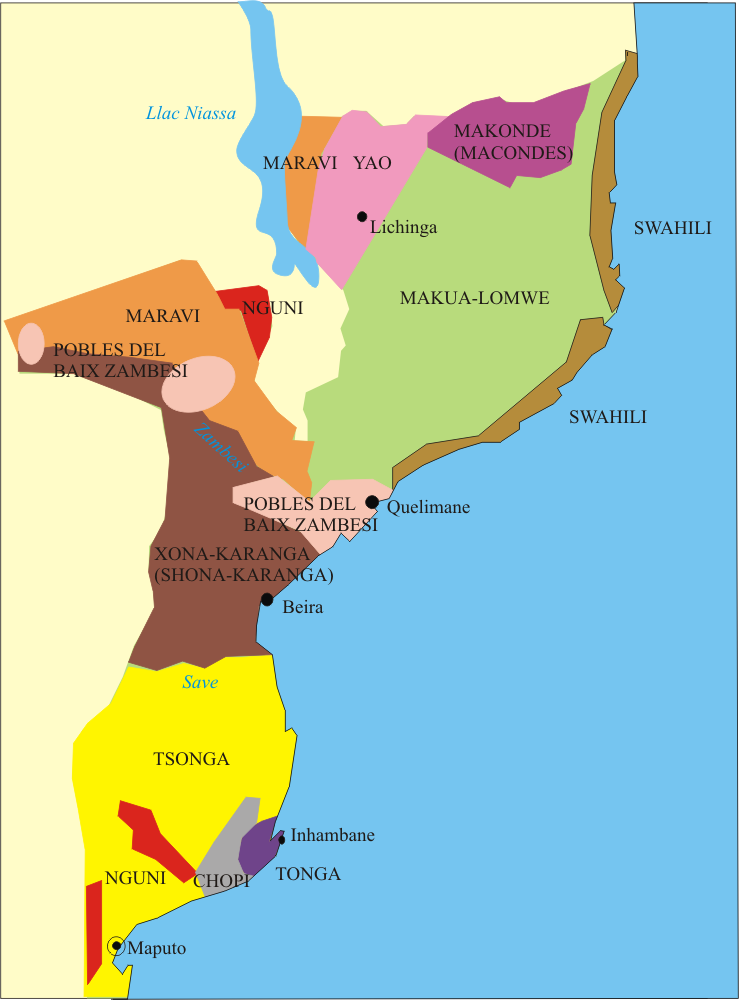
Ethnic map of Mozambique

Portuguese is the official and most widely spoken language, spoken by 50.3% of the population. Additionally, around 50% of Maputo speak Portuguese as a native language. The Bantu languages vary greatly in their groupings and in some cases are rather poorly appreciated and documented. Apart from its lingua franca uses in the north, Swahili is spoken in a small area of the coast next to the Tanzanian border; south of this, towards Moçambique Island, Kimwani, regarded as a dialect of Swahili, is used. Immediately inland of the Swahili area, Makonde is used, separated farther inland by a small strip of Makhuwa-speaking territory from an area where Yao or ChiYao is used. Makonde and Yao belong to a different group, Yao being very close to the Mwera language of the Rondo Plateau area in Tanzania. Prepositions appear in these languages as locative prefixes prefixed to the noun and declined according to their own noun-class. Some Nyanja is used at the coast of Lake Malawi, as well as on the other side of the Lake.

Somewhat different from all of these are the languages of the eMakhuwa group, with a loss of initial k-, which means that many nouns begin with a vowel: for example, epula = "rain". There is eMakhuwa proper, with the related eLomwe and eChuwabo, with a small eKoti-speaking area at the coast. In an area straddling the lower Zambezi, Sena, which belongs to the same group as Nyanja, is spoken, with areas speaking the related CiNyungwe and CiSenga further upriver.

A large Shona-speaking area extends between the Zimbabwe border and the sea: this was formerly known as the Ndau variety but now uses the orthography of the Standard Shona of Zimbabwe. Apparently similar to Shona, but lacking the tone patterns of the Shona language, and regarded by its speakers as quite separate, is CiBalke, also called Rue or Barwe, used in a small area near the Zimbabwe border. South of this area are languages of the Tsonga group. XiTswa or Tswa occurs at the coast and inland, XiTsonga or Tsonga straddles the area around the Limpopo River, including such local dialects as XiHlanganu, XiN'walungu, XiBila, XiHlengwe, and XiDzonga. This language area extends into neighbouring South Africa. Still related to these, but distinct, are GiTonga, BiTonga, and CiCopi or Chopi, spoken north of the mouth of the Limpopo, and XiRonga or Ronga, spoken in the immediate region around Maputo. The languages in this group are, judging by the short vocabularies, very vaguely similar to Zulu, but obviously not in the same immediate group. There are small Swazi- and Zulu-speaking area immediately next to the Swaziland and KwaZulu-Natal borders.

=== Religion ===
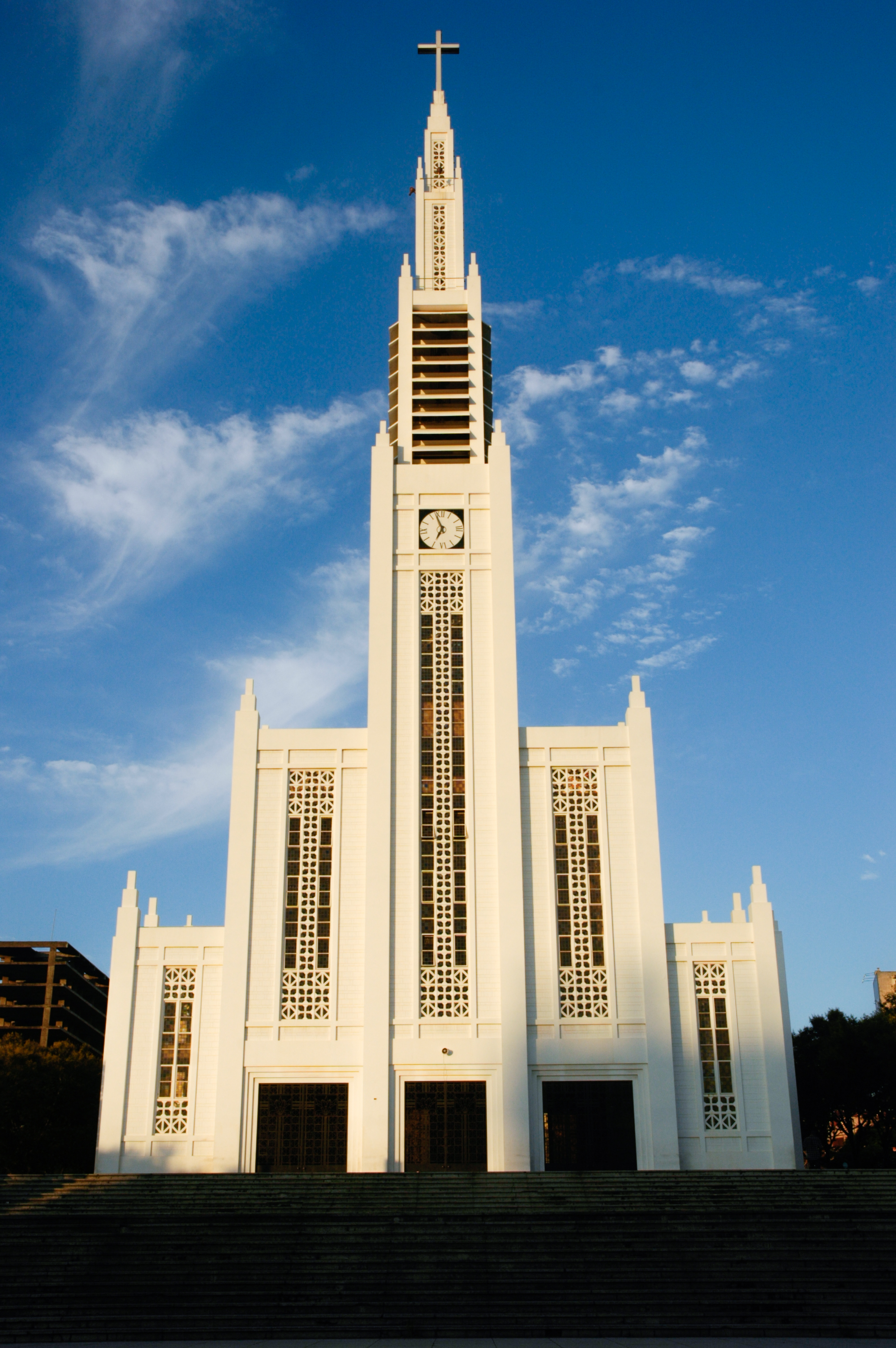
Cathedral of Our Lady of the Immaculate Conception, Maputo

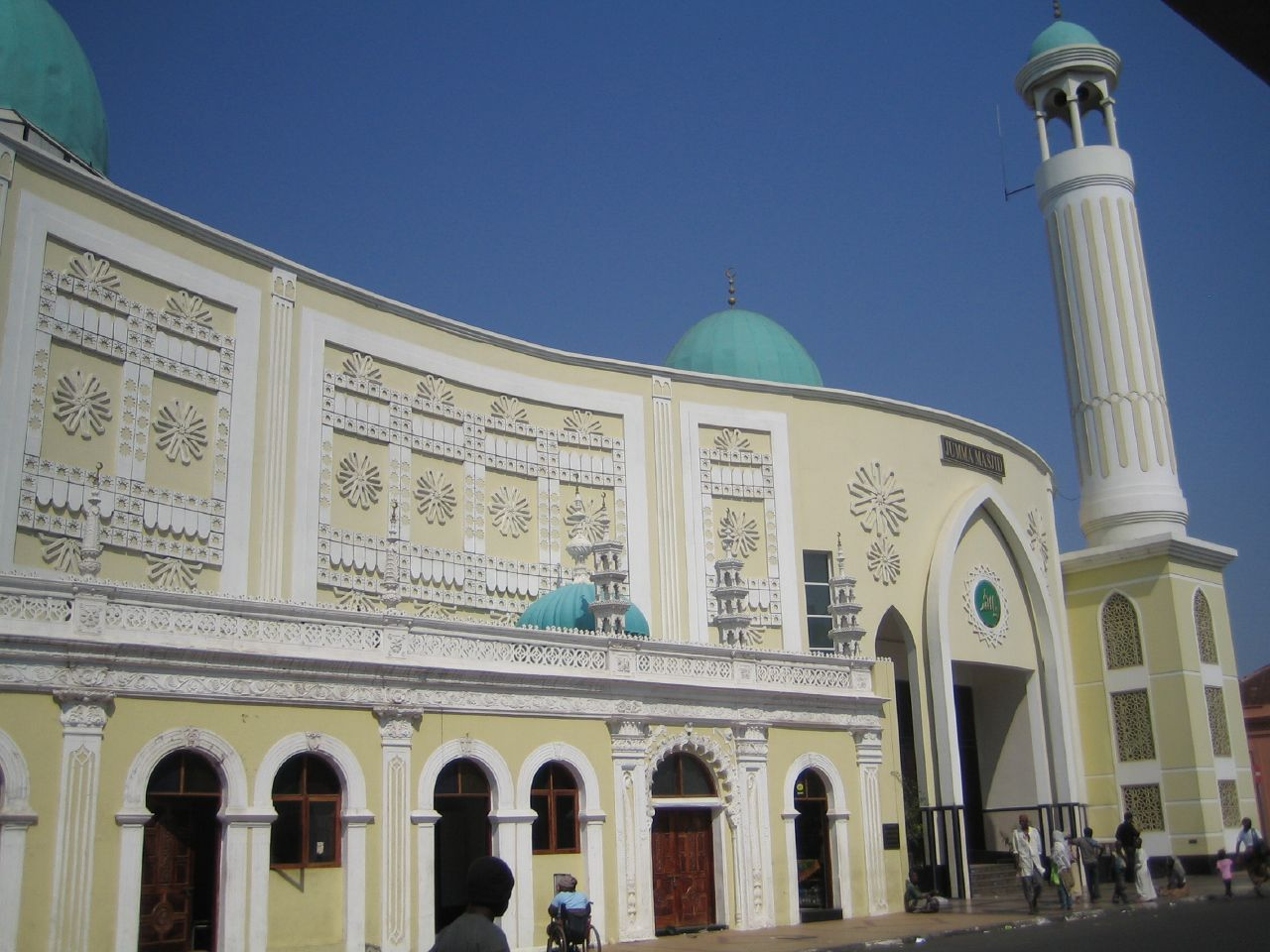
A mosque in downtown Maputo

The 2007 census found that Christians made up 59.2% of the population, Muslims comprised 18.9%, 7.3% held other beliefs (mainly animism), and 13.9% had no religious beliefs. A more recent government survey conducted by the Demographic and Health Surveys program in 2015 indicates that Catholicism comprised 30.5%, Protestants totaled 44%, and Muslims constituted 19.3%. According to 2018 estimates from the United States Commission on International Religious Freedom, 28% of the population is Catholic, 18% are Muslim (mostly Sunni), 15% are Zionist Christians, 12% are Protestants, 7% are members of other religious groups, and 18% have no religion.

The Catholic Church has established twelve dioceses (Beira, Chimoio, Gurué, Inhambane, Lichinga, Maputo, Nacala, Nampula, Pemba, Quelimane, Tete, and Xai-Xai; archdioceses are Beira, Maputo and Nampula). Statistics for the dioceses range from a low 5.8% Catholics in the population in the Diocese of Chimoio, to 32.50% in Quelimane diocese (Anuario catolico de Mocambique). Among the main Protestant denominations are Igreja União Baptista de Moçambique, the Assembleias de Deus, the Seventh-day Adventists, the Anglican Church of Southern Africa, the Igreja do Evangelho Completo de Deus, the Igreja Metodista Unida, the Igreja Presbiteriana de Moçambique, the Igrejas de Cristo and the Assembleia Evangélica de Deus. The work of Methodism started in 1890. Erwin Richards began a Methodist mission at Chicuque in Inhambane Province. The Igreja Metodista Unida em Moçambique (United Methodist Church in Mozambique) observed the 100th anniversary of Methodist presence 1990. President Chissano praised the work and role of the UMC to more than 10,000 people who attended the ceremony. The United Methodist Church has tripled in size since 1998. There are more than 150,000 members in more than 180 congregations of the 24 districts. New pastors are ordained each year. New churches are chartered each year in each Annual Conference (north and south).

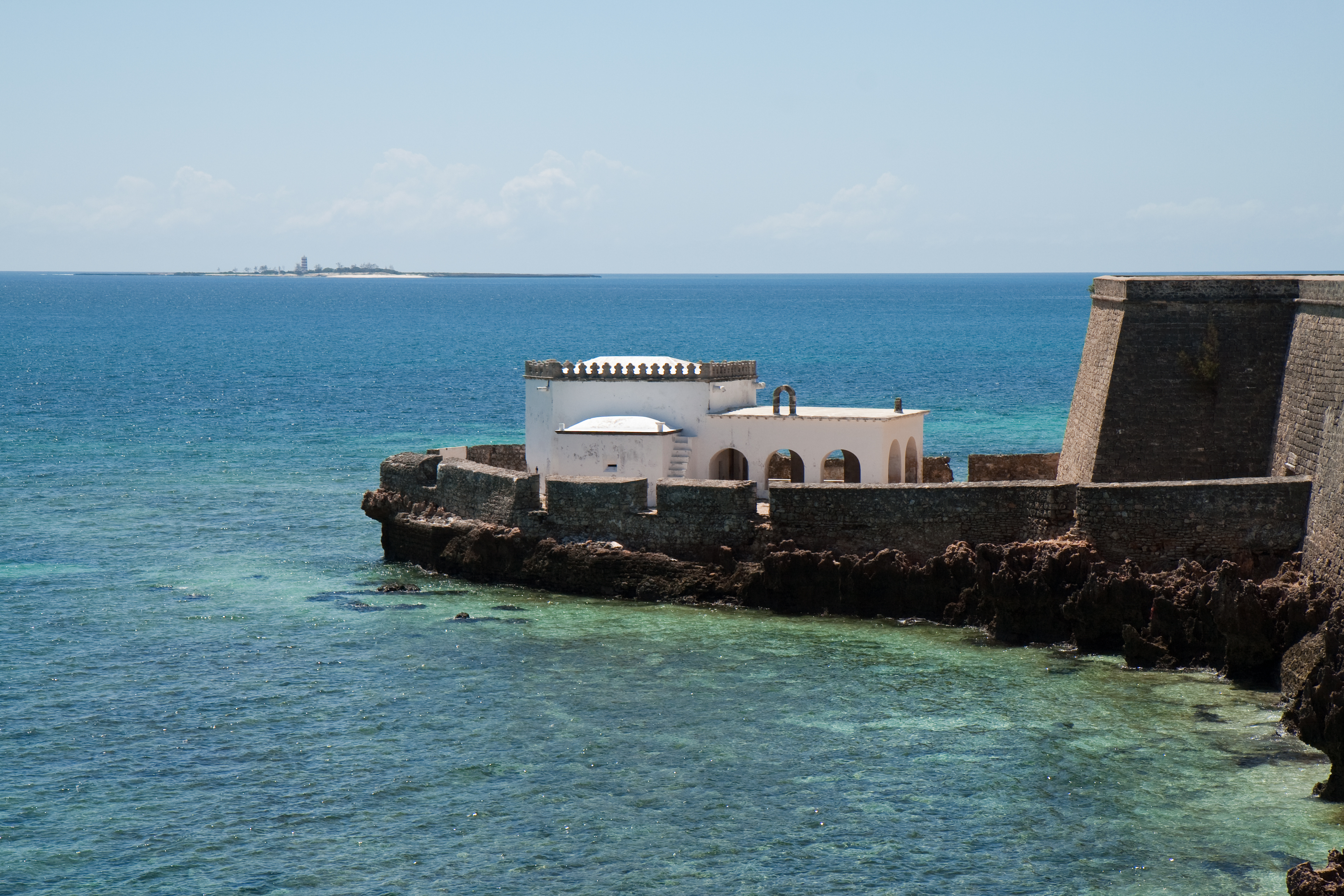
Chapel of Nossa Senhora de Baluarte

The Church of Jesus Christ of Latter-day Saints has established a growing presence. It first began sending missionaries in 1999, and, as of April 2015, has more than 7,943 members. The Baháʼí Faith has been present since the early 1950s but did not openly identify itself in those years because of the strong influence of the Catholic Church which did not recognise it officially as a world religion. The independence in 1975 saw the entrance of new pioneers. In total, there are about 3,000 declared Baháʼís as of 2010. Muslims are particularly present in the north. They are organised in several "tariqa" or brotherhoods. Two national organisations also exist—the Conselho Islâmico de Moçambique and the Congresso Islâmico de Moçambique. There are also important Pakistani, Indian associations as well as some Shia communities. There is a small Jewish community in Maputo.

=== Health ===
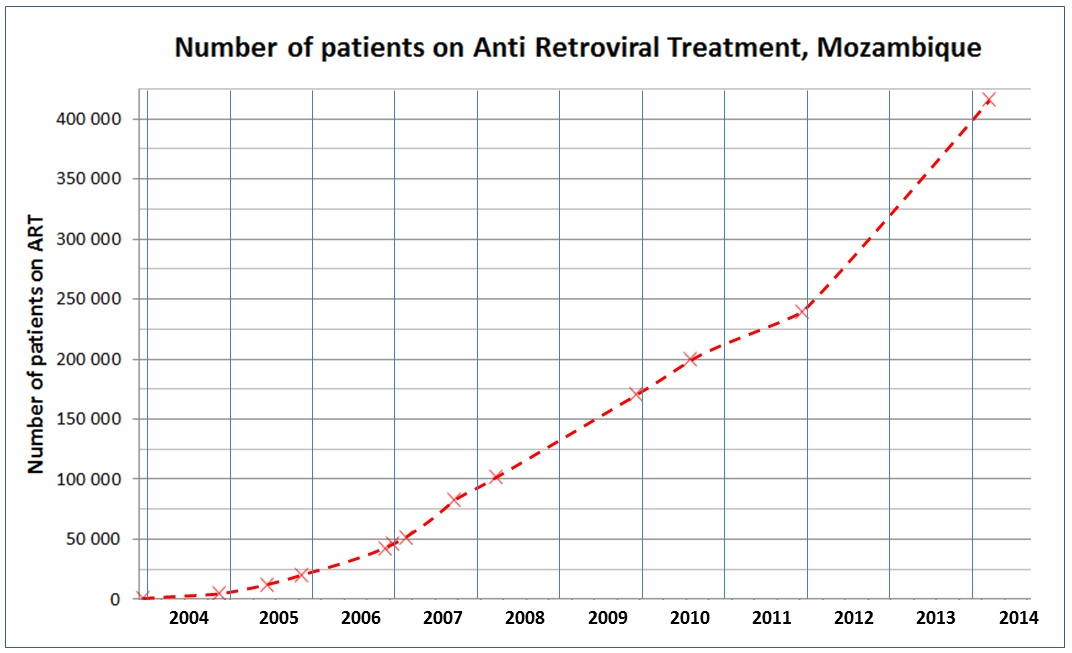
The increase in the number of HIV positive Mozambicans on Antiretroviral treatment, 2003–14

The fertility rate is at about 5.5 births per woman. Public expenditure on health was at 2.7% of the GDP in 2004, whereas private expenditure on health was at 1.3% in the same year. Health expenditure per capita was 42 US$ (PPP) in 2004. In the early 21st century there were 3 physicians per 100,000 people in the country. Infant mortality was at 100 per 1,000 births in 2005. The 2010 maternal mortality rate per 100,000 births is 550. This is compared with 598.8 in 2008 and 385 in 1990. The under 5 mortality rate, per 1,000 births is 147 and the neonatal mortality as a percentage of under 5s mortality is 29. The number of midwives per 1,000 live births is 3 and the lifetime risk of death for pregnant women 1 in 37.

The official HIV prevalence in 2011 was 11.5% of the population aged between 15 and 49 years. In the south—Maputo and Gaza provinces—the official figures are more than twice as high as the national average. In 2011, the health authorities estimated about 1.7 million Mozambicans were HIV-positive, of whom 600,000 were in need of anti-retroviral treatment. As of December 2011, 240,000 were receiving such treatment, increasing to 416,000 in March 2014, according to the health authorities.

Mozambique has been experiencing high levels of acute food insecurity for years.

=== Education ===
Portuguese is the primary language of instruction in all schools. All are required by law to attend school through the primary level; however, a lot of children do not go to primary school because they have to work for their families' subsistence farms for a living. In 2007, one million children still did not go to school, most of them from poor rural families, and almost half of all teachers were unqualified. Girls enrollment increased from 3 million in 2002 to 4.1 million in 2006 while the completion rate increased from 31,000 to 90,000, which testified a very poor completion rate.

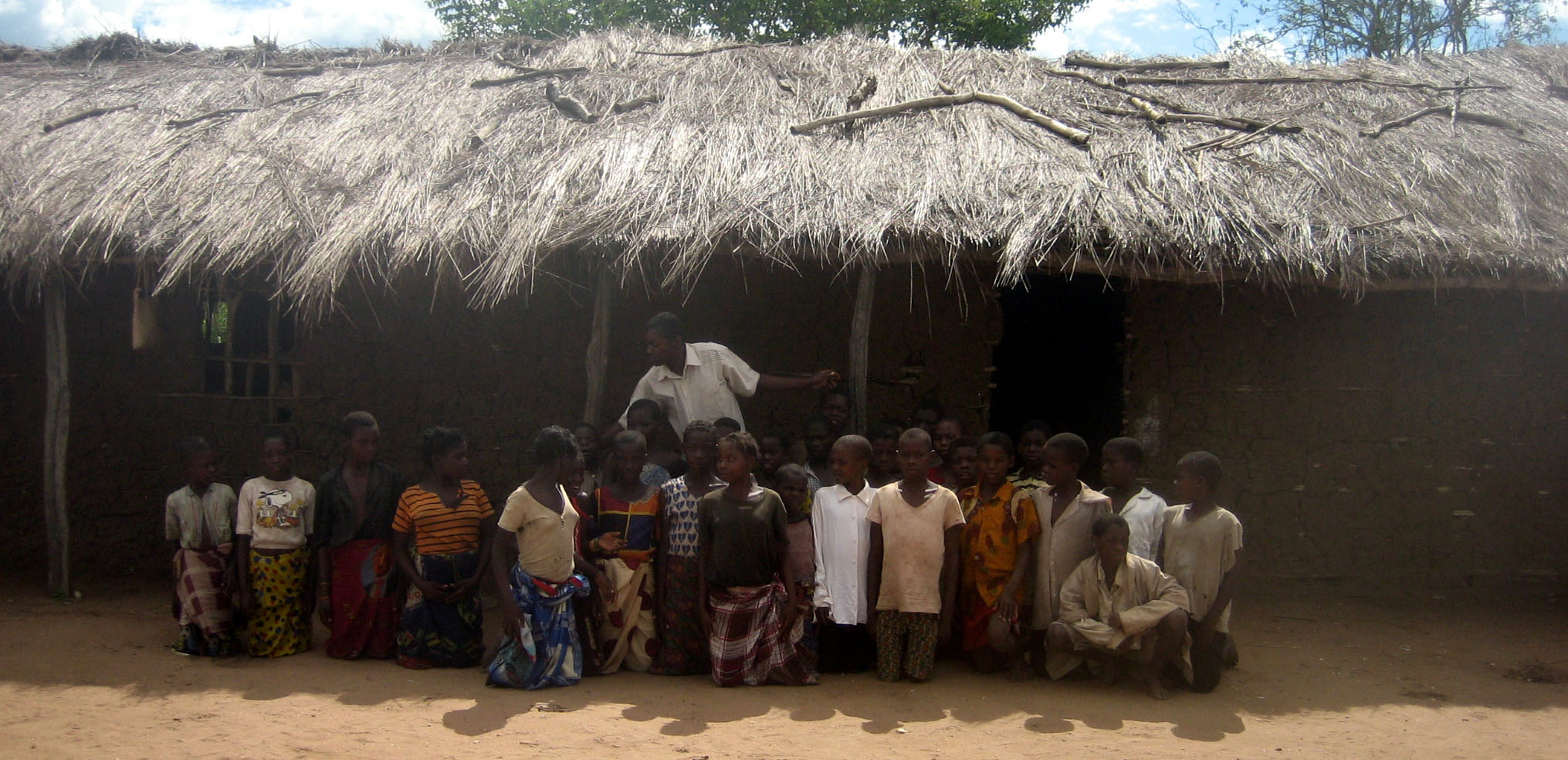
Students in front of their school in Nampula, Mozambique

After grade 7, pupils must take standardised national exams to enter secondary school, which runs from eighth to 10th grade. Space in universities is extremely limited; thus, most pupils who complete pre-university school do not immediately proceed on to university studies. Many go to work as teachers or are unemployed. There are also institutes that give more vocational training, specialising in agricultural, technical or pedagogical studies, which students may attend after grade 10 in lieu of a pre-university school. After independence from Portugal in 1975, many continued to be admitted every year at Portuguese high schools, polytechnical institutes and universities, through bilateral agreements between the Portuguese government and the Mozambican government.

According to 2010 estimates, the literacy rate was 56.1% (70.8% male and 42.8% female). By 2015, this had increased to 58.8% (73.3% male and 45.4% female).

== Culture ==
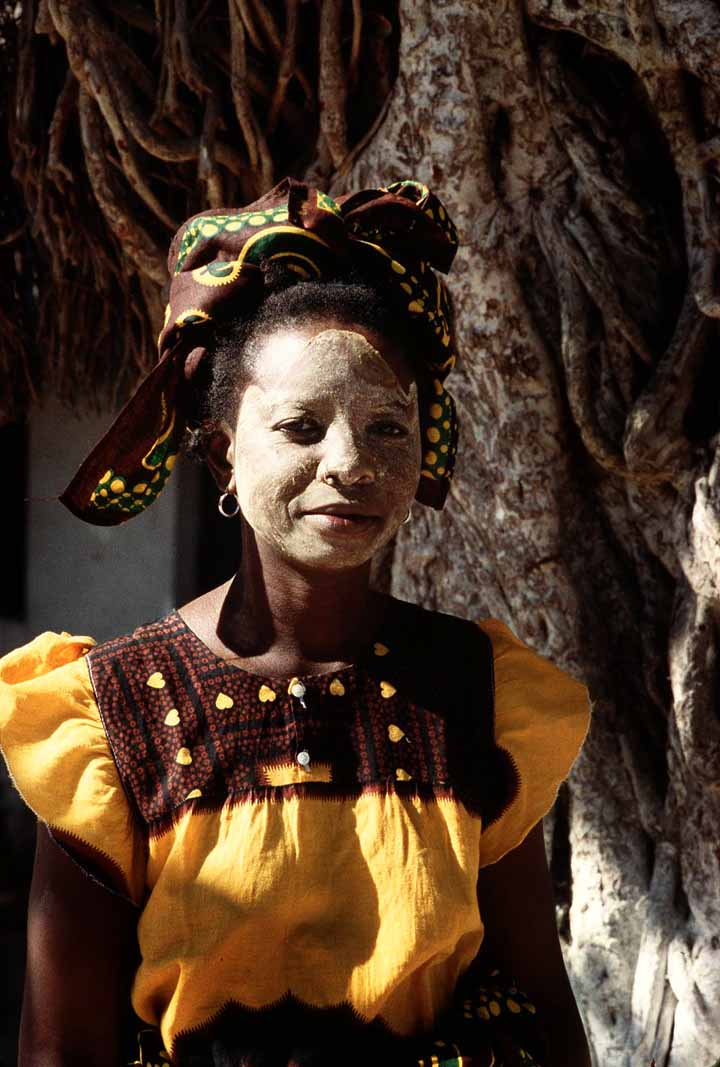
Woman with traditional mask in Mozambique

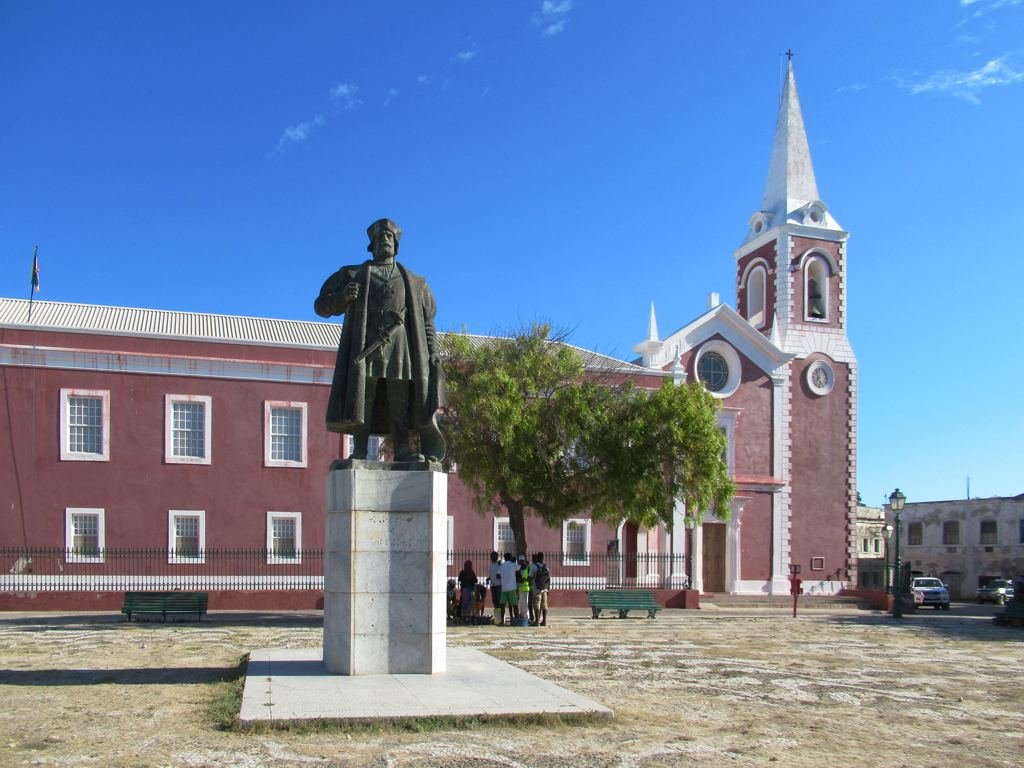
Island of Mozambique, 2016

Since most of the people are Bantus, most of the culture is native; for Bantus living in urban areas, there is some Portuguese influence. Mozambican culture also influences the Portuguese culture.

=== Arts ===
The Makonde are known for their wood carving and elaborate masks, which are commonly used in traditional dances. There are two different kinds of wood carvings: shetani, (evil spirits), which are mostly carved in heavy ebony, tall, and elegantly curved with symbols and nonrepresentational faces; and ujamaa, which are totem-type carvings which illustrate lifelike faces of people and various figures. These sculptures are usually referred to as "family trees" because they tell stories of many generations.

During the last years of the colonial period, Mozambican art reflected the oppression by the colonial power and became a symbol of resistance. After independence in 1975, modern art came into a new phase. The two best known and most influential contemporary artists are painter Malangatana Ngwenya and sculptor Alberto Chissano. A lot of the post-independence art during the 1980s and 1990s reflects the political struggle, civil war, suffering, and starvation.

Dances are usually intricate, highly developed traditions throughout Mozambique. There are many different kinds of dances from tribe to tribe, which are usually ritualistic in nature. The Chopi, for instance, act out battles dressed in animal skins. The men of Makua dress in colourful outfits and masks while dancing on stilts around the village for hours. Groups of women in the northern part of the country perform a traditional dance called tufo, to celebrate Islamic holidays.

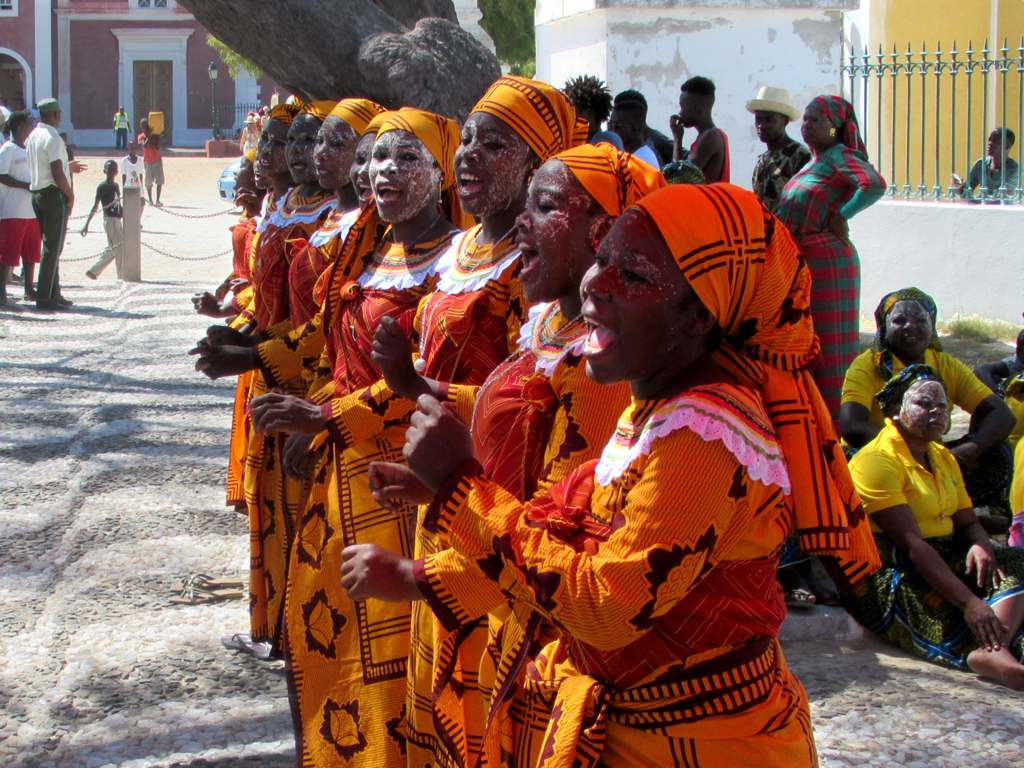
Dancers on Mozambique Island

=== Music ===
The music of Mozambique serves many purposes, ranging from religious expression to traditional ceremonies. Musical instruments are usually handmade. Some of the instruments include drums made of wood and animal skin; the lupembe, a woodwind instrument made from animal horns or wood; and the marimba, which is a kind of xylophone native to Mozambique and other parts of Africa. The marimba is a popular instrument with the Chopi of the south-central coast, who are famous for their musical skill and dance.

=== Media ===
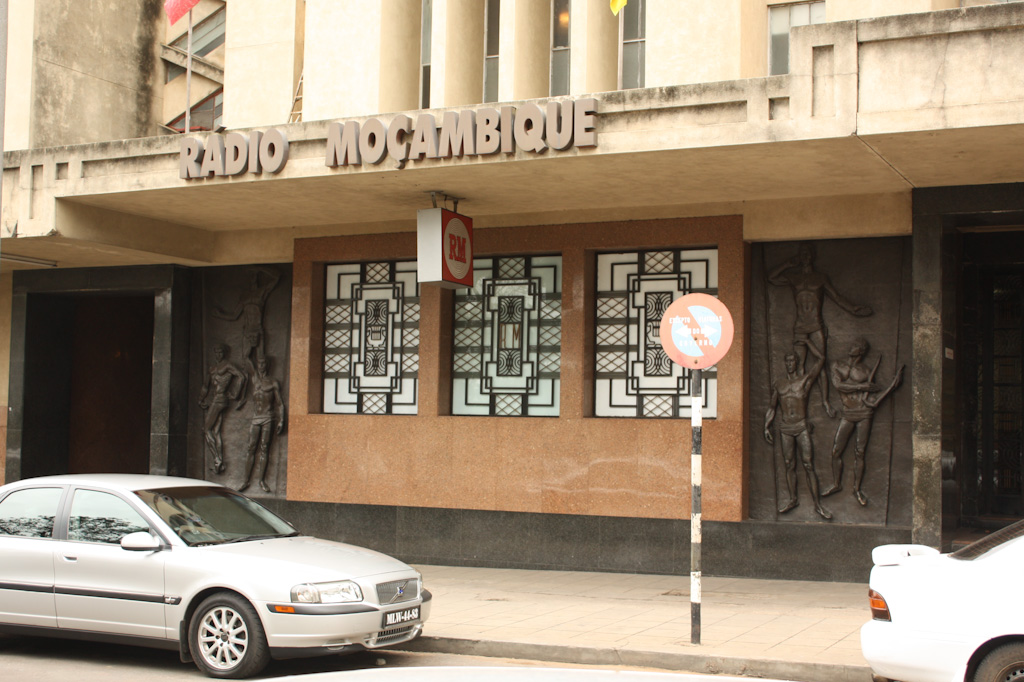
Headquarters of Rádio Moçambique in KaMpfumo district of Maputo (photo 2009)

Mozambican media is heavily influenced by the government. Newspapers have relatively low circulation rates because of high newspaper prices and low literacy rates. Among the most highly circulated newspapers are state-controlled dailies, such as Noticias and Diário de Moçambique, and the weekly Domingo. Their circulation is mostly confined to Maputo. Most funding and advertising revenue is given to pro-government newspapers.

Radio programmes are the most influential form of media in the country because of ease of access. State-owned radio stations are more popular than privately owned media. This is exemplified by the government radio station, Rádio Moçambique, the most popular station. It was established shortly after independence. The television stations watched by Mozambicans are STV, TIM, and TVM. Through cable and satellite, viewers can access tens of other African, Asian, Brazilian, and European channels.

=== Cuisine ===
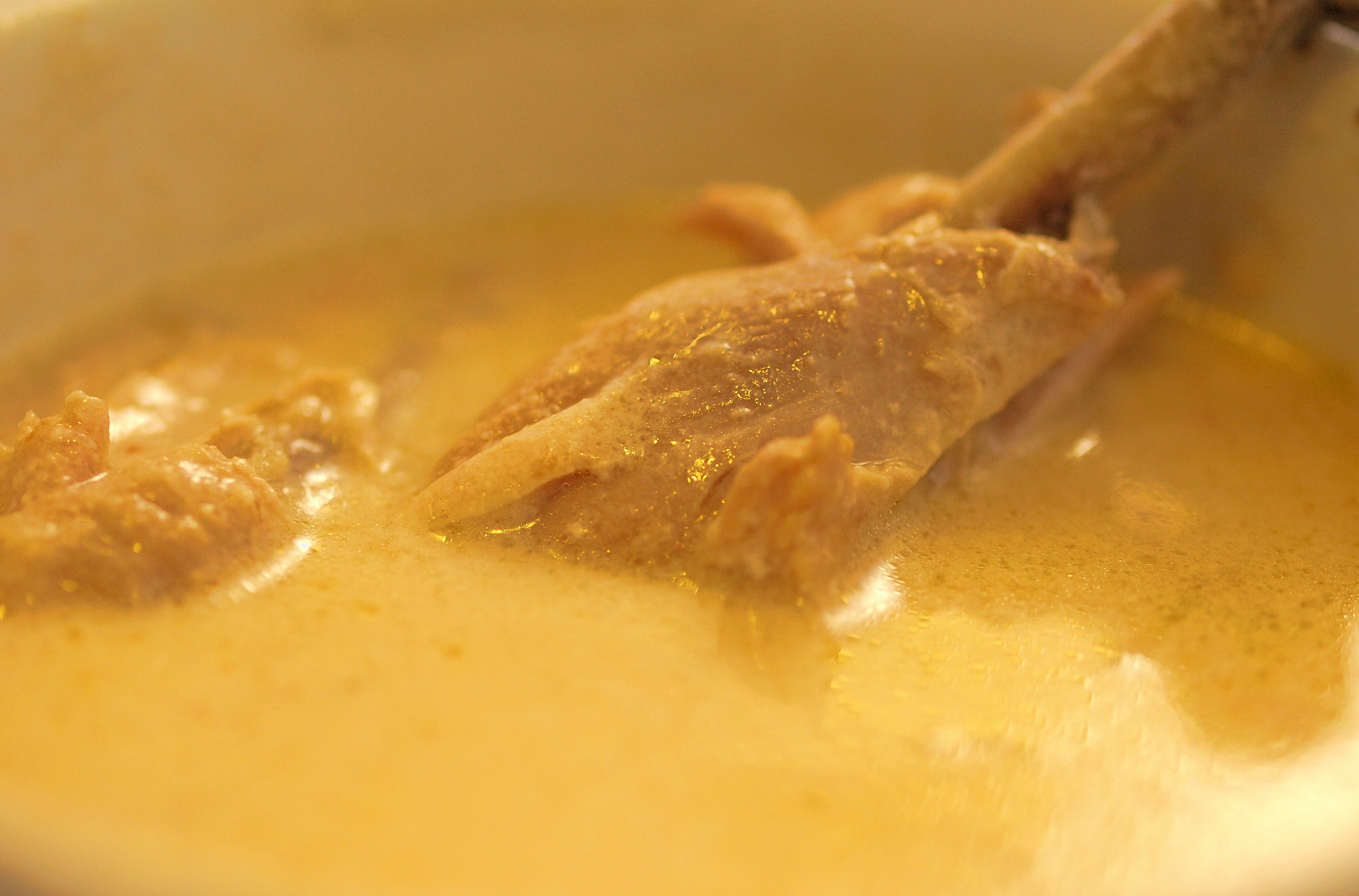
Caril de amendoim, a Mozambican peanut curry

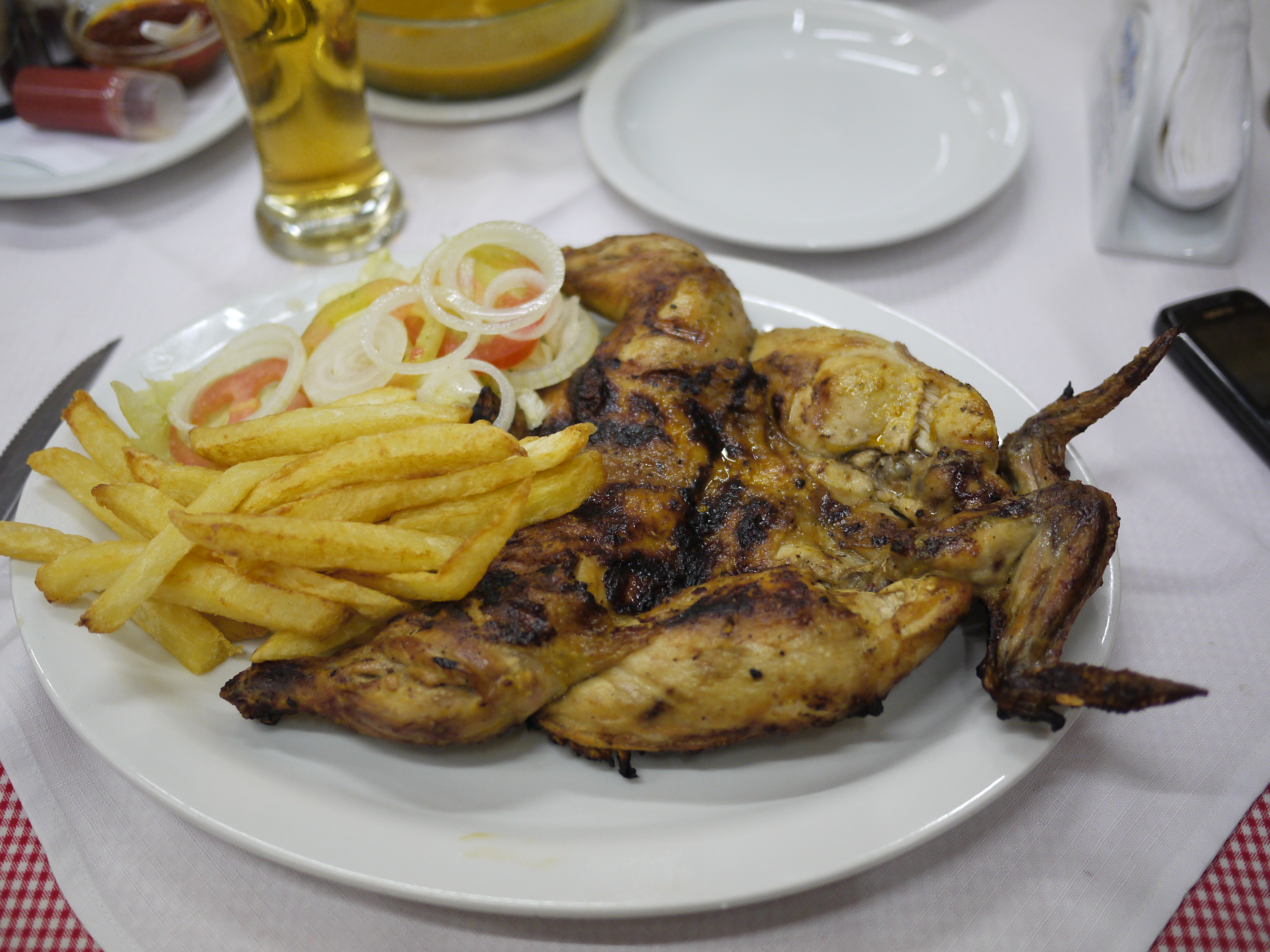
Chicken piri piri

With a nearly 500-year presence in the country, the Portuguese have greatly influenced Mozambican cuisine. Staples and crops such as cassava (a starchy root of Brazilian origin) and cashew nuts (also of Brazilian origin, though Mozambique was once the largest producer of these nuts), and pãozinho (pronounced [pɐ̃wˈzĩɲu], Portuguese-style buns), were brought in by the Portuguese. The use of spices and seasonings such as bay leaves, chili peppers, fresh coriander, garlic, onions, paprika, red sweet peppers, and wine were introduced by the Portuguese, as were maize, potatoes, rice, and sugarcane. espetada, the popular inteiro com piripiri (whole chicken in piri piri sauce), prego (steak roll), pudim (pudding), and rissóis (battered shrimp) are all common Portuguese dishes.

=== National holidays ===
Date	National holiday designation	Notes
1 January	Universal fraternity day	New year
3 February	Mozambican heroes day	In tribute to Eduardo Mondlane
7 April	Mozambican women day	In tribute to Josina Machel
1 May	International workers day	Workers' Day
25 June	National Independence day	Independence proclamation in 1975 (from Portugal)
7 September	Victory Day	In tribute to the Lusaka Accord signed in 1974
25 September	National Liberation Armed Forces Day	In tribute to the start of the armed fight for national liberation
4 October	Peace and Reconciliation	In tribute to the General Peace Agreement signed in Rome in 1992
25 December	Family Day	Christians also celebrate Christmas

=== Sport ===
Football (Portuguese: futebol) is the most popular sport. The national team is the Mozambique national football team. Track and field and basketball are also avidly followed in the country. Roller hockey is popular, and the best result for the national team was when they came in fourth at the 2011 FIRS Roller Hockey World Cup. The women's beach volleyball team finished 2nd at the 2018–2020 CAVB Beach Volleyball Continental Cup. The Mozambique national cricket team represents the nation in international cricket.

== See also ==
- Outline of Mozambique
- List of Mozambique-related topics
