= KaMpfumo =

- Municipal district
- Interactive map of KaMpfumo
- Country: Mozambique
- Time zone: UTC+2 (CAT)

KaMpfumo is one of seven municipal districts in Maputo, Mozambique.

The district is composed by the Bairros (Neighborhoods) of Central A, B and C; Alto Maé A and B; Malhangalene A and B; Polana Cimento A and B, Coop and Sommerschield.
