= Igrejas de Cristo =

Mozambique Protestant denomination

Igrejas de Cristo is a denomination of Mozambique. It is a Protestant church with approximately 200 congregations. It has at least a thousand members.
