= Telephone numbers in Mozambique =

- Country: Mozambique
- Continent: Africa
- Country code: +258
- International access: 00
- Long-distance: none

The following are the telephone codes in Mozambique.

== Calling formats ==
- yxxxx or yyy xxxxx - Calls inside Mozambique
- +258 yyy xxxxx or +258 yy xxxxxx or +258 yyy xxxxxx - Calls from outside Mozambique

The NSN length is 8 or 9 digits.

== List of area codes in Mozambique ==
LIST OF AREA CODES
Area Code	Area/City
21	Maputo
23	Beira
24	Quelimane
251	Manica
252	Tete
258	Vilanculos
26	Nampula
271	Lichinga
272	Pemba
281	Chokwé
282	Xai-Xai
293	Inhambane

== List of Mobile Numbers in Mozambique ==
LIST OF AREA CODES
Prefix	Operator
81	reserved
82	Mcel
83	Mcel
84	Vodacom
85	Vodacom
86	Movitel
87	Movitel
88	Movitel
89	reserved
