= University of Timbuktu =

Group of mosques in Timbuktu, Mali

"University of Timbuktu" is a modern collective term for a historical scholarly and teaching community which existed within in the city of Timbuktu in what is now Mali, associated with the mosques of Sankore, Djinguereber, and Sidi Yahya. The term refers to a scholastic community that endured for over a century during the late medieval period (in the 15th-16th centuries), producing a number of scholars and manuscripts, most notably within the Maliki school of Islamic jurisprudence.

The term "mosque-university of Sankore" was first coined by the French author and explorer Felix Dubois in 1897, and popularised as the "University of Sankore" by the Ghanaian politician Kwame Nkrumah in 1961, in reference to the mosque most associated with scholarship in Timbuktu. The term 'University of Timbuktu' first appeared in the writings of Flora Shaw, Baroness Lugard in 1905. Neither term was used during the medieval or early modern period, and there is in fact no evidence for the existence of an organised educational institution in Timbuktu equivalent to a medieval or modern university. Nonetheless the term remains popular as an expression of the level of scholarship and teaching achieved by Timbuktu's community of scholars and students. Historical studies of Timbuktu have greatly contributed to the modern understanding of Islamic scholarship and education in West Africa during the medieval and early modern period.

== History of Timbuktu ==
The city of Timbuktu developed out of a semi-permanent campsite established by the Tuareg people in the late 11th to early 12th century AD. Due to the Tuaregs having established the area as a way-station for supplies and provisions, which was often visited by travelers and merchants passing by, it eventually became a large trading city.

In the 14th-15th century Timbuktu developed into a commercial centre and a cultural centre of Islam as Walata, the previous hub of trans-Saharan trade in the region, began to decline in importance. In around 1325 AD, the Malian king Mansa Musa gained control of the city on his return from Mecca, where he had travelled to complete the Muslim pilgrimage known as the Hajj. Timbuktu was thus annexed to the growing Mali Empire, which had originated further to the west near the border between modern-day Mali and Guinea (Niani, the capital of the Mali empire, was in located in Guinea). Mansa Musa is said to have returned from the Hajj with several Islamic scholars whom he had encountered along the way, including the Andalusi scholar and architect Abu Ishaq al-Sahili, who he employed to establish the Djinguereber mosque and a royal residence in Timbuktu. Mansa Musa also sent Sudanese students to study in Fez in Morocco, which was renowned as a centre of scholarship and education in Maliki jurisprudence. In 1438, following the decline of the Mali Empire, Timbuktu was seized by the Tuareg, who controlled the city for the next thirty years. In 1468 Timbuktu subsequently came under the control of the expanding Songhay empire, which ruled the city until 1591.

The development of Timbuktu as an intellectual and scholarly centre primarily occurred in the 15th-16th centuries, reaching its peak in the 16th century when scholars in Timbuktu began to produce their own scholarly literature. When Ibn Battuta visited Timbuktu in 1352 he had nothing to say about Islamic learning there, but by a century later notable scholars had begun to settle in the town. Some scholars came from as far as Egypt, Fez, Awjila, Ghadames, and Tuat. Timbuktu subsequently acquired a reputation for Islamic learning and scholarship within the Sahel and North Africa. The 16th century is considered to be Timbuktu's intellectual "golden era", which was brought to an end by the invasion of Moroccan forces in 1591.

According to African scholar Shamil Jeppie in The Meanings of Timbuktu:

Timbuktu is a repository of history, a living archive which anybody with a concern for African history should be acquainted with. Timbuktu may be hard to get to but it played an essential role as a centre of scholarship under the Songhay state until the invasion from the rulers of Marrakesh in 1591, and even thereafter it was revived.

After Timbuktu was occupied in 1591 following the Battle of Tondibi, teaching in Timbuktu declined. Soon after, scholars of Timbuktu emigrated to other learning centers. In 1593, Sultan Ahmad I al-Mansur cited "disloyalty" as the reason for arresting, and subsequently killing or exiling, many of Timbuktu's scholars, including Ahmad Baba al Massufi, who was deported to Morocco.

== University ==
Although the scholastic community in Timbuktu is often described in modern sources as a 'university', there is in fact no evidence for the existence of any centralized teaching institution such as the term university implies. Instead the community consisted of individual scholars with their own collections of manuscripts and private students, with much of the day-to-day teaching taking place in scholar's houses. There was no official curriculum, no university diploma or degrees, or university library (nor any other public or open-access libraries). Some lectures or classes were given inside Timbuktu's mosques, though these were not educational institutions themselves. Whilst some scholars were financially supported by the king during the period of Songhay rule (in the late 15th-16th century), there was no funding for colleges or college endowments. According to the historian John Hunwick, "the Islamic tradition of learning (especially in Africa) is individualized rather than institutionalized ... what was taking place in Timbuktu should be viewed within the cultural context of Islamic civilisation, rather than being associated conceptually with a European-style institution."

Besides the community of scholars with their students, there were in the 16th century also numerous Quranic schools in Timbuktu where young boys were taught basic literacy and the Quran. According to the Tarikh al-Fattash there were 150-180 schools "where young boys were taught to read the Quran". Estimates for the total number of pupils in these Quranic schools range from 4,000 to 9,000 at their peak, including the transitory population of pupils sent from neighbouring towns and surrounding nomadic tribes. Such traditional elementary Quranic schools still exist today in Timbuktu and in other parts of the Sahel.

The number of higher-level students in Timbuktu who were able to attain the status of scholars (ulama) is estimated to have been 200-300. These were mostly drawn from a small number of wealthy families. According to the historian Shamil Jeppie only "a very small number" of students would proceed through to higher levels of Arabic and Islamic study. The absence of royally-funded colleges or libraries in Timbuktu can be explained by the elitist nature of academic study in the city, with membership of the scholarly community being mostly restricted to a wealthy minority.

== Mosques ==
Timbuktu scholars were associated with the three mosques of Sankore, Djingereber and Sidi Yahya. These made up an intellectual and spiritual centre during the golden age of Timbuktu (15th-16th century). These mosques are prime examples of earthen architecture, which are maintained by traditional maintenance techniques which continues to the present day. For one mosque, the Great Mosque of Djenne, the maintenance of the mosque is a festive community effort, which is known as the crépissage.

=== Sankore Mosque ===
The Sankore Mosque, c. 2006

The Sankoré mosque was the mosque chiefly associated with teaching in the 16th century. It was originally built in the 14th-15th centuries with the financial backing of a Tuareg woman of the Aghlal tribe. For over five centuries, the Sankore Mosque served as a significant religious and intellectual hub. It was especially prominent during the Askia dynasty (1493–1591). In 1578 AD, Qadi al-Aqib ibn Mahmud ibn Umar ibn Muhammad Aqit knocked down the sanctuary to have it rebuilt in accordance with the dimensions of the Kaaba of Mecca as well as adding a mihrab.

=== Djinguereber Mosque ===
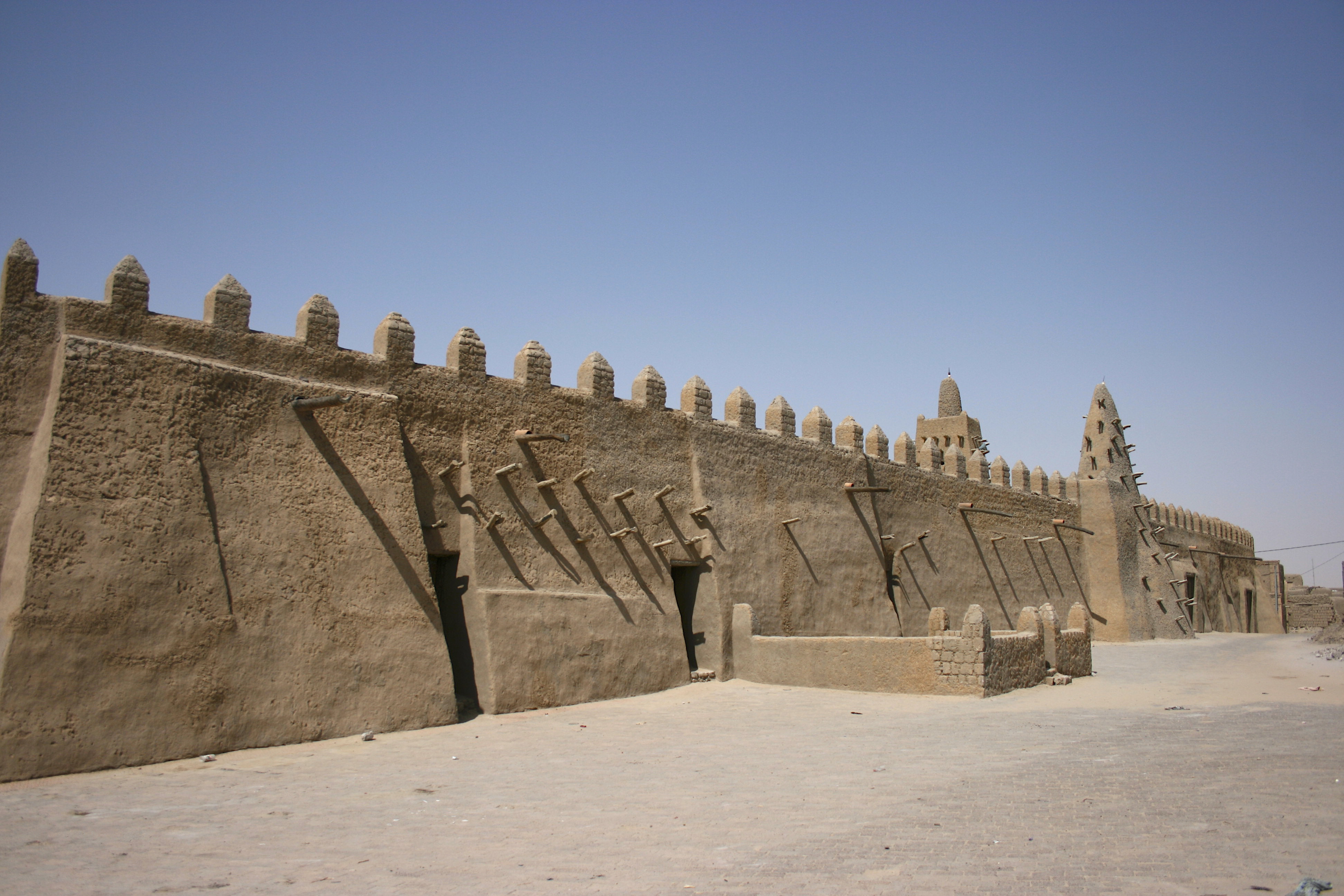
Exterior of the Djinguereber Mosque

The Djinguereber Mosque was initially built when Mansa Musa I returned from a pilgrimage to Mecca, but was reconstructed between 1570 and 1583 by Imam Al-Aqib ibn Mahmud, who was the qadi of Timbuktu. He added the southern portion of the mosque as well as the wall which surrounds the cemetery and situates itself to the west. The Djinguereber Mosque minaret is among the most noticeable landmarks of the Timbuktu landscape with its dominating structure. It is unclear if any advanced scholarship took place at the Djinguereber mosque, as only children are mentioned studying in its environs during the 16th century.

=== Sidi Yahya Mosque ===
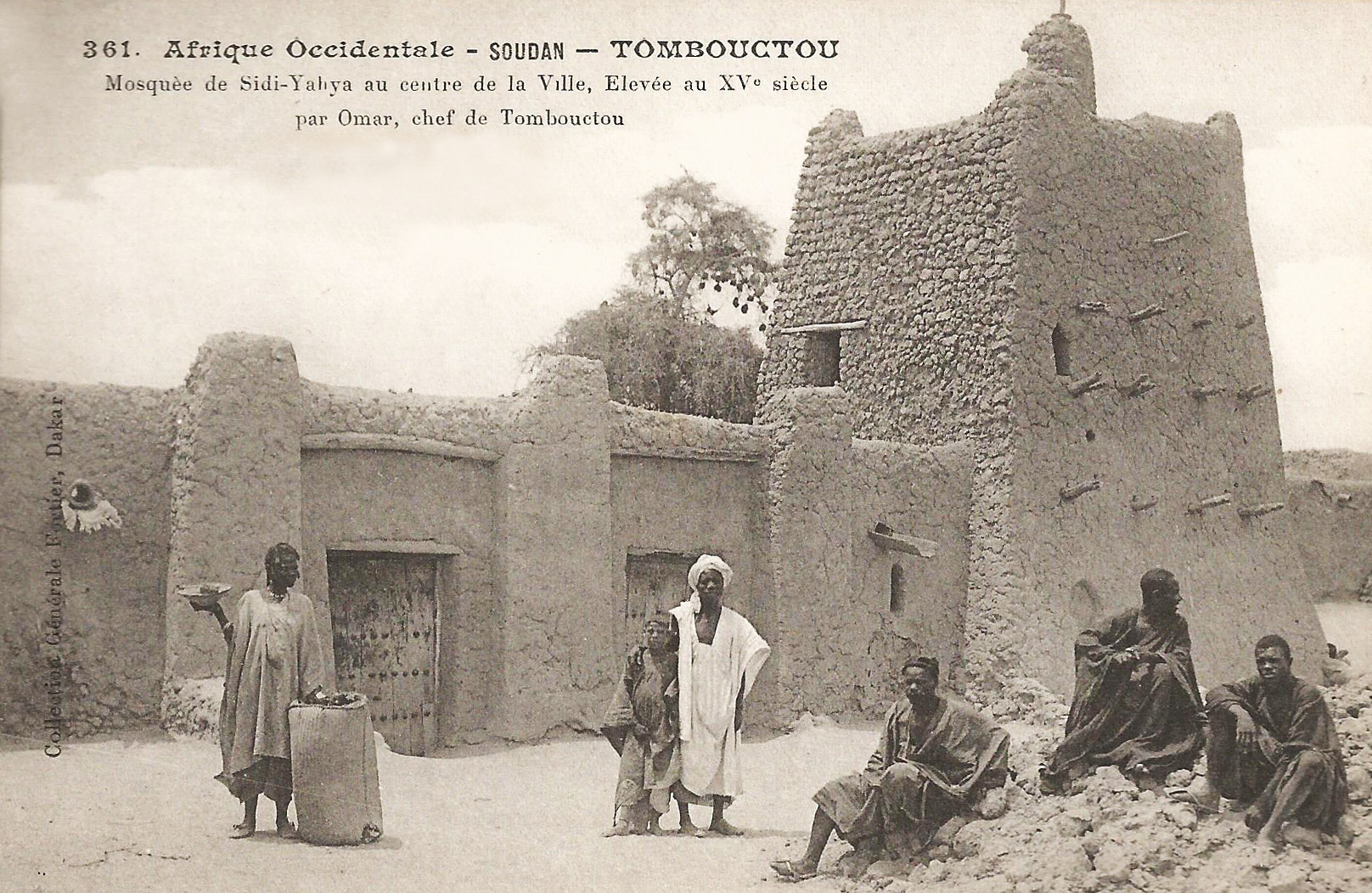
Early 20th century photo of the Sidi Yahya Mosque. The mosque was subsequently rebuilt and redesigned in 1939.

The Sidi Yahya Mosque was named after Sidi Yahya al-Tadallisi, a friend of the ruler Muhammad-n-Allah. The Sidi Yahia Mosque, located to the south of the Sankore Mosque, was erected around 1400 AD by the marabout Sheikh El Moktar Hamalla. It was built with the expectation of a holy man who would emerge some forty years later as Cherif Sidi Yahia, who would then be chosen as the Imam. Much like the other two mosques, Sidi Yahia was also restored by Imam Al Aqib from 1577 to 1588. The mosque was significantly rebuilt in 1939, resulting in its current appearance.

== Education ==
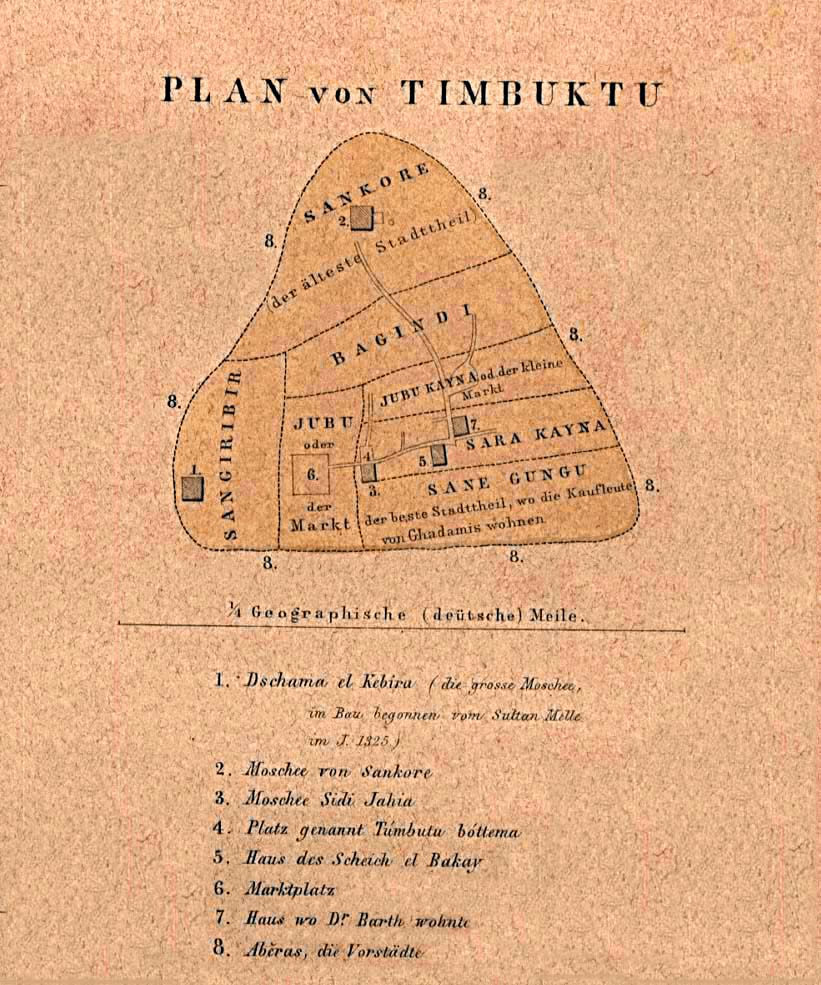
1855 AD map showing Timbuktu's three major mosques: The Sankore, Djinguereber, and Sidi Yahya

In Timbuktu scholar-teachers had their own private students, rather than working within an educational institution. Students often took instruction from several different tutors who specialised in their respective fields of study, and paid their tutors with money, goods, or services. Instruction usually took place in private residences or mosque courtyards, depending on the mosque and teachers' preferences. For example, the Sankoré mosque often held classes within its walls, and many scholars lived, studied, and taught in the Sankore quarter. Scholars in the Djinguereber and Sidi Yahya mosques more often would hold classes privately in their own houses, where their personal libraries could be used to assist the teachers. Teaching typically took place in small 'study circles' seated on the floor, known as Ḥalaqāt.

=== Students ===
Local historians from Timbuktu have claimed that in the late 15th-16th century Timbuktu had a population of 100,000 people with approximately 25,000 students. However the overwhelming majority of 'students' in Timbuktu were in fact pupils — young boys learning basic literacy and the Quran in numerous elementary Quranic schools within the city. The historian Elias N. Saad has estimated the total number of these pupils to be about 4,000-5,000, whilst the historian Michael A. Gomez gives a number of 7,500-9,000, divided between 150-180 Quranic schools. According to the 17th century Tarikh al-Fattash there were 150-180 schools in Timbuktu "where young boys were taught to read the Quran", and one of these schools is said to have had 123 writing boards belonging to the pupils. The figure of '25,000 students', which has been widely repeated in modern media sources, appears to have been obtained by multiplying this number of writing boards (123) by 180 schools to arrive at 22,140 pupils, rounded up to 25,000. This (inflated) number of elementary Quranic school pupils has subsequently been presented as the number of 'university students' in Timbuktu.

The number of higher-level students in Timbuktu who were able to attain the status of scholars (ulama) is estimated to have been 200-300, mostly drawn from wealthy families. Below this scholarly level was another socio-educational stratum of people known as Alfas, who were able to achieve a relatively substantial level of education beyond the elementary level. These could become elementary school teachers (mu‘allims), mosque functionaries, scribes or governmental secretaries, but for the most part they worked within the tailoring trade, which was a profession only open to Alfas, and which provided a means for students to earn a living as apprentices during their studies. Elias Saad describes Alfas as "an intermediate rank between fully qualified scholars and the whole range of literate persons in the city," which was "broadly defined in terms of its acquisition of some learning in tafsir and hadith beyond the level of elementary schools". Due to their specialization in laudatory poetry on the Prophet Muhammad, a substantial portion of Alfas were also identified as ‘Praise Singers’ or Muddah, which entitled them to some support through alms from wealthy scholars and notables, as well as to gifts made by state officials during Ramadan. According to the Tarikh al-Fattash, in the late sixteenth century Timbuktu boasted 26 tailoring houses, each with an average of 50 apprentices serving under its master. This gives a total of 1,300 people who may have been students pursuing education beyond an elementary level whilst supporting themselves as apprentices. However, Saad suggests that some of these 'apprentices' were in fact adults who continued to attach themselves to particular tailoring houses well beyond the stage of training, in order to secure their supply of textiles.

According to the historian Shamil Jeppie, for the majority of learners in Timbuktu "rote learning of some or all the short chapters from the thirtieth (and last) part of the Quran, a few prayers, or lines of devotional poetry recited on special nights were all the Arabic they would ever learn." A 'handful' would proceed to learn more than this minimum, and "a very small number" would proceed through to the higher levels of Arabic and Islamic study.

The historian R. Mauny estimated that in the 15th-16th century Timbuktu had a population of 25,000 inhabitants, whilst Elias N. Saad gives a figure of up to 50,000 inhabitants in the 16th century. European visitors to Timbuktu in the 19th century estimated a population at that time of 10,000-13,000, with an additional 'floating' population of up to 10,000.

=== Teaching ===
Pedagogy in Timbuktu was in line with traditional Islamic teaching methods. The teacher would dictate a lesson and the student was expected to write down said dictation. After revising the written version with the teacher, the student would then be expected to study it. At some points, along with the texts the student wrote, the student would learn from other texts, along with their respective commentaries. This method is still widely used in the Islamic world. Students would write their teacher's dictation in vocalized texts (harakat), which is only seen in the Quran and educational works such as grammars and law. Religious studies were taught in Arabic instead of the indigenous languages spoken in Timbuktu. This hindered the mosques' popularity among people who were outside of the clergy.

Based on his analysis of manuscripts from Timbuktu and other historical evidence, the historian Charles C. Stewart has suggested that at its height in the 16th century, Timbuktu scholarship was "a controlled, elitist preserve of mainly two lineages that seem to have catered to external commercial interests more so than the expansion of a local Islamic culture."

Upon completion of studies, students were given a turban to wear, along with an ijazah (licence) that gave the students authorization to teach a specific text or group of texts. Each ijazah's value was dependent of the quality of the teacher who gave it.

=== Curricula ===
While there was no 'official curriculum' in Timbuktu, certain texts were fundamental across generations. The Quran, Sahih al-Bukhari, Sahih Muslim, and Kitab al-Shifa were core texts for most students. Below them in order of prominence were important works in the Maliki school of thought such as: the fatwas of Ahmed al-Wanashiri, the Risala of Ibn Abi Zayd, and the Mukhtasar of Khalil ibn Ishaq.

Subjects studied by higher-level students and scholars included Islamic law, geography, astronomy, medicine, and even history, despite the fact that history was never part of any teaching curriculum in the Islamic world at the time.

== Notable scholars ==
There was a succession of scholars and imams in Timbuktu, many associated with the Sankore mosque.

=== Abu Hafs ===
Abu Hafs Umar ibn al-hajj Ahmad ibn Umar ibn Muhammad Aqit (fl.16th century AD) was a grammarian and eulogist in the Sankore mosque. He was arrested by Pasha Mahmud Zarqunin and exiled to Marrakesh, Morocco until his death. This exile was considered unjust, and as a result, Abu Hafs is viewed as a martyr.

=== Al-Aqib Aqit ===
Qadi al-Aqib ibn Mahmud ibn Umar ibn Muhammad Aqit (1507 – August 10, 1583) was a Sanhaja Berber, qadi of Timbuktu, and an Imam of the Sankore mosque. He was born to the Sanhaja Berber Aqit family where he studied under his father and uncle. He then went to make the hajj, where he studied under leading scholars like al-Nasir al-Laqani who certified him to teach a number of manuscripts. The famed Ahmad Baba, who was his cousin once removed, studied under him, and received an ijazah. In 1565, al-Aqib succeeded his brother, Qāḍī Muḥammad, as the Qadi of Timbuktu.

In 1569 AD, he began rebuilding the Sidi Yahya Mosque, and, in 1570 AD, renovated The Djinguereber Mosque, followed by The Sūq Mosque in 1577 AD. He rebuilt the Sankore mosque the following year.

When he died he was succeeded as Qadi by his brother Abu Hafs Umar.

=== Abu al-Tuwati ===
Sidi Abu 'l-Qasim al-Tuwati (d. 1528/29) was the successor of Qadi Katib Musa in the Sankore mosque. He was notable for establishing recitation of the entire Quran after Friday prayers.

=== Ahmad Baba ===
Abu 'l-'Abbas Ahmad Baba bin Ahmad bin Ahmad bin 'Umar bin Muhammad Aqit al-Sinhaji al-Timbukti (21 Dhu 'l-Hijja 963 AH (26 October 1556) – 6 Sha'ban 1036 AH (22 April 1627)) was a popular jurist. He was born into a family who were a part of a long line of jurists. He was well known for the high quality of his fatwas, and is well known in modern times for his works being the main foundation of history concerning the history and lineages of medieval West African jurists and medieval Moroccan religious practices. He wrote over sixty texts in his lifetime covering various disciplines that ranged from grammars to philosophy.

Ahmad was born in Araouane and was raised in Timbuktu where he studied under his father Ahmad, his uncle Abu Bakr and Ahmad b. Mohammad, who was a distant relative of his. However, his principal teacher was Muhammad b. Mahmud b. Abu Bakr al-Wangari, a well known and respected scholar at the time.

He studied the main disciplines pertaining to Islamic learning of his time under Wangari, including Arabic, usul, mantiq and tafsir, with his speciality being on Maliki school of Islamic thought. Little is known about Ahmad's scholarly work in Timbuktu prior to his and some of his family's deportation to Morocco in 1594, as they were accused of undermining the rule and authority of the Moroccan invaders. He arrived in Marrakesh on 1 Ramadan 1002 (21 May 1594), where he was either jailed or put under house arrest. His two-year house arrest in Morocco was liberal, as Ahmad was able to teach at the Jami' al-Shurafa' in Marrakesh and attracted many students scholars until his release on 21 Ramadan 1004–19 May 1596. However, the Sultan had decided to keep him in Morocco.

After being released by Sultan Moulay Zaidan, Ahmad arrived back in Timbuktu on 10 Dhu 'l-Qa'da 1016 AH (26 February 1608). Although not much is known about the chronology of his works, he wrote the Nail al-ibtihaj, his major work, as well as its abridgement, Kifayat al-muhtaj, whilst he was still in Morocco.

The Nail al-ibtihaj bi-tatriz al-Dibaj was a biographical dictionary of Maliki jurisprudents, containing within it a voluminous amount of information on North African scholars and is the primary source of information for when it comes to the life and works produced by medieval West African Muslim scholars. This was his greatest contribution to scholarship.

== Historical book trade ==
A significant trade of books was established in Timbuktu in the 16th century. The manuscripts were produced in the Arabic script and were primarily written in the Arabic language. Local languages such as Songhai, Fulfulde, Soninke and Bambara are also attested in some texts from the 18th century or later (written in adapted Arabic script known as ajami).

Leo Africanus described this book trade when he visited Timbuktu in 1512 AD:

"Here are great store of doctors, judges, priests, and other learned men, that are bountifully maintained at the kings cost and charges. And hither are brought diverse manuscripts or written books out of Barbarie, which are sold for more money than any other merchandize."

Some scholars accumulated large private libraries, such as Ahmed Baba's collection of over 1600 manuscripts, which he described as "the smallest library of any of my kin". Manuscripts were copied by local students, giving them a means to earn a living during their studies. Some works written in Timbuktu were also exported to North Africa, however "the flow of books into Timbuktu naturally outpaced the number of books Timbuktu exported to the outside world". A significant factor in the high cost of manuscripts was the absence of a local paper production industry in West Africa, which meant that all paper had to be imported from North Africa or Egypt. Most of the paper used in Timbuktu and the broader Sudanic region was produced in Europe.

== Manuscripts ==
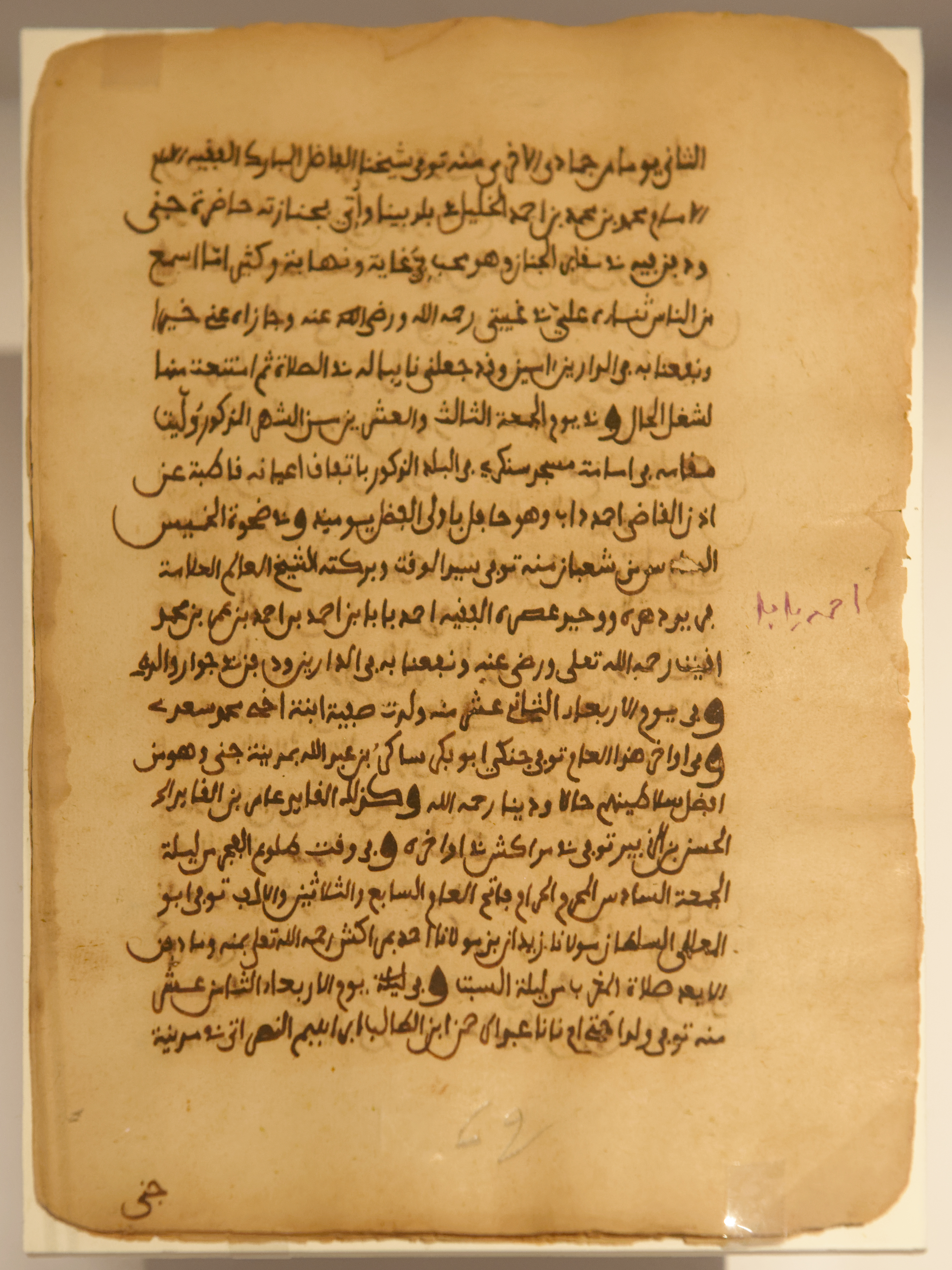
Page from the 17th century Ta'rīkh al-Fattāsh

Approximately 400,000 documents dating from the 14th to the 20th century, including single pages and fragments as well as longer works, are said to be held in the private collections and institutional libraries of Timbuktu. These are commonly referred to as the 'Timbuktu manuscripts', though they include every kind of written document and were produced by both local and foreign writers. The Ahmed Baba Institute in Timbuktu defines a 'manuscript' as "all works handwritten in the Arabic script by Malian and foreign writers of past centuries: literary books, legal agreements, correspondence and other documents."

A consortium of 35 private collections known as SAVAMA-DCI (Sauvegarde et Valorisation des Manuscrits pour la Défense de la Culture Islamique) collectively holds the largest number of documents from Timbuktu, with approximately 350,000 items, including the collection of the Mamma Haidara Commemorative Library. The publicly-funded Ahmed Baba Institute holds approximately 30,000 documents. Other private libraries with their own collections include the Fondo Kati with 7,000 documents, the al-Wangari library with 3,000 documents and the al-Imam Essayouti library with 2,700 documents.

Some researchers have criticised the practice of referring to all of these documents as 'manuscripts'. According to the historian Charles C. Stewart, "the exhaustive listings in SAVAMA inventories in which each page of an identifiable work is recorded as a separate manuscript result in some oddly lopsided data on the importance of some authors as well as some very inflated numbers of manuscripts." The historian Bruce S. Hall has stated that there is "a tendency to exaggerate the number of manuscripts", and that it has become customary at the Ahmed Baba Institute "to claim any scrap of paper with Arabic writing as a unique manuscript." According to Hall this tendency to exaggerate "can be dated fairly precisely to the moment in the late 1990s when Western money – especially from American foundations such as Mellon and Ford – started to pour into Timbuktu to support infrastructure, institutional development, and manuscript restoration and preservation efforts." According to the historian Jean-Louis Triaud, the "media frenzy" surrounding Timbuktu has been accompanied by the circulation of "fantastic" and "uncontrolled" claims regarding the number of manuscripts, "marked by inflation and exaggeration, and primarily intended to attract funders."

The large majority of manuscripts from Timbuktu consist of one or two pages. Stewart and Hall note that many manuscripts are copies (usually of foreign works), and often only extracts or fragments, rather than individual works in themselves. These are typically copies of a core group of texts studied both in Africa and elsewhere in the Muslim world. Stewart gives the example of two foreign works with a combined total of 1,033 copies, each of which is counted in the SAVAMA-DCI database as a separate manuscript.

Bruce Hall estimates the number of unique works produced by local authors in Mali (including Timbuktu and other areas, dating from the medieval period to the 20th century) to be less than 10,000 works, including commentaries and versifications of core texts in the Islamic canon, with a minority of longer and more significant texts.

=== Dating ===
Most of the manuscripts or documents from Timbuktu remained undated or only vaguely dated by archivists prior to recent studies which have sought to more rigorously ascertain their provenance and contents. In his 2021 analysis of the SAVAMA-DCI libraries, the largest collection by far of historical documents from Timbuktu, Charles C. Stewart found that most of the documents, with very few exceptions, are not 'ancient', but rather of 20th century provenance, with little if any link to Timbuktu's "somewhat romanticized medieval scholarly past". Rather than being preserved medieval manuscripts or later copies of medieval works written in Timbuktu, the SAVAMA-DCI collections instead consist mostly of 20th century writings, as well as copies of Islamic works from the Middle East and North Africa, providing "a unique opening to the intellectual makeup of Islamic Africa in the twentieth century." Out of 20,000 SAVAMA-DCI records containing author information, Stewart found only four texts dating from Timbuktu’s “Golden Age” in the 16th century, three of which were only one page long and one which was eleven pages long. According to Stewart, "Despite the claim in much of the hype about the Timbuktu manuscripts that they are an embodiment of classical Islamic learning dating back to the sixteenth century, this is not reflected in the contents of these libraries ... Clearly, most of these are not libraries of any great historical depth."

It is unclear what percentage of the documents held by the Ahmed Baba Institute or other private libraries date back to the 16th century or earlier, either as preserved manuscripts or later copies of older texts. According to Jean-Louis Triaud, most of the Timbuktu manuscripts date from "no earlier than the end of the 17th century, and many are even more recent." However, many manuscripts are copies of older works.

The earliest surviving text written in Timbuktu is a religious treatise by the scholar Muḥammad al-Kābarī dating from c. 1450 AD. The Bustān al-Fawāʾid wa-l-Manāf (“The Garden of Excellences and Benefits”) is al-Kābarī's only surviving text and perhaps the only surviving text from West Africa dating from before the sixteenth century.

The oldest text in the al-Imam Essayouti library dates from 1615 AD, with the majority of texts having been written between the 18th and 20th centuries.

=== Contents ===
According to Charles C. Stewart, the two subject-areas which most preoccupied scholars in Timbuktu and the surrounding region were Arabic grammar and "derivative writing in matters of jurisprudence", focusing on the "localization or indigenization" of classical Islamic works. The vast majority of manuscripts from Timbuktu that are longer than a single page are concerned with one or another branch of the Islamic religious sciences (i.e. Islamic subjects such as jurisprudence, Arabic grammar, theology, religious biography and ethics).

Some texts such as Muḥammad al-Kābarī's mid-15th century treatise combine theological aspects with a discussion of 'esoteric secrets', 'special prayers' (for protection, healing, sexual potency etc) and the use of magical talismans. According to the researcher Khaoula Trad, manuscripts from Timbuktu contain 'extended and rich material' on magical and esoteric subjects, including a preoccupation with talismanic figures.

A small fraction of the Timbuktu manuscripts consist of texts dealing with astronomy and other scientific subjects. These appear to be mostly copies of texts originally written outside of West Africa, often by famous medieval authors. There are also a number of texts on medicine written by both local and foreign authors. These are by far the most numerous texts amongst the science-related manuscripts.

Most of the science-related manuscripts from Timbuktu belong to the category of "folk scientific tradition", including topics such as arithmetic and naked-eye astronomical observation. Astronomy was studied in order to solve religious and practical problems, such as determining times for prayer, the direction of prayer towards Mecca, and maintaining an Islamic calendar. An example of a text written in Timbuktu is a short treatise by Ahmed Baba concerned with calculating the beginning of the month of January in the Islamic lunar year 1023 (1614 AD). There is also evidence of the recording of some astronomical events, such as the following description by Mahmud Kati of a meteor shower in 1583 AD:

“In the year 991 [1583] in God’s month of Rajab the Goodly [August 1583] after half the night had passed, stars flew around the sky as if fire had been kindled in the whole sky – east, west, north and south. It became a mighty flame lighting up the earth, and people were extremely disturbed about that. It continued until after dawn."

The study and practice of mathematics in Timbuktu consisted predominantly of arithmetic used for the calculation of inheritances and commercial transactions. An example of a mathematical text held within the Timbuktu libraries is an 18th century commentary by the Moroccan scholar al-Rasmuki on a work by the 16th century Moroccan mathematician al-Samlali, which demonstrates the rules of addition, subtraction, multiplication, and division, as well as providing a brief history of the development of mathematics. This text was used extensively by students in Timbuktu and throughout North Africa. Some other imported works contain more advanced or theoretical material, such as manuscripts on optics and geometry.

Some manuscripts are concerned with astrology and mysticism, such as an 18th century text by the Timbuktu author al-Ghalawi which combines astronomical information with a discussion of horoscopes.

A statistical study carried out in the 2000s established the following distribution of categories within the manuscript collection of the Ahmed Baba Institute: Law and jurisprudence: 28%; letters: 24%; history of the Muslim world: 20%; panegyrics of scholars and other renowned figures: 10%; grammar: 10%; Quran and Quranic exegesis: 4%; science: 2%. Bruce Hall has estimated that there are about 3,000 manuscripts of significant length in the Ahmed Baba Institute collection, along with many single-page documents including letters, contracts and poems (etc), which bring the total number of items to around 30,000.

Charles C. Stewart's 2021 study of the SAVAMA-DCI libraries estimated the following distribution of categories within the SAVAMA manuscripts: Quran: 1%; Arabic language: 4%; belief/theology: 23%; Sufism: 8%, Prophet Muhammad/Hadith: 19%; literature/poetry: 10%; jurisprudence: 17%; conduct/ethics/spiritual counsel: 16%; sciences: 3%. The libraries also include over 7,000 letters. Approximately 75% of SAVAMA-DCI manuscripts consist of one- or two-page items without named authors, many of which are what Stewart calls "study sheets" (short excerpts from the Islamic canon and local authorities, used for study or memorisation). According to Stewart, the SAVAMA-DCI libraries contain little extended writing in the Islamic disciplines by local authors. The paucity of texts on the Arabic language further suggests the existence of an 'oligoliterate culture', where Arabic literacy was monopolised by a small minority. The absence of subjects like logic indicates that "legal reasoning was not a part of the limited juridical writing", which appears to have been mostly concerned with religious duties. Stewart concludes that "These libraries document well the fact that Timbuktu was not the center of West African Islamic scholarship that popular belief has wanted it to be."

The al-Imam Essayouti library includes copies of classic Islamic works, as well as local fatwas, ijazahs, letters and historical notes. The collection is also notable for its copies of late 18th-19th century political and religious treatises written by founders of the Sokoto Caliphate, such as Usman Dan Fodio, and writings by the prominent Kunta family.

Approximately 200 unique works appear regularly in manuscript collections; these are usually didactic (teaching) texts written in late medieval Egypt or North Africa.

A large number of documents from Timbuktu consist of commercial or legal records, containing information on subjects such as the sale and purchase of slaves, livestock, salt, tea, homes and agricultural lands, or the execution and distribution of estates and bequests, the determination of dowries, disputes over water wells, and records on the manumission of slaves.

=== Current condition ===
The manuscripts were mainly found in a collection of loose leaves placed within a loose cover or even just tightened with a ribbon. Due to the lack of a sewing structure or any link between the text blocks and covers, knowing whether any bookbinding structures existed or not is a difficult task for many codicologists. What further complicates this is that covers wrapping numerous leaves may have been moved from one text block to another. A manuscript could consist of a variety of texts and documents and can be made of a varying number of leaves ranging from just one to a few hundred. Today, the Timbuktu manuscripts are primarily preserved in private family collections which are where they have traditionally been kept and in the Ahmed Baba Institute, a state-funded entity.

=== Post-2012 crisis ===
In 2013, al-Qaeda in the Islamic Maghreb (AQIM) captured northern Mali and destroyed many of the manuscripts in an attempt to implement their jihad against any idea or practice which did not conform to their own vision of a pure Islamic society. However, AQIM had only destroyed a portion of the manuscripts as most of them were taken outside of the city to the capital, Bamako, in an initiative led by Abdel Kader Haidara, the son of a respected Malian scholar, Mohammed 'Mamma' Haidara, who in addition to being a scholar was also the owner of a family library which had a considerable number of manuscripts. Haidara did this with the help of the NGO SAVAMA-DCI (Sauvegarde et Valorisation des Manuscripts pour la Défense de la Culture Islamique), of which Haidara is the Executive President. Haidara worked alongside members of the local community in an effort to remove the manuscripts from areas which were susceptible to AQIM activity.

== Notable works ==
=== Tarikh al-Sudan ===
The Tarikh al-Sudan was a written work created by Abd al-Rahman and completed in 1655. It details the history of the Middle Niger region beginning from the founding of Timbuktu until the invasion and occupation of Ahmed al-Mansur of Morocco. These records were sourced from previous written and oral histories about the same subject. This work is highly credited as being one of the most important primary sources that discusses about the history of the Middle Niger region.

=== Tarikh al-Fattash ===
The Ta'rīkh al-Fattāsh is a written work created by Mahmud Kati, but completed in 1665 by his three sons and grandson. It chronicles the history of the Middle Niger region, similar to the Tarikh al-Sudan. The Soninke author of Ta'rikh al-Fattash, Ibn al-Mukhtar, recorded the oral tradition surrounding the origin of the Mali kingdom four hundred years earlier. Ibn al-Mukhtar states:

The kingdom of Mali rose to power only after the fall of the kingdom of Kaya-Magha, ruler of the whole western region. Until then the king of Mali was merely one of the vassals of the Kaya-Magha, one of his officials and ministers. Kaya-Mahga in the Wa'Kore (Soninke) language means 'king of gold'. ... The name of Kaya-Magha's capital was Qunbi.

== See also ==
- List of Islamic educational institutions
- Education in Mali
