= Mohammed Bagayogo =

Malian academic

Shaykh Mohammed Bagayogo
- Title: Imam of Sidi Yahya Mosque

Personal life
- Born: 930 AH | 1523–1524 CE Djenné, Songhai Empire
- Died: 1002 AH | 1594 CE Timbuktu, Songhai Empire
- Parent: Qadi Mahmud Bagayogo (father)
- Education: Studied Arabic and Islamic law under his father and maternal uncle. He studied jurisprudence and hadith under Aḥmad b. Muḥammad b. Saʿīd, including the Mukhtaṣar of Khalīl, the Mudawwana and the Muwaṭṭaʾ.
- Known for: Teaching Aḥmad Bābā al-Timbuktī and serving as imam of the Sidi Yahya Mosque
- Other names: Muhammad Baghayogho al-Wangari; Muhammad b. Mahmud b. Abi Bakr al-Wangari al-Timbukti al-Jinnawi
- Occupation: Islamic scholar, jurist, teacher and imam

Religious life
- Religion: Islam
- Denomination: Sunni
- Institute: Sankore Madrasah
- Jurisprudence: Maliki
- Creed: Ash'ari

Muslim leader
- Teacher: Aḥmad b. Muḥammad b. Saʿīd; Qadi Mahmud Bagayogo
- Based in: Timbuktu
- Post: De facto qadi of Timbuktu by 1583
- Students: Aḥmad Bābā al-Timbuktī

Mohammed Bagayogo Es Sudane Al Wangari Al Timbukti (1523-1593) was a scholar from Timbuktu, Songhai Empire. Baghayogho originated from among the Juula people, who are a Mande ethnic group composed of merchants and scholars.

== History ==
He was born in Djenné in 1523, the son of Qadi Mahmud Bagayogo. As a youth he attended the majlis of Aḥmad b. Muḥammad b. Sa’īd, where he studied the Mukhtasar, along with the Mudawwana of Sahnun and the Muwatta Imam Malik along with his brother Ahmad. When Askia Daoud asked him to become Djenne's qadi like his father, he resisted the appointment (as had his father, to Askia Ishaq I) and took shelter in the mosque with his brother for several months before escaping to Timbuktu with their teacher.

Bagayogo eventually became the Sheikh and teacher of the famous scholar Ahmed Baba at the Sankore Madrasah, one of three philosophical schools in Mali during West Africa's golden age (i.e. 12th-16th centuries); the other two were Sidi Yahya Mosque and Djinguereber Mosque. By 1583 he was a prominent enough leader that he served as de facto Qadi of Timbuktu after the death of Al-Qadi Aqib ibn Mahmud ibn Umar, issuing judgments in front of the Sidi Yahya Mosque. Bagayogo, with most of the rest of Timbuktu, backed the Balma'a's rebellion against Askia Muhammad Bani in 1588, but survived the purges led by his successor Askia Ishaq II. He died on July 7, 1593, in the old town of Timbuktu.

== Legacy ==
In addition to his erudition, Mohammed Bagayogo is remembered for his refusal to comply with Moroccan occupiers. A significant amount of his writing has been preserved in manuscript form at the Ahmed Baba Institute, a repository for African literature. Some of the manuscripts found their way into French museums. A project is under way to digitalise these manuscripts which will lead to better understanding of the culture that flourished in Mali in the medieval period.
