= Sidi Yahya Mosque =

Mosque and madrassa in Timbuktu, Mali

- جامع سيدي يحيى; Mosquée Sidi Yahya
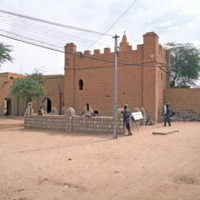

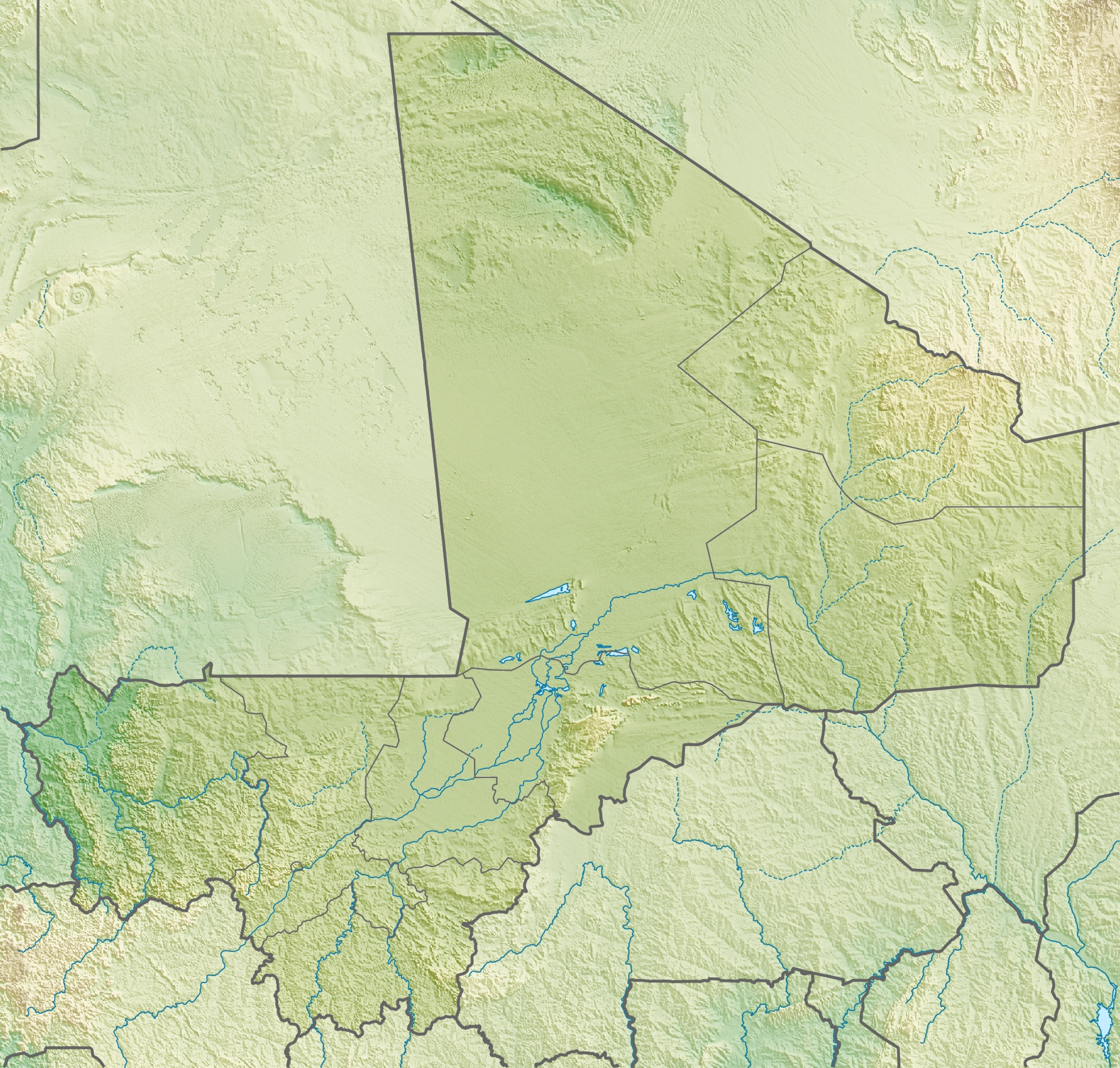
- Location within Mali

Religion
- Affiliation: Islam

Location
- Location: Timbuktu, Tombouctou, Mali
- Coordinates: 16°46′20″N 3°00′26″W

Architecture
- Style: Sudano-Sahelian
- Completed: 1440

Specifications
- Minaret: 1
- Materials: Banco, Ronnier wood

The Sidi Yahya Mosque (Arabic: جامع سيدي يحيى; French: Mosquée Sidi Yahya), also known as the Mosque of Muhammad-n-Allah, is a mosque and madrasa of Timbuktu in Mali. The construction of the mosque began in 1400 under the leadership of Sheikh el-Mokhtar Hamalla of Timbuktu and was finished in 1440. The mosque was significantly rebuilt in 1939, resulting in its modern appearance.

The mosque was named after its first imam, Sidi Yahya al-Tadelsi. It is associated with the historical community of scholars and students known today as the "University of Timbuktu", along with the mosques of Djinguereber and Sankore. The original mosque was a typical example of earthen Sudano-Sahelian architecture but also exhibited distinctive forms of plan and ornament. Parts of the modern mosque of Sidi Yahya were destroyed by Ansar Dine jihadists on 2 July 2012, following the Battle of Gao. These elements were later reconstructed under the direction of UNESCO team.

== History ==
The construction of the mosque of Sidi Yahya, sometimes written Sidi Yahia, began in 1400 by Sheikh El-Mokhtar Hamalla. The Sidi Yahya mosque is one of the oldest mosques in Timbuktu and holds special significance: when the Touareg under their leader Akil took control of Timbuktu in 1433, they gave the chieftaincy to Mohammed Naddi, a Senhaja from Chinguetti who commissioned the mosque. It took 40 years to complete. In 1441 Mohamed Naddah, the city-governor of Timbuktu, appointed his close friend Sidi Yahya al-Tadelsi, who was later venerated as a saint, as its first imam. Sidi Yayha's tomb is located in the mosque, which has meant it has historically attracted many visitors including Timbuktu's most renowned scholar, Ahmad Baba. The construction of Sidi Yahya as a madrassa allowed a massive expanse in the exchange of knowledge in Mali. Little is known about the mosque and its imams in the interval from 1468 to 1583, only that it was restored in 1569 by Qadi el-Aqib. The mosque was significantly rebuilt in 1939, resulting in its modern appearance.

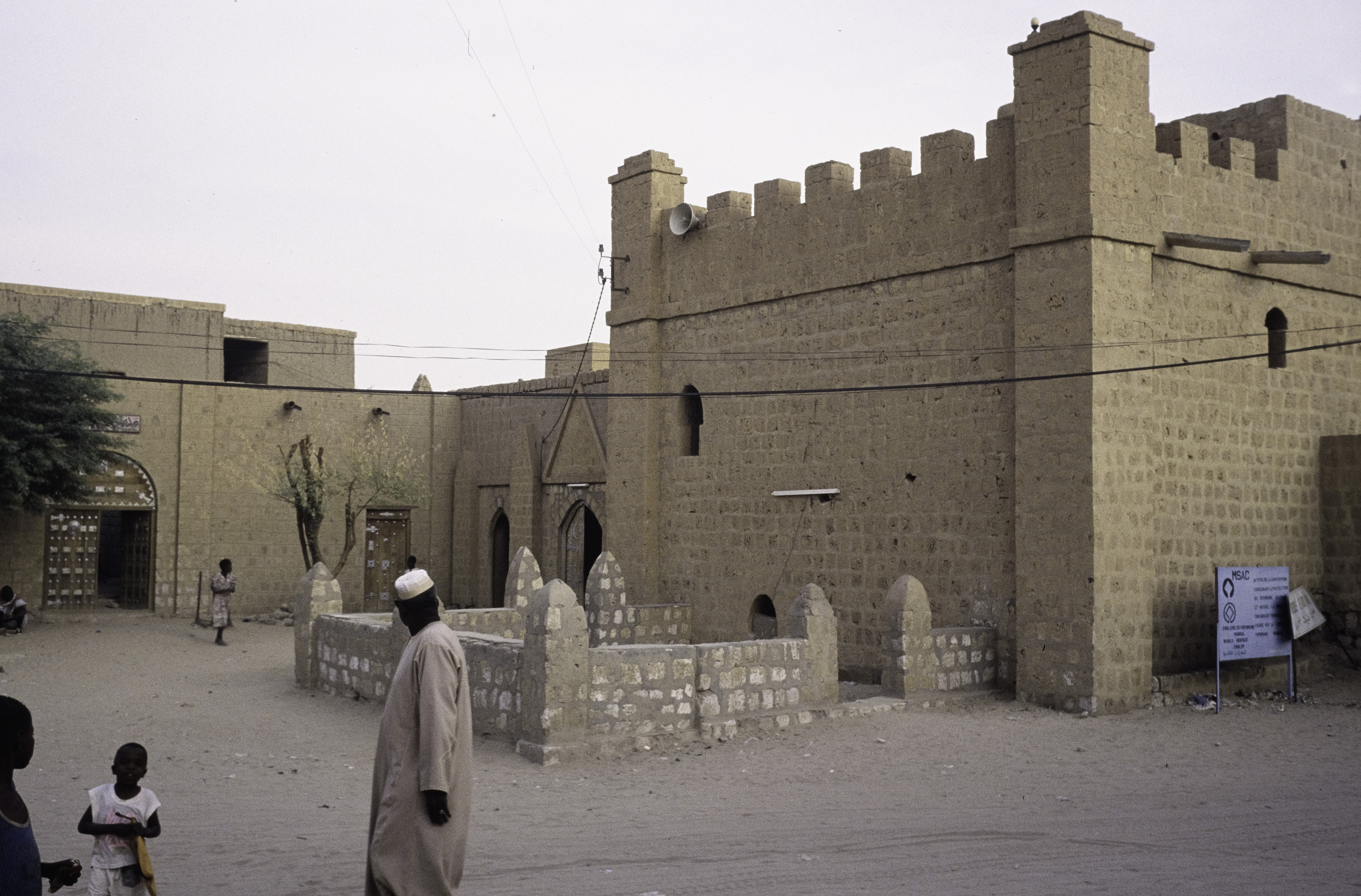
The modern Sidi Yahya Mosque, dating from 1939, with subsequent renovations

In 1990, the government of Mali requested admission for the city of Timbuktu to UNESCO's list of World Heritage in Danger based on a threat of sand encroachment on historic buildings including the Sidi Yahya Mosque. While the community has kept Sidi Yahya better maintained than the two other main mosques in Timbuktu, years of erosion, wear on the foundation, and ineffective drainage threatened the structure. After adopting and implementing recommendations for protecting its architecture from the organization, Timbuktu was removed from the list in 2005.

== Notable features & Architecture ==
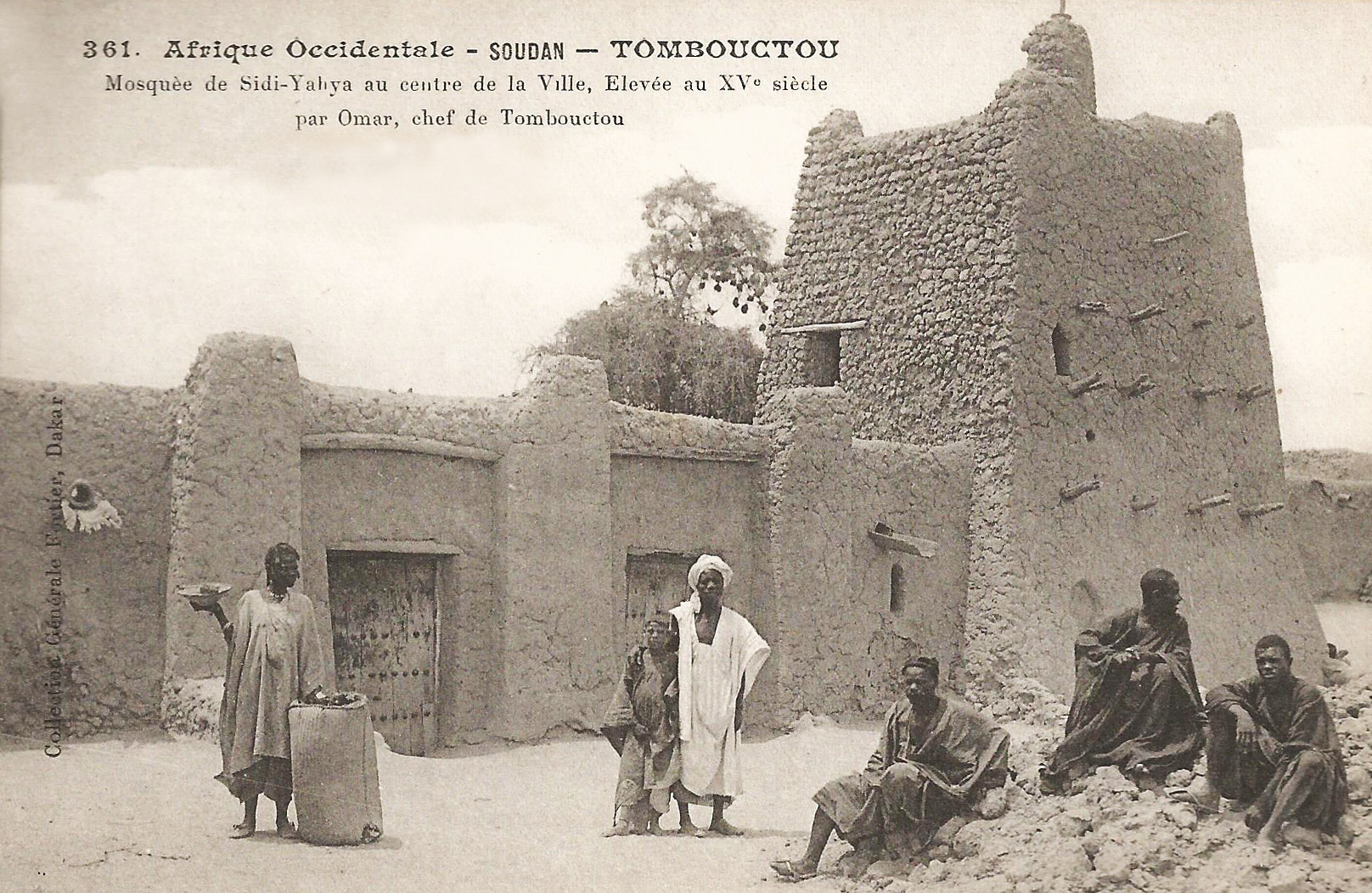
Photo of the Sidi-Yahya mosque in the early 20th century. The mosque was later rebuilt in 1939

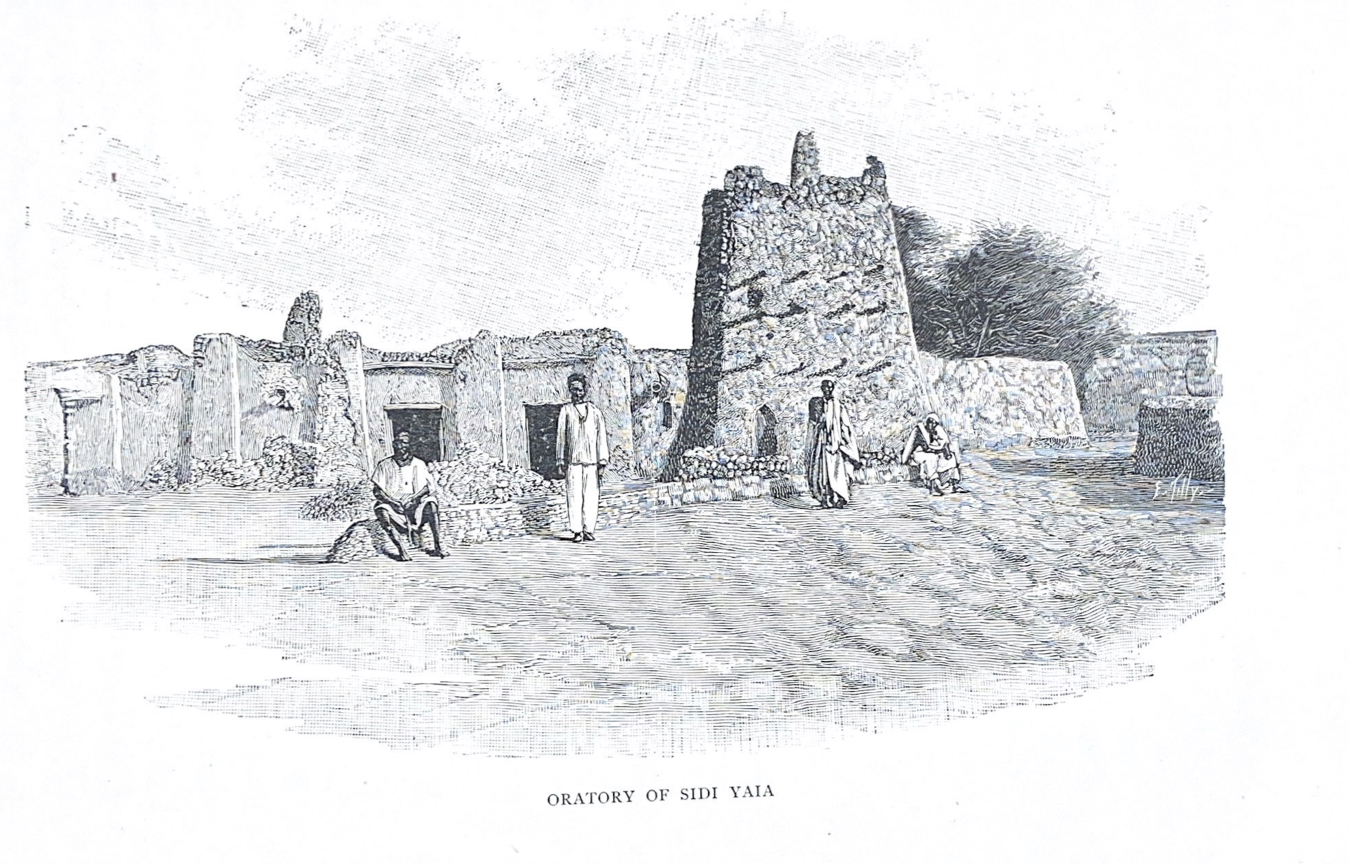
Sketch of the Oratory of Sidi Yahya from Felix Dubois (1896) during his exploration of western Africa.

The architecture of the Sidi Yahya mosque is based on the Sudano-Sahelian style. Sidi Yahya resembles other famous mosques in Timbuktu, such as the Sankore and the Djinguereber mosques. However, key differences distinguish the Sidi Yahya mosque. The doors of the Sidi Yahya mosque are low and ornately designed, showing Moroccan influence from the time when the city was under Maghsharan Tuareg authority (c. 1400–1468). Architecturally, the building contains a covered prayer hall, internal courtyards, wooden doors, and arched openings. A single minaret with pointed arches rises above the mosque and main courtyard but does not reach the height of the two other large mosques in the city. The courtyard was at one point converted into a cemetery that is no longer in use. The imams of the mosque are buried in an underground area north of the building where evening and morning prayers are recited. It also contains lodgings for the mosque's guard. A smaller, external courtyard is used as reading space during the celebration of the birth of Muhammad. The roof of the mosque, like other buildings in Timbuktu, is supported by wood from the indigenous ronnier tree, covered with layers of mud to form the plaster-like exterior. Compared to other mosques of Timbuktu, this one benefits from greater care and maintenance.

According to Prussin Labelle, the Sidi Yahya Mosque's architecture diverges slightly from traditional Islamic architecture's focus on cosmology. Instead of emphasis on divinity and heaven typically expressed through ornament and epigraphy, Sidi Yahya Mosque utilizes clay, mud, and rock to reiterate earthiness and connections to living and dead ancestors whose physical bodies remain buried within the mosque. Permanence and monumentality were the primary objectives in medieval African socio-political structures, and this permanence is thought to be reflected through the earth-based architectural styles used to construct the Sidi Yahya Mosque. The significance of earthworks and earth style architecture reflects the rules of ancestral significance in medieval Africa. Individuals who built the mosque along with other monuments were also grave-diggers and tomb-makers, further incorporating the sacred nature of the Earth and its ancestors into its style.

== Desecration ==
In the summer of 2012, members of Ansar Dine, a group tied to al-Qaeda, broke down the doors of the mosque, which according to legend were not to be opened until the end of time. The Jihadist's justification for the destruction of the city's shrines and mausoleums was that they contradicted the strict interpretation of Islam. Along with the mosque, the tombs embedded within its exterior surface were also desecrated. They claimed that the reverence for the site was idolatrous, as it was said that daily visits to the tomb of Imam Sidi Yahya would provide blessings to believers. The group later offered roughly $100 US dollars to repair the mosque, which was turned down by imam Alpha Abdoulahi. The following year, a suicide bomber from Ansar Dine destroyed windows and a door of the mosque and compromised the stability of its minaret. In 2016, the International Criminal Court found Ahmad al-Faqi al-Mahdi, a participant in the 2012 attacks on the monuments of Timbuktu, guilty of war crimes.

== Restoration ==
In 2013, the restoration of the Sidi Yahya Mosque, viewed by residents of Timbuktu as an historical protective symbol of the city, was carried out by local woodworkers with the support of UNESCO. In January 2013, a reclamation program began with the goal of reconstructing the country's mausoleums, churches, and other monuments that were damaged or destroyed during the 2012 attacks. The restoration of these monuments and restitution of historical manuscripts was pursued by UNESCO and the Government of Mali. The Director-General of UNESCO, Irina Bokova, welcomed the undertaking, stressing the importance of heritage protection for the resilience of communities. “The reinstallation of the sacred gate, a religious and cultural landmark of Timbuktu, marks a new and decisive step in Mali’s reconstruction and peace building work. This—along with the reconstruction of the mausoleums of Timbuktu and the trial of those responsible for their destruction at the International Criminal Court—sends a strong message to all extremists.” With the support of local carpenters and UNESCO, the sacred gate of Sidi Yahya was restored on September 19, 2016. The restoration of the mosque's minaret was completed in 2019.

== See also ==
- Lists of mosques
- List of mosques in Africa
