= Versificator =

Versificator may refer to:

- one who creates verse (poetry)
- Versificator (Nineteen Eighty-Four), a machine in the novel Nineteen Eighty-Four
- Bertsolaritza, the art of singing extemporaneously composed songs in Basque

== See also ==
- Poet Laureate of the United Kingdom
- Versifier (disambiguation)
- Versification (disambiguation)
