= Sankoré Madrasah =

Ancient center of learning in Timbuktu, Mali

Sankore Madrasa
- Médersa de Sankoré
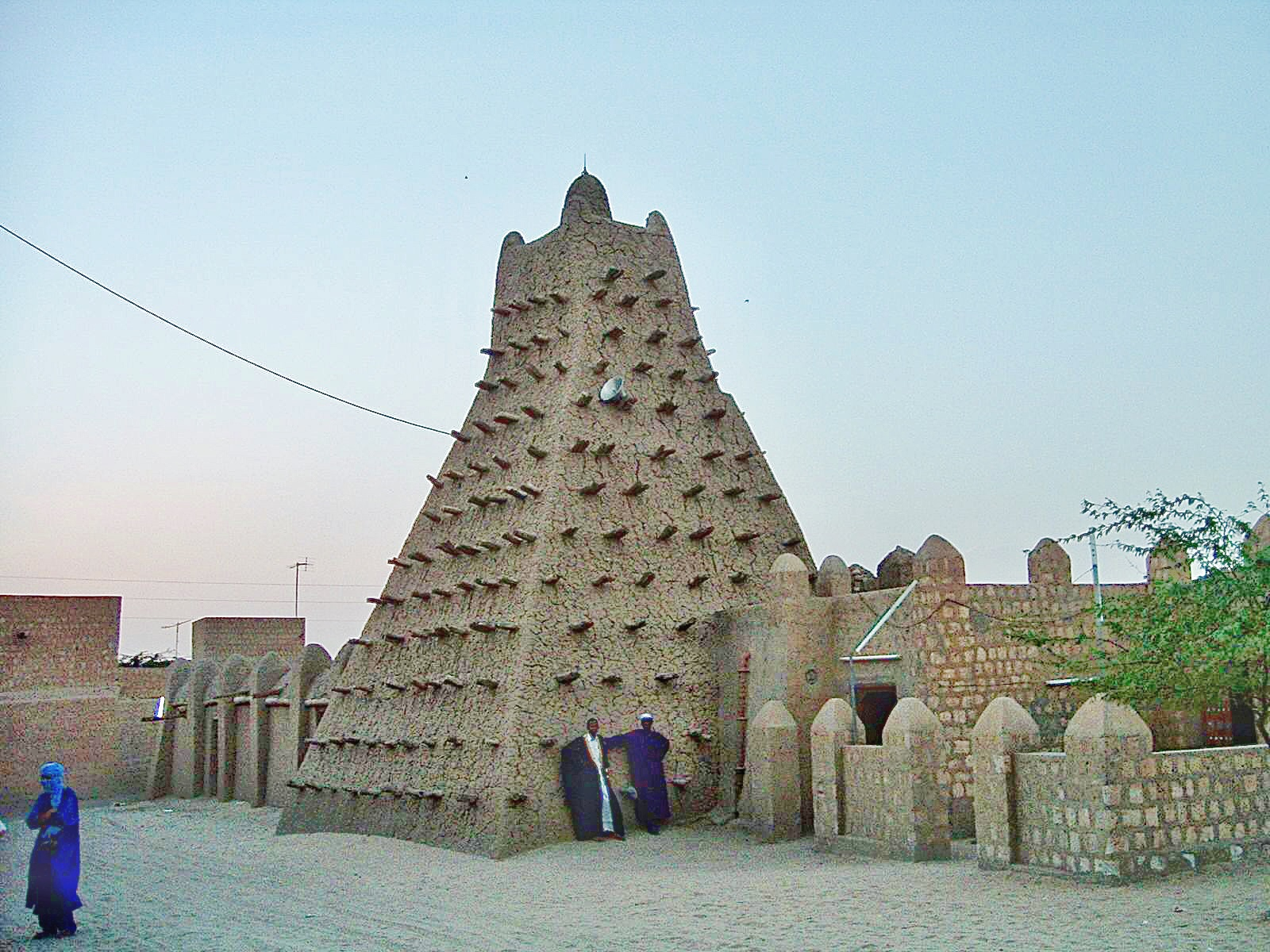
- Sankore Mosque

- Location within Mali

Religion
- Affiliation: Islam

Location
- Location: Timbuktu, Mali
- Coordinates: 16.7758876°N 3.0056351°W

Architecture
- Type: Mosque / Madrasa
- Style: Sudano-Sahelian architecture

Sankoré Madrasa (also called the Sankoré Mosque, Sankoré Masjid, Sankoré Madrasah or University of Sankoré) is one of three medieval mosques and centres of learning located in Timbuktu, Mali. (The others being Djinguereber and Sidi Yahya) Founded in the 14th or early 15th century, the Sankoré mosque went through multiple periods of patronage and renovation under both the Mali Empire and the Songhai Empire until its decline following the Battle of Tondibi in 1591. The mosque developed into an Islamic madrasa.

The term "University of Sankoré" has sometimes been applied to the Sankoré Madrasa, though there is no evidence of a centralized teaching institution such as in European medieval universities. Instead the mosque served as the focal point for individual scholars with their own private students, and as a location in which some lectures and classes were held.

== History ==
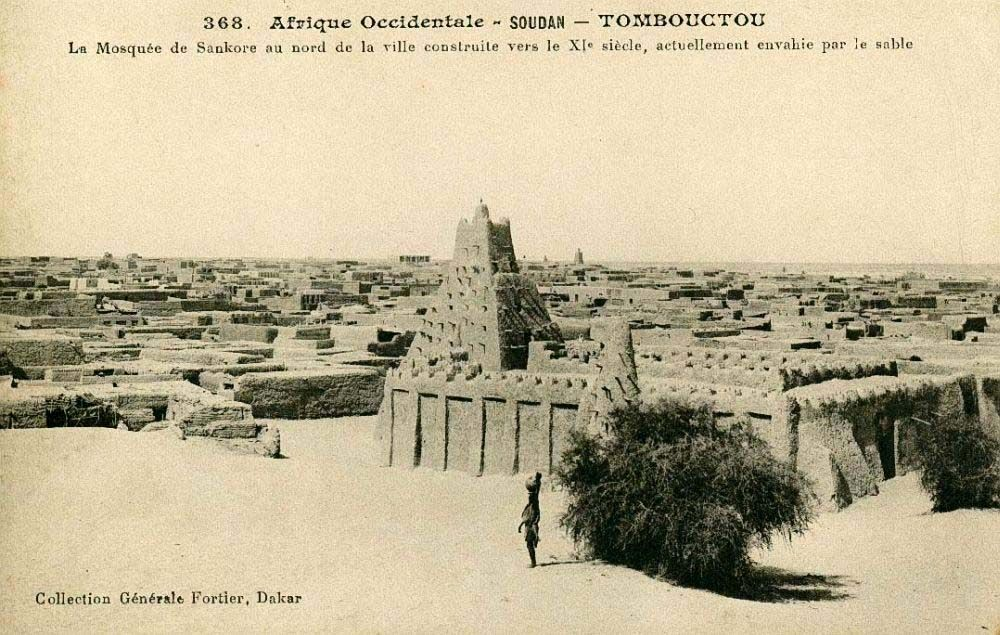
Postcard published by Edmond Fortier with the mosque and surrounding buildings partly buried by sand in 1905–06

The Sankoré mosque was originally built in the 14th-15th centuries with the financial backing of a Tuareg woman of the Aghlal tribe.

The mosque was located in the Sankoré quarter of Timbuktu where most of the town's Berbers and Arabs lived. The name Sankoré means 'white masters' or 'white nobles' in the Songhai language (san-koré, ‘master’-‘white'), the term ‘white’ here referring to the light-skinned Sanhaja Berbers, and corresponding to the Arabic term bidan. According to Octave Houdas and Maurice Delafosse, who translated the Tarikh al-fattash into French, the word Sankoré means "neighborhood of the nobles" or "neighborhood of the lords".

The Sankore Mosque was later restored between 1578 and 1582 AD by Imam Al-Aqib ibn Mahmud ibn Umar, the Chief Qadi (judge) of Timbuktu. Imam al-Aqib demolished the sanctuary and had it rebuilt with the dimensions of the Kaaba in Mecca. The Sankoré Madrasa prospered and became a significant place of learning within the Sudanic Muslim world, especially during the 15th and 16th centuries under Askia dynasty of the Songhai Empire (1493–1591). Sankoré was the mosque that was chiefly associated with teaching in Timbuktu in this period.

=== Growth as a center of learning ===
The Songhai Empire at its greatest extent, c. AD 1500.

Timbuktu developed as a commercial centre in the 14th century as Walata, the previous hub of trans-Saharan trade in the region, began to decline in importance. When Ibn Battuta visited Timbuktu in 1352 he noted that most of the inhabitants belonged to the Massufa tribe of Sanhaja Berbers, but had nothing to say about Islamic learning in the town. A century later, however, the Aqit clan of the Massufa migrated to Timbuktu, bringing with them a deep tradition of learning, especially in Islamic law (fiqh). According to the Tarikh al-Sudan, Islamic scholars and 'holy men' originally from as far as Egypt, Libya, Algeria and Morocco settled in Timbuktu. Scholars associated with the Sankoré mosque accumulated a wealth of books from throughout the Muslim world, leading to Sankoré becoming a centre of learning as well as a centre of worship. At its peak the mosque was the focal point for a class of Islamic scholars that were held in high regard both locally and abroad. Songhai kings would even bestow numerous gifts upon them during Ramadan.

=== Apex and fall ===
The golden age of the Sankoré Madrasa occurred in the 16th century during the Songhai Empire under Askia Muhammad, drawing in scholars from as far as Egypt and Syria. Scholars from Sankoré would also engage in learning or teaching while completing the Hajj to Mecca. The trade in books within the Islamic world was one of the most important aspects of intellectual life in Timbuktu. In 1526 AD the author Leo Africanus noted this trade when he visited Timbuktu, writing: "Here are great store of doctors, judges, priests, and other learned men, that are bountifully maintained at the kings cost and charges. And hither are brought divers manuscripts or written books out of Barbarie, which are sold for more money than any other merchandize." Some Sankoré scholars accumulated large private libraries, with over 1600 manuscripts, though there was no public library or university library in Timbuktu. Manuscripts were copied by local students, giving them a means to earn a living during their studies. Works written in Timbuktu were also exported to North Africa, such as the Nayl al-ibtihaj by Ahmad Baba, a biographical dictionary of Maliki scholars which gained popularity throughout the Maghreb.

In 1591 AD, an invasion by Ahmad al-Mansur of Morocco led to the fall of the Songhai empire following the Battle of Tondibi, starting a long decline of the West African states. In 1594 many Sankoré scholars, including Ahmed Baba, were arrested by Moroccan troops on grounds of sedition and deported to Morocco along with their manuscript collections.

=== Modern day ===
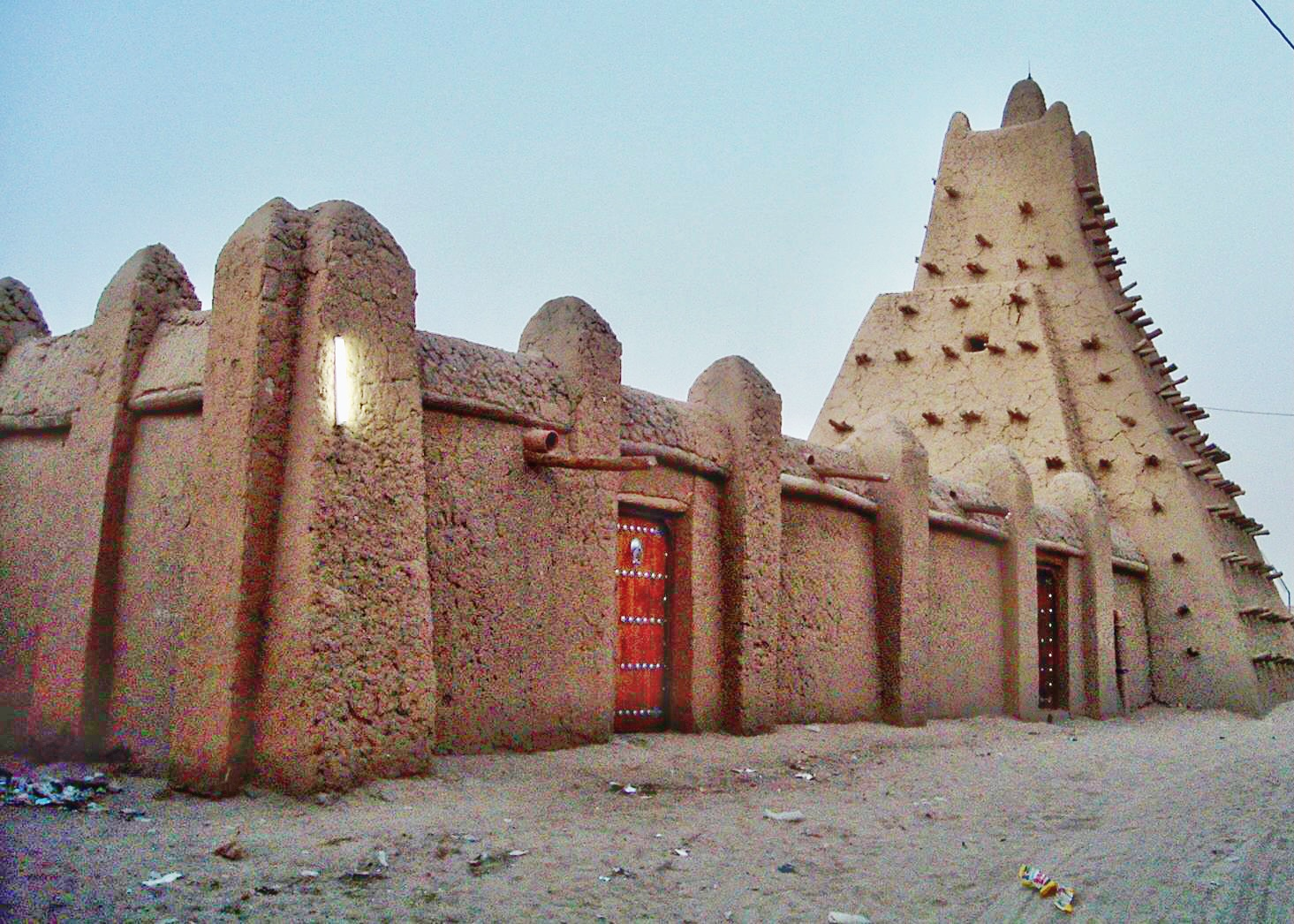
Sankoré mosque, 2007

The integrity of the Sankoré Madrasa has been at risk with increased urbanization and contemporary construction in Timbuktu. Significant damage has been done to the mosque due to flooding and a lack of restoration work. As a result, the integrity of the traditional building is at risk. However, there are currently several restoration and protective committees being funded by the government to prevent further damage. The Management and Conservation Committee of the Old Town, in coordination with the World Heritage Center, held long term plans to create a 500 foot buffer zone to protect the madrasa and create a sustainable urban development framework.

== Organization ==
=== Academic administration ===
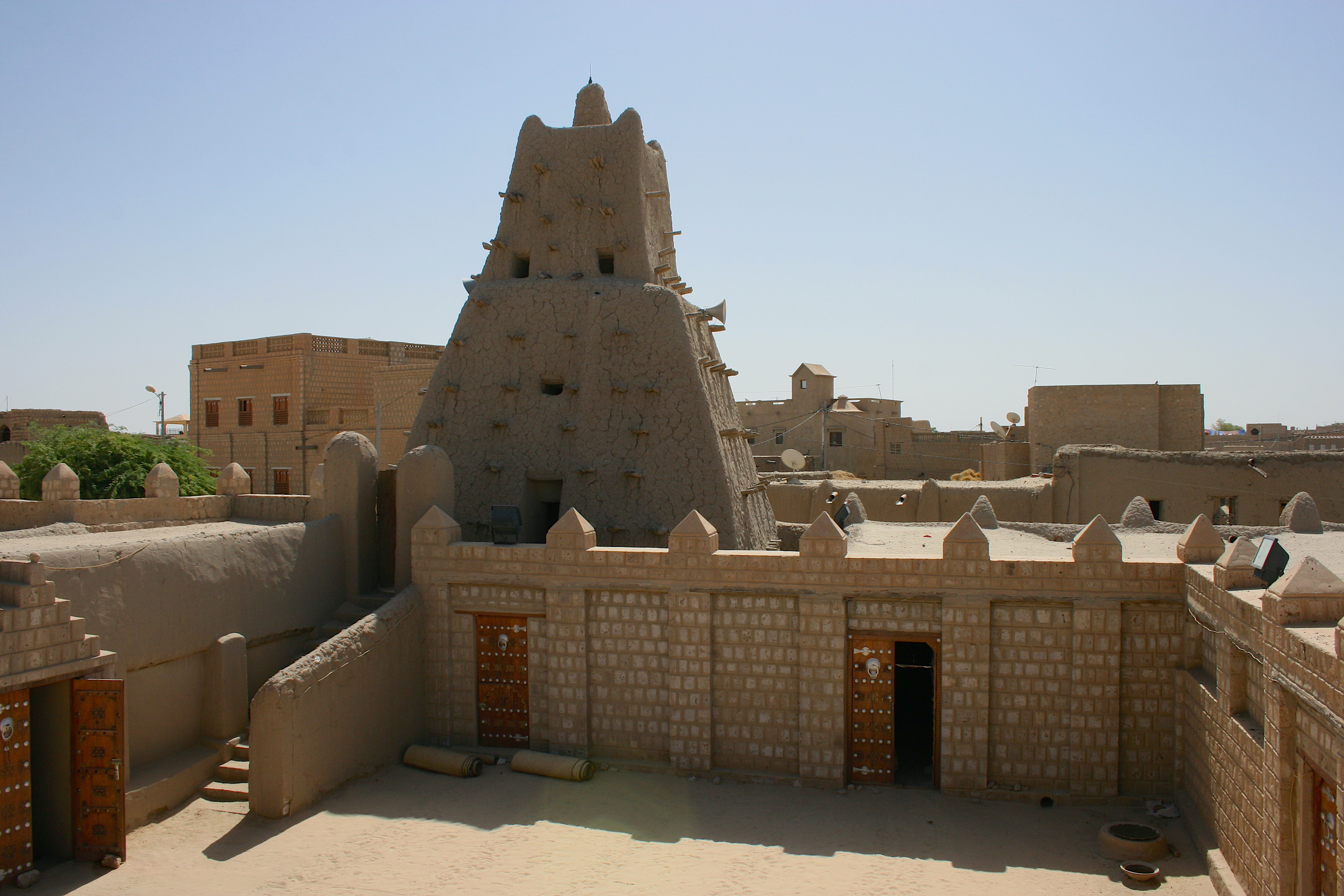
Interior courtyard of the Sankore mosque, renovated in 2014

As the center of an Islamic scholarly community, the madrasa was very different in organization from European medieval universities, where students studied in one institution and were awarded degrees by the college. In contrast, the Sankoré Madrasa had no central administration, student registers, or prescribed course of study. The school instead consisted of individual scholars (known as sheiks or ulama), each with their own private students. Most students learned from a single teacher throughout their entire education, which could last up to 10 years, though some studied under a series of teachers. Classes were held either at the teacher's home or at the mosque. While madrasas in other parts of the Islamic world were often funded through endowments known as waqf (charitable giving), students at the Sankoré Madrasa had to finance their own tuition with money or bartered goods.

=== Architecture ===
The late 16th-century courtyard was reconstructed to exactly match the dimensions of the Kaaba in Mecca, one of Islam's most holy sites. Classes took place in the open courtyard of the mosque, which was made entirely of clay and wood beams. Despite its historical significance the Sankoré mosque was smaller and less intricate than earlier Malian mosques such as the Great Mosque of Djenné.

Modern analyses reject the idea that the Andalusian al-Sahili was responsible for the mosque's construction, demonstrating that the architectural style of the Sankoré Mosque and others in West Africa derives mainly from mosques in the Sahara and from traditional African architecture and religions, so that al-Sahili's influence on West African architecture is treated as a myth. Its Sudano-Sahelian architecture differs stylistically in certain ways from the mosques of North Africa and Andalusia.

== Education ==
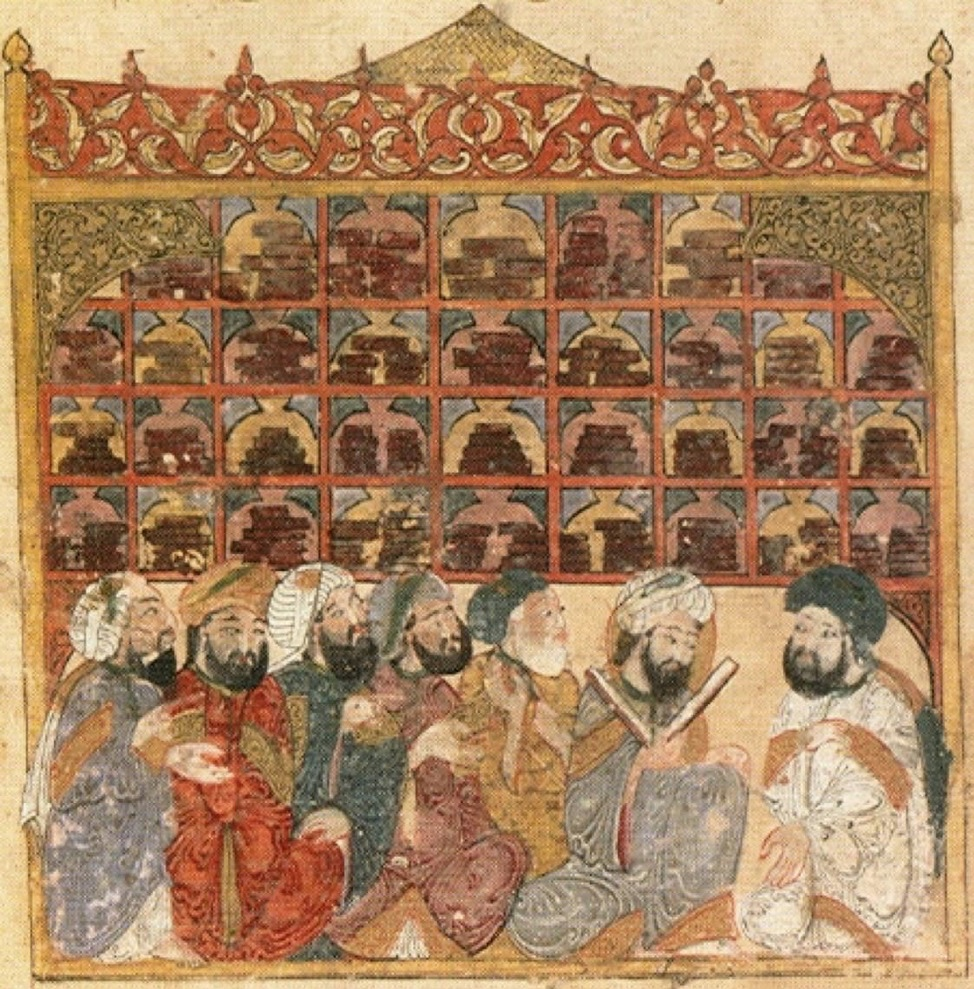
Scholars in the Islamic Golden Age at an Abbasid library in Baghdad, illustration by Yahyá al-Wasiti, 1237

Islamic schooling had existed in West Africa since the 11th century, and although it was usually intended for elites, the Qur’anic emphasis on equality in education allowed for the spread of the institution and increased literacy rates. The Qur'an itself and the hadiths stress the search for knowledge, and Islamic scholarship, especially in the Golden Age of Islam, focused heavily on education. In the 15th century the scholar Al-Kābarī contributed to the development of education in Timbuktu, with a focus on religious teachings. By the 16th century Timbuktu housed as many as 150–180 Qur'anic schools, which taught basic literacy and recitation of the Qur'an to young boys, with an estimated 4,000–9,000 pupils. Around 200–300 individuals drawn from wealthy families were able to pursue higher levels of study and attain the status of ulama (scholars). Some of these became influential jurists, historians and theologians in the wider muslim world.

With the Qur'an being the foundation of all teachings, arguments that could not be backed by the Qur'an were inadmissible in discussions and debates at the Sankoré Madrasa. Madrasas differed from traditional Qur’anic schools in that they focused on Arabic grammar to properly understand holy texts and Islamic scholarship. However, subjects studied at Sankoré also included mathematics (arithmetic), astronomy and history, drawing from the diverse collections of manuscripts held by scholars. Upon reaching the level of a qualified scholar (as judged by their individual teachers), students would receive a turban symbolizing their status.

=== Senior roles ===
The highest level of learning at Sankoré or any masjid was the level of judge or professor. These men worked mainly as judges for the city and throughout the region, dispersing learned men to other cities in Mali. A higher level student who had impressed his Sheik (teacher) enough was admitted into a "circle of knowledge" and valued as a truly learned individual and expert in his field. Those who did not leave Timbuktu remained to teach or counsel the leading people of the region on important legal and religious matters. Scholars would receive questions from the region's kings or governors, and after discussing the issues among themselves, would issue a fatwa on the best way to deal with the problem at hand.

== Scholars ==
Scholars at Sankoré were reputedly of the highest quality, "astounding even the most learned men of Islam", according to Felix Dubois. Some scholars later became teachers at madrasas in Morocco and Egypt. Scholars were sometimes accomplished in multiple disciplines and were employed not only to teach students, but to spread the madrasa's influence to other parts of the Islamic world.

=== Notable scholars ===
Some significant scholars include Abu Abdallah, Ag Mohammed ibn Utman, Ag Mohammed Ibn Al-Mukhtar An-Nawahi. Most came from wealthy and religious families that were members of the Sufi Qadiriyya. The most influential scholar was Ahmad Baba. His life is a brilliant example of the range and depth of intellectual activity in the Sahel before European colonialism. He was the author of over forty books, with nearly each one having a different theme. He was also one of the first citizens to protest the Moroccan conquest of Timbuktu in 1591. Eventually, he, along with his peer scholars, was imprisoned and exiled to Morocco. This led to the loss of his personal collection of 1600 books, which was one of the richest libraries of his day.

=== Religious pilgrimage ===
Apart from their time working in their theoretical studies and the preservation of knowledge, the scholars of Timbuktu were extremely pious. Many embarked on the Hajj, the religious pilgrimage to Mecca, and used this opportunity to hold discussions with scholars from other parts of the Muslim world. On the way home, the scholars showed their humble nature by both learning from other leading scholars in Cairo, and volunteering to teach pupils of other schools in Kano, Katsina, and Walata. Mohammed Bagayogo received an honorary doctorate in Cairo on his holy pilgrimage to Mecca.

== See also ==
- Ancient university
- List of oldest universities in continuous operation
- Medieval university
- Timbuktu Manuscripts Project
- Education in Mali
