= Al-Qadi Aqib ibn Mahmud ibn Umar =

Malian judge and imam (?-1583)

Qadi of Timbuktu
- In office 1565–1583
- Preceded by: Qadi Muhammad ibn Mahmud ibn Umar
- Succeeded by: Qadi Abu Hafs Umar ibn Mahmud ibn Umar

Personal life
- Born: 1507
- Died: 10 August 1583 (aged 75–76)

Religious life
- Religion: Islam

Qadi al-Aqib ibn Mahmud ibn Umar ibn Muhammad Aqit (Arabic: القاضي العقيب بن محمود بن عمر; 1507/1508–1583) was a Sanhaja Berber qadi (supreme Judge) of Timbuktu and Imam of Sankore mosque.

== Life ==
al-Aqib ibn Mahmud was born in 1507/1508 to the Sanhaja Berber Aqit family. He studied under his father and uncle, then went to make the hajj, where he studied under leading scholars like al-Nasir al-Laqani, who certified him to teach a number of books. Ahmad Baba, who was his cousin once removed, studied under him, and got an ijaza. In 1565, al-Aqib succeeded his brother, Qāḍī Muḥammad, as the Qadi of Timbuktu.

In 1569, he began rebuilding Sidi Yahya Mosque, and in 1570 renovating Djinguereber Mosque, followed by the sūq mosque in 1577/1578. He rebuilt the Sankore mosque the following year, for which he precisely adopted the Qibla.

He died on 10 August 1583 and was succeeded as Qadi by his brother Abu Hafs Umar.

== See also ==
- Sankore Madrasah
- Djinguereber Mosque
- Mali Empire
