= Ahmad Baba (crater) =

Crater on Mercury

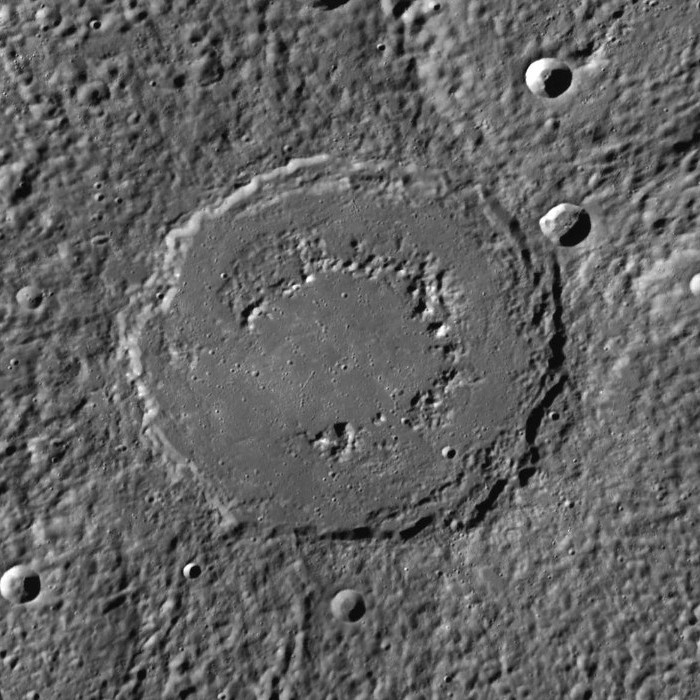
- MESSENGER WAC mosaic of Ahmed Baba
- Feature type: Peak-ring impact basin
- Location: Beethoven quadrangle, Mercury
- Coordinates: 17.4°N 126.8°W
- Diameter: 127 km (79 mi)
- Eponym: Ahmad Baba al Massufi

Ahmad Baba is a crater on Mercury. It has a diameter of 127 kilometers. Its name was adopted by the International Astronomical Union (IAU) in 1979.

Ahmad Baba is one of 110 peak ring basins on Mercury. Hollows are present within the crater.

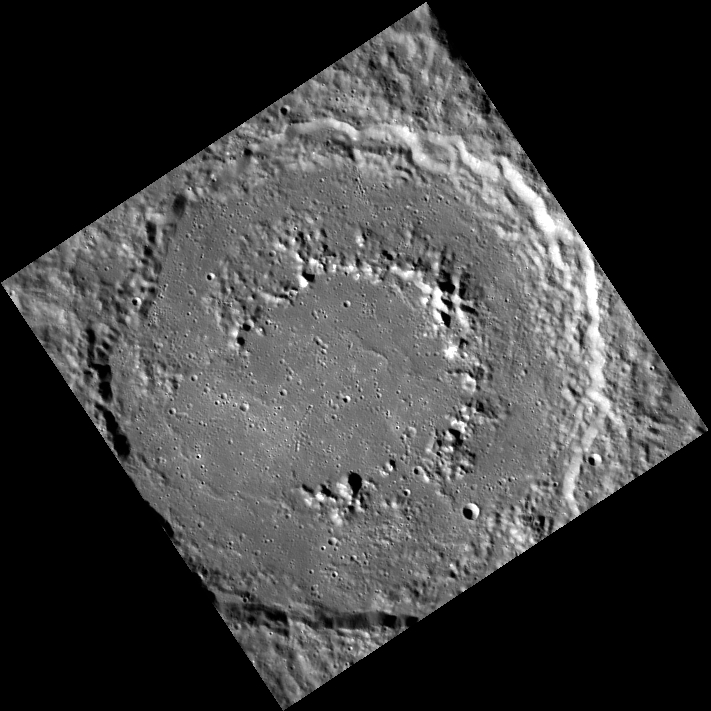
Another MESSENGER image, with illumination opposite that of the image in the infobox

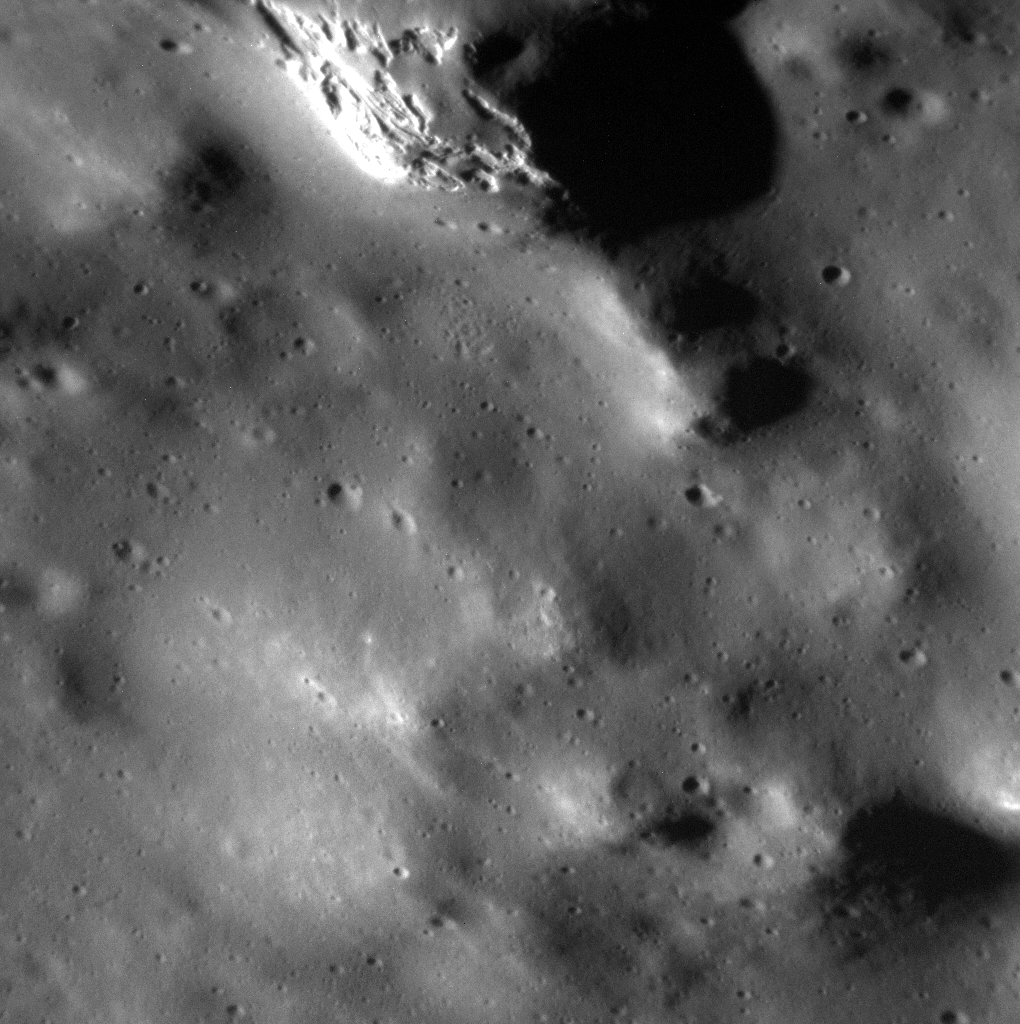
Hollows located on the south-facing slope of Ahmad Baba's peak ring
