= Versification =

Versification may refer to:

- the art of making poetry
  - Metre (poetry), the basic rhythmic structure of a verse or lines in verse
  - Verse (poetry), a single metrical line in a poetic composition
- Versification (Bible), process by which the books of the Bible were divided into verses

== See also ==
- Versifier (disambiguation)
- Versificator (disambiguation)
