= Versifier =

Versifier may refer to:

- one who creates verse
- Poetaster, a derogatory term applied to bad or inferior poets

== See also ==
- Versification (disambiguation)
- Poet Laureate of the United Kingdom
