= Quran boards =

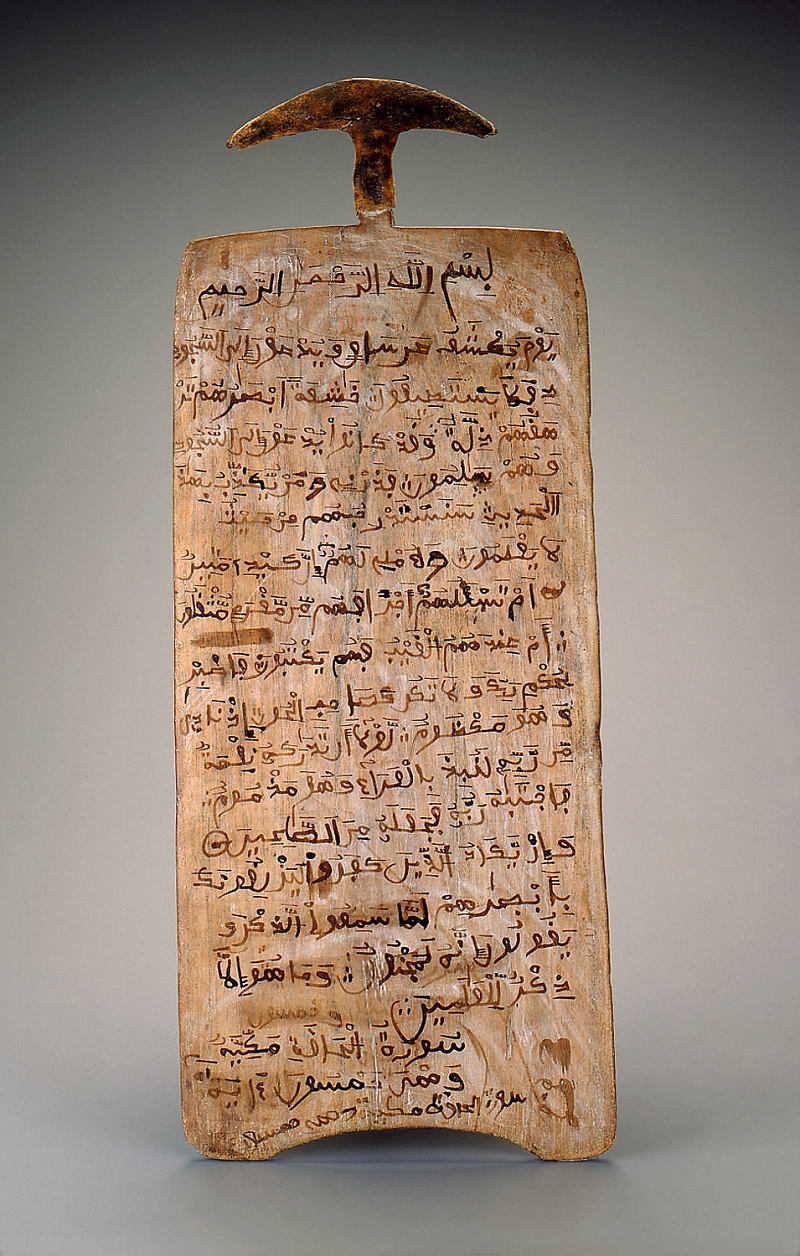
Quranic Writing Board made in the mid-late 20th century, residing in the National Museum of African Art

Quran boards (Arabic: لوح, romanized: lawḥ, lit. 'board', plural: ألواح, alwāḥ) are wooden boards or tablets that are historically and contemporarily used by students in sub-Saharan Africa, especially West Africa, to learn the Quran. In addition to being used as educational tools, these boards bear greater religious and cultural significance, as they are also used in spiritual and healing rituals.

== Construction and design ==
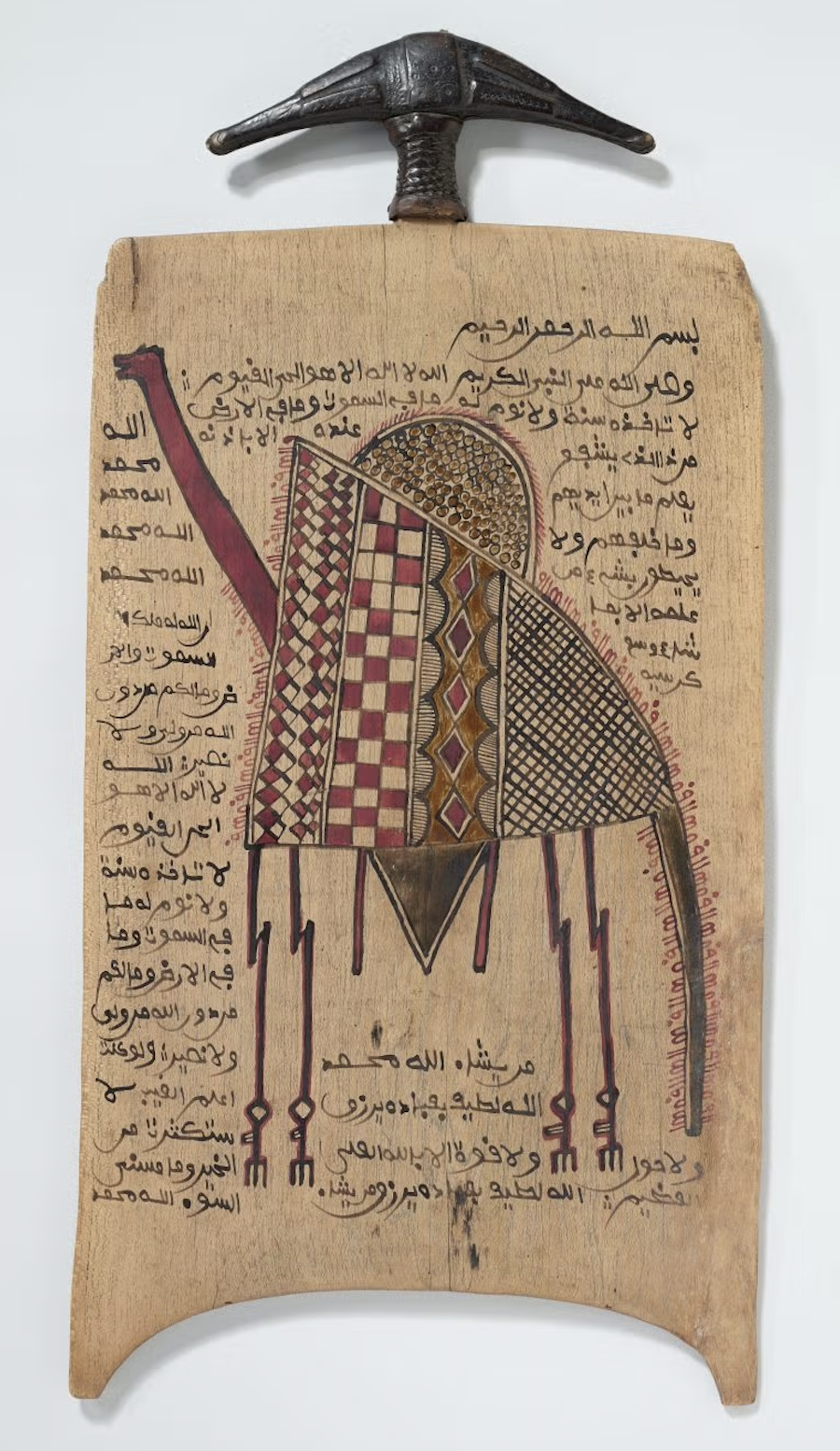
Quranic slate with geometric camel illustration. H 26.5″. Hausa artist, Nigeria, late 20th century. Minneapolis Institute of Art.

Quran boards are made from locally available woods, such as mahogany or baobab. Inks used on the writing boards are typically made from natural pigments that are mixed with charcoal and water. In some cases different inks may also include ingredients that are said to be spiritually important, like saffron. Some boards have decorative details, like patterns, borders, illumination, or calligraphy.

Quran boards are a cultural link between written Islamic tradition and broader African material culture. Quran boards have been found to be visually similar to Islamic manuscripts, which feature distinct regional calligraphy and materials. The designs reflect Islamic manuscript illumination in Islamic West African cultures and include elements such as geometric borders and intricate interlacing patterns and red and black ink.

== Educational use ==
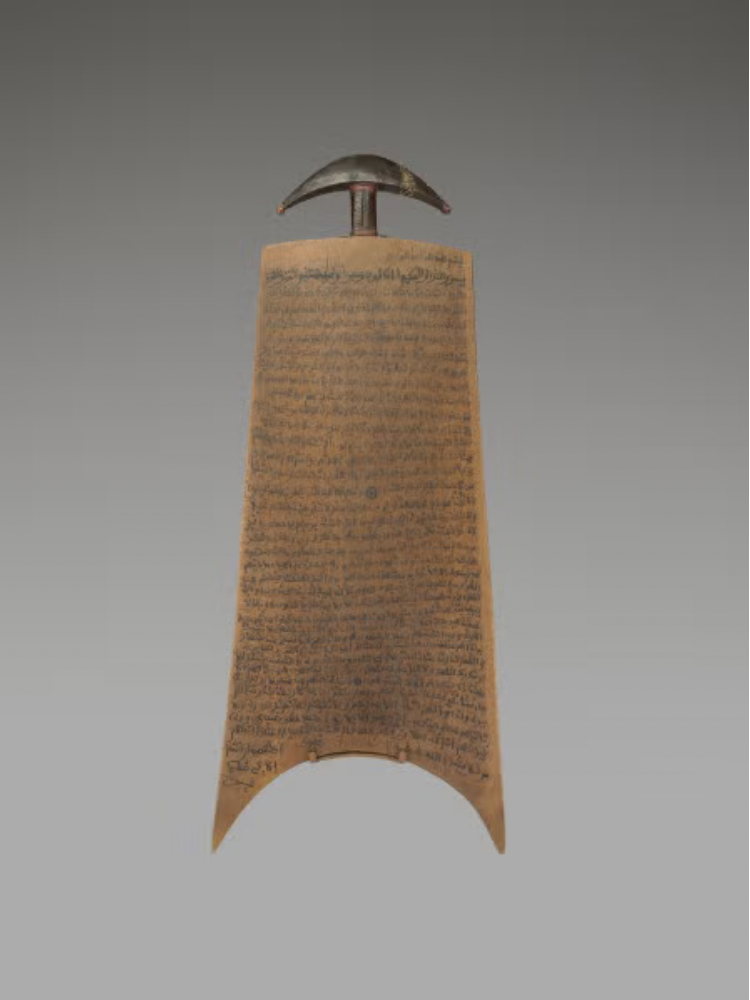
Quran board made in Nigeria in the late 19th or early 20th century by a Hausa artist.

Quran boards are used in Islamic education in West Africa (in schools, or madrasas) for learning the Quran. Students (called 'talibes') repeatedly copy verses from the Quran on the boards to facilitate their memorization (hifz) and spiritual understanding of the sacred text, but doing so also supports literacy generally.

Quran boards have been used for centuries in West African Quranic schools and remain integral despite the introduction of colonial-era education systems that favor blackboards and westernized classrooms.

== Religious and spiritual use ==
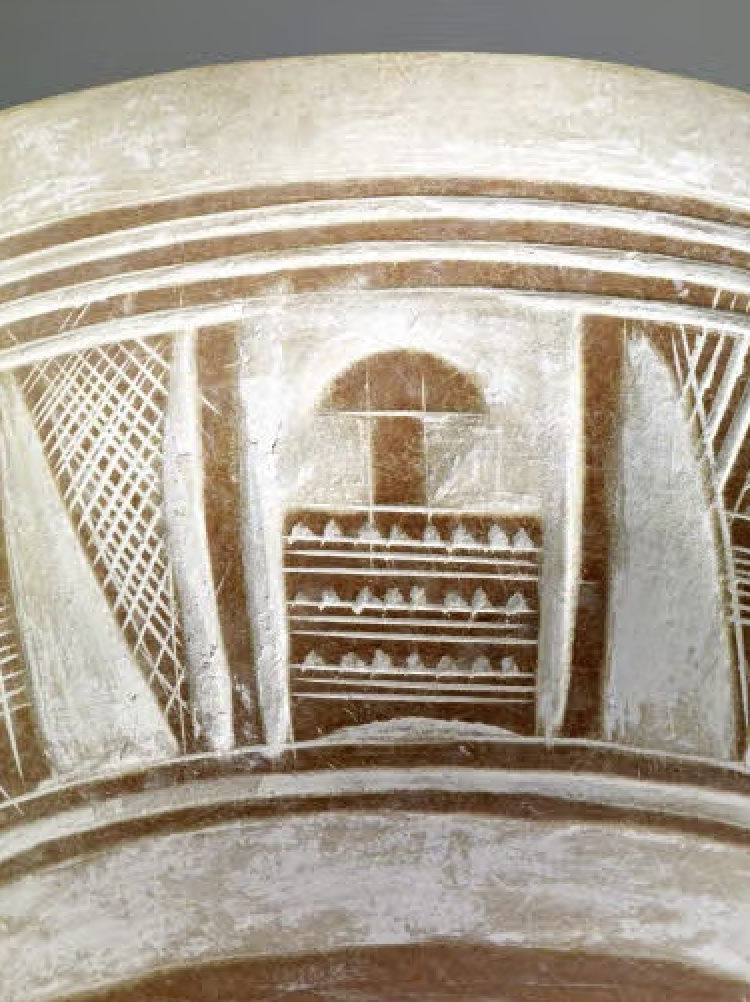
Detail of a Quran board on a milk transport calabash. Fulani artist, Bamenda, Cameroon, before 1972.

As objects of both devotion and education, Quran boards are not only important for their educational function, but they also are used for spiritual healing and similar ritual purposes.

In some cases, spiritual practitioners inscribe Quranic verses or diagrams on the boards for clients seeking protection from illness, misfortune, or the evil eye. Once a verse or chapter has been mastered, the writing on the board is then washed off and the water collected. It is believed that the water is then imbued with the sacred scripture through the ink itself. The water is then consumed or used in healing rituals.

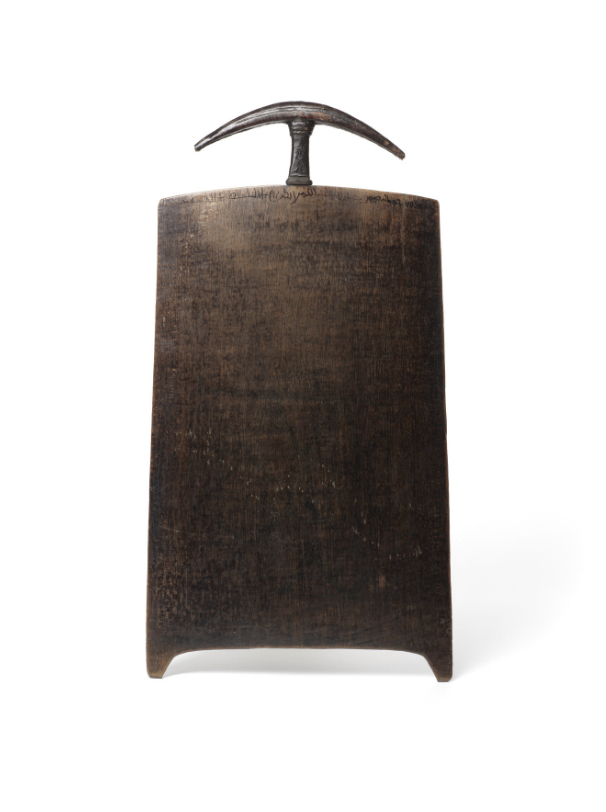
19th-century Quran board in the Walters Art Museum collection, acc. no. 61.347.

The belief is that by imbuing the water with the word of God it can offer protection, wisdom, or physical healing. This practice is based on the belief that the written word itself carries divine power. The symbolic power of sacred writing in African Islamic traditions, especially in the form of amulets and writing boards used for both religious education and spiritual protection.

Lawḥ boards are part of a broader tradition of Islamic manuscript preservation in Africa and are often misunderstood or undervalued in academic and museum contexts.

== Museum collections and artistic references ==
Institutions such as the British Museum, the Smithsonian National Museum of African Art, and the Musée du Quai Branly in Paris now all have Quran boards in their collections.

The imagery of Quran boards are also found in various pieces of contemporary art. This can be seen in the pieces By His Will We Teach the Birds How to Fly by Ibrahim El-Salahi and a detail of a Quranic slate on a milk transport calabash by a Fulani artist.
