= Djinguereber Mosque =

Learning center in Timbuktu, Mali

- مسجد جينجيربر; Mosquée de Djinguereber
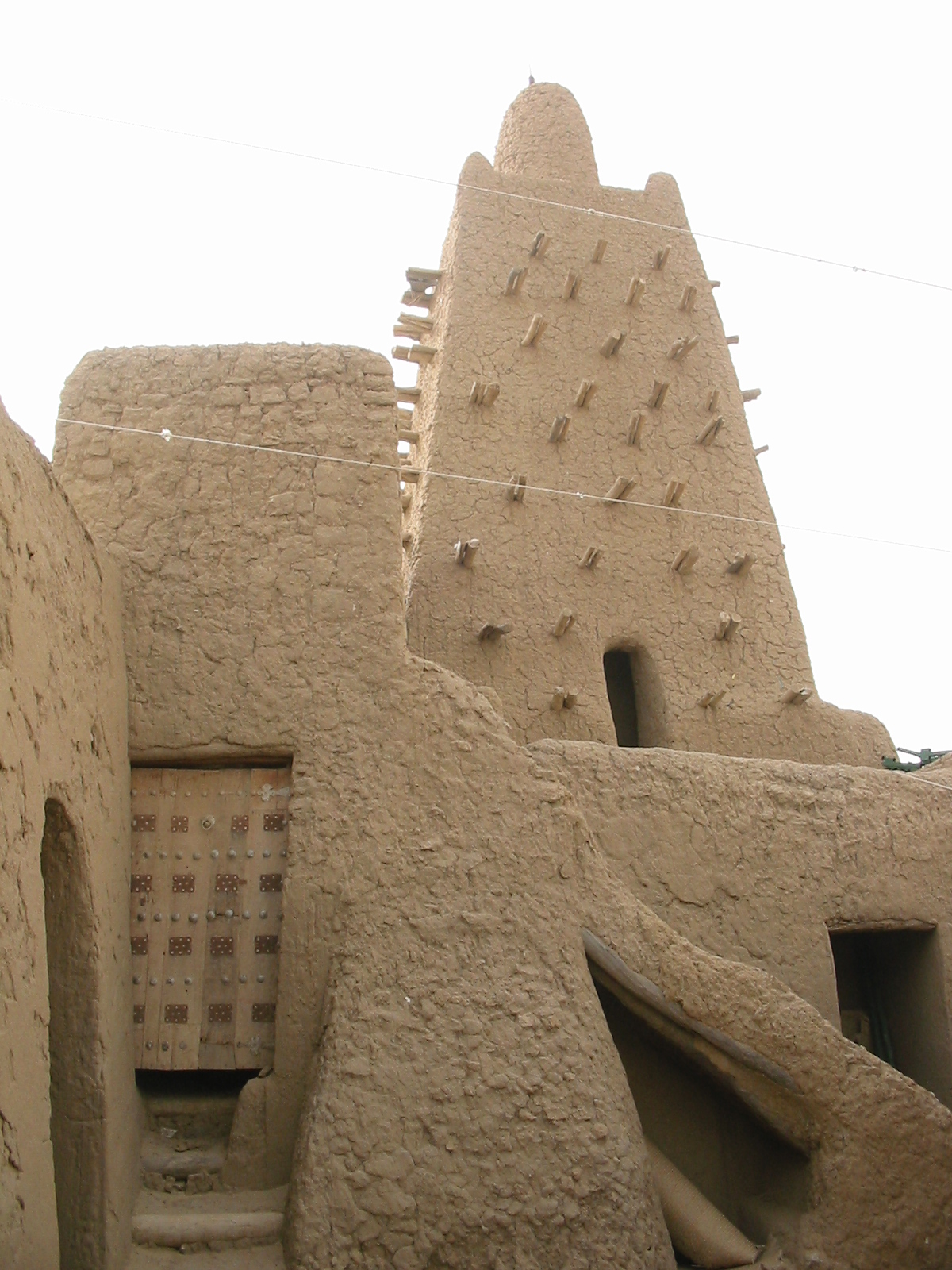

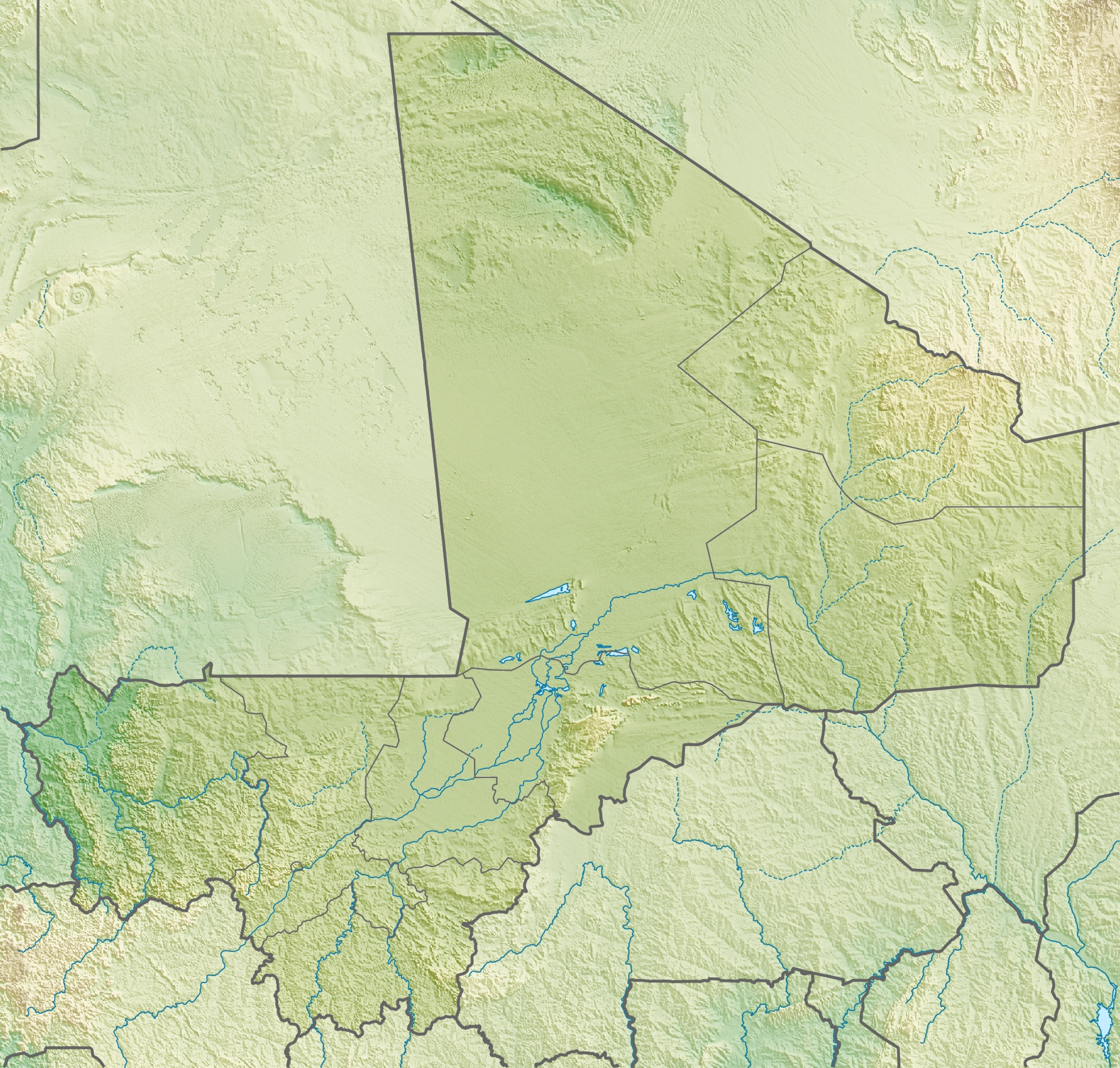
- Location within Mali

Religion
- Affiliation: Islam
- Branch/tradition: Sunni

Location
- Location: Timbuktu, Mali
- Coordinates: 16°46′17″N 3°0′36″W

Architecture
- Type: mosque
- Completed: 1327

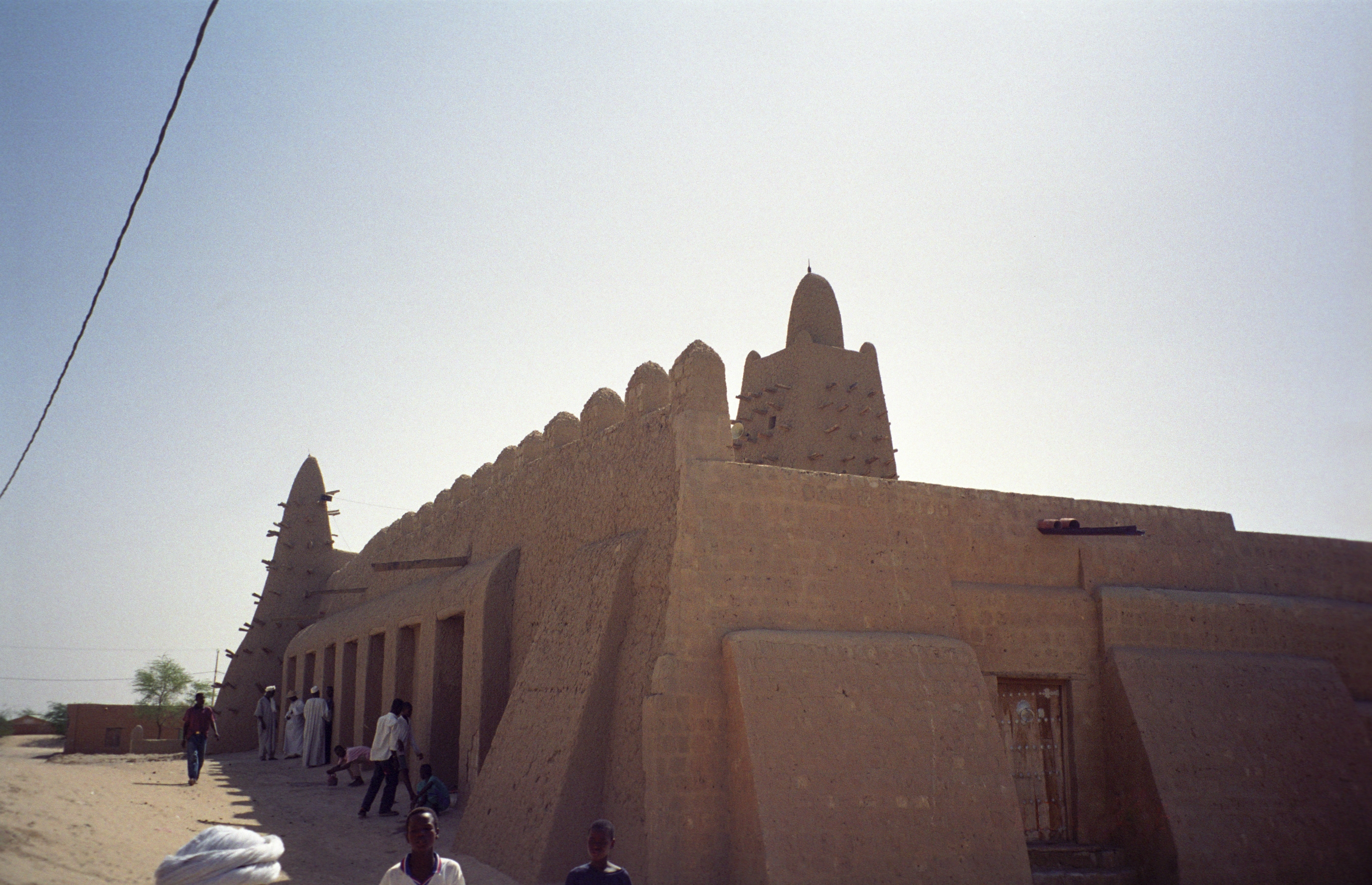
Outside the mosque

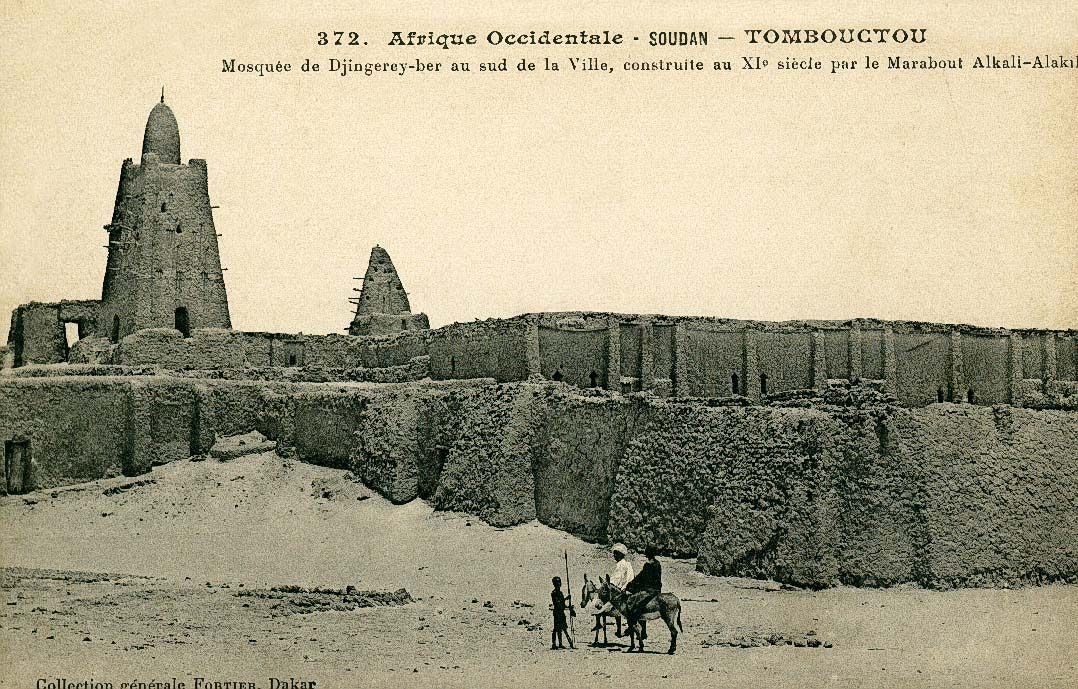
Postcard published by Edmond Fortier showing the mosque in 1905-1906

The Djinguereber Mosque (Arabic: مسجد دجينجيربر; French: Mosquée de Djinguereber; from Koyra Chiini jiŋgar-ey beer 'grand mosque'), also known as Djingareyber or Djingarey Ber, is a famous learning center in Timbuktu, Mali. Built in 1327, it is one of three mosques associated with the historical community of scholars and students known today as the "University of Timbuktu". It was inscribed on the list of UNESCO World Heritage Sites in 1988.

== Design ==
The design and construction of the Djinguereber mosque is traditionally credited to the Andalusi scholar Abu Ishaq Al Sahili. According to Ibn Khaldun, one of the best-known sources on 14th-century Mali, he was said to have received 12,000 mithkals of gold dust for the work. More recent analyses reject this version, demonstrating that the architectural style of the Djinguereber Mosque and others in West Africa derives mainly from mosques in the Sahara and traditional African architecture and religions, so that al-Sahili's influence on West African architecture is treated as a myth.

Except for a small part of the northern facade, which was reinforced in the 1960s in alhore (limestone blocks, also widely used in the rest of the town), and the minaret, also built in limestone and rendered with mud, the Djingareyber Mosque is made entirely of earth plus organic materials such as fibre, straw and wood. It has three inner courts, two minarets and twenty-five rows of pillars aligned in an east-west direction and a prayer space for 2,000 people.

== History ==
=== Foundation of the mosque ===
The creation of Djinguereber mosque is attributed to Mansa Musa in 1325. Its Sudano-Sahelian architecture differs stylistically from the mosques of North Africa and Andalusia. The mosque is sometimes credited to the Granadan poet Abū Isḥāq al-Sāḥilī, whom Mansa Musa brought to Mali after the 1324 hajj, but J. O. Hunwick has shown that al-Sāḥilī is firmly attested in the Arabic sources only as the designer of a royal audience chamber at the city of Mali, and that his role there appears to have been organisational rather than that of a structural architect.

=== Medieval period ===
During the reign of Askia Dawud of the Songhai Empire, Djinguereber mosque was renovated by the Qadi of Timbuktu Aqib ibn Mahmud beginning in 1570. The work was a source of conflict between the Askia and the Qadi, who resented the renovated mosque's association with a secular power.

=== Post-independence ===
On 26 February 2010, during Mawlid (a festival to mark the birth anniversary of Muhammad), a stampede at the mosque killed around 26 people and injured at least 55 others, mostly women and children.

=== Attack in 2012 ===
On 1 July 2012, militant Islamists of the Ansar Dine ("defenders of faith") began destroying the tombs of Timbuktu shortly after UNESCO placed them on a list of endangered World Heritage sites. They set about destroying seven of Timbuktu's total sixteen ancient Muslim saint shrines, including two tombs at the Djingareyber Mosque. Using "hoes, pick-axes and chisels, they hammered away at the two earthen tombs until they were completely destroyed". The damage to the mosque itself, however, was minimal.

== Preservation efforts ==
The mosque was on the UN's list of World Heritage Sites in danger in 1990 due to sand encroachment from increasing desertification. A four-year project towards the restoration and rehabilitation of the Mosque began in June 2006, and is being conducted and financed by the Aga Khan Trust for Culture.

The first phase of restoration was a pilot project undertaken from November 2006 to July 2007. This work included drainage and paving around the mosque, re-rendering walls in bad condition and in one zone of the roof, replacing around 50% of the beams, above which was a heavy build-up of mud plaster. The local masons in charge of the project clearly had good technical expertise; however, there is a need to regularly document their activities and starting point. Natural local trees that were originally used for building materials for the beams in the mosque have also disappeared due to climate change, so wood beams must be imported from Ghana. This drastically increases the price of resources needed to restore the mosque, as building materials are not readily available. Despite ongoing maintenance efforts, there is still a one-meter difference between the roof height in 1952 and today.

While drought may cause issues, too much rain has also shown to be detrimental to the mosque. Heavy rains in 1999, 2001 and 2003 caused the collapse of many traditionally built earthen buildings, as well as more recently built structures. Climate change is expected to increase the severity of these threats.

After being de-listed in 2005, the Djinguereber has once again been on the list of World Heritage Sites in danger since the attack by Ansar Dine in 2012.

== 3D model with laser-scanning ==
The Zamani Project documents cultural heritage sites in 3D to create a record for future generations. The documentation of the Djinguereber Mosque is based on terrestrial laser-scanning. The 3D documentation of the Djinguereber Mosque was carried out in 2005. A 3D model, plans and images can be viewed here.

== See also ==
- Lists of mosques
- List of mosques in Africa
