= Outline of Mozambique =

Overview of and topical guide to Mozambique

The Flag of Mozambique

The Coat of arms of Mozambique

The location of Mozambique

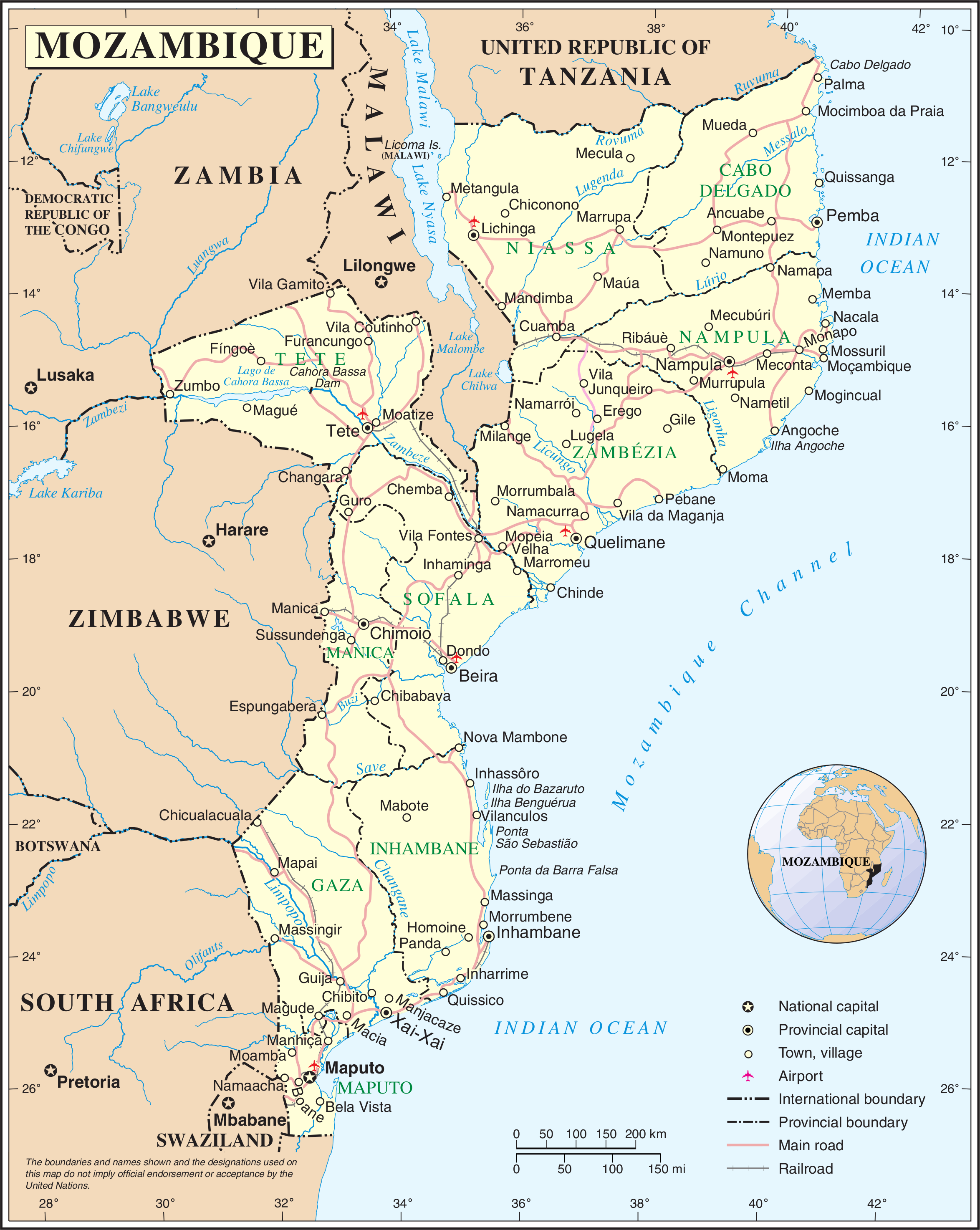
An enlargeable map of Mozambique

The following outline is provided as an overview of and topical guide to Mozambique:

Mozambique – sovereign country located in southeastern Africa bordered by the Indian Ocean to the east, Tanzania to the north, Malawi and Zambia to the northwest, Zimbabwe to the west and Eswatini and South Africa to the southwest. Mozambique was explored by Vasco da Gama in 1498 and colonized by Portugal in 1505. By 1510, the Portuguese had control of all of the former Arab sultanates on the east African coast. From about 1500, Portuguese trading posts and forts became regular ports of call on the new route to the east.

It is a member of the Community of Portuguese Language Countries and the Commonwealth of Nations. Mozambique (Moçambique) was named after Muça Alebique, a sultan.

== General reference ==
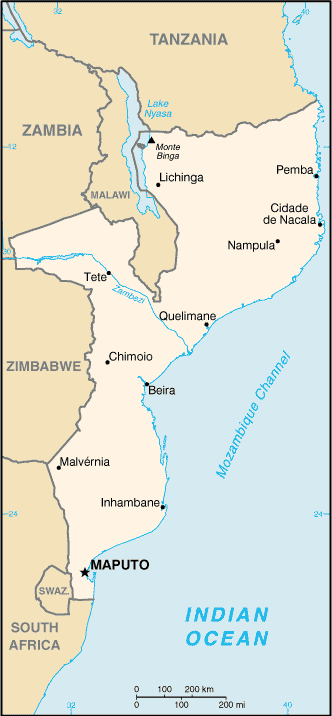
An enlargeable basic map of Mozambique

- Pronunciation: /moʊzæmˈbiːk/
- Common English country name: Mozambique
- Official English country name: The Republic of Mozambique
- Common endonym(s):
- Official endonym(s):
- Adjectival(s): Mozambican
- Demonym(s): Mozambican(s)
- International rankings of Mozambique
- ISO country codes: MZ, MOZ, 508
- ISO region codes: See ISO 3166-2:MZ
- Internet country code top-level domain: .mz

== Geography ==
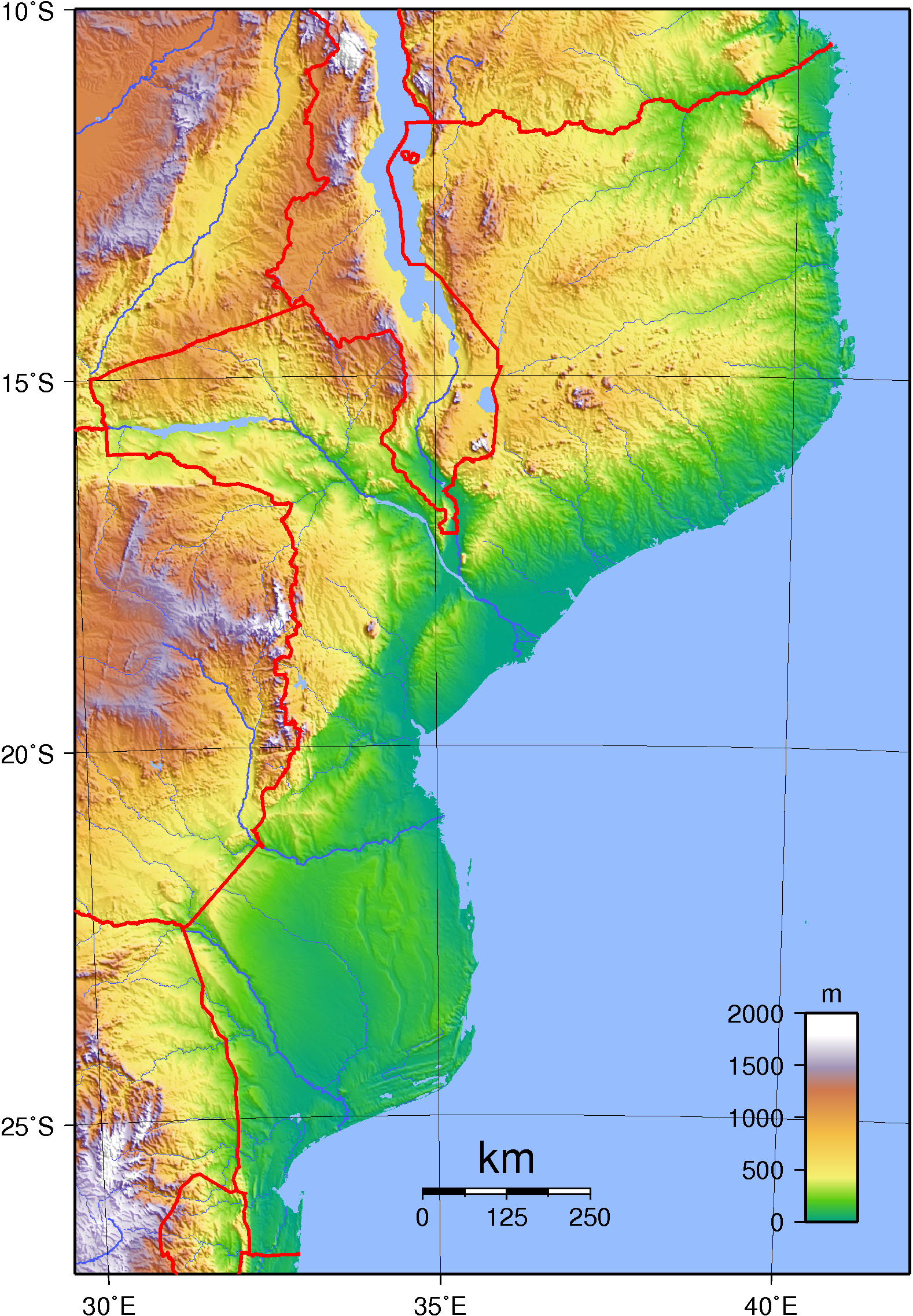
An enlargeable topographic map of Mozambique

Geography of Mozambique

- Mozambique is: a country
- Location:
  - Eastern Hemisphere and Southern Hemisphere
  - Africa
    - East Africa
    - Southern Africa
  - Time zone: Central Africa Time (UTC+02)
  - Extreme points of Mozambique
    - High: Monte Binga 2,436 m (7,992 ft)
    - Low: Mozambique Channel 0 m
  - Land boundaries: 4,571 km

Malawi 1,569 km
Zimbabwe 1,231 km
Tanzania 756 km
South Africa 491 km
Zambia 419 km
Eswatini 105 km

- Coastline: 2,470 km

- Population of Mozambique: 21,397,000 – 45th most populous country
- Area of Mozambique: 801,590 km^{2}
- Atlas of Mozambique

=== Environment ===
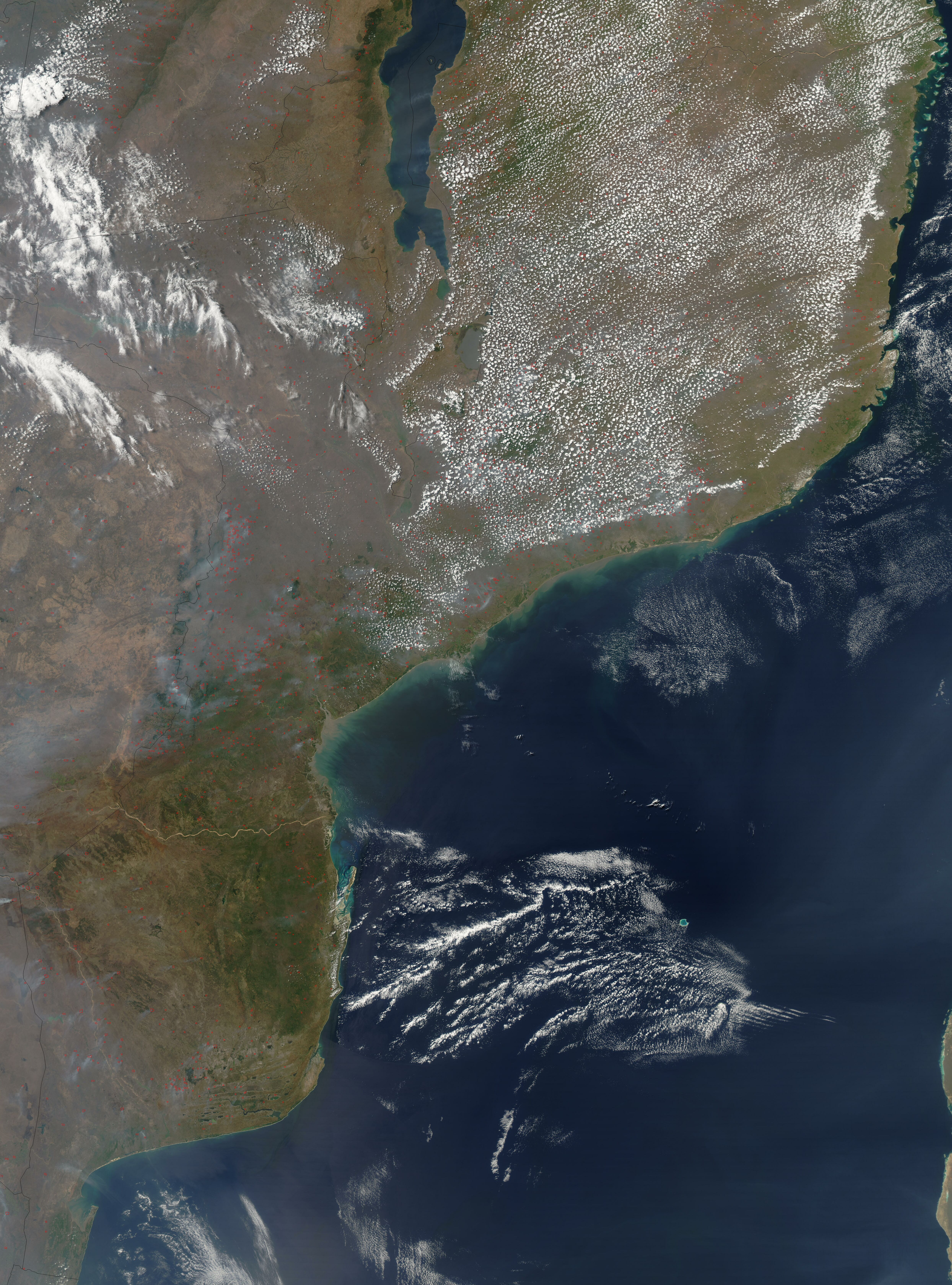
An enlargeable satellite image of Mozambique

- Climate of Mozambique
- Ecoregions in Mozambique
- Protected areas of Mozambique
  - National parks of Mozambique
- Wildlife of Mozambique
  - Fauna of Mozambique
    - Birds of Mozambique
    - Mammals of Mozambique
    - List of non-marine molluscs of Mozambique, List of marine molluscs of Mozambique

==== Natural geographic features ====
- Glaciers in Mozambique: none
- Rivers of Mozambique
- World Heritage Sites in Mozambique

==== Ecoregions ====
List of ecoregions in Mozambique

- Ecoregions in Mozambique

==== Administrative divisions ====
Administrative divisions of Mozambique

- Provinces of Mozambique
  - Districts of Mozambique
    - Postos of Mozambique
- Capital of Mozambique: Maputo
- Cities of Mozambique

=== Demography ===
Demographics of Mozambique

== Government and politics ==
Politics of Mozambique

- Form of government: unitary semi-presidential representative democratic republic
- Capital of Mozambique: Maputo
- Elections in Mozambique
- Political parties in Mozambique

=== Branches of the government ===
Government of Mozambique

==== Executive branch of the government ====
- Head of state and head of government: President of Mozambique, Daniel Chapo
- Cabinet of Mozambique
  - Prime Minister of Mozambique, Maria Benvinda Levy

==== Legislative branch of the government ====
- Parliament of Mozambique: Assembly of the Republic (unicameral)

==== Judicial branch of the government ====
Judicial branch of Mozambique

=== Foreign relations ===
Foreign relations of Mozambique

- Diplomatic missions in Mozambique
- Diplomatic missions of Mozambique

==== International organization membership ====
The Republic of Mozambique is a member of:

- African, Caribbean, and Pacific Group of States (ACP)
- African Development Bank Group (AfDB)
- African Union (AU)
- Commonwealth of Nations
- Community of Portuguese Language Countries (CPLP)
- Food and Agriculture Organization (FAO)
- Group of 77 (G77)
- International Atomic Energy Agency (IAEA)
- International Bank for Reconstruction and Development (IBRD)
- International Civil Aviation Organization (ICAO)
- International Criminal Court (ICCt) (signatory)
- International Criminal Police Organization (Interpol)
- International Development Association (IDA)
- International Federation of Red Cross and Red Crescent Societies (IFRCS)
- International Finance Corporation (IFC)
- International Fund for Agricultural Development (IFAD)
- International Hydrographic Organization (IHO)
- International Labour Organization (ILO)
- International Maritime Organization (IMO)
- International Mobile Satellite Organization (IMSO)
- International Monetary Fund (IMF)
- International Olympic Committee (IOC)
- International Organization for Migration (IOM) (observer)
- International Organization for Standardization (ISO) (correspondent)
- International Red Cross and Red Crescent Movement (ICRM)
- International Telecommunication Union (ITU)
- International Telecommunications Satellite Organization (ITSO)
- International Trade Union Confederation (ITUC)
- Inter-Parliamentary Union (IPU)
- Islamic Development Bank (IDB)
- Multilateral Investment Guarantee Agency (MIGA)
- Nonaligned Movement (NAM)
- Organisation internationale de la Francophonie (OIF) (observer)
- Organisation of Islamic Cooperation (OIC)
- Organisation for the Prohibition of Chemical Weapons (OPCW)
- Southern African Development Community (SADC)
- União Latina
- United Nations (UN)
- United Nations Conference on Trade and Development (UNCTAD)
- United Nations Educational, Scientific, and Cultural Organization (UNESCO)
- United Nations High Commissioner for Refugees (UNHCR)
- United Nations Industrial Development Organization (UNIDO)
- United Nations Mission in the Sudan (UNMIS)
- United Nations Organization Mission in the Democratic Republic of the Congo (MONUC)
- Universal Postal Union (UPU)
- World Customs Organization (WCO)
- World Federation of Trade Unions (WFTU)
- World Health Organization (WHO)
- World Intellectual Property Organization (WIPO)
- World Meteorological Organization (WMO)
- World Tourism Organization (UNWTO)
- World Trade Organization (WTO)

=== Law and order ===
Law of Mozambique

- Constitution of Mozambique
- Human rights in Mozambique
  - LGBT rights in Mozambique
- Mozambique Republic Police

=== Military ===
Military of Mozambique

- Command
  - Commander-in-chief: Presidents of Mozambique
- Forces
  - Army of Mozambique
  - Air Force of Mozambique

=== Local government ===
Local government in Mozambique

== History ==
History of Mozambique

- Current events of Mozambique

== Culture ==
Culture of Mozambique

- Cuisine of Mozambique
- Languages of Mozambique
- Media in Mozambique
- National symbols of Mozambique
  - Coat of arms of Mozambique
  - Flag of Mozambique
  - National anthem of Mozambique
- Prostitution in Mozambique
- Public holidays in Mozambique
- Religion in Mozambique
  - Hinduism in Mozambique
  - Islam in Mozambique
  - Judaism in Mozambique
- World Heritage Sites in Mozambique

=== Art ===
- Music of Mozambique

=== Sports ===
Sports in Mozambique

- Football in Mozambique
- Mozambique at the Olympics

== Economy and infrastructure ==
Economy of Mozambique

- Economic rank, by nominal GDP (2007): 123rd (one hundred and twenty third)
- Agriculture in Mozambique
- Communications in Mozambique
  - Internet in Mozambique
- Companies of Mozambique
- Currency of Mozambique: Metical
  - ISO 4217: MZN
- Health care in Mozambique
- Mining in Mozambique
- Tourism in Mozambique
- Transport in Mozambique
  - Airports in Mozambique
  - Rail transport in Mozambique
- Water supply and sanitation in Mozambique

== Education ==
Education in Mozambique

== See also ==
Mozambique

- List of international rankings
- List of Mozambique-related topics
- Member state of the Commonwealth of Nations
- Member state of the United Nations
- Outline of Africa
- Outline of geography
