= List of defunct airlines of Mozambique =

This is a list of defunct airlines of Mozambique.

Airline	Image	IATA	ICAO	Callsign	Commenced operations	Ceased operations	Notes
Aero Pulse					1992	1994	
Aerovisão de Moçambique					2011	2011	
Air Corridor		QC	CRD		2004	2008	
ASAS de Moçambique					2001	2009	Operated Embraer Brasilia
CASS Companhia Aérea do Sul do Save					1976	1977	To COMAG Companhia Moçambicano de Aviação Geral
COMAG Companhia Moçambicano de Aviação Geral					1977	1980	Renamed to TTA Empresa Nacional de Transporte e Trabalho Aéreo. Operated BN-2 Islander
DETA Direção de Exploração dos Transportes Aéreos		TM		DETA	1936	1980	Renamed to LAM Mozambique Airlines. Operated Boeing 737, DH Dove, DH Dragonfly, Dragon Rapide, DC-3, F27 Friendship, Ju 52
EMAC Empreza Moçambicana de Aviação Comercio					1977	1980	To COMAG Companhia Moçambicano de Aviação Geral
Emilio Air Charter					2011	2013	Banned in EU. AOC revoked
ETA Air Charter					2011	2017	Operated BN-2 Islander, Let L-410UVP
ETAPA Empreza de Transportes Aéreos de Pemba					2011	2017	To COMAG Companhia Moçambicano de Aviação Geral
Ethiopian Mozambique Airlines		ET	EMZ	EMOZ	2018	2021	
Fastjet Mozambique					2017	2019	
Interocean Airways					1968	2000	Operated DHC-4 Caribou, Douglas DC-3, Douglas DC-4, Douglas DC-6
Natair					1993	2001	
OTA Organizações de Transportes Aéreos					1976	1977	To COMAG Companhia Moçambicano de Aviação Geral
Railway Administration					1936	1936	Operated de Havilland Hornet Moth, de Havilland Dragonfly
SAB Servicios Aereos de Beira					1975	1977	To COMAG Companhia Moçambicano de Aviação Geral. Operated BN-2 Islander, Piper Aztec, Piper Navajo
Sabin Air					1991	2002	Founded by Carlos Goncalves. Renamed to Transairways. Operated Embraer Bandeirante
SAN Servicio Aéreo do Norte					1976	1977	To COMAG Companhia Moçambicano de Aviação Geral
STA Sociedade de Transportes Aéreos					2004	2010	Rebranded as TTA Sociedade de Transporte e Trabalho Aéreo
STATSA Scan Transportes Aereos					1991	1998	Renamed to Unique Air Charter. Humanitarian relief flights. Operated Douglas C-47
TAC Transportes Aereos Comercial					?	1977	To COMAG Companhia Moçambicano de Aviação Geral
TAM Transportes Aereos de Mocambique					1974	1977	To COMAG Companhia Moçambicano de Aviação Geral
TAN Transportes Aereos de Niassa					1976	1977	To COMAG Companhia Moçambicano de Aviação Geral
TAZ Transports Aereos de Zambezia					1976	1977	To COMAG Companhia Moçambicano de Aviação Geral
Transairways			TWM		2002	2009	Established as Sabin Air. Renamed to Kaya Airlines
TTA Empresa Nacional de Transporte e Trabalho Aereo		2Z	TTA		1980	2000	Renamed to TTA Airlink. Operated BN-2 Islander
TTA Airlink		4Z	LNK		2010	2010	
Unique Air Charter					1998	2011	Established as STATSA Scan Transportes Aereos

== See also ==
- List of airlines of Mozambique
- List of airports in Mozambique
