= List of companies of Mozambique =

Location of Mozambique

Mozambique, officially the Republic of Mozambique, is a country in Southeast Africa. The economy of Mozambique has developed since the end of the Mozambican Civil War (1977–1992), but the country is still one of the world's poorest and most underdeveloped. The resettlement of civil war refugees and successful economic reform have led to a high growth rate: the country enjoyed a remarkable recovery, achieving an average annual rate of economic growth of 8% between 1996 and 2006 and between 6%–7% from 2006 to 2011. Also, more than 1,200 state-owned enterprises (mostly small) have been privatised. Preparations for privatisation and/or sector liberalisation are underway for the remaining parastatal enterprises, including telecommunications, energy, ports, and railways.done

== Notable firms ==
This list includes notable companies with primary headquarters located in the country. The industry and sector follow the Industry Classification Benchmark taxonomy. Organizations which have ceased operations are included and noted as defunct.

Notable companies Status: P=Private, S=State; A=Active, D=Defunct
Name	Industry	Sector	Headquarters	Founded	Notes	Status	
Air Corridor	Consumer services	Airlines	Nampula	2004	Airline, defunct 2008	P	D
Banco Nacional de Investimento	Financials	Banks	Maputo	2010	State development bank	S	A
Bank of Mozambique	Financials	Banks	Maputo	1975	Central bank	S	A
Mozambique Ports and Railways	Industrials	Transports and logistics	Maputo	1931	Railway and ports	S	A
Beira Railroad Corporation	Industrials	Railroads	?	2005	Railway	P	D
Correios de Moçambique	Industrials	Delivery services	Maputo	?	Post	P	A
Electricidade de Moçambique	Utilities	Conventional electricity	Maputo	1995	State-owned power	S	A
Kaya Airlines	Consumer services	Airlines	Maputo	1991	Airline	P	A
LAM Mozambique Airlines	Consumer services	Airlines	Maputo	1937	Airline	S	A
Moçambique Expresso	Consumer services	Airlines	Beira	1995	Airline, part of LAM Mozambique Airlines	P	A
Mozal	Basic materials	Aluminum	Maputo	1998	Aluminum	P	A
Savana News	Consumer services	Publishing	Maputo	1993	Newspaper	P	A
Telecomunicações de Moçambique	Telecommunications	Fixed line telecommunications	Maputo	1981	Telecom, ISP	P	A

Telecomunicações de Moçambique's corporate headquarters in Maputo, the capital of Mozambique

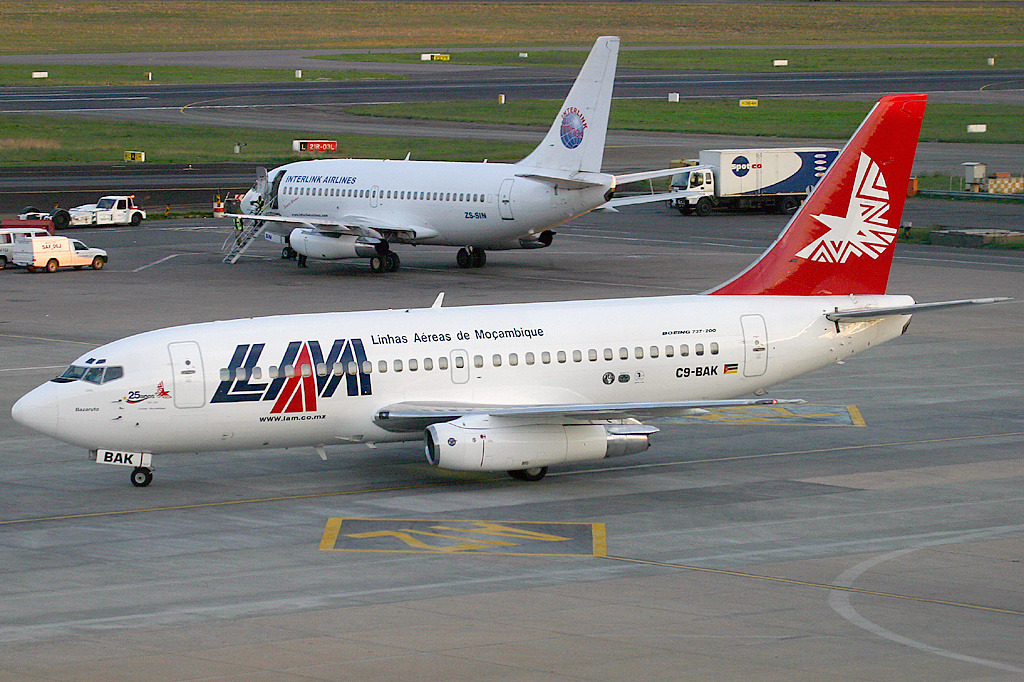
A LAM Mozambique Airlines Boeing 737-200 Advanced at OR Tambo International Airport (2005)

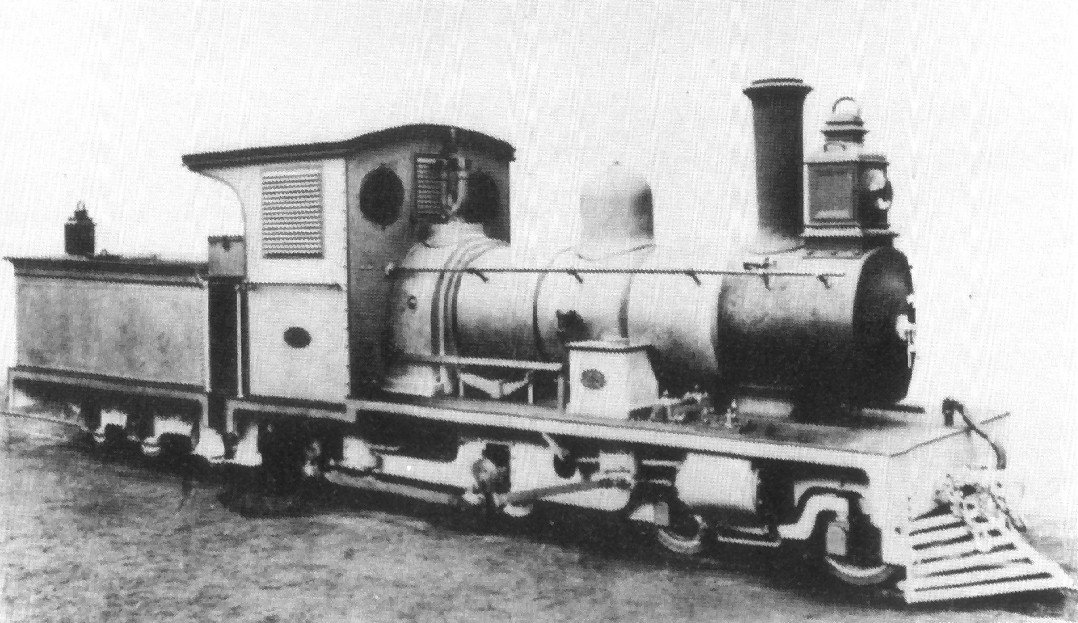
A Beira Railroad Corporation Railway Class F4 No. 38 (in 1898)

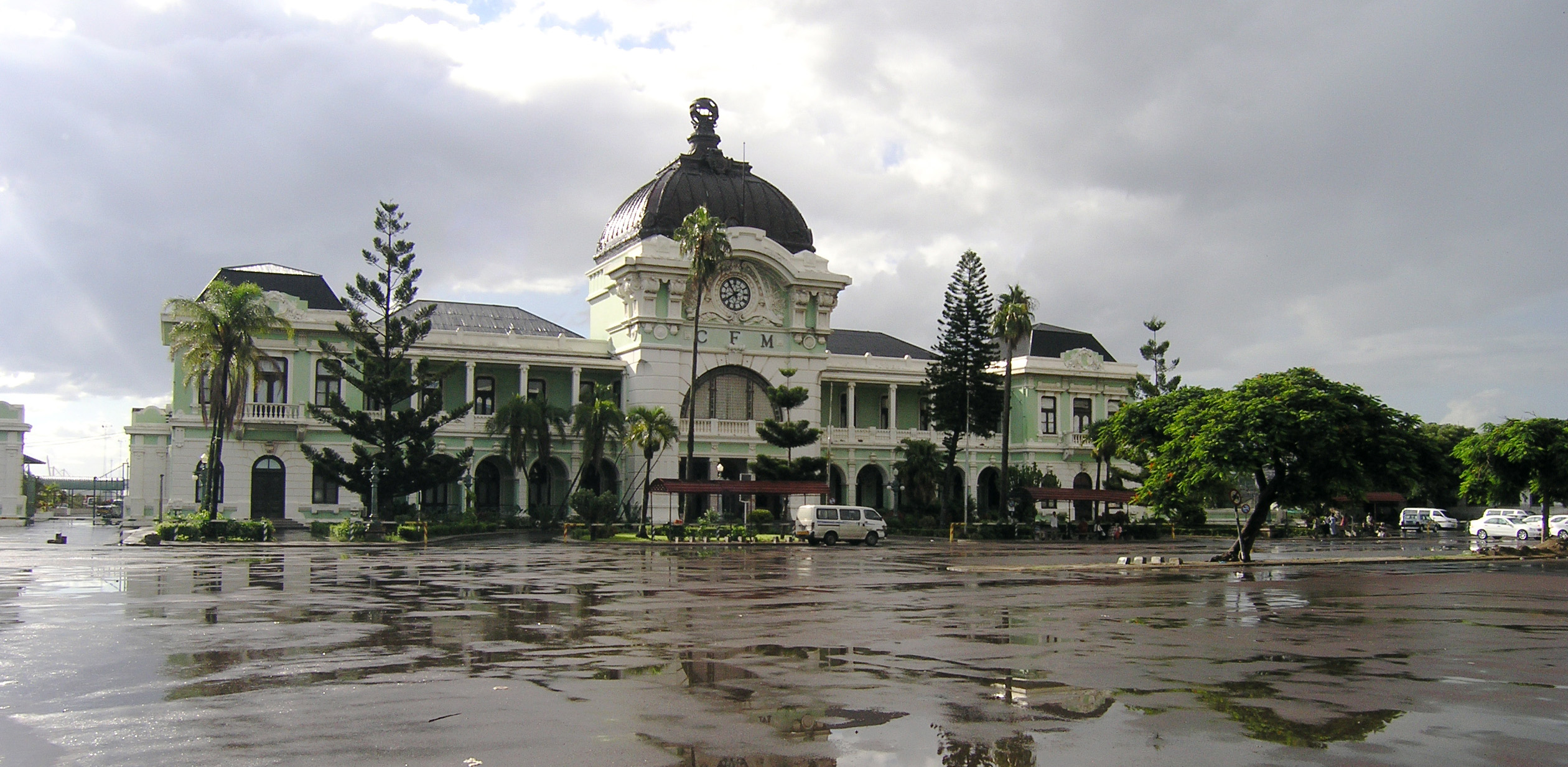
The Maputo Railway Station, built between 1913 and 1916.

== See also ==
- List of airlines of Mozambique
- List of banks in Mozambique
- Economy of Mozambique
