= Rui Baltazar =

Mozambican politician (1933–2024)

Minister of Finance
- In office 1978–1986
- Preceded by: Salamão Munguambe
- Succeeded by: Abdul Magid Osman

Minister of Justice
- In office 1975–1978
- Succeeded by: Teodato Hunguana

Member of the Assembly of the Republic
- In office 1975–1992

Personal details
- Born: Rui Baltazar dos Santos Alves; 1933 Lourenço Marques, Portuguese Mozambique
- Died: 13 July 2024 (aged 91) Maputo, Mozambique
- Party: FRELIMO
- Education: University of Coimbra

Rui Baltazar dos Santos Alves (1933 – 13 July 2024) was a Mozambican lawyer, politician and academic who was an active supporter of FRELIMO during the Mozambican War of Independence.

== Life and career ==
Baltazar was born in Lourenço Marques (today Maputo) to a Portuguese Mozambican family. During colonial rule, he used his position as an attorney to defend political prisoners of the Portuguese authorities, and upon independence was appointed the first Minister of Justice of People's Republic of Mozambique. In 1975, he also helped draft the Constitution of the newly independent nation. In 1978, he was appointed Minister of Finance, a position he held until 1986. In April 1986, he became rector of Eduardo Mondlane University, where he taught human rights law. He was also a member of the Mozambique Parliament from 1975 to 1992 and was Mozambique's representative to the EEC-ACP assembly. He signed the Lomé Convention on behalf of Mozambique in 1986.

In 1994, Baltazar was nominated as the Mozambican ambassador to Sweden, Denmark, and Norway and in 2002 became special advisor to the President of the SADC.

Baltazar died in Maputo on 13 July 2024, at the age of 91.
