= Gilles Cistac =

French-Mozambican lawyer

Gilles Cistac (November 11, 1961 − March 3, 2015) was a French-Mozambican lawyer specialised in constitutional law. He was shot and killed and political motives were suspected. The RENAMO party organised protests.

== Biography ==
Gilles Cistac was born in 1961 in the French city of Toulouse. He studied public law in Toulouse and graduated there in 1998.

=== Move to Mozambique ===
In 1993 Cistac came as an advisor to Mozambique working for the French embassy providing assistance to the Mozambican state in creating a new electoral law. After a short stay back in France, he moved to Mozambique in 1995. Since then he worked as a law professor at Eduardo Mondlane University. Until his death, he was the vice-chair of the investigation department of the law faculty of the university. It was his efforts that led to the creation of the Centro de Estudos sobre a Integração Regional (CEDIR), a small investigation unit working on the harmonisation of the law in the SADC member states.

In 2009, Cistac received the French order of merit Ordre des Palmes Académiques in the rank of a knight (Chevalier) for his work on decentralisation in Mozambique. The "Ordre des Palmes Académiques" is the highest French order of merit in the science area. In 2010 Cistac acquired Mozambican citizenship in addition to his French citizenship.

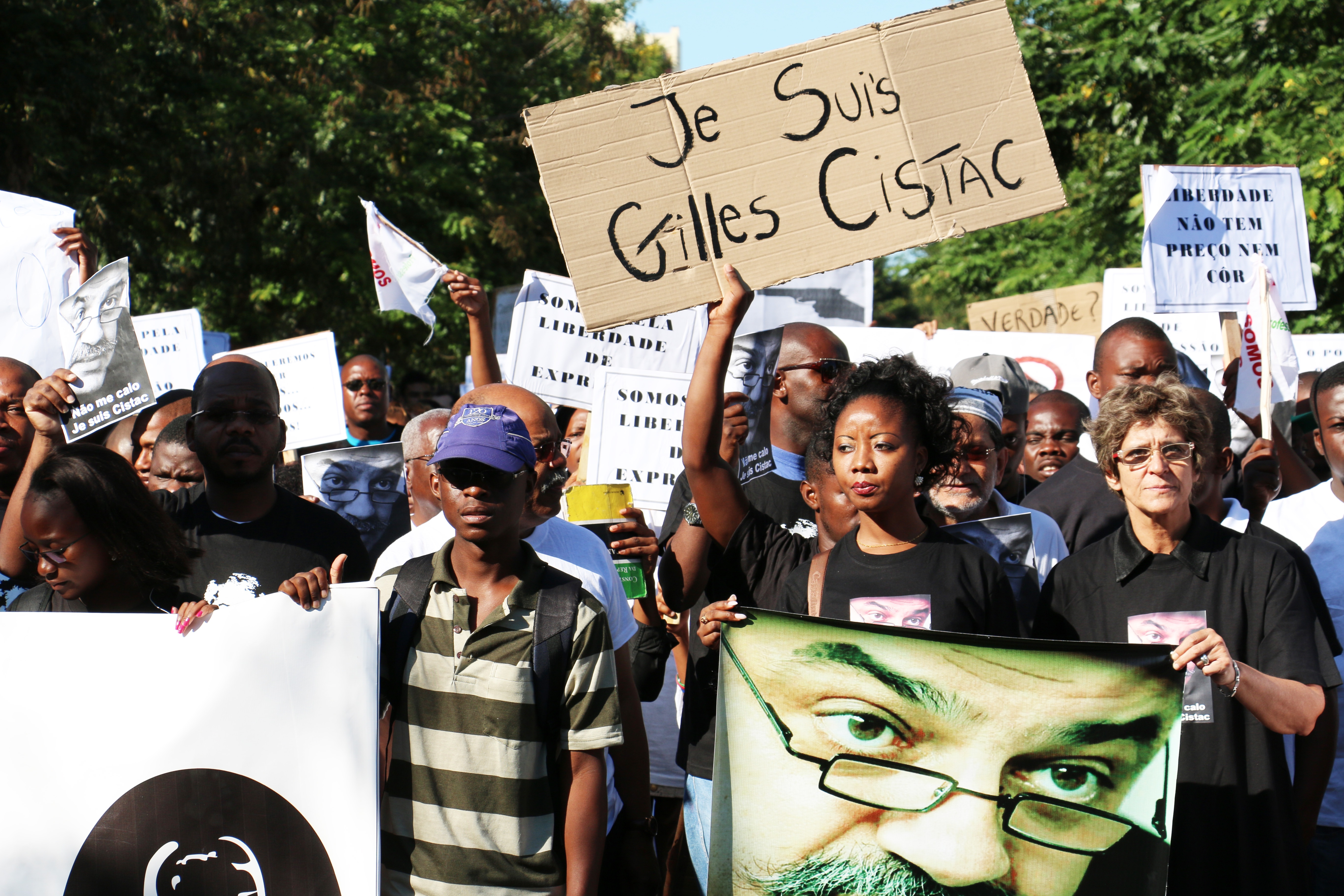
March honouring Gilles Cistac in Maputo on March 7, 2015. In front, Ivone Soares, leader of the RENAMO parliamentary group in the National Parliament.

=== Death ===
In the morning of the March 3, 2015 Gilles Cistac wanted to enter a taxi in front of a café in the Polana neighbourhood, when a car passed by and Cistac was hit by three shots. A few hours later, Cistac died in Maputo's central hospital. The main opposition party, RENAMO, as well as certain oppositional and international media houses blamed radical forces of the ruling FRELIMO party for Cistac's death, while the FRELIMO denied having any relation to this. A few days later, several marches in several Mozambican cities honoured Cistac. Embassies of different states, as of France, the European Union and the United States, condemned the homicide and demanded a fast and effective investigation of it.

Cistac's homicide was seen as a further step in increasing Mozambique's political crisis since 2013.

== Public activities ==
Gilles Cistac was known as a sharp critic of the ruling FRELIMO party, he published his opinion in several oppositional media, despite the fact that he claimed to be independent and not affiliated to any political party. He criticised the constant violation of human rights in Mozambique, the appropriation of the state bureaucracy by the FRELIMO, the concentration of the state's executive power and the weak public prosecution.

After the general elections in 2014 the main opposition party, RENAMO, protested heavily against the results. Especially, the RENAMO claimed to govern the provinces, in which the party won the majority of votes. At the moment, the central government nominates the governors of the provinces. RENAMO leader Afonso Dhlakama demanded the creation of so-called "Autonomous Provinces" and a subsequent constitutional devolution. The FRELIMO party, especially Mozambique's president Filipe Nyusi, denied these requests and called them "unconstitutional". Gilles Cistac contradicted Nyusi and said that, according to Mozambique's constitution, it was possible to create subaltern hierarchies. Cistac prepared a legislative proposal for the RENAMO, which is going to be discussed in the national Parliament.

After publishing his opinion about the possibility of creating "Autonomous Provinces" several media close to the FRELIMO party criticised him for his opinions. The spokesperson of the FRELIMO, Damião José, called Cistac a "liar" and being "dishonest", as well as blaming him not being thankful to the Mozambican people who accepted him "friendly".

== Publication ==
Gilles Cistac published more than 50 works about Mozambican law.

- O direito eleitoral moçambicano – Le droit électoral mozambicain (1994)
- O tribunal administrativo de Moçambique (1997)
- Aspectos jurídicos, económicos e sociais do uso e aproveitamento da terra (2003)
- Turismo e desenvolvimento local (2007)
- 10 anos de descentralização em Moçambique : os caminhos sinuosos de um processo emergente (2008)
- Direito processual administrativo contencioso teoria e prática (2010)
- Manual Prático de Jurisprudência Eleitoral (2011), ISBN 978-9896700263
- Aspectos jurídicos da integração regional (2012), ISBN 978-9896700317
