= Helena Kida =

Mozambican judicial magistrate and politician

Her Excellency Helena Kida
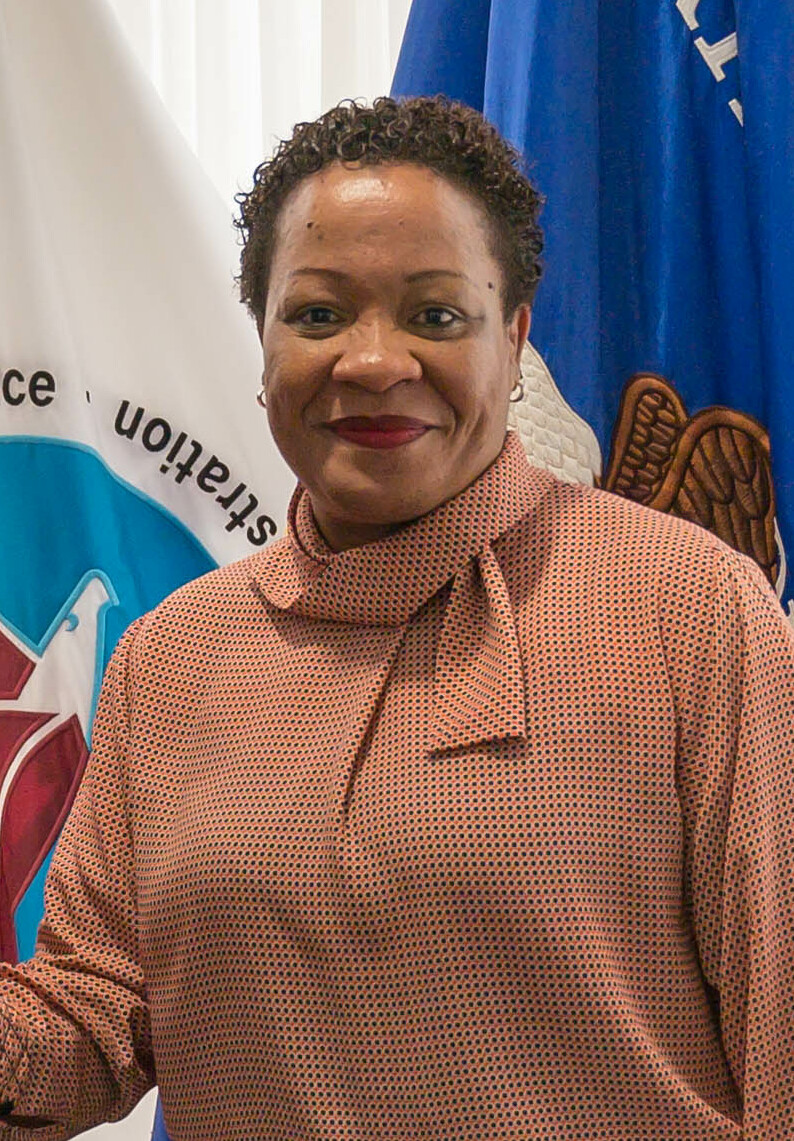
- Kida in 2019

Minister of Justice, Constitutional and Religious Affairs
- Incumbent
- Assumed office 20 January 2020
- President: Filipe Nyusi
- Preceded by: Joaquim Veríssimo

Deputy Minister of Interior
- In office 13 November 2017 – 20 January 2020
- President: Filipe Nyusi
- Preceded by: Jose dos Santos Coimbra
- Succeeded by: Vacant (2020)

Personal details
- Born: 12 October 1971 (age 54)
- Party: FRELIMO
- Education: Eduardo Mondlane University; Federal University of Bahia
- Profession: Judicial Magistrate

Helena Mateus Kida is a Mozambican judicial magistrate and politician who has been the Minister of Justice, Constitutional and Religious Affairs since January 2020. A member of FRELIMO, Kida previously served as the deputy minister of interior from 2017 to 2020.

== Early life and education ==
Kida was born on 12 October 1971 in what is today the Metangula district in the Niassa Province. She attended the FRELIMO school in Maputo for her primary education before progressing on to the Francisco Manyanga Secondary School. Having finished school, Kida enrolled at the Eduardo Mondlane University Law School, from which she graduated in 1997. She earned a Master of Laws from the Federal University of Bahia in Brazil in 2004. Prior to entering the judiciary, Kida completed a course at the Centre for Legal and Judiciary Training.

== Career ==
Kida started her career in the judiciary as a district judge of the Chibuto Judicial Court in the Gaza Province in 2006. In 2008, she became a judge of the Boane District Court. After two years in the role, she was appointed a judge of the Kampfumo District Court in 2010. Kida was named a judge of the Criminal Investigation Section of Maputo Province Judicial Court in 2011. She moved to the 4th labour section of the court in 2015. In 2017, she was appointed to the Police Court.

== In government ==
In November 2017, Mozambican president Filipe Nyusi appointed her as Deputy Minister of Interior, replacing Jose dos Santos Coimbra. She was sworn in on 13 November. After Nyusi was sworn in for a second term as president in January 2020, he named his cabinet which saw Kida appointed as Minister of Justice, Constitutional and Religious Affairs.

In June 2023, Kida and her Rwanda counterpart, Soline Nyirahabimana, signed an extradition treaty as well as an agreement on mutual legal assistance in criminal matters.

Kida is a member of the Central Committee of FRELIMO.
