= Teodato Hunguana =

Mozambican lawyer and politician

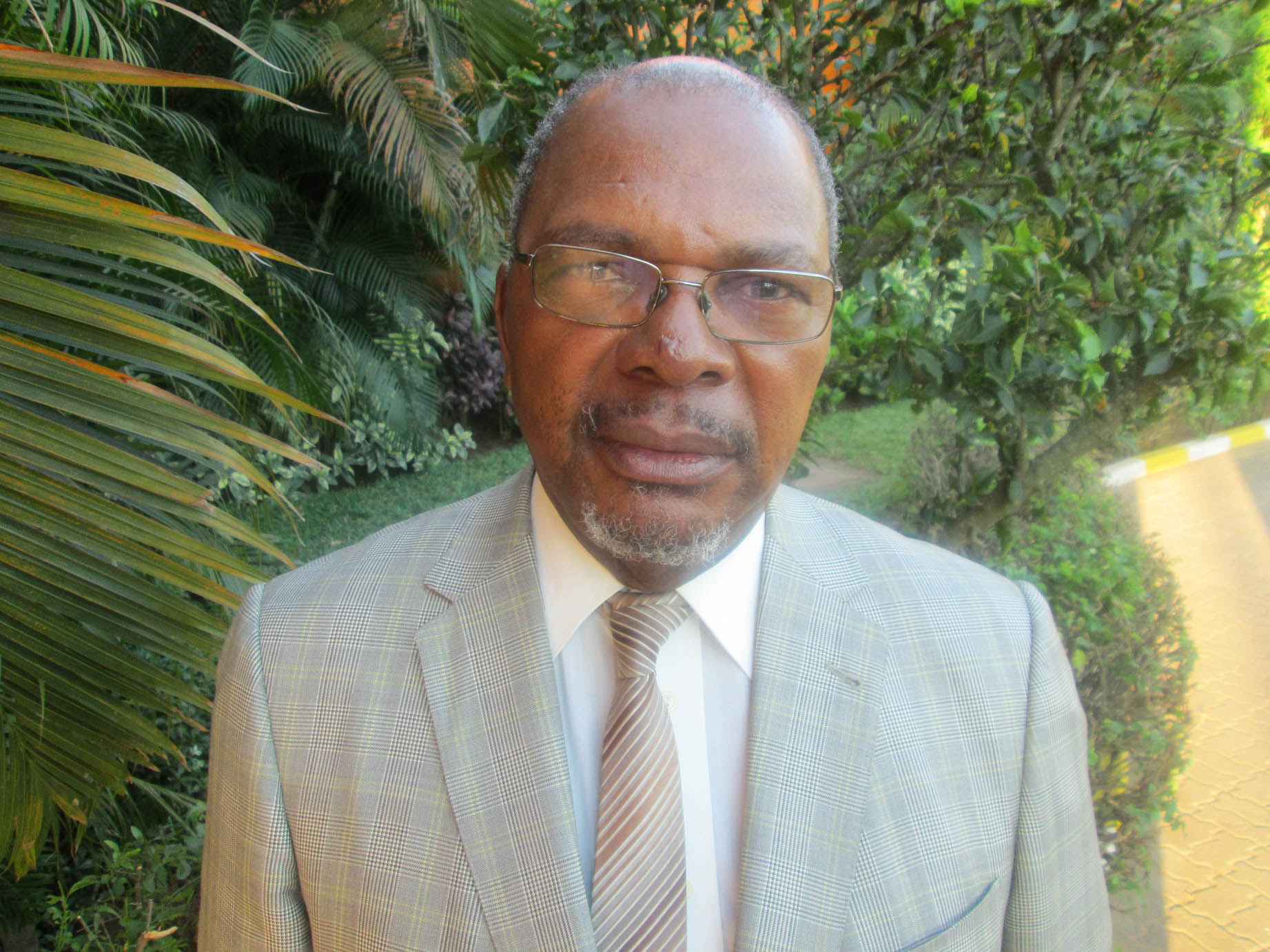
Teodato Hunguana (2012)

Teodato Mondim da Silva Hunguana (born 1946) is a Mozambican lawyer and politician who was the chairman of the boards of Telecomunicações de Moçambique (Mozambique Telecom) and M-Cel.

== Life and career ==
He was born in 1946, the son of Augusto da Silva Hunguana and Amélia Abudo Hunguana. He graduated with a Law Degree from the University of Lisbon (Universidade Clássica de Lisboa) in 1972, becoming one of the very few black Mozambican lawyers.

He became National Director of Labour in 1975 following Mozambique's independence from Portuguese rule on 25 June 1975. He was then appointed Minister of Justice in 1978 by President Samora Machel and held that post until being appointed as Deputy Minister of the Interior in 1983. In that role, he helped resettle unemployed urban residents to rural areas. In 1986, President Machel appointed him Minister of Information. Hunguana's appointment occurred a couple of months before Machel and thirty three others were killed in a tragic plane crash in Mbuzini, South Africa. While Hunguana was Minister of Information, several journalists were either expelled from Mozambique, dismissed from their positions, arrested, or resigned after harassment from the ministry.

After the death of Machel, he remained Minister of Information until being appointed as Minister of Labour by President Joaquim Chissano in 1991, a post he had previously held concurrently with Minister of Justice following the death of Alberto Cassimo in 1980. Hunguana remained in government until the formation of a new government, which resulted from the first multiparty general elections in 1994.

Alongside his ministerial duties he was a member of the government's delegation that negotiated the Peace Accord with RENAMO in October 1992 after two years of negotiations in Rome.

Hunguana was a member of the Assembly of the Republic of Mozambique from the early 1980s until 2003 as part of the Frelimo Party. In 2003, he was appointed by Parliament to fill one of the Judge vacancies in the newly formed Constitutional Council in 2003 and was in that position for one five-year term before requesting to step down.

He is the author of Nwamatibjana, published in 1997 (LC 97980602).

From June 2010, he is the chairman of the board of directors of M-Cel, a publicly owned cell phone company. In March 2011, he was appointed the chairman of the board of Telecomunicações de Moçambique (Mozambique Telecom).
