= Ivone Soares =

Mozambican politician (born 1979)

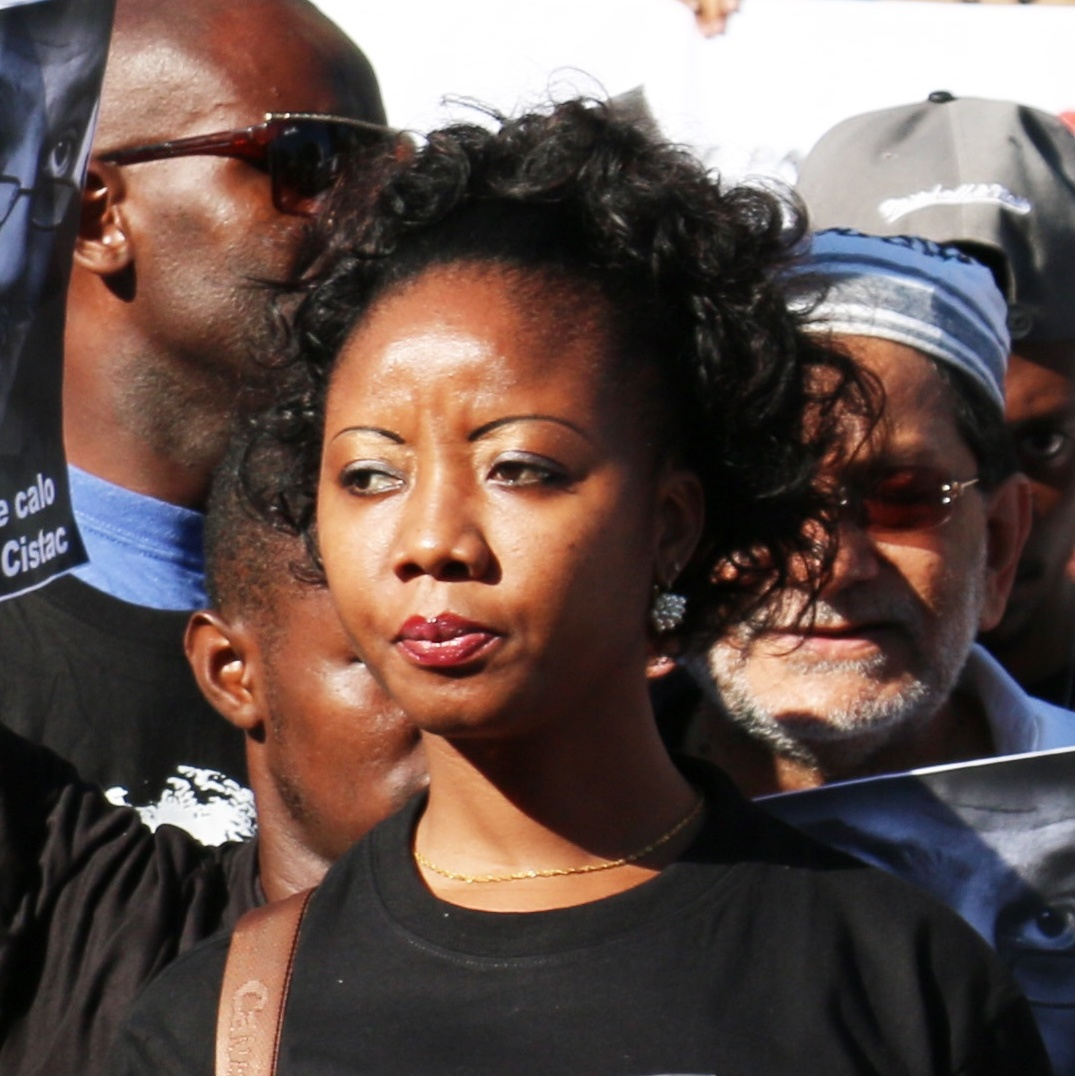
- Born: 23 October 1979 (age 46); Maputo
- Occupation: politician
- Political party: RENAMO

Ivone Soares (born 23 October 1979) is a Mozambican politician. She is the deputy leader of Mozambican National Resistance (known as RENAMO) and leads its parliamentary party in the Assembly of the Republic. Soares is also a member of the Pan-African Parliament where she is vice-president of youth. She was the target of an attempted assassination in September 2016.

== Career ==
Ivone Soares was born on 23 October 1979 in Bairro Central in Maputo. Her father was a technical engineer for Radio Mozambique and her uncle is opposition leader and RENAMO politician Afonso Dhlakama. Soares' family grew up near Maputo Cathedral and she attended the Josina Machel and Francisco Manyanga secondary schools. Whilst growing up Soares became interested in politics and began leafleting for RENAMO at the age of 14 and attended meetings of its youth league. As soon as she turned 18 Soares registered as a member of the organisation. Her mother is a member of the opposing FRELIMO party. Soares has a degree in communications science and in 2015 studied for a master's degree in public administration.

Soares applied unsuccessfully for a civil servant position at the Ministry of Youth and Sports early in her career, she was unsuccessful and has never again worked in the public sector. She was head of external affairs at RENAMO and a spokesperson for the party's election office. She since became a member of the Assembly of the Republic, representing RENAMO in the Zambezia Province. When Soares entered parliament she was one of Mozambique's youngest politicians. She is now chairperson and deputy head of RENAMO and leads its parliamentary group.

Soares is secretary for women politicians in the Democratic Union of Africa, a continental centrist association. She is a member of the Pan-African Parliament and its Permanent Commission of Justice and Human Rights. Soares is also vice-president of youth for the Pan-African Parliament and president of RENAMO's youth league.

In Mozambique Soares has encouraged citizens to cooperate with census officials to improve the quality of information recorded. She favours decentralisation and wants more powers to be devolved to regional governors, many of which are Renamo members – this would require an amendment to the Constitution of Mozambique. Soares is also seeking to establish provincial police forces to supplement the federal force.

Soares was subject to an attempted assassination on 8 September 2016 by an assassin on a motorbike. The attempt failed when his AK-47 type weapon jammed and Soares was able to escape by car.
