= List of airlines of Mozambique =

This is a list of airlines currently operating in Mozambique.

Airline	Image	IATA	ICAO	Callsign	Commenced operations	Notes
LAM Mozambique Airlines		TM	LAM	MOZAMBIQUE	1936	
Moçambique Expresso			MXE	MOZAMBIQUE EXPRESS	1995	

== See also ==
- List of airlines
- List of defunct airlines of Mozambique
- List of air carriers banned in the European Union
- List of companies based in Mozambique
