= Ministry of Justice (Mozambique) =

Ministry in the government of Mozambique

The Ministry of Justice, Constitutional and Religious Affairs of Mozambique has responsibilities such as administering the civil court system and overseeing the prison system. At one time, the ministry published jurisprudence from the main courts, but has since discontinued this practice.

== List of ministers (Post-1975 upon achieving independence) ==
- Rui Baltazar dos Santos Alves (1975–1978)
- Teodato Hunguana (1978–1983)
- José Óscar Monteiro (1983–1984)
- Ossumane Ali Dauto (1984–1995)
- Jose Ibraimo Abudo (1995–2005)
- Esperanza Machavela (2007–2008) [1st female]
- Maria Benvinda Levy (2008–2015)
- Abdurremane Lino de Almeida (2015–2016)
- Isaque Chande (2016–2018)
- Joaquim Veríssimo (2018–2020)
- Helena Kida (2020–present)

== See also ==
- Justice ministry
- Politics of Mozambique
