= Telecommunications in Mozambique =

Telecommunications in Mozambique include radio, television, fixed and mobile telephones, and the Internet.

== Radio and television ==
- Radio stations:
  - state-run radio provides nearly 100% territorial coverage and broadcasts in multiple languages; a number of privately owned and community-operated stations; transmissions of multiple international broadcasters are available (2007);
  - AM 13, FM 17, shortwave 11 (2001).
- Radios: 730,000 (1997).
- Television stations: 1 state-run TV station supplemented by private TV station; Portuguese state TV's African service, RTP Africa, and Brazilian-owned TV Miramar are available (2007).
- Televisions: 90,000 (1997).

== Telephones ==
- Main lines:
  - 88,100 lines in use, 148th in the world (2012);
  - 78,300 lines in use (2008).
- Mobile cellular:
  - 8.1 million lines (2012);
  - 4.4 million lines (2008).
- Telephone system:
  - General assessment: a fair telecommunications system that is with a heavy state presence, lack of competition, and high operating costs and charges (2011);
  - Domestic: stagnation in the fixed-line network contrasts with rapid growth in the mobile-cellular network; mobile-cellular coverage now includes all the main cities and key roads, including those from Maputo to the South African and Eswatini borders, the national highway through Gaza and Inhambane provinces, the Beira corridor, and from Nampula to Nacala; extremely low fixed-line teledensity; despite significant growth in mobile-cellular services, teledensity remains low at about 35 per 100 persons (2011);
  - International: calling code +258; landing point for the EASSy and SEACOM fiber-optic submarine cable systems; Satellite earth stations – 5 Intelsat (2 Atlantic Ocean and 3 Indian Ocean) (2011).

== Internet ==
- Top-level domain: .mz
- Internet exchange: Mozambique Internet Exchange (Moz-Ix).
- Internet users:
  - 1.1 million users, 114th in the world; 4.8% of the population, 188th in the world (2012).
  - 613,600, 113th in the world (2009).
- Fixed broadband: 19,753 subscriptions, 129th in the world; 0.1% of the population, 168th in the world (2012).
- Wireless broadband: 431,988 subscriptions, 94th in the world; 1.8% of the population, 127th in the world (2012).
- Internet hosts:
  - 89,737 hosts, 82nd in the world (2012);
  - 21,172 (2010).
- IPv4: 343,296 addresses allocated, less than 0.05% of the world total, 14.6 addresses per 1000 people (2012).

Mozambique has a comparatively low Internet penetration rate with only 4.8% of the population having access to the Internet compared to 16% for Africa as a whole.

Telecommunication de Mozambique (TDM), Mozambique's national fixed-line operator, offers ADSL Internet access for home and business customers. In early 2014 packages ranged from 512 kbit/s with a 6 GByte cap for MTN750 (~US$21) to 4 Mbit/s with a 43 GByte cap for MTN4300 (~US$118).

The three mobile operators, Movitel, mCel and Vodacom, also offer 3G Internet access.

Mozambique was the first African country to offer broadband wireless services using WiMax.

With the introduction of the SEACOM submarine cable in July 2009 and the EASSY submarine cable in July 2010, Mozambique now has access to less expensive international connectivity and is no longer reliant on VSAT or neighbor South Africa for Internet transit services.

=== Internet censorship and surveillance ===
There are no government restrictions on access to the Internet, however, opposition party members report government intelligence agents monitor e-mail.

The constitution and law provide for freedom of speech and the press, and the government generally respects these rights in practice. Individuals can generally criticize the government publicly or privately without reprisal. Some individuals express a fear that the government monitors their private telephone and e-mail communications. Many journalists practice self-censorship.

== See also ==
- Telephone numbers in Mozambique
- Televisão de Moçambique, the government owned national public broadcaster of Mozambique.
