= List of World Heritage Sites in Mozambique =

Location of World Heritage Sites in Mozambique

The United Nations Educational, Scientific and Cultural Organization (UNESCO) World Heritage Sites are places of importance to cultural or natural heritage as described in the UNESCO World Heritage Convention, established in 1972. Cultural heritage consists of monuments (such as architectural works, monumental sculptures, or inscriptions), groups of buildings, and sites (including archaeological sites). Natural features (consisting of physical and biological formations), geological and physiographical formations (including habitats of threatened species of animals and plants), and natural sites which are important from the point of view of science, conservation or natural beauty, are defined as natural heritage. Mozambique accepted the convention on November 27, 1982, making its historical sites eligible for inclusion on the list. As of 2025, Mozambique has two World Heritage Sites, one of which is transnational, with a further three on the tentative list.

== World Heritage Sites ==
UNESCO lists sites under ten criteria; each entry must meet at least one of the criteria. Criteria i through vi are cultural, and vii through x are natural.

* Transnational site

World Heritage Sites
Site	Image	Location (province)	Year listed	UNESCO data	Description
Island of Mozambique	Houses on the Island of Mozambique, sailboats next to them	Nampula Province	1991	599; iv, vi (cultural)	
iSimangaliso Wetland Park – Maputo National Park*	A lake with a shore house and some birds	Maputo Province	2025	914; vii, ix, x (natural)	The iSimangaliso Wetland Park in South Africa was inscribed in 1999, and the site was expanded to include the Maputo National Park in 2025.

== Tentative list ==
In addition to sites inscribed on the World Heritage List, member states can maintain a list of tentative sites that they may consider for nomination. Nominations for the World Heritage List are only accepted if the site was previously listed on the tentative list.

World Heritage Sites
Site	Image	Location (province)	Year listed	UNESCO criteria	Description
Manyikeni and Chibuene		Inhambane Province	1997	iii (cultural)	In the second millennium AD, Manyikeni was a Zimbabwean regional centre of trade. In the days of the Kingdom of Great Zimbabwe, was a town which was located in the same state as the capital of Great Zimbabwe. It created a relationship between the coast and interior of Great Zimbabwe. It is located fifty two kilometres west of Vilanculos in south-central Mozambique. A plethora of glass beads have been found, mostly in the enclosure but also some outside it. Gold which has appeared has also followed this pattern, only being found in the platform of the enclosure. These, along with an iron gong close to the enclosure, suggests of contact with the south African interior. Various Zimbabwean gongs report similar gongs. A coastal contact with Chibuene, indicated through sea shells near the site, was possibly made. finds of sea shells indicate contact with the coast This contact was possibly made through Chibuene, which is located about 50 kilometres from Manyikeni. Pottery, green celadon along with blue and white Chinese porcelain, has been found too. It is a stone wall enclosure. Chibuene, located 5 km south of Vilanculos and very close to the seashore, was also a coastaltrading station in the late first and early second millenniums AD. It is approximately 250 kilometres from Sofala. Various goods have been found near its coast. These include fragments of Islamic glazed wares, glass beads, and bottles. It has been shown, using radiocarbon dating that these were produced before 1000. Due to the date of these artefacts, it is suspected that Chibuene was integrated into Indian Ocean trade in the early stages. Along with crucibles, used to melt gold, gold globules have also been found. These globules are presumed to be from the Zimbabwe plateau. Many of these findings took place near Limpopo, Bambandyanalo, and Schroda.
The Quirimbas Archipelago	A beach, in the distance there is dense vegetation	Cabo Delgado Province	2008	ii, iv, x (mixed)	
Vumba Mountain Range	A hut in front of a mountain and forest	Manica Province	2008	iii, vi (cultural)	
