= TTA Airlink =

IATA	ICAO	Call sign
4Z	LNK	—
- Founded: 2010
- Ceased operations: 2010

The logo of TTA Airlink

TTA Airlink was a joint venture of Mozambican airline TTA Empresa Nacional de Transporte e Trabalho Aéreo and South African airline Airlink. They started providing service between Johannesburg and Maputo in February 2010, using an Avro RJ85 leased from Airlink. There were plans to service domestic flights within Mozambique. On March 15, 2010, they expanded service to Tetes Chingozi Airport, Beira Airport and Nampula.

The airline has since become defunct.
