= International rankings of Mozambique =

These are the international rankings of Mozambique

== International rankings ==
Organization	Survey	Ranking
Institute for Economics and Peace	Global Peace Index	53 out of 160
United Nations Development Programme	Human Development Index	172 out of 186
Transparency International	Corruption Perceptions Index	130 out of 180
World Economic Forum	Global Competitiveness Report	129 out of 133
World Intellectual Property Organization	Global Innovation Index, 2026	129 out of 139
