= Air Corridor =

Airline

IATA	ICAO	Call sign
QC	CRD	AIR CORRIDOR
- Founded: 2004
- Ceased operations: 10 January 2008
- Hubs: Nampula Airport
- Fleet size: 2
- Destinations: 7
- Headquarters: Nampula, Mozambique
- Website: www. aircorridor.co.mz

Air Corridor was an airline based in Nampula, Mozambique. It operated domestic services. Its main base was Nampula Airport. Air Corridor ceased operations on 10 January 2008.

== History ==
The airline was established in 2004 and began operations in August 2004 with a single Boeing 737. It was privately owned. Due to safety concerns, United States Government personnel were initially prohibited from using this carrier, a ban that was lifted on 9 February 2007.

== Destinations ==
Air Corridor operated services to the following domestic scheduled destinations (at March 2007): Beira, Tete, Lichinga, Maputo, Nampula, Pemba and Quelimane.

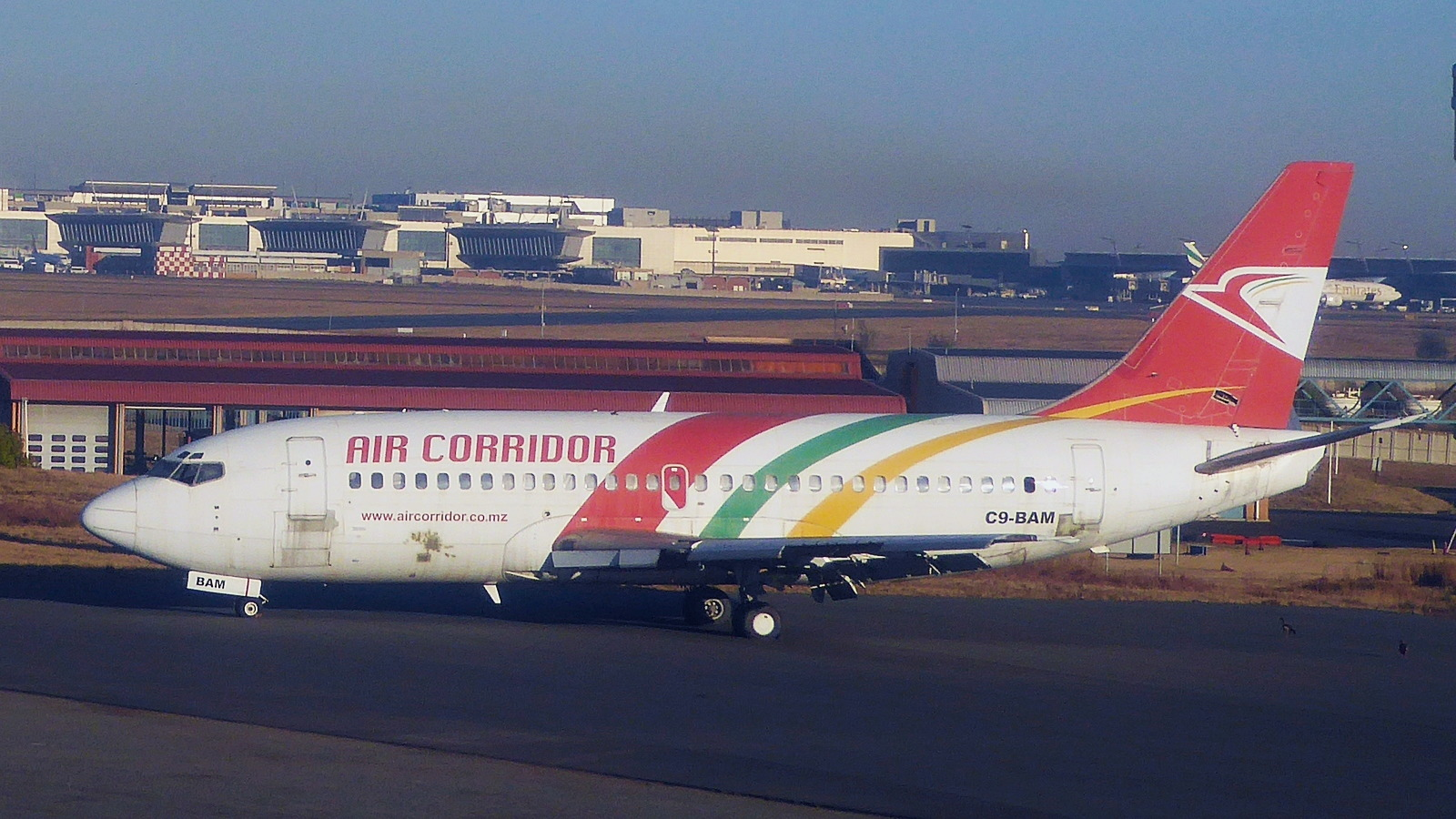
Air Corridor Boeing 737-200

== Fleet ==
The Air Corridor fleet consisted of the following aircraft (at April 2008):

- 2 Boeing 737-200
