= .mz =

Internet country code top-level domain for Mozambique

- Introduced: 4 September 1992
- TLD type: Country code top-level domain
- Status: Active
- Registry: Centro de Informática da Universidade Eduardo Mondlane
- Sponsor: Universidade Eduardo Mondlane
- Intended use: Entities connected with Mozambique
- Actual use: Used in Mozambique
- Registration restrictions: Must have working nameservers and a bona fide intention to use domain
- Structure: Registrations are taken at the third level beneath various second level names
- Dispute policies: Registry disclaims involvement in disputes beyond providing WHOIS information
- Registry website: Centro de Informática da UEM

.mz is the Internet country code top-level domain (ccTLD) for Mozambique. Registrations are at the third level beneath the second-level names co.mz, net.mz, adv.mz, mil.mz, org.mz, ac.mz, gov.mz and edu.mz.
