= Kaya Airlines =

IATA	ICAO	Call sign
IK	KYY	KAMOZ
- Founded: 1991
- Operating bases: Maputo International Airport
- Fleet size: 6
- Headquarters: Maputo, Mozambique
- Website: kayaairlines.com

Kaya Airlines is a Mozambican regional airline based at Maputo International Airport.

== History ==
The airline was founded in 1991 by Carlos Goncalves as Sabin Air to operate on demand charters. The airline was rebranded as Transairways in 2002 for changing name once again in 2009 with the current Kaya Airlines.

Kaya Airlines resumed operations on 29 August 2011, flying within Mozambique. Kaya Airlines restarted operations with flights to a limited number of destinations but hoped to expand the network in the future. In addition to charter flights, the company had started to fly to the island of Inhaca in Maputo and planned to do so to Machangulo and Zongoene. Kaya Airlines was on the List of air carriers banned in the European Union due to its safety issues, preventing it from flying new routes to the European Union for some time.

As of February 2021, the airline ceased operations again with plans to restart services.

== Fleet ==
As of August 2013 the fleet included:

- 2 Embraer EMB 120ER Brasilia
- 2 Let L-410 UVP-e
- 1 Shrike Commander 500
- 1 Piper Chieftain PA-31-325

== Incidents and accidents ==
- On 3 December 2010 a Beechcraft 1900 registration number C9-AUO crashed on approach to runway 23 at Maputo International Airport. The cause was due to bad weather mainly strong winds.
