= Mozal =

Mozambican aluminium company

Coordinates: 25°54′55″S 32°24′47″E

MOZAL, SARL
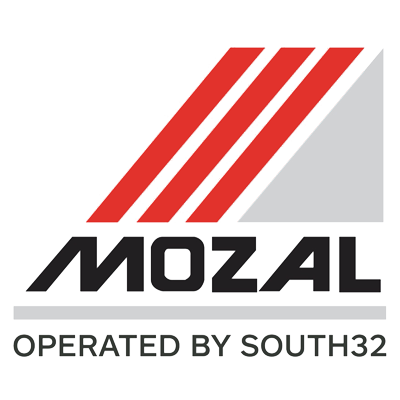
- Company type: Subsidiary
- Industry: Aluminium
- Founded: 1998; 28 years ago
- Headquarters: Maputo, Mozambique
- Products: aluminium products, aluminium alloys
- Revenue: ▲$1.098 billion (2021)
- Net income: ▲$ 123 million (2021)
- Number of employees: 993 (2021)
- Parent: South32
- Website: www.south32.net

Mozal is an aluminium smelter joint project in Beluluane Industrial Park, Maputo, Mozambique. The project is a smelting facility that began operations as a producer of aluminium exclusively for export. The smelter is located 20 kilometres (12 mi) west of the city of Maputo in the south of the country.

Mozal was a joint venture between BHP Billiton (47.1 percent), Mitsubishi Corporation (25 percent), Industrial Development Corp. of South Africa (24 percent), and the Government of Mozambique (3.9 percent).

The project began life in 1998 as part of a recovery programme led by the Mozambican government’s active desire for foreign investment to help rebuild the nation after the country's civil war in the early 1990s. The Mozal smelter was officially opened in September 2000. It was the first major foreign investment in Mozambique and is the biggest private-sector project in the country.

Originally commissioned as a 250 ktpa (250,000 tonnes per annum) smelter, Mozal was followed by an extension (Mozal II) in 2003-04, and it is now the largest aluminium producer in Mozambique and the second-largest in Africa having a total annual production of around 580,000 tonmes. It is responsible for 30 percent of the country’s official exports and also uses 45 percent of the electricity produced in Mozambique.

In February 2013, Mozal signed an agreement under which it would supply 50,000 tonnes of aluminium to Midal Cables, one of the world's largest manufacturers of aluminium cables. Midal's factory in Mozambique started operation in 2014, with a capacity of 50 ktpa of aluminium rods and 24 ktpa of aluminium wire.

BHP Billiton holdings were demerged into South32. South32 currently owns 63.767%, Mitsubishi Corporation (through MCA Metals Holding GmbH), the Industrial Development Corporation of South Africa and the Government of Mozambique share the remaining ownership interest.

In March 2026, operations at Mozal were suspended. South32, the Mozambican government and South African power utility Eskom could not come to an agreement on electricity prices.
