= Telecomunicações de Moçambique =

- Industry: Telecommunications
- Founded: June 10, 1981
- Headquarters: Maputo
- Products: Telecommunications; Broadband Services
- Website: http://www.tdm.mz/

Telecomunicações de Moçambique (TDM) (English: Mozambique Telecommunications) is a telecommunications and Internet service provider in Mozambique. Telecomunicações de Moçambique was created in 1981 following the termination of the Posts, Telegraphs and Telephones (PTT) government agency. In late 2002 TDM was transformed into a Limited Liability Company and was renamed Telecomunicações de Moçambique SARL.

== TDM Group of companies ==
The TDM Group of companies includes Mcel (Mozambique's first mobile operator) of which TDM own 74%. In conjunction with the Visabeira group TDM own 50% of TVCabo Mozambique (a cable television provider) and 50% of TELEVISA. TDM own 100% of its subsidiary Teledata.

== Products and services ==
TDM's corporate headquarters in Maputo

=== Voice ===
TDM provides pre-paid and post-paid telephony services using POTS as well as CDMA and provides ISDN lines for businesses. TDM also owns and operates coin and card-based payphones throughout the country.

=== Internet ===
"TDM BandaLarga" service provides broadband Internet access through ADSL and CDMA (fixed-wireless) and TDM is the largest provider of broadband in the country. ADSL speeds range from 128 kbit/s to 4 Mbit/s with various data caps available as an add-on to a POTS voice service.

TDM also provides Internet services over dedicated circuits as well as IP transit services to other ISPs. The majority of Mozambique's ISPs obtain their international Internet connectivity through TDM.

TDM itself makes use of the EASSy and SEACOM submarine cable systems for international connectivity.

=== Leased line and VPN ===
TDM provides traditional leased line services ranging from 64 kbit/s to STM-1 as well as MPLS VPN services.

=== EASSY submarine cable ===
TDM is a shareholder in WIOCC which is the largest investor in and operator of the EASSy submarine cable system. Through this TDM provides international connectivity to neighbouring landlocked countries in southeastern Africa.
