= 2026 in Mozambique =

- Decades: 2000s; 2010s; 2020s
- See also: Other events of 2026; Timeline of Mozambican history

This article lists events from the year 2026 in Mozambique.

== Incumbents ==
- President: Daniel Chapo
- Prime Minister: Maria Benvinda Levy

== Events ==
=== January ===
- 21 January – At least 13 people are killed by floods mainly affecting Maputo.
- 27 January – TotalEnergies restarts its LNG project in Cabo Delgado Province after a five-year suspension caused by the Battle of Palma.

=== February ===
- 14 February – Cyclone Gezani makes landfall over Inhambane Province, leaving at least four people dead.

=== June ===
- 6 June – The bishop of Quelimane, Osório Citora Afonso, is shot dead by unidentified gunmen inside his official residence in Quelimane.

=== July ===
- 24 July – Margarida Mapanzene resigns as Governor of Gaza Province due to "personal issues".

== Holidays ==
- 1 January – New Year's Day
- 3 February – Heroes' Day
- 7 April – Women's Day
- 1 May – International Workers' Day
- 25 June – Independence Day
- 7 September – Victory Day
- 25 September – Armed Forces Day
- 4 October – Day of Peace and Reconciliation
- 25 December – Family Day

== Deaths ==
- 16 January – Luísa Diogo, 67, prime minister (2004–2010) and minister of economy (2000–2005).
- 6 June – Osório Citora Afonso, 54, Roman Catholic prelate, auxiliary bishop of Maputo (2023–2025) and bishop of Quelimane (since 2025).
