= 2025 in Mozambique =

- Decades: 2000s; 2010s; 2020s
- See also: Other events of 2025; Timeline of Mozambican history

This article lists events from the year 2025 in Mozambique.

== Incumbents ==
- President: Filipe Nyusi (until 15 January); Daniel Chapo (15 January onwards)
- Prime Minister: Adriano Maleiane (until 15 January); Maria Benvinda Levy (15 January onwards)

== Events ==
=== January ===
- 15 January –
  - Daniel Chapo is inaugurated as President of Mozambique.
  - President Chapo appoints Maria Benvinda Levy as prime minister.
- 17 January – A court in the United States sentences former finance minister Manuel Chang to 8.5 years' imprisonment over the "Tuna bonds" scandal.

=== March ===
- 6 March – Police fire on an opposition protest led by Venâncio Mondlane in Maputo, with at least 16 injured, including children.
- 14 March – Cyclone Jude makes landfall in Mozambique, killing six people.

=== April ===
- 29 April – Islamic State-linked militants attack the Niassa Reserve, killing two anti-poaching scouts and injuring another.

=== July ===
- 13 July – The Maputo National Park is designated as a World Heritage Site by UNESCO as part of an expansion from the ISimangaliso Wetland Park in neighbouring South Africa.
- 22 July – Opposition leader Venâncio Mondlane is charged over post-election unrest following the disputed 2024 Mozambican general election.

=== October ===
- 13 October – Around 40 illegal miners attack the Montepuez ruby mine in Cabo Delgado Province, killing two police officers guarding the site.

=== December ===
- 28 December – Mozambique records its first victory at the Africa Cup of Nations, defeating Gabon 3–2 in a Group F match in Agadir, Morocco.

== Holidays ==
- 1 January – New Year's Day
- 3 February – Heroes' Day
- 7 April – Women's Day
- 1 May – International Workers' Day
- 25 June – Independence Day
- 7 September – Victory Day
- 25 September – Armed Forces Day
- 4 October – Day of Peace and Reconciliation
- 25 December – Family Day

== See also ==
- 2024–25 South-West Indian Ocean cyclone season
