= 2016 in Mozambique =

- Decades: 1990s; 2000s; 2010s; 2020s
- See also: Other events of 2016; Timeline of Mozambican history

The following lists events that happened during 2016 in the Republic of Mozambique.

== Incumbents ==
- President: Filipe Nyusi
- Prime Minister: Carlos Agostinho do Rosário

== Events ==
- February - Opening of the Ressano Garcia Thermal Power Station.
- February - Collapse of a wall of the Zimpeto Olympic Pool, killing one person and injuring ten others.
- November - Murder of Elly Warren, an Australian woman who was staying near Tofo Beach, Inhambane province.

=== Sports ===
- 2016 Moçambola
- 2016 FIBA Africa Women's Clubs Champions Cup

== Deaths ==
- 6 April – Jaime Pedro Gonçalves, Catholic archbishop (b. 1936).
