= 2024 in Mozambique =

- Decades: 2000s; 2010s; 2020s
- See also: Other events of 2024; Timeline of Mozambican history

This article lists events from the year 2024 in Mozambique.

== Incumbents ==
- President: Filipe Nyusi
- Prime Minister: Adriano Maleiane

== Events ==
=== April ===
- 7 April – 2024 Mozambique boat disaster: A ferry carrying 130 passengers from Lunga to the Island of Mozambique sinks off the coast of Nampula Province, killing at least 98 people. At least 11 others are rescued.
- 16 April – Eight members of the same family are killed after their boat sinks along a tributary of the Zambezi River in Sofala Province. Two people are rescued, while two others remain missing.

=== May ===
- 10 May – Hundreds of Islamic State-linked fighters attack the town of Macomia, Cabo Delgado Province. It is described as "the most serious attack in the area in some time".

=== August ===
- 8 August – A court in the United States convicts former finance minister Manuel Chang of plunder involving the acceptance of bribes through US banks for approving secret loans from 2002 to 2015 in what became known as the "Tuna bonds" scandal that left the Mozambican government with $2 billion in debt.

=== October ===
- 3 October –Environmental activist Anabela Lemos becomes the first Mozambican to receive the Right Livelihood Award for her role in mobilising communities against "exploitative mega-projects" as director of the organisation Justiça Ambiental!.
- 9 October – 2024 Mozambican general election: Daniel Chapo, the candidate of the ruling FRELIMO party, is declared president-elect following a disputed vote, while FRELIMO wins a majority of seats in the Assembly of the Republic.
- 18 October – Two members of the opposition PODEMOS party are shot and killed in their car by unidentified attackers in Maputo. The victims are Paulo Guambe, the party's spokesperson, and lawyer Elvino Dias.

=== December ===
- 15 December – Cyclone Chido makes landfall over Cabo Delgado Province, killing at least 120 people.
- 23 December – The Constitutional Court affirms FRELIMO's victory in the 2024 Mozambican general election, sparking protests that leave 125 people dead.
- 25 December – More than 6,000 inmates escape from a prison in Maputo during clashes that leave 33 people dead.

== See also ==
- 2023–24 South-West Indian Ocean cyclone season
- Mozambique at the 2024 Summer Olympics
- COVID-19 pandemic in Africa
