= 2021 in Mozambique =

- Decades: 2000s; 2010s; 2020s
- See also: Other events of 2021; Timeline of Mozambican history

This article lists events from the year 2021 in Mozambique.

== Incumbents ==
- President: Filipe Nyusi
- Prime Minister: Carlos Agostinho do Rosário

== Events ==
Ongoing – COVID-19 pandemic in Mozambique

=== January to March ===
- January 14 – COVID-19 pandemic: The government tightens health restrictions as new cases rise to 422 per day. Two hundred five people have died from COVID-19 since the beginning of the pandemic in March 2020.
- January 16 – The Bazaruto Archipelago National Park (PNAB) reports a 47.5% decrease in illegal fishing from 2019 to 2020.
- February 8 – The government conservation department and conservation groups announce the successful reintroduction into the wild of two male and two female spotted hyenas in Zinave National Park for the first time in forty years.
- March 24 – Jihadist groups attack Palma, Cabo Delgado Province, 25 km (16 mi) from gas fields worth US$60 billion.
- March 27 – A British expatriate is reported killed in an attack by jihadists on Palma, according to The Daily Telegraph. Dozens of expatriates are reported killed, and there are reports of beheadings of children as young as eleven years old.
- March 31 – More than 5,300 displaced persons seek refuge in Cabo Delgado Province after ISIS attacks in Palma. Forty-five people flee to Tanzania.

== Deaths ==
- January 29 – Calane da Silva, 75, writer and journalist, COVID-19.
- February 22 – Daviz Simango, 57, politician (Democratic Movement of Mozambique), mayor of Beira; complications from COVID-19 and diabetes

== See also ==
- 2020–21 South-West Indian Ocean cyclone season
- 2021–22 South-West Indian Ocean cyclone season
- COVID-19 pandemic in Africa
- Islamic State of Iraq and the Levant
- Al-Shabaab (militant group)
