= 2015 in Mozambique =

- Decades: 1990s; 2000s; 2010s; 2020s
- See also: Other events of 2015; Timeline of Mozambican history

The following lists events that happened during 2015 in the Republic of Mozambique.

== Incumbents ==
- President: Armando Guebuza (until 16 January), Filipe Nyusi (starting 16 January)
- Prime Minister: Alberto Vaquina (until 16 January), Carlos Agostinho do Rosário (starting 16 January)

== Events ==
=== January ===
- 10 January - A mass poisoning at a funeral in Mozambique involves beer that was supposedly contaminated with crocodile bile leaving at least 56 dead and 146 hospitalized.
- 12 January - The death toll from the poisoned beer rises to at least 69, with 169 in hospital. Reports also question whether the poison involved was actually crocodile bile; several studies have indicated that the substance is relatively harmless. The competing theory is that the actual poison may have been cardiac glycosides found in local plants.
- 13 January - The death toll from contaminated beer in the Mozambique rises to at least 72.

=== March ===
- 3March - Assassination of French-Mozambican lawyer Gilles Cistac, which led to several protests and marches.

=== November ===
- 4 November - The mass poisoning of January was confirmed to have been caused by bacterial contamination of the beer.

== Deaths ==
- 28 August – Paulo Machava, journalist (b. 1954/5).
