= Ernesto Max Elias Tonela =

Mozambican economist and politician

His Excellency Ernesto Max Elias Tonela
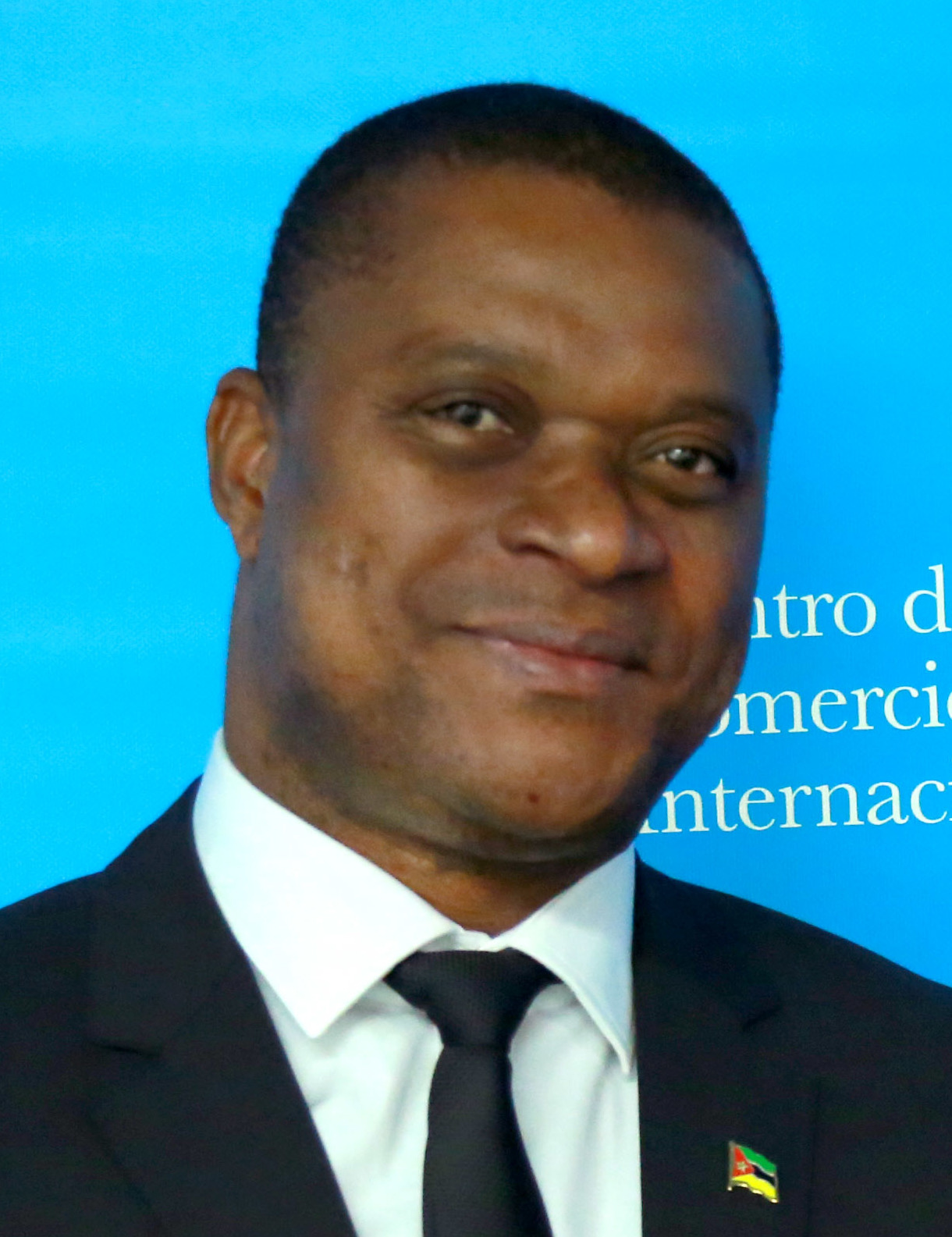
- Tonela in 2017

Minister of Economy and Finance
- In office 4 March 2022 – 2024
- President: Filipe Nyusi
- Prime Minister: Adriano Maleiane
- Preceded by: Adriano Maleiane

Minister of Mineral Resources and Energy
- In office 14 December 2017 – 3 March 2022
- President: Filipe Nyusi
- Prime Minister: Carlos Agostinho do Rosário
- Preceded by: Leticia da Silva Klemens
- Succeeded by: Carlos Joaquim Zacarias

Minister of Industry and Commerce
- In office 19 January 2015 – 13 December 2017
- President: Filipe Nyusi
- Prime Minister: Carlos Agostinho do Rosário
- Preceded by: Armando Inronga
- Succeeded by: Ragendra de Sousa

Personal details
- Born: Ernesto Max Elias Tonela; 14 October 1968 (age 57) Beira, Portuguese Mozambique
- Party: FRELIMO
- Education: Eduardo Mondlane University; French International Training Centre for DC; University of Paris I
- Profession: Economist; Politician

Ernesto Max Elias Tonela (born 14 October 1968) is a Mozambican economist and politician who has been the Minister of Economy and Finance since March 2022. A member of FRELIMO, he had previously served as Minister of Industry and Commerce from January 2015 to December 2017 and as Minister of Mineral Resources and Energy from December 2017 to March 2022.

== Early life and education ==
Tonela was born on 14 October 1968 in the city of Beira. In 1994, he graduated from the Faculty of Economics of the Eduardo Mondlane University (UEM) with a degree in Business Management. Tonela achieved a Diploma in Corporate Management and Finance from the French International Training Centre for DC in 2002. In 2003, he graduated from the Institute of Business Administration of the University of Paris I with a Master of Financial Management.

== Professional career ==
Tonela was the contact point of The Ford Foundation in Maputo from 1990 to 1992, acting as a link between the regional office in Harare and the organisation in Mozambique. He filled in as a junior economist in the Department of Economic and Statistical Studies at the Bank of Mozambique, the central bank in the country between 1991 and 1992. Tonela worked for the Planning and Control Division of the Economics and Finance Directorate of Electricidade de Moçambique from 1993 to 1997. He participated in the structuring negotiation of contracts for the MOTRACO project between 1997 and 1999 and later worked as the Chairman of the Fiscal Council of MOTRACO and SARL from 1999 to 2008 while serving as Director of Economy and Finance of Electricidade de Moçambique from 1997 to 2007.

He worked on the financial review of Electricidade de Moçambique from 1997 to 2004. Tonela coordinated the process for the sale of electricity between 2000 and 2001 and coordinated the reorganisation of the state-owned company from 2001 to 2002. From 2003 to 2005, Tonela was involved with the restructuring project of EDM with the consultancy of KPMG.

Tonela was the Executive Director of Hidroeléctrica de Cahora Bassa from 2007 to 2015.

== Cabinet minister ==
On 19 January 2015, Tonela was appointed Minister of Industry and Commerce by the newly elected president Filipe Nyusi. He served in the position until his appointment as Minister of Mineral Resources and Energy in December 2017. He replaced Leticia Klemens, who was only appointed to the post in October 2016.

Following Nyusi's re-election in the 2019 presidential election, he announced his new cabinet in January 2020, in which he kept Tonela as Minister of Mineral Resources and Energy.

In a major cabinet reshuffle on 2 March 2022, Nyusi removed Tonela and five other ministers from their positions without giving reasons for their dismissal. The following day, Tonela was appointed the Minister of Economy and Finance, replacing Adriano Maleiane, who became the new Prime Minister.

== Other activities ==
- International Monetary Fund (IMF), Ex-Officio Member of the Board of Governors (since 2022)
- Islamic Development Bank (IsDB), Ex-Officio Member of the Board of Governors (since 2022)

== Personal life ==
Tonela is married. He speaks English and Portuguese.
