= 2020 in Mozambique =

- Decades: 2000s; 2010s; 2020s
- See also: Other events of 2020; Timeline of Mozambican history

This article lists events from the year 2020 in Mozambique.

== Incumbents ==
- President: Filipe Nyusi
- Prime Minister: Carlos Agostinho do Rosário

== Events ==
=== March ===
- 22 March – First case of the COVID-19 pandemic in Mozambique.

=== April ===
- 28 April – Minister of the Interior Amade Miquidade stated that Mozambique security forces had killed 129 insurgents in Cabo Delgado, in retaliation for an attack on Xitaxi, Muidumbe District that left 52 villagers dead. The militants were reportedly killed in Muidumbe, the Quirimbas Islands, and Ibo.

=== August ===
- 7 August – The Mozambique Defence Armed Forces lost control of the villages of Awasse, Anga, and Ntotwe, near Mocímboa da Praia.
- 12 August – Militants with Islamic State, Central Africa Province (ISCAP), an organization associated with the Islamic State of Iraq and the Levant, captured the town of Mocímboa da Praia in a battle that left at last 55 government soldiers dead.

=== November—December ===
- 11 November – More than 50 people are beheaded by Islamic State of Iraq and Syria (ISIS) militants in Cabo Delgado Province.
- 11 December – Portuguese Defence Minister Joao Gomes Cravinho says his country will work with Mozambique security forces to fight insurgency starting January 2021 in Mozambique.
- 18 December – The United Nations High Commissioner for Refugees (UNHCR) reports that attacks from armed groups in Cabo Delgado, Nampula, Zambezia and Niassa have displaced more than 530,000 people. A majority have sought shelter in the southern districts of Cabo Delgado, while the UN has launched a $254 million humanitarian appeal.
- 29 December – Members of the jihadist group Al-Shabab attack the village of Monjane, Cabo Delgado Province. No reports of casualties are available.

== See also ==
- 2020–21 South-West Indian Ocean cyclone season
- COVID-19 pandemic in Mozambique
- COVID-19 pandemic in Africa
- 2020 in East Africa
- 2020 in South Africa
- 2020 in Tanzania
- 2020 in Zambia
- 2020 in Zimbabwe
- 2020 in Southern Africa

== Deaths ==
- October 11 – Stelio Craveirinha, 70, Olympic long jumper (1980).
- October 13 – Augusto Matine, 73, Mozambican-born Portuguese football player (Benfica, Vitória Setúbal, national team) and manager.
