= 2022 in Mozambique =

- Decades: 2000s; 2010s; 2020s
- See also: Other events of 2022; Timeline of Mozambican history

This article lists events from the year 2022 in Mozambique.

== Incumbents ==
- President: Filipe Nyusi
- Prime Minister: Carlos Agostinho do Rosário

== Events ==
Ongoing – COVID-19 pandemic in Mozambique

- January 3 – President Filipe Nyusi and his wife Isaura test positive for COVID-19.
- March 13 – Around 12 people in Mozambique are dead after Tropical Cyclone Gombe struck the Nampula and Zambezia provinces.
- March 24 – The World Health Organization announces that a polio vaccination campaign will begin in Malawi, Mozambique, Tanzania, and Zambia.
- March 25 - The death toll of the Tropical Cyclone Gombe rises to 63, with a further 108 people injured and 736,015 affected. In total, 12 water systems, 69 health centres 2764 electricity poles, 1458 classrooms affecting up to 144,000 students and 141,854 houses were either partially or fully destroyed, while 1,008km of roads were damaged and 91,117 hectares of agricultural crops were lost.
- April 13 – South Africa says that it is extending its participation in a multinational counter-insurgent coalition in Mozambique.
- May 18 – Mozambique confirms its first polio case in 30 years in the northwestern province of Tete.
- May 19 – A case of wild poliovirus is recorded in Mozambique for the first time since 1992.
- September 6 –
  - Six people are killed and three others are kidnapped as Islamists insurgents raid the districts of Erati and Memba, Mozambique, torching dozens of houses. Six attackers are arrested.
  - Gunmen storm the Comboni Missionary Sisters' church in Chipene, Mozambique, killing an Italian nun and setting ablaze the church, the nuns' homes and the hospital. Two other nuns and two priests escaped.
- October 6 – Mozambique reports its first case of monkeypox.

== See also ==
- 2021–22 South-West Indian Ocean cyclone season
- 2022–23 South-West Indian Ocean cyclone season
- COVID-19 pandemic in Africa
- Islamic State of Iraq and the Levant
- Al-Shabaab (militant group)
