= 2017 in Mozambique =

- Decades: 1990s; 2000s; 2010s; 2020s
- See also: Other events of 2017; Timeline of Mozambican history

This article lists events from the year 2017 in Mozambique.

== Incumbents ==
- President: Filipe Nyusi
- Prime Minister: Carlos Agostinho do Rosário

== Events ==
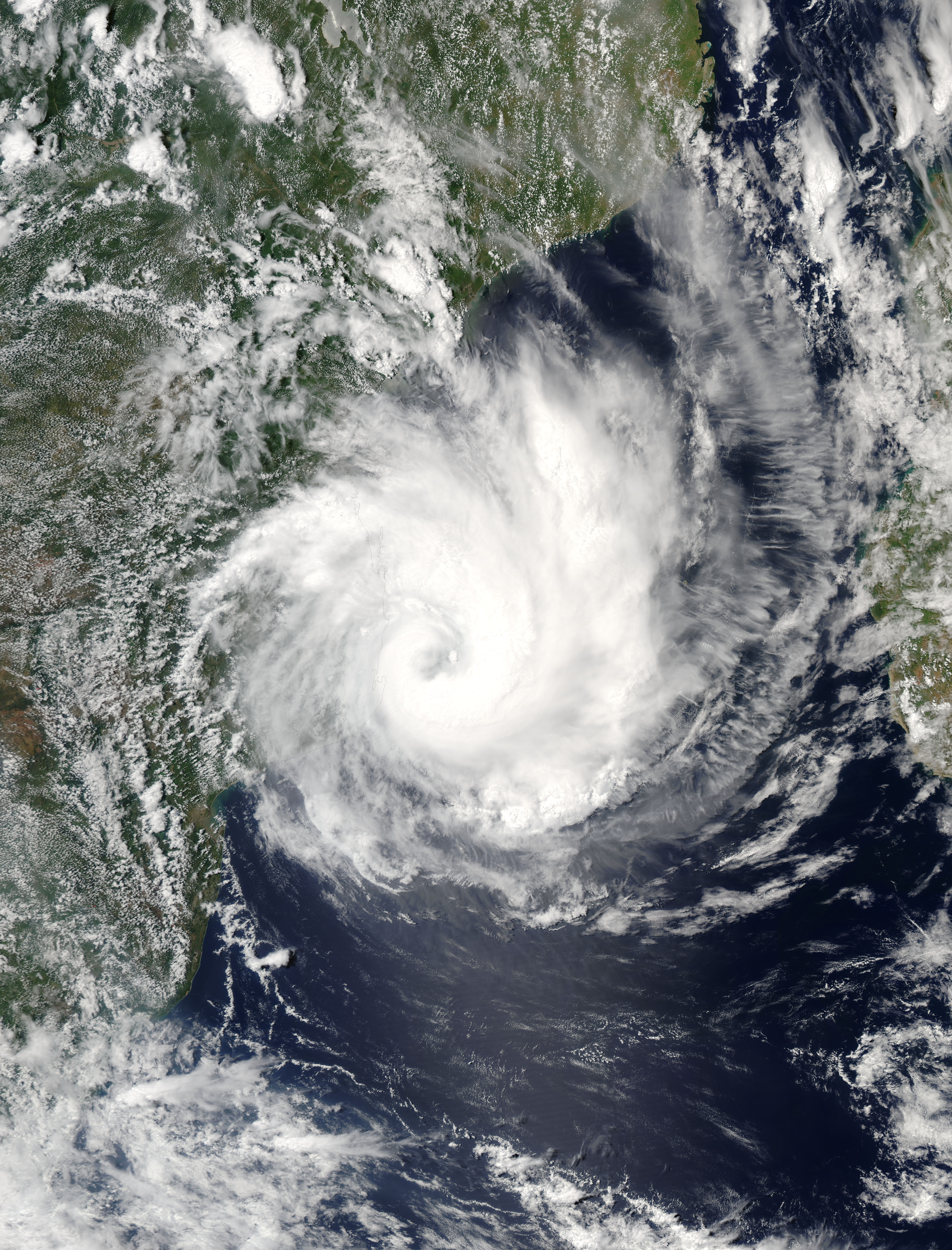
Satellite image of the tropical cyclone Dineo hitting the coast of Mozambique on 15 February.

- 15 February – The tropical cyclone Dineo struck the coast of Mozambique. At least seven people were killed across the country, and an estimated 20,000 homes were destroyed and approximately 130,000 people were directly affected. Dineo was the first tropical cyclone to hit Mozambique since Cyclone Jokwe in 2008.
- The 2017 Lusophony Games will be hosted in Maputo

== Links ==
Media related to 2017 in Mozambique at Wikimedia Commons
