= 2023 in Mozambique =

- Decades: 2000s; 2010s; 2020s
- See also: Other events of 2023; Timeline of Mozambican history

This article lists events from the year 2023 in Mozambique.

== Incumbents ==
- President: Filipe Nyusi
- Prime Minister: Adriano Maleiane

== Events ==
Ongoing – COVID-19 pandemic in Mozambique

=== February ===
- February 10 – Mozambican civil society groups meet in Inhambane to discuss a government draft law on nonprofit organizations, which would regulate NGO operations and counter money laundering and terrorist financing.

=== March ===
- March 9 – Mozambican rapper Edson da Luz, known as Azagaia, dies from complications of a sudden illness.
- March 11 – Cyclone Freddy hits Mozambique, causing floods, infrastructure damage, and at least five deaths.
- March 14 – Azagaia’s funeral procession in Maputo attracts thousands of fans and family members. Police block access near the president’s official residence and use teargas to disperse the crowd after they refuse to change course.

=== April ===
- April 26 – Mozambique’s government legalizes a local militia to fight an Islamic State-linked insurgent group in the north.

=== June ===
- Mozambique is added to the FATF “grey list” for deficiencies in anti-money laundering and counterterrorism financing policies.

=== August ===
- August 14 – The Southern African Development Community (SADC) leaders meet in Luanda, Angola, to discuss their military mission in the Cabo Delgado region.

=== October ===
- October 11 – 2023 Mozambican local elections.
- October 12 – Supporters of RENAMO celebrate preliminary results in Maputo and other cities. Clashes with police occur in Nampula, Cuamba, Moatize, and Vilankulos, resulting in at least one death and use of tear gas.
- October 13 – RENAMO mayoral candidate Manuel de Araujo is briefly detained in Quelimane while visiting polling stations; he is released hours later without charges.
- October 27 – Protests in Maputo and Nampula erupt over the disputed local elections, leaving at least three dead and several injured after clashes with police.

=== December ===
- João Chamusse, editor of the Ponto por Ponto newspaper, is found dead outside his home in Katembe after covering government corruption.

== See also ==
- 2022–23 South-West Indian Ocean cyclone season
- COVID-19 pandemic in Africa
- Islamic State of Iraq and the Levant
- Al-Shabaab (militant group)
