= 2011 in Mozambique =

- Decades: 1990s; 2000s; 2010s; 2020s
- See also: Other events of 2011; Timeline of Mozambican history

Events in the year 2011 in Mozambique.

== Incumbents ==
- President: Armando Guebuza
- Prime Minister: Aires Ali

== Events ==
- Mozambique's corn production dramatically dropped

== Arts and entertainment ==
The first showing of Pinocchio in Mozambique was shown in the Camblo Del Oro Theatre.

== Sports ==
- Mozambique hosted the 2011 All-Africa Games from September 3 to September 18.

== Deaths ==
- January 5 - Malangatana Ngwenya, painter
