= Paulo Zucula =

Mozambican politician (born 1955)

Minister of Transport and Communication
- Incumbent
- Assumed office March 11, 2008
- Preceded by: Antonio Munguambe

Personal details
- Born: 1955 (age 70–71)

Paulo Zucula (born 1955) is a Mozambican politician and Mozambique's Minister of Transportation and Communication since March 2008.

== Biography ==
=== Early life ===
Born in 1955, Zucula studied agronomy at the Eduardo Mondlane University in Maputo, where he completed a B.Sc. degree. He pursued graduate studies at the University of Minnesota, receiving a M.Sc. degree.

=== Career ===
From 1990 to 1992, Zucula served as Deputy Minister of Agriculture for President Joaquim Chissano. Thereafter, from 1993 to 1995, he was a National Programme Manager for the Food and Agriculture Organization of the United Nations. In 2001, he became coordinator of the Regional Spatial Development Initiative of the Development Bank of Southern Africa. From 2004 to 2005, he held the post of Chief Executive Officer of the Foundation for Community Development (Portuguese: Fundação Para o Desenvolvimento Comunitário).

Zucula re-entered public service in December 2006, becoming director of the National Disasters Management Institute (Portuguese: Instituto Nacional de Gestão de Calamidades, INGC), Mozambique's disaster management agency. He was "widely praised" for his handling of the 2007 Mozambican flood and for his leadership of the INGC, with one "senior [United Nations] official" describing him as "the most effective director in this position that I have come across in 25 years of disaster management anywhere in the world". He was appointed Minister of Transport and Communication by Armando Guebuza on March 11, 2008, succeeding Antonio Munguambe. Zucula's appointment came as part of a cabinet reshuffle that also involved the replacement of foreign minister Alcinda Abreu and justice minister Esperança Machavela.
