= António Munguambe =

Mozambican politician

Antonio Munguambe

Minister of Transport and Communication
- In office February 3, 2005 – March 10, 2008
- Succeeded by: Paulo Zucula

Antonio Francisco Munguambe is a Mozambican politician.

Munguambe served as Deputy Minister of Trade in the early 1990s, and was appointed as Minister of Transport and Communication by President Armando Guebuza on February 3, 2005, when Guebuza named his new government shortly after taking office. He was removed from office (along with foreign minister Alcinda Abreu and justice minister Esperança Machavela) on March 10, 2008, and was succeeded by Paulo Zucula, the former director of Mozambique's National Disasters Management Institute.

Although Guebuza offered no official reason for Munguambe's dismissal from office, various news reports suggested that it was tied to the transportation-related riots in Maputo in February that caused between four and six deaths. The riots were sparked by increases of up to 50 percent in the fares for the chapas (privately owned minibus taxis) that account for a significant portion of the capital's passenger transport. According to the Mozambique Workers' Organization, the country's largest national trade union centre, Mozambican workers spend an average of 35 percent of their income on transportation.

The hike was negotiated by Munguambe and the Federation of Road Transport Associations following an increase in the fuel costs (the government raised the price of diesel by 14 percent on January 23). After the outbreak of rioting on February 5, Munguambe declared that "[t]he increase is fair and also the complaints by commuters are fair", and promised to renegotiate with transport operators. On February 6, the government rescinded the fares increase, and in exchange promised to provide fuel subsidies to licensed transport operators, so that they could in effect purchase diesel at the price prior to January 23 (31.0 meticais per litre, as opposed to 35.35 per litre).

Munguambe was imprisoned in 2010 for his part in embezzling $1.7 million from state-owned airports company Aeroportos de Moçambique. His original sentence of 20 years was cut to 8 years on appeal, of which he served half, and was freed in 2013.
