= Sani Yaya =

Togolese finance minister

- Education: DES in Management – Paris 1 Panthéon-Sorbonne University; Master of Economics –University of Lomé; Graduate – Centre for Financial, Economic and Banking Studies (CEFEB), Paris
- Alma mater: Paris 1 Panthéon-Sorbonne University; University of Lomé; Centre for Financial, Economic and Banking Studies (CEFEB)
- Occupations: Politician, economist
- Years active: 2000s–present
- Known for: Financial policy and economic management in Togo
- Office: Minister of Economy and Finance of Togo
- Predecessor: Adji Otèth Ayassor

Sani Yaya is a Togolese politician who has been serving as Minister of Finance in the governments of Prime Ministers Komi Sélom Klassou and Victoire Tomegah Dogbé since August 1, 2016.

== Early life and education ==
A graduate of Center for Financial, Economic and Banking Studies (CEFEB) in Paris, Yaya holds a DES in Management from Paris 1 Panthéon-Sorbonne University and a Master of Economics from the University of Lomé.

== Career ==
Yaya's professional experience include six years at the Central Bank of West African States (BCEAO) and its Banking Commission of the West African Economic and Monetary Union as well as nearly six years within Ecobank (ETI), where he served as Director of Audit and Compliance. He was also a member of the Executive Committee of the Group. He also held the senior positions of Chief Operating Officer (COO) of the NSIA Group, specialized in insurance and banking, and member, of the Group's Executive Committee.

Prior to his appointment as Minister of Economy and Finance, Yaya served as Deputy Minister for the Budget.

== Other activities ==
- African Development Bank (AfDB), Ex-Officio Member of the Board of Governors (since 2016)
- ECOWAS Bank for Investment and Development (EBID), Ex-Officio Member of the Board of Governors (since 2016)
- International Monetary Fund (IMF), Ex-Officio Member of the Board of Governors (since 2016)
- Islamic Development Bank (IsDB), Ex-Officio Member of the Board of Governors (since 2016)
