= List of ambassadors of Mozambique to China =

Coordinates: 39.945526°N 116.451219°E

Ambassador of Mozambique to the People's Republic of China
- Incumbent; Manuel José Gonçalves since 2026
- Inaugural holder: Lopes Tembe Ndlane
- Formation: December 16, 1983

The Mozambican ambassador in Beijing is the official representative of the Government in Maputo to the Government of the People's Republic of China. The current ambassador is Manuel José Gonçalves, who has appointed by president Daniel Chapo on January 2026.

== List of representatives ==
Diplomatic agrément/Diplomatic accreditation	ambassador	Observations	List of heads of state of Mozambique	Premier of the People's Republic of China	Term end
December 16, 1983	Lopes Tembe Ndlane		Samora Machel	Zhao Ziyang	
September 29, 1989	Daniel Saul Mbanza		Joaquim Alberto Chissano	Li Peng	1994
June 23, 1996	José Maria da Silva Vieira de Morais	Gose Mollais	Joaquim Alberto Chissano	Li Peng	2003
August 4, 2003	António Inácio Júnior		Joaquim Alberto Chissano	Wen Jiabao	July 31, 2015
September 14, 2016	Aires Ali	Aires Bonifácio Baptista Ali	Filipe Nyusi	Li Keqiang	
March 15, 2018	Maria Gustava		Filipe Nyusi		2025
January 2026	Manuel José Gonçalves		Daniel Chapo		
