= 2018 in Mozambique =

- Decades: 1990s; 2000s; 2010s; 2020s
- See also: Other events of 2018; Timeline of Mozambican history

Events in the year 2018 in Mozambique.

== Incumbents ==
- President: Filipe Nyusi
- Prime Minister: Carlos Agostinho do Rosário

== Events ==
- Since 2017 – Ongoing conflict in the Cabo Delgado Province, between Islamist militant group Ansar al-Sunna and Mozambican security forces

=== Sports ===
- 29 July to 5 August – Mozambique will host the 2018 FIBA Under-18 Women's African Championship

== Deaths ==
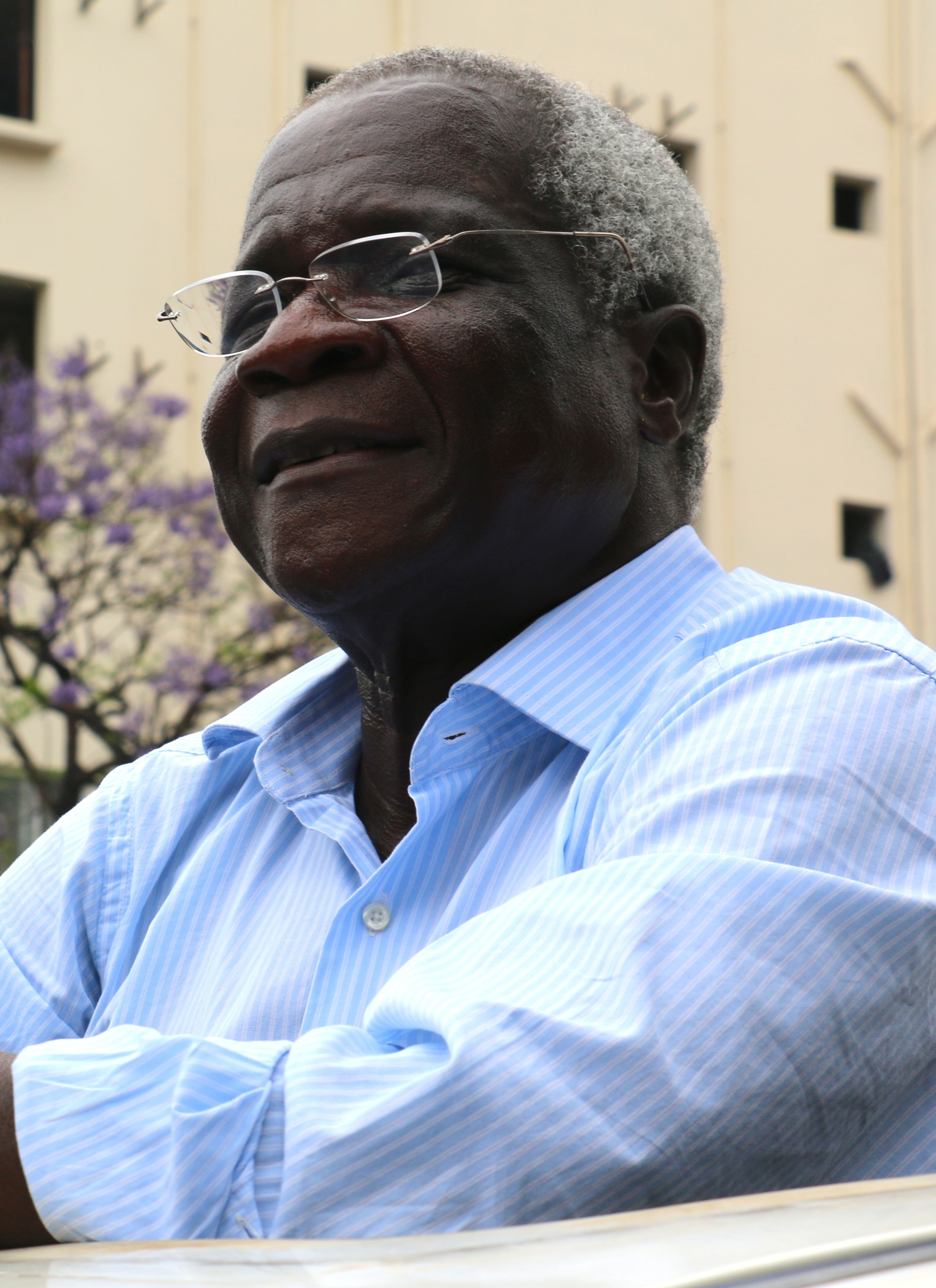
Afonso Dhlakama

- 3 May – Afonso Dhlakama, politician, leader of RENAMO (b. 1953).
