= 2019 in Mozambique =

- Decades: 1990s; 2000s; 2010s; 2020s
- See also: Other events of 2019; Timeline of Mozambican history

This article lists events from the year 2019 in Mozambique.

== Incumbents ==
- President: Filipe Nyusi
- Prime Minister: Carlos Agostinho do Rosário

== Events. ==
- March 15 – Cyclone Idai makes landfall on Mozambique, causing at least 1,073 fatalities, as well as mass flooding and power outages in southern Africa.
- 15 October: Mozambique, President and Parliament

== Links ==
Media related to 2019 in Mozambique at Wikimedia Commons
