= Tomaz Salomão =

Mozambican politician and economist

Dr Tomaz Salomão
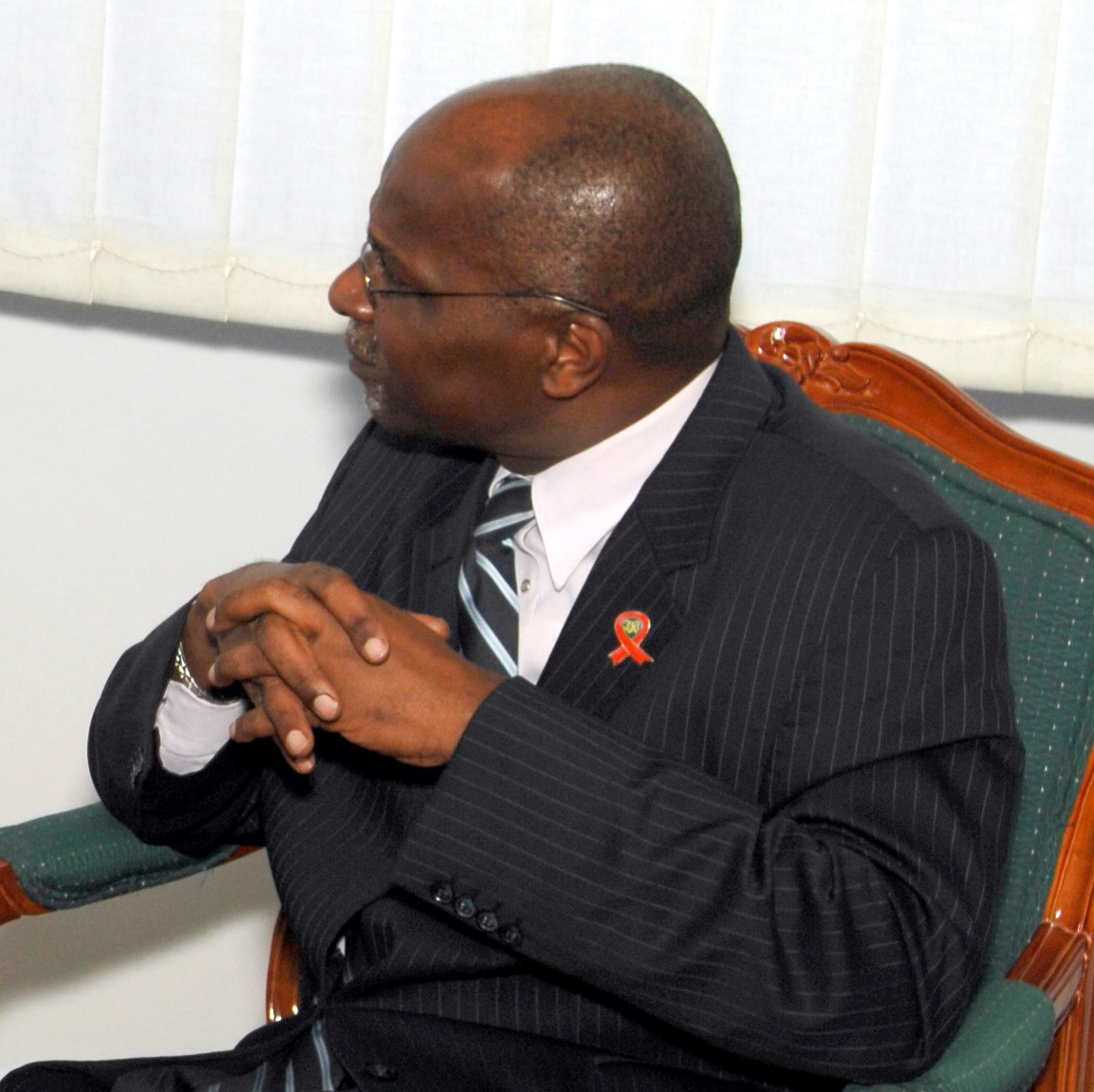

3rd Executive Secretary of SADC
- In office August 2005 – September 2013
- Preceded by: Prega Ramsamy
- Succeeded by: Stergomena Tax

Minister of Economy and Finance
- In office 1994–2000
- Preceded by: Eneas Comiche
- Succeeded by: Luísa Diogo

Personal details
- Born: 16 October 1954 (age 71) Inharrime, Portuguese Mozambique

Tomaz Salomão (born 16 October 1954) is a Mozambican politician and economist. He was Minister of Economy and Finance from 1994 to 2000. He served as the third Executive Secretary of the Southern African Development Community (SADC). Salomão was appointed at the 2005 Summit of Heads of State and Government of the Southern African Development Community in Gaborone, Botswana. He earned his doctorate at Johns Hopkins University in Baltimore, Maryland, United States.

Opponents of President Robert Mugabe of Zimbabwe have criticized Salomão for his assessment of Zimbabwean elections as free and fair. Salomão said that SADC would pull out of an EU summit to be held in Lisbon in December 2007 if Zimbabwe was on the agenda. "SADC will not go to Lisbon to discuss Zimbabwe because the summit is not about Zimbabwe, but about relations between the EU and Africa," he said.
