= Luísa Diogo =

Prime Minister of Mozambique from 2004 to 2010

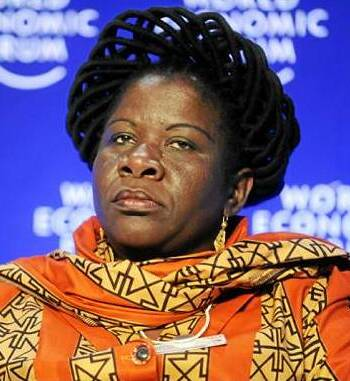
- Diogo in 2009

3rd Prime Minister of Mozambique
- In office 17 February 2004 – 16 January 2010
- President: Joaquim Chissano; Armando Guebuza
- Preceded by: Pascoal Mocumbi
- Succeeded by: Aires Ali

Minister of Planning and Finance
- In office 2000–2005
- Preceded by: Tomaz Salomão
- Succeeded by: Manuel Chang

Personal details
- Born: 11 April 1958 Magoé District, Tete Province, Portuguese Mozambique
- Died: 16 January 2026 (aged 67) Portugal
- Party: FRELIMO
- Education: Eduardo Mondlane University; University of London

Luísa Dias Diogo (11 April 1958 – 16 January 2026) was a Mozambican economist and politician who served as Prime Minister of Mozambique from 2004 to 2010. She also served as Minister of Planning and Finance between 2000 and 2005. Diogo was the first female prime minister of Mozambique and her term in office was notable for the economic reforms that brought financial stability to the country and women empowerment.

== Early life ==
Diogo was born on 11 April 1958 in Magoé District, Tete Province, Portuguese Mozambique as the daughter of a nurse and a housewife. She went to a school in Tete, studied accounting at the Commercial Institute until 1979 and got a bachelor's degree in economics from the Eduardo Mondlane University in 1983 and a master's degree in financial economics at the School of Oriental and African Studies of the University of London in 1992.

== Career ==
Diogo joined the Ministry of Finance's Department of Economic Sectors and Investment as a technical officer in 1980, and in 1984 she became deputy head of the department. She became its national budget director in 1989, and until 1992. She subsequently worked for the Mozambican office of the World Bank as programme officer, between 1993 and 1994.

In 1994 President Joaquim Chissano appointed Diogo as Deputy Minister of Finance, an office in which she drafted and executed government's development plan. She became Minister of Planning and Finance in 2000, an office she held until 2005.

In 2003, United Nations Secretary-General Kofi Annan appointed Diogo to the United Nations Commission on the Private Sector and Development, which was co-chaired by Prime Minister Paul Martin of Canada and President Ernesto Zedillo of Mexico.

=== Prime Minister (2004–10) ===
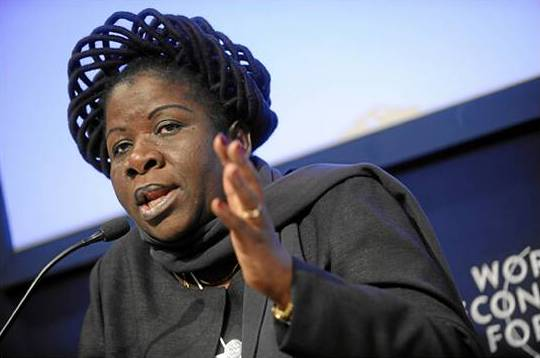
Prime Minister Diogo at World Economic Forum, January 2009

President Joaquim Chissano appointed Diogo as the first female Prime Minister of Mozambique on 17 February 2004, succeeding Pascoal Mocumbi. She remained as Minister of Economy and Finance until 2005. Before completing her first year in office, Diogo presented a social economic plan to improve the country's finances, which were burdened by significant debt.

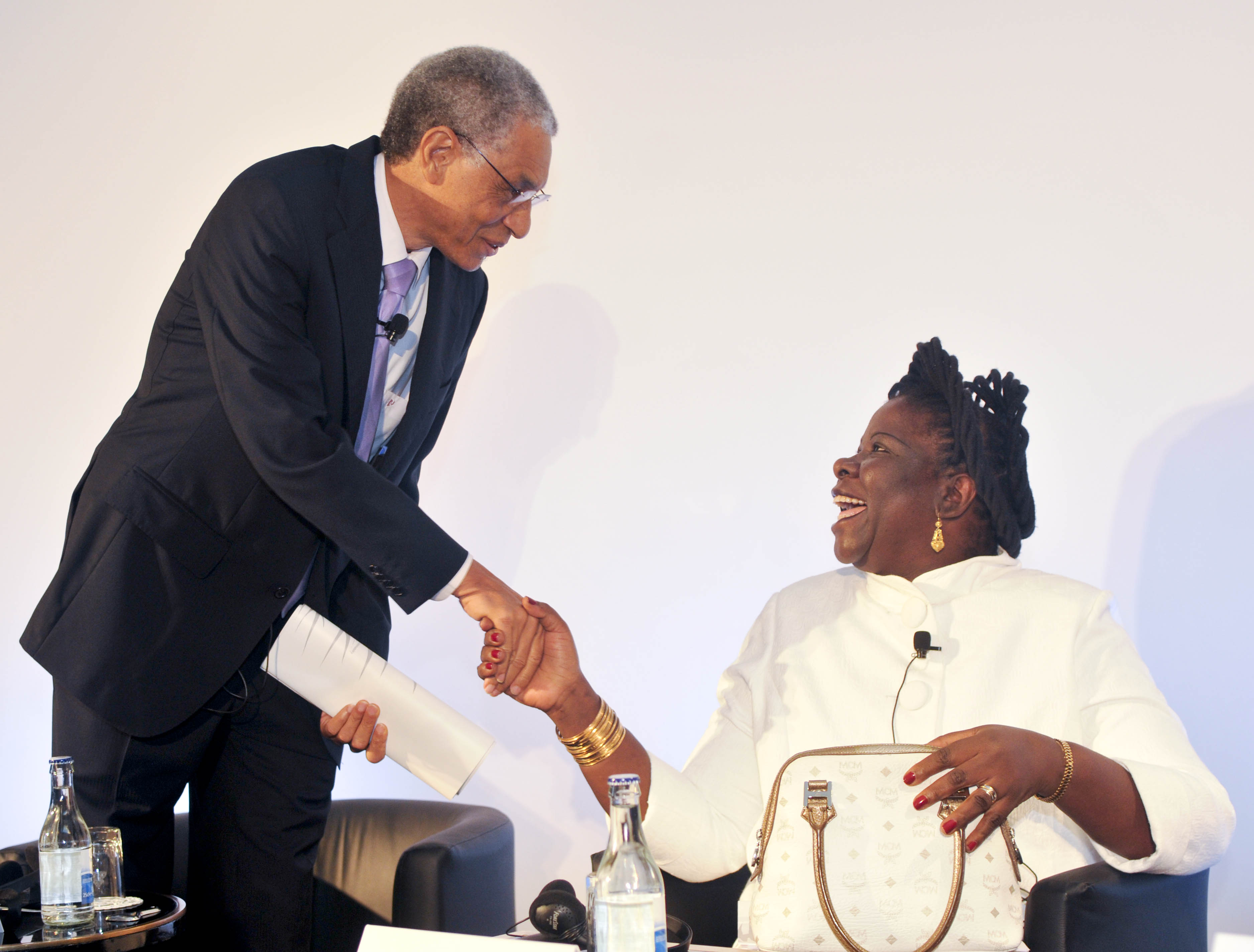
Prime Minister Diogo with Cabo Verdean official Adao Rocha, November 2009

Newly elected President Armando Guebuza trusted Diogo to be the prime minister in his first term in February 2005. Kofi Annan, in 2006, appointed Diogo to co-chair – alongside Shaukat Aziz and Jens Stoltenberg – a High-level Panel on United Nations Systemwide Coherence, which was set up to explore how the United Nations system could work more coherently and effectively across the world in the areas of development, humanitarian assistance and the environment.

After reports that some farmers were refusing to leave their livestock in areas threatened by the 2007 Mozambican flood, Diogo ordered forcible evacuations of citizens in low-lying areas of the Zambezi valley. She was also a member of the Commission on Effective Development Cooperation with Africa which was set up by the Danish Prime Minister Anders Fogh Rasmussen and held meetings between April and October 2008.

During her time in office, Diogo urged the African health ministers to offer reproductive and sexual health services free of charge throughout the continent. These services could reduce infant mortality by two thirds, reduce maternal mortality by three quarters, reverse the spread of AIDS, and promote gender equality and the empowerment of women. The target set by the UN was to achieve these goals by 2015.

Diogo also focused on gender equality and women's empowerment through a recently launched "Network of Women Ministers and Parliamentarians" (MUNIPA). The MUNIPA network aims to strengthen advocacy and lobbying activities so that policies and legislation are adopted favourable to gender equity and women's empowerment. Promoting equality between men and women is a central concern of the Mozambican government, which has been adopting instruments to promote women's empowerment at all levels [of government]. She appeared twice in the Forbes list of the World's 100 Most Powerful Women: in 2006 and in 2008.

She was succeeded as prime minister on 16 January 2010 by Aires Ali. Her term in office was notable for the economic reforms that brought financial stability to the country, debt relief and women empowerment.

== Life after politics ==
In July 2010, Diogo was named adviser to the African Union Commission on matters relating to peace and security. The following month, UN Secretary-General Ban Ki-moon appointed Diogo to the High-Level Panel on Global Sustainability, which was co-chaired by presidents Tarja Halonen of Finland and Jacob Zuma of South Africa. She became chairwoman of the Absa Bank Mozambique in 2012. She published her memoirs under the title At Dawn's Soup ("A Sopa da Madrugada") in 2013.

Between 2014 and 2017 Diogo was the chairwoman of the African Union Panel of the Wise, becoming the first woman to hold the office. She was also member of the Panel of the Strategy of the African Development Bank.

Amid the 2014 Mozambican general election, Diogo submitted in February her candidacy to become FRELIMO candidate to president. Diogo came second before Filipe Nyusi in the party internal election. At the time, she was backed by a party faction led by Chissano.

In 2016, Diogo was appointed by Erik Solheim, the Chairman of the Development Assistance Committee, to serve on the High Level Panel on the Future of the Development Assistance Committee under the leadership of Mary Robinson. She was appointed president of the Beluluane Industrial Park in 2018.

=== Non-profit positions ===
- African Union Foundation, Member of the Council
- Brenthurst Foundation, Member of the Advisory Board
- Club de Madrid, Member
- Council of Women World Leaders, Member
- NOVAFRICA of the Universidade Nova de Lisboa, Member of the Advisory Board

== Personal life ==
She married Portuguese citizen Antonio Albano Silva in 1981. In 2008, a debate arose regarding her nationality, as she had allegedly lost her Mozambican nationality by marrying a Portuguese citizen. In a 2010 op-ed in The New York Times, Irish musician and activist Bono described Diogo as having "the lioness energy of an Ellen Johnson Sirleaf, a Ngozi Okonjo-Iweala or a Graça Machel."

=== Death ===
Diogo died on 16 January 2026, at the age of 67, in a hospital in Portugal after suffering from an undisclosed illness. President Daniel Chapo highlighted her "dedication to public service", while former President Guebuza stated that "her life in the service of the country, with dedication and competence, earned her recognition and respect in our ranks". The Portuguese president Marcelo Rebelo de Sousa also mourned her passing and highlighted her "advocacy for the promotion and protection of women's rights, having, whenever possible, supported initiatives that contributed to a more balanced participation of women in the economic, political, social and cultural life of her country". On 20 January, the government declared two days of national mourning following the funeral scheduled for 23 January.

== Publications ==
- Diogo, Luisa (March 2006). "Post-conflict Mozambique's Reconstruction: A Transferable Strategy in Africa" (in English); French version also available. Africa Region findings no. 260. Washington, D.C.: World Bank.

Political offices
| Preceded by Pascoal Mocumbi | Prime Minister of Mozambique; 2004–2010 | Succeeded by Aires Ali |
