= National Disasters Management Institute =

Disaster relief agency of Mozambique

- Instituto Nacional de Gestão de Calamidades

Agency overview
- Formed: 1999
- Jurisdiction: Mozambique
- Agency executive: Joao Ribeiro, Director
- Parent agency: Ministry of State Administration
- Website: http://www.ingc.gov.mz/

The National Disasters Management Institute (Portuguese: Instituto Nacional de Gestão de Calamidades, INGC) is the disaster relief agency of Mozambique.

== History ==
The INGC was formed in 1999 by Government decree no. 37 and operates under the Ministry of State Administration (MAE). Prior to its creation, disaster management in Mozambique was under the purview of the Department for the Prevention and Combat of Natural Disasters (Portuguese: Departamento de Prevenção e Combate as Calamidades Naturais, DPCCN), a subunit of the Ministry of Foreign Affairs and Cooperation that mainly served as a "distributing agency for external aid". In contrast to its predecessor, the INGC was geared more toward coordination of disaster management efforts than delivery of foreign aid.

As of March 10, 2008, Joao Ribeiro was the director of the INGC. He was formerly the institute's deputy director and replaced Paulo Zucula, who was "widely praised" for his leadership of the INGC, when Zucula was appointed Minister of Transport and Communication.

== Activities ==
The INGC is responsible for conducting mitigation efforts (such as collection and analysis of data), undertaking preparedness measures (e.g. awareness campaigns), and coordinating disaster response (including distribution of food, tents, and other supplies). Since June 2008 it is also responsible, through the Reconstruction Coordination Office (GACOR), for the resettlement of persons displaced by natural disasters. The INGC prepares for and responds to both natural disasters, such as droughts, floods, and tropical cyclones—the three natural hazards to which Mozambique is most vulnerable—and man-made disasters, such as the 2008 South Africa riots.

The INGC coordinates disaster management efforts with and receives support from public and private institutions, non-governmental organisations, and international organisations, including Concern Worldwide, the government of Germany, and the United Nations. Ad Melkert, the Associate Administrator of the United Nations Development Programme, which provides assistance to the INGC through its Bureau for Crisis Prevention and Recovery, lauded the institute in March 2008 as "an example of effective management of natural disasters". It received "unanimous" praise from international organisations for its response to the 2007 Mozambican flood.
