= Sinking of the Zico =

Ferry boat sinking

- Date: 7 April 2024
- Location: Off the coast of Mozambique
- Type: Boat sinking
- Deaths: ~100
- Injuries: 2
- Missing: ~20

The makeshift ferry Zico sank on April 7, 2024, between the Mozambique Channel and Mossuril Bay, off the coast of northern Mozambique. Over 100 of the 130 passengers on the overloaded vessel died.

== Background ==
Mozambique and other neighboring African countries such as Zimbabwe and Malawi had uncontained cholera outbreaks in the months preceding the disaster. Since October 2023, the country has recorded about 15,000 cases of cholera and 32 deaths due to the disease.

Many parts of the country are only accessible by boats, and the country has a poor road network and many parts are inaccessible by air. The disaster occurred despite recent pressure on ferry operators to improve safety. There is little oversight for the thousands of ferries operating in Mozambique and less deadly incidents are not uncommon.

== Incident ==
The Mozambican vessel Zico, a fishing boat converted for use as a ferry, was traveling from Lunga in Mossuril District, Nampula Province to the Island of Mozambique on 7 April 2024. Most of the 130–150 passengers were trying to escape the mainland because of a cholera outbreak, with Nampula being one of the worst-affected provinces. Others were travelling to attend a fair on the island. Surviving crewmember Menque Amade said that he requested that the crew chief increase the boat's speed once he saw that the boat was adrift.

A survivor claimed that the vessel was overcrowded and began to take on water because of the number of people leading to passengers panicking and jumping off the vessel into the sea. The vessel sank off the coast of northern Mozambique between the Mozambique Channel and Mossuril Bay and was later dragged to shore.

Over 100 people were killed, including many children. There were 12 survivors, according to provincial officials and as of 9 April 2024, around 20 people were still missing.

== Aftermath ==
Bodies washed up on the beach, and some were quickly buried in line with Islamic rites.

Authorities initially blamed the sinking on overcrowding but later said the boat sank after taking on water. Early reports also suggested that the boat had been struck by a tidal wave. Nampula province's Secretary of State Jaime Neto said that misinformation about cholera caused people to panic and board the boat. A Maritime Transport Institute official indicated that the boat was not licensed to transport passengers. President Filipe Nyusi ordered an investigation headed by the transport minister, Mateus Magala. A period of national mourning was observed from 10 to 12 April.
