= Calane da Silva =

Mozambican writer and journalist (1945–2021)

- Born: Raúl Alves Calane da Silva; 20 October 1945; Lourenço Marques, Portuguese Mozambique
- Died: 29 January 2021 (aged 75); Maputo, Mozambique
- Occupations: Writer; Journalist

Raúl Alves Calane da Silva (20 October 1945 – 29 January 2021) was a Mozambican writer, journalist, and poet.

== Biography ==
Da Silva was born in Laurenço Marques (today Maputo) to a Portuguese father and a Ronga mother. In his most popular work, Dos Meninos da Malanga, he detailed memories of living as a black teenager in the high-crime suburbs of Maputo.

As a student, da Silva followed the ideals of the Núcleo de Estudantes Secundários Africanos de Moçambique, a Mozambican nationalist movement founded by Eduardo Mondlane in 1949, although he never joined it. He served in the Portuguese Army from 1965 to 1968 in Nampula. He began working for the newspaper Notícias and Tempo. He founded organizations such as Tchova Xi Ta Duma, a theatre troupe where he was a director and an actor, as well as the Associação dos Escritores Moçambicanos. In the 1990s, he became a professor at Maputo University. In 2003, he published a book detailing the contributions of Ronga, his native language, to the speaking of Portuguese in Mozambique. He defended a thesis at the University of Porto in 2009 titled Do lexico à possibilidade de campos isotópicos literários.

Calane da Silva died of COVID-19 in Maputo on 29 January 2021, at the age of 75, during the COVID-19 pandemic in Mozambique.

== Distinctions ==
- Prémio José Craveirinha de Literatura (2010)
- Order of Rio Branco (2011)
