= Iskandar Safa =

French businessman (1955–2024)

- Born: 3 April 1955; Beirut, Lebanon
- Died: 29 January 2024 (aged 68); Mougins, Alpes-Maritimes, France
- Education: American University of Beirut; INSEAD
- Occupation: Businessman

Iskandar Safa (Arabic: إسكندر صفا; 3 April 1955 – 29 January 2024) was a French businessman and philanthropist of Lebanese origin. In the late 1970s, Safa enrolled in the American University of Beirut, graduating with a degree in civil engineering. He left Lebanon to become a junior civil engineer in the United States, and then moved to France, where in 1982 he graduated with an MBA from INSEAD in Fontainebleau.

Together with his brother Akram Safa, he was the owner of Privinvest Holding, a major international naval construction group. In addition to this, Iskandar Safa and his brother Akram controlled, through P.I. Dev SAL, the French company FIMAS SA specialised in developing and managing real estate properties in the South of France.

Iskandar's estate was sued in London by the Republic of Mozambique in a corruption scandal known as Tuna Bonds or Hidden Debt Scandal. He was subsequently found guilty and was ordered by the High Court in London to pay back $1.9 billion, with interest, to Mozambique.

== Career ==
From 1978 to 1981, Iskandar Safa was working as a site engineer for INECC at the King Abdulaziz Military Academy project in Salbukh, Saudi Arabia near Riyadh.

In 1986, he became President of Triacorp International. On 19 January 2005, he stepped down as President of the company’s steering committee in favor of Eric Giardini.

During the 1990s, Iskandar and his brother Akram founded Privinvest, a shipbuilding company specializing in naval and commercial vessels and mega yachts.

In 1992, he was elected by the CIRI (Comité Interministériel de Restructuration Industrielle) to purchase the Constructions Mécaniques de Normandie (CMN) in Cherbourg and managed to turn around the naval construction shipyard that was facing difficulties at the time. The CMN became a French company affiliated with Privinvest Group. He was also President of the council of FIMAS Group which owns marble carriers in the town Saint-Pons-de-Thomières located in Herault, France, also called ‘Marbres de France’.

In 2007, Iskandar Safa took part in the creation of the Abu Dhabi Mar naval construction site with Al Aïn International and became executive director. Later on in 2011, Privinvest purchased Al Aïn International’s shares.

On 1 March 2018, a German consortium consisting of Thyssen Krupp and Luerssen was excluded by the German Government from the tender for the construction of the multi-purpose warship MKS 180 for the benefit of GNY (German Naval Yards), belonging to the Prinvinvest group, and the Dutch shipbuilder Damen.

May 2020 saw the announcement that the German naval yards in Kiel, owned and run by Safa's Privinvest Holding SAL group, were entering into a long-term co-operation agreement with the Lürssen shipyard company based in Bremen. The idea behind the partnership is to improve the overall German shipbuilding sector and to improve sustainability and efficiency.

=== Other roles ===
Between 2011 and 2024 Iskandar Safa was the non-executive vice-president of the Marfin Investment Group’s steering committee, a holding company listed on the Athens’ stock-exchange.

== Controversies ==
Iskandar Safa's public life saw several controversies, including an Interpol's Red Notice warrant for his arrest in 2001.

=== Negotiation of French Hostages ===
Safa was pointed out as the facilitator of contacts between the French government and Hezbollah during the Lebanon Hostage Crisis. He operated closely with Charles Pasqua and Jean-Charles Marchiani to secure their release. A subsequent investigation accused Iskandar and his brother of operating a kick-back scheme in which part of the money paid for the hostages was transferred to a Swiss bank account in their name. The money was subsequently passed on to Pasqua and Marchiani. While French authorities denied that a ransom was paid, French courts issued an arrest warrant. He subsequently reached a deal with the authorities and charges were dropped.

According to several reports, Safa was given a French passport as a reward for his services.

=== Involvement in the Saudi-led Intervention in the Yemeni Civil War ===
The International Federation for Human Rights (FIDH) has pointed out that CMN/Privinvest's was a "key-figure in the France-UAE arms alliance" as Emirati military ships were served by one of his shipyards in Abu Dhabi.

=== Death of Colonel Hugues de Samie ===
In 2012, former French Legion colonel Hugues de Samie was killed in Tripoli. Local authorities ruled that he was killed during a failed carjacking attempt by a drug user.The findings were contested by an article published by the Le Monde, asserting that a suitcase containing 3.600 Euros was found in the car. The article mentions that Samie previously worked for Safa, pitching the modernization of Libya's combat ships by CMN.

Despite leaving CMN and joining the French company Epee, he was also assessed to conduct parallel activities on behalf of Safa, often in dangerous situations, leading to some saying that he was a victim of contract killing connected to Safa. Safa denied the accusations that he endangered Samie's life and called them "a ridiculous fiction".

=== Hidden Debt Scandal ===
See Tuna bonds.

=== Alleged Mossad asset ===
In 2015, Israeli newspaper Yedioth Ahronot published an article on French journalist and diplomat Roger Auque's posthumous autobiography, in which he claims to have recruited Iskandar Safa as a Mossad asset to help in finding Israeli pilot Ron Arad.

== Media Ownership ==
In January 2019, Safa announced his intention to take over the regional newspaper Nice-Matin. In July of the same year, he withdrew from the process due to a competing bid from French billionaire, Xavier Niel, as well as opposition from the newspaper's editorial staff.

Safa also owned Valmonde which publishes the weekly Valeurs Actuelles, a conservative right-wing publication. He sought to change the public image of the magazine by firing its editor, Geoffroy Lejeune. Safa criticized the "zemmourisation" of the magazine and sought to moderate it.

In July 2019, Safa acquired a 39% stake in a Nice-based private TV station, Azur TV. Azur provides news services for the area of the Mediterranean coast between Marseilles and Menton.

== Personal life ==
Safa was considered to be one of Lebanon's wealthiest individuals. He was married to Clara Martinez Thedy and was father to two children, Akram and Alejandro.

At his death, his net worth was estimated to be of 1.45 billion Euros. He owned the Barbossi-Riviera estate in Mandelieu-la-Napoule, the largest private property in the Cote d'Azur.

A Maronite Christian, he offered unlimited supplies of marble from the quarry he owned in southern France to aid in the rebuilding of Notre Dame Cathedral, devastated by fire in April 2019.

== Death ==
Safa died from cancer on 29 January 2024, at the age of 68. His wake was held in the Notre Dame du Liban Church, which Safa himself financed.
