= Mateus Magala =

Mozambican economist, engineer and politician

Minister of Transport and Communications of Mozambique
- Incumbent
- Assumed office 13 June 2022
- President: Filipe Nyusi
- Prime Minister: Adriano Maleiane
- Preceded by: Janfar Abdulai

Personal details
- Education: University of Sydney; Academy of Brno; Victoria University

Mateus Magala is a Mozambican economist, engineer and politician who has served as the Minister of Transport and Communications of Mozambique since June 2022. He had previously served as the Vice President for Corporate Services and Human Resources, of the African Development Bank from September 2018 until his appointment as a cabinet minister. Magala is also a former chairman of Electricidade de Moçambique, the country's electricity distributor.

== Education ==
Magala obtained a bachelor's degree and a master's degree in Mechanical Engineering from the Brno Academy in the Czech Republic in 1990. Magala went on to receive a master's degree in Transport Economics and Management in 1997, a Master of Business Administration in 1998 as well as a master's degree in Economics and Econometrics in 2000 from Victoria University.

== Career ==
Magala held multiple positions during his time at the African Development Bank from 2008 to 2015. On 25 August 2015, he was appointed President of the Board of Directors of the Electricidade de Moçambique following the dismissal of Gildo Sibumbe by the Council of Ministers.

In August 2018, Magala was appointed vice president for Corporate Services and Human Resources at the African Development Bank. A resolution to release from the presidency of the state electricity company was approved by cabinet in October of the same year.

In June 2022, Magala was appointed as Minister of Transport and Communications by Mozambican president Filipe Nyusi.
