= Tuna bonds =

Mozambique debt scandal uncovered in 2016

The tuna bonds scandal (also known as the tuna bond affair or the hidden debt scandal) refers to a debt scandal where the company Privinvest and its owner Iskandar Safa are alleged to have paid over $100 million in bribes to officials in Mozambique and to Credit Suisse employees Andrew Pearse, Surjan Singh, and Detelina Subeva for contracts and loans to develop Mozambique's fishing industry and improve maritime security. However, later investigations discovered that the loans were backed by undisclosed and illegal state guarantees and a large part of the money was embezzled.

== Loans ==
In 2012, while preparing to leave Credit Suisse to start his own firm, Pearse became the lead banker on a series of loans for Mozambique. The deal involved financing provided by Credit Suisse and the Russian bank VTB to a Lebanese shipbuilding company, Privinvest, for the development of a state-owned tuna fishing fleet and maritime security infrastructure.

In February 2013, during a meeting in Maputo, Mozambique, a Privinvest executive, Jean Boustani, offered Pearse a kickback. If Pearse could arrange for Credit Suisse to reduce its arrangement fees by $11 million, half of the savings ($5.5 million) would be paid to Pearse to help fund his new business venture. Pearse accepted the offer. Between 2013 and 2014, three state-owned companies – Ematum, Mozambique Asset Management (MAM), Proindicus – borrowed $622 million from Credit Suisse and $535 million from VTB, ostensibly for a project involving tuna fishing and maritime security. The loans were backed by undisclosed state guarantees and a large part of the money went missing.

After leaving Credit Suisse, Pearse established a company in the United Arab Emirates called Palomar Capital, which was bankrolled by Privinvest. Over the next several years, Privinvest funneled approximately $45 million in kickbacks to Pearse. Other Credit Suisse bankers, including Detelina Subeva and Surjan Singh, also received illicit payments.

A total of $2.2 billion in hidden loans was uncovered in 2016, which triggered a collapse in the metical and a default on its debt. However, it was later revealed by the DOJ that at least $200 million of this amount was diverted as bribes and kickbacks to bankers, government officials, and others. The projects largely failed to materialize, and much of the debt was not properly disclosed by the Mozambican government. International lenders such as the International Monetary Fund withdrew their support for the country.

In 2016, when Mozambique defaulted on the loan repayments, the full scale of the hidden debt became public. In response, the International Monetary Fund and the World Bank froze their support, triggering a sovereign debt crisis that crippled the country's economy. A subsequent study estimated the scandal resulted in the loss of an entire year's economic output for Mozambique and pushed two million people into poverty.

In June 2019 and May 2020, Mozambique's Constitutional Council declared the loans were illegal and void, as they were not approved by the parliament, and ruled that “[n]o expenditure can be assumed, ordered or carried out without being duly registered in the budget of the approved state ... which was not the case.”

== Prosecutions ==
In March 2019, three former Mozambican officials and five business executives were indicted in New York for their alleged role in the scheme. The U.S. Justice Department alleged that the loans were a front for government officials and bankers to enrich themselves. The government of Mozambique brought legal action in the United Kingdom to challenge the validity of the loans, as they were contracted under English law. Privinvest, in their defense, alleged that Filipe Nyusi had received payments as campaign contributions. Mozambican law prohibits public officials from receiving personal payments from third parties in connection with their current or former public officials. Credit Suisse and VTB have argued that the Mozambican government is liable to repay the loans.

Credit Suisse was fined almost US$500 million by UK, US and European regulators for a lack of transparency in the issuing of the bonds, for kickbacks benefitting Credit Suisse bankers and for enabling loans likely to be embezzled by Mozambican officials, including Manuel Chang. In October 2021, Credit Suisse pled guilty to wire fraud and agreed to forgive US$200 million in debt owed by Mozambique to the bank.

The loans were awarded when Armando Guebuza was president of Mozambique. Former Minister of Finance Manuel Chang, who also served in the Guebuza government, was arrested in South Africa on 29 December 2018 at the request of U.S. prosecutors who asked for Chang to be extradited to the US to face trial in connection with the loans. Chang was in jail in South Africa until he was extradited to the United States on July 12, 2023. He was convicted in the US on 8 August 2024 and sentenced to 8.5 years' imprisonment on 17 January 2025. President Filipe Nyusi was defence minister when the deals were made and has also been implicated in the scandal.

In 2024, Privinvest was ordered to pay back 1.9 billion dollars to Mozambique in damages. A subsequent appeal by Privinvest was rejected by the Court.

== Andrew Pearse ==
Andrew Pearse is a New Zealand-born former investment banker, best known for his central role in tuna bond scandal. A former managing director at Credit Suisse, Pearse pleaded guilty to wire fraud in the United States and became a key cooperating witness for the Department of Justice (DOJ). His testimony was instrumental in several related legal cases, including the prosecution of Mozambique's former finance minister. In March 2024, after years of cooperation, Pearse was sentenced to time served.

=== Early life and career ===
Pearse was born in Christchurch, New Zealand, in 1969. He spent his childhood in Tokyo and London before attending private schools and university in the United Kingdom. He trained as a lawyer, then shifted to finance in the 1990s.

Pearse joined Credit Suisse in 2000, rising to become a senior manager in the bank's emerging markets division. At the peak of his career, his compensation package was valued in the millions of pounds sterling annually.

=== Arrest and guilty plea ===
Although an initial investigation by the UK's Financial Conduct Authority concluded without action, the US Department of Justice took up the case, arguing it had jurisdiction because the loans were marketed to American investors. On 3 January 2019, Pearse was arrested at his home in Kent, England, on a US warrant for conspiracy and wire fraud.

Faced with extradition and a lengthy legal battle, and after learning his former colleague and romantic partner Detelina Subeva intended to cooperate, Pearse decided to plead guilty. In July 2019, he formally pleaded guilty to one count of conspiracy to commit wire fraud and agreed to cooperate fully with US prosecutors.

=== Government witness ===
Pearse became a star witness for the DOJ, providing extensive details about the mechanics of the fraud. His testimony, which prosecutors described as the "Rosetta Stone" for understanding the scandal, was critical in several high-profile cases. He testified against Jean Boustani in a 2019 trial in Brooklyn; however, Boustani was ultimately acquitted on jurisdictional grounds. Pearse's cooperation was also vital in securing the 2023 conviction of Mozambique’s former finance minister, Manuel Chang, for conspiracy to commit wire fraud and money laundering.

During this period, Pearse's life was upended. His cooperation led to the public revelation of his affair with Subeva, which ended his marriage. With his assets frozen, he lost his home and savings, taking up manual labor jobs, including starting a garbage collection business called "Waste Not," to support himself while awaiting sentencing.

=== Sentencing ===
On 6 March 2024, Pearse appeared for sentencing before US District Judge Nicholas Garaufis in Brooklyn. Facing a maximum of 13 years in prison, his defense argued for leniency based on his profound cooperation and the severe personal consequences he had already faced. The prosecution acknowledged his indispensable role in uncovering the fraud.

In his statement to the court, Pearse expressed deep remorse, stating, "I had the opportunity to say ‘no’, at every turn. But instead I said 'yes'."

Judge Garaufis sentenced Pearse to time served, effectively meaning no further prison time. In a highly unusual move, the judge left the bench to shake Pearse's hand and wish him luck, noting that it was a time for Pearse and his family to "come back and embrace."

== See also ==
- Filipe Nyusi#Illegal loans
- Manuel Chang
- Credit Suisse#Mozambique secret loans scandal, 2017
