= Esperança Machavela =

Mozambican jurist and politician

Minister of Justice
- In office February 11, 2005 – March 10, 2008
- Succeeded by: Maria Benvinda Levy

Personal details
- Profession: Jurist

Esperança Machavela is a Mozambican jurist and politician.

Machavela was appointed as Minister of Justice by President Armando Guebuza on February 11, 2005, when Guebuza named his new government shortly after taking office. Prior to her appointment, she had worked for the Ministry of Foreign Affairs and had served as an ambassador to Portugal. She was removed from office (along with foreign minister Alcinda Abreu and transport minister Antonio Munguambe) on March 10, 2008, and was succeeded by Maria Benvinda Levy, a former judge of the Maputo City Court.
