= Alberto Vaquina =

Mozambican politician (born 1961)

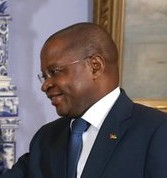

5th Prime Minister of Mozambique
- In office 8 October 2012 – 17 January 2015
- President: Armando Guebuza; Filipe Nyusi
- Preceded by: Aires Ali
- Succeeded by: Carlos Agostinho do Rosário

Personal details
- Born: July 4, 1961 (age 64)
- Party: FRELIMO

Alberto Vaquina (born July 4, 1961) is a Mozambican politician who served as Prime Minister of Mozambique from 2012 to 2015. He was appointed by President Armando Guebuza on 8 October 2012, replacing Aires Ali, who was sacked in a cabinet reshuffle.

Vaquina previously served as Governor of Tete Province from 2010 to 2012.

Political offices
Preceded by Aires Ali	Prime Minister of Mozambique; 2012–2015	Succeeded by Carlos Agostinho do Rosário
