= Death of Elly Warren =

2016 murder in Mozambique

- Date: November 2016
- Location: Tofo Beach, Inhambane province, Mozambique
- Type: Rape, murder
- Convictions: None
- Sentence: None

Elly Warren was an Australian woman who was murdered near Tofo Beach, Inhambane province, in southeastern Mozambique in 2016. Warren was born and raised in Mordialloc in Melbourne, Australia. Warren attended Parkdale Secondary College. Upon her return from Mozambique, Warren had planned to attend James Cook University to study marine biology.

Warren was in Mozambique on a six-week trip where she was volunteering her time and working alongside scientists for Africa Underwater, a research company. She was traveling by herself in Africa. During her time in Mozambique, Warren stayed in a bungalow that was a part of Casa Barry, a popular diving resort, at Tofo Beach. For six weeks, Warren took a boat out to the reefs off the coast of Mozambique with Marine biologists.

On Tuesday, November 8, Warren may have checked in at the Wuyani Pari Yango, where she left some of her belongings. One report, however, indicated that she never checked into the Wuyani Pari Yango according to the manager of the hostel. On a Tuesday night, the end of the six week program with Africa Underwater, Warren went out with some friends to celebrate the end of the program. On Wednesday morning, Warren's body was discovered by a fisherman in or near a toilet block near a street market in Tofo.

== Investigation ==
After her death, there were inconsistent reports as to the cause of and manner of her death. Initially, Inhambane police spokesman Detective Juma Dauto said: "It looks like a sudden death" and "we are in doubt as to what could have happened." He went on: "She didn't have a scratch, didn't have a bruise on her indicating there was violence or rape. I guarantee it. I have total confidence she was not raped. The community here is shocked, this has never happened. Everybody wants to know what happened." Right after her death, Melbourne newspaper The Age reported: “Australian government information — from the Department of Foreign Affairs and the Australian high commission in South Africa — suggests she was found on the beach, raped and murdered.”

Six months after her death, the first formal police report in the case handed indicated that Warren died of a drug overdose even though there was no forensic evidence of drugs in her system.

Her mother launched a petition on Change.org asking Australian Prime Minister Scott Morrison for help in the investigation into the circumstances surrounding her death. The petition read in part: “We ask Scott Morrison as Prime Minister of Australia to intervene in this case to put pressure on the Mozambique government to allow Australia to provide an investigation team to work with the Mozambique police to solve Elly’s murder and give her some justice.” After two weeks, the petition grew to more than thirty-six thousand signatures.

Bill Shorten, the then federal Leader of the Opposition called for diplomatic action from the Australian government as it related to Warren's death.

== Private investigation in 2018 ==
In 2018, Elly's father traveled to Mozambique with a team from 60 Minutes Australia. He was able to trace her last steps, left a notice requesting information and within 24 hours, he was shown a photo of Elly definitely murdered and most probably sexually assaulted. Two witnesses said they saw her later put into a position of a Muslim bowing in prayer. The father accepted the theory that this was done by the investigating police officers in an attempt to cover up the incident and claim that she died from a drug overdose.
