= Minister of Economy and Finance (Mozambique) =

Minister of Economy and Finance (Portuguese: Ministro da Economia e Finanças) is a cabinet level position in the national government of Mozambique.

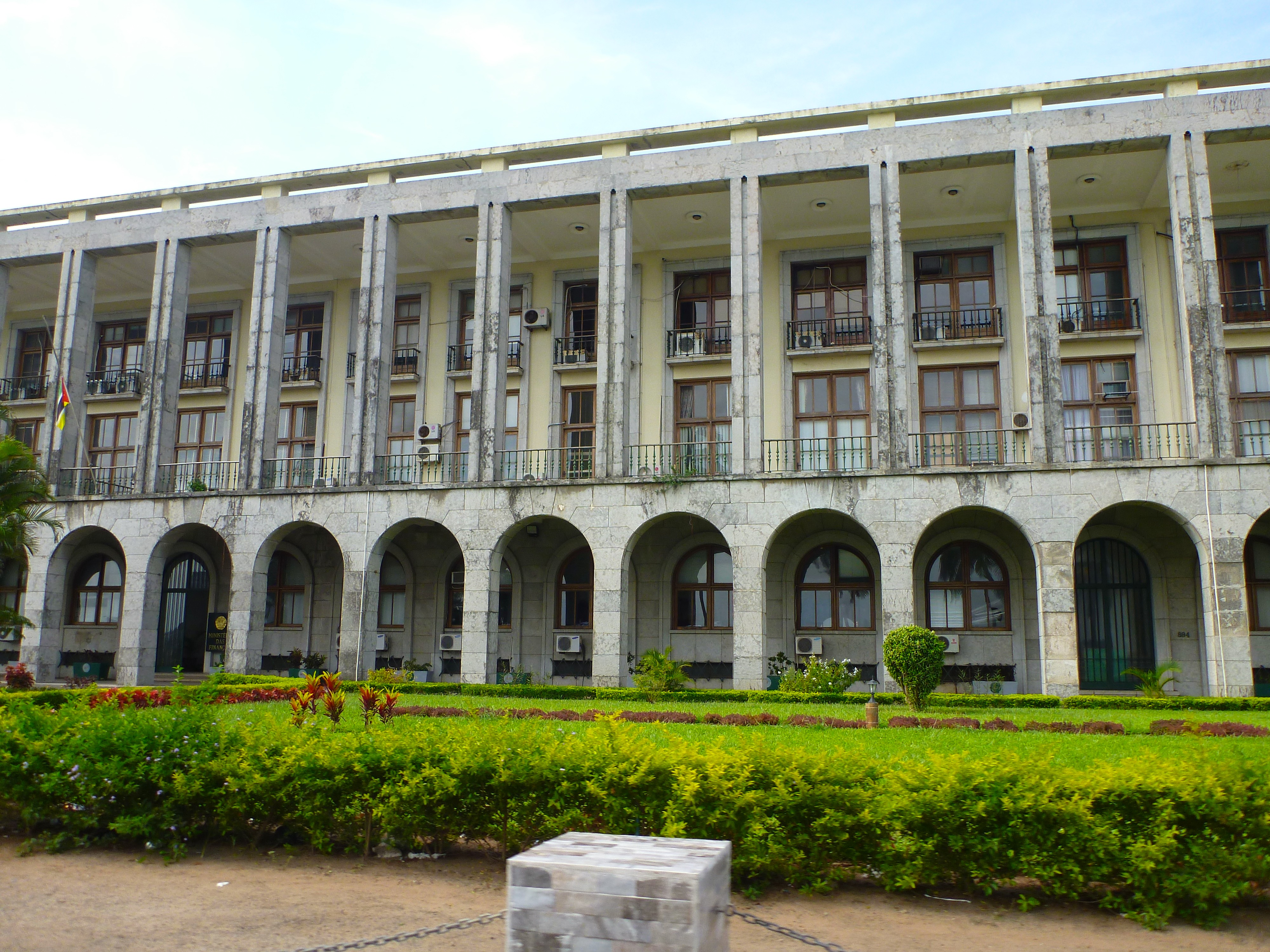
Ministry building

== Ministers of Economy and Finance ==
- Salamão Munguambe, 1975-1978
- Rui Baltazar dos Santos Alves, 1978-1986
- Abdul Magid Osman, 1986-1991
- Eneas Comiche, 1991-1994
- Tomaz Salomão, 1994-2000
- Luísa Diogo, 2000-2005
- Manuel Chang, 2005-2015
- Adriano Maleiane, 2015-2022
- Ernesto Max Elias Tonela, 2022-present

== See also ==
- Government of Mozambique
- Economy of Mozambique
