= Margarida Mapanzene =

Mozambican politician

Governor of Gaza Province
- In office 22 January 2020 – 26 July 2026
- President: Filipe Nyusi; Daniel Chapo
- Succeeded by: Alfeu Cuna

Personal details
- Party: FRELIMO
- Occupation: Politician

Margarida Mapanzene is a Mozambican politician who served as Governor of Gaza Province from January 2020 until her resignation in July 2026. She is a member of the FRELIMO party.

== Political career ==
Mapanzene was elected as the Governor of Gaza Province in the 2019 Mozambican provisional elections. She was officially sworn into the role by President Filipe Nyusi on 22 January 2020 at the Office of the Presidency of the Republic of Mozambique in Maputo. After being formally presented to the public after the swearing in, she pledged to tackle poverty and natural disasters with socioeconomic programs and to encourage more development in the province.

In June 2024, she was again chosen to be the FRELIMO party candidate to be Gaza Province governor during the 2024 Mozambican provisional elections on 9 October. Mapanzene was re-elected as governor during that election.

On 24 July 2026, Mapanzene resigned as Governor of Gaza Province alleging personal issues. She was the first provincial governor to resign under President Daniel Chapo. The FRELIMO party appointed Alfeu Cuna as her successor as governor.
