= Maputo central market =

Market in Maputo, Mozambique

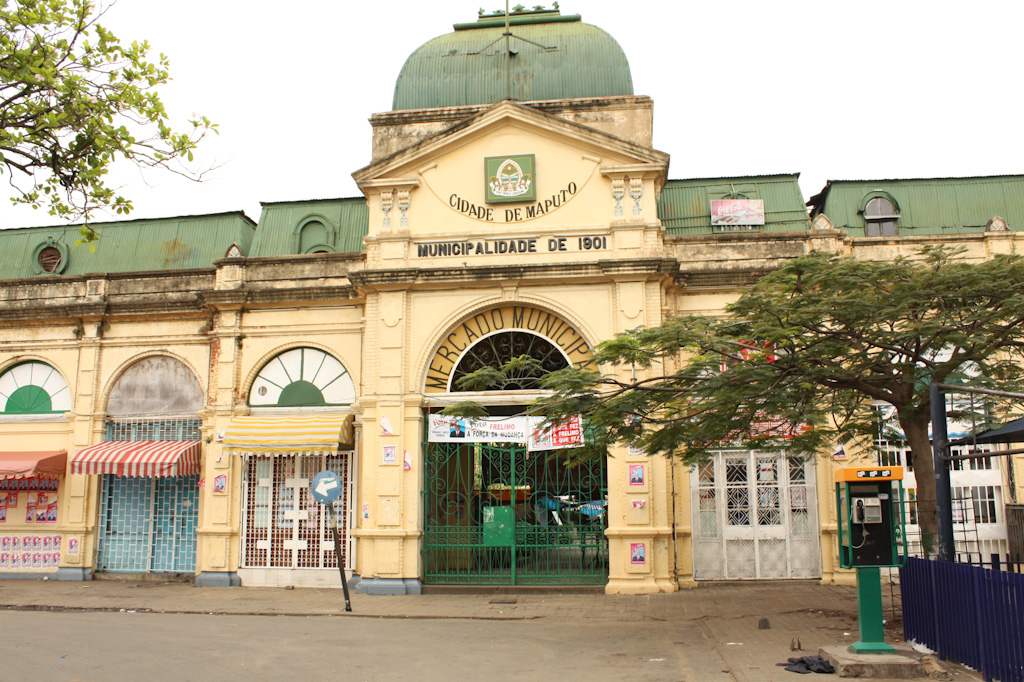
Entrance to the market

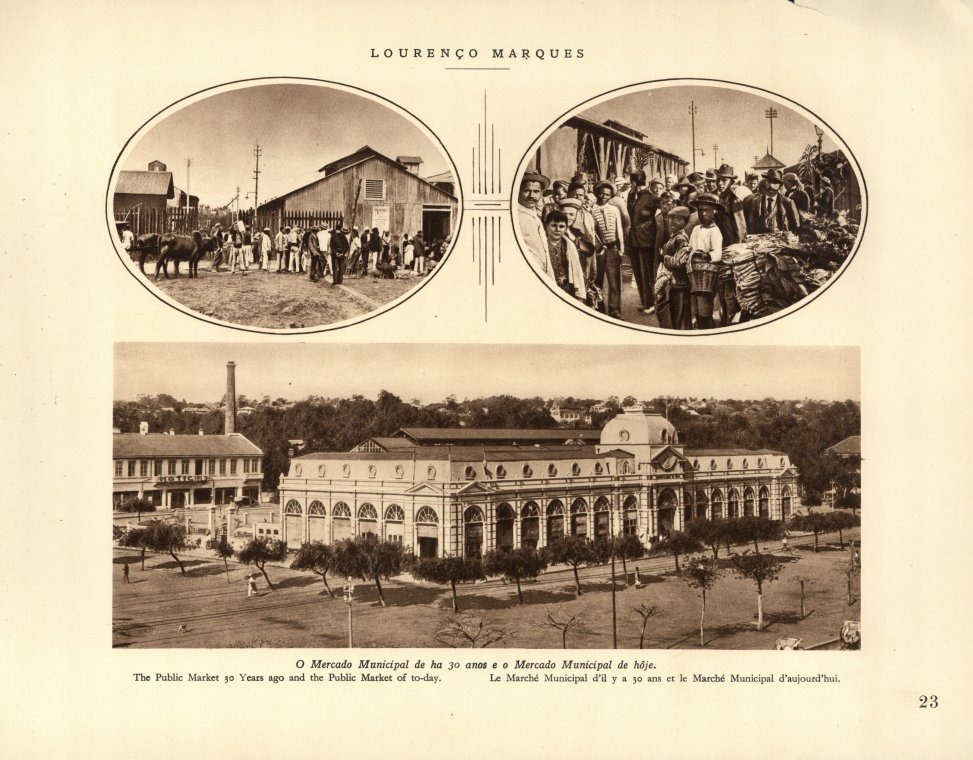
The market in 1929 (lower illustration)

The Mercado Central de Maputo (the Maputo Central Market in English) is a market in the centre of Mozambique’s capital city of Maputo. It is well-known for its design, which dates back to around 1900. The market is also called the "Bazar da Baixa" (downtown bazaar).

== History ==
In 1900, the colonial administration of Portuguese East Africa opted to expand the capital, then known as Lourenço Marques. This involved further urbanization of the coastal zone near the city, including construction of a new market in front of the gates of the city, not far from the port facilities. In 1900 the project was given to the Portuguese company David & Carvalho, who commissioned the architect Carlos Mendes (1869-1922) with the design. It is said that Mendes based the design on Hamburg’s Alsterpavillon.

A large entrance portal with a small tower formed the central access to a large, covered market hall. Small arched niches provided space for fixed sales facilities. To the north, Mendes designed an adjacent open market space. On 19 September 1903, the 18 stalls of the market, consisting of 6 butchers, 6 grocers, 3 fruit shops, 2 bakeries and a bar, were sold. The building was opened on 30 September as "Mercado Municipal Vasco da Gama" in honour of the Portuguese navigator and explorer Vasco da Gama.

From the 1930s, the market began to be called into question on the grounds that, in the face of urban development, it had ceased to be central. In the late 1940s and early 1950s, it was widely agreed that the market was not very aesthetic and was doomed to disappear. However, in 2001, building rehabilitation work was started with the eventual addition of over 150 stalls by 2013. Unfortunately, the construction of a multi-storey car park in 2008 had led to a loss of visibility for the market.
