= Paulo Machava =

Mozambican journalist

- Born: 1954/5
- Died: 28 August 2015; Maputo, Mozambique
- Cause of death: Assassination
- Occupation: Journalist

Paulo Machava (1954/5 – 28 August 2015) was a Mozambican journalist.

== Life ==
Machava started his career as a journalist at Mozambique's public radio station, Rádio Moçambique in the 1980s. He presented a radio show called Onda Matinal ("Morning Wave"), in which he talked about Maputo's organised crime. Following Mozambique's transition to democracy and the introduction of the multi-party system, Machava joined Savana, a weekly newspaper known for being critical of the government, and became its editor-in-chief. In this position, he investigated the scandal around the privatisation of the state-owned Banco Comercial de Moçambique.

Later, he briefly worked at the weekly newspaper Zambeze, before moving to the publishing house of Ericino de Salema. There, he founded the electronic newspaper Diário de Notícias and Embondeiro. Besides being a journalist, he also worked as a consultant for Maputo's gated community "Kaya Kwanga".

On the morning of 28 August 2015, Machava was on his way back to his home from his morning exercise in the centre of Maputo at the corner Avenida Vladimir Lenine / Avenida Augustinho Neto, when he was shot four times by an assailant in a passing car. Machava died at the scene.
