= French International Training Centre for DC =

French International Training Centre for DC (CEFEB, French: Centre d'études financières, économiques et bancaires) is the centre of the French Development Agency organisation (situated in Marseille) which works under the aegis of Minister of Foreign Affairs and Cooperations. Its main aim is to finance the developments made under bilateral agreements.

Under these arrangements CEFEB trains experts to some countries of the Third World and overseas departments and territories of France. The main fields of the studies includes valuation of work and projects, economics of development, small and medium-sized enterprise (SME) management, questions of finance and human resources.

At the end of the proper studies it gives three level diploma, which includes its partners' assessments also. Its partners are University of Paris 1 Pantheon-Sorbonne and University of Auvergne.

Its notable alumni include Jean-Félix Mamalepot, the second president of Bank of Central African States (1990-2007).
