= Maria Benvinda Levy =

Mozambican politician (born 1969)

8th Prime Minister of Mozambique
- Incumbent
- Assumed office 15 January 2025
- President: Daniel Chapo
- Preceded by: Adriano Maleiane

Minister of Justice
- In office 11 March 2008 – 15 January 2015
- Preceded by: Esperança Machavela
- Succeeded by: Abdurremane Lino de Almeida

Personal details
- Born: 24 March 1969 (age 57) Maxixe, Mozambique

Maria Benvinda Levy (born 24 March 1969) is a Mozambican jurist and politician who has been the 16th Prime Minister of Mozambique since her appointment by President Daniel Chapo in 2025. Prior to her tenure as prime minister she was Minister of Justice from 2008 to 2015, and a judge in Maputo.

== Early life ==
Maria Benvinda Delfina Levi was born in Maxixe, Mozambique, on 24 March 1969.

== Career ==
Levy was director of the Legal and Judicial Training Centre, the main place of training for jurists in Mozambique. She was a judge on the city court of Maputo. Levy was an advisor to President Filipe Nyusi.

President Armando Guebuza removed Esperança Machavela as Minister of Justice and replaced her with Levy on 11 March 2008. Levy served as Minister of Justice until 2015.

President Daniel Chapo appointed Levy as Prime Minister of Mozambique on 15 January 2025. She was the second woman to serve as prime minister and her cabinet consisted of 12 people. Levy blamed the 2024–2025 Mozambican protests for a 4.87% decline in economic growth in the fourth quarter of 2024. She attended the papal inauguration of Pope Leo XIV.

== Political positions ==
Levy promoted internal development in 2025, after U.S. President Donald Trump announced a suspension of the $400 million in aid the United States gives to Mozambique. She noted that the aid was not formally cancelled as there was a deadline of 85 days. She stated that the loss of foreign aid from the United States would harm the health of the country as $250 million of the $400 million is dedicated to Mozambique's HIV/AIDS programme.

== Works cited ==
- "Benvinda Levi". Club of Mozambique. 23 March 2025. Archived from the original on 1 July 2025.
- "Benvida Levi promises developments in the face of suspension of US support". MZ News. 27 January 2025. Archived from the original on 1 July 2025.
- "Moçambique: Primeira-Ministra lembrou impacto negativo dos protestos na economia". Radio France Internationale. 10 April 2025. Archived from the original on 1 July 2025.
- "Mozambique: Guebuza Reshuffles Government". allAfrica. 11 March 2008. Archived from the original on 14 May 2008.
- "US aid suspension poses challenge to Mozambique's health sector: PM Levy". Sakshi. 28 January 2025. Archived from the original on 1 July 2025.
- Baloi, Salvador (16 May 2025). "Prime Minister attends investiture of Pope Leo XIV". MZ News. Archived from the original on 1 July 2025.
- Jamal, Jamal (18 January 2025). "Mozambique's new president names Cabinet with female prime minister". Anadolu Agency. Archived from the original on 1 July 2025.
- Mossela, Domingos (7 March 2024). "Marcelo Rebelo de Sousa nega "favorecimento" ao candidato presidencial da Frelimo". Archived from the original on 1 July 2025.

Political offices
Preceded by Adriano Maleiane	Prime Minister of Mozambique; 2025–present	Incumbent
