= Aires Ali =

Mozambican politician (born 1955)

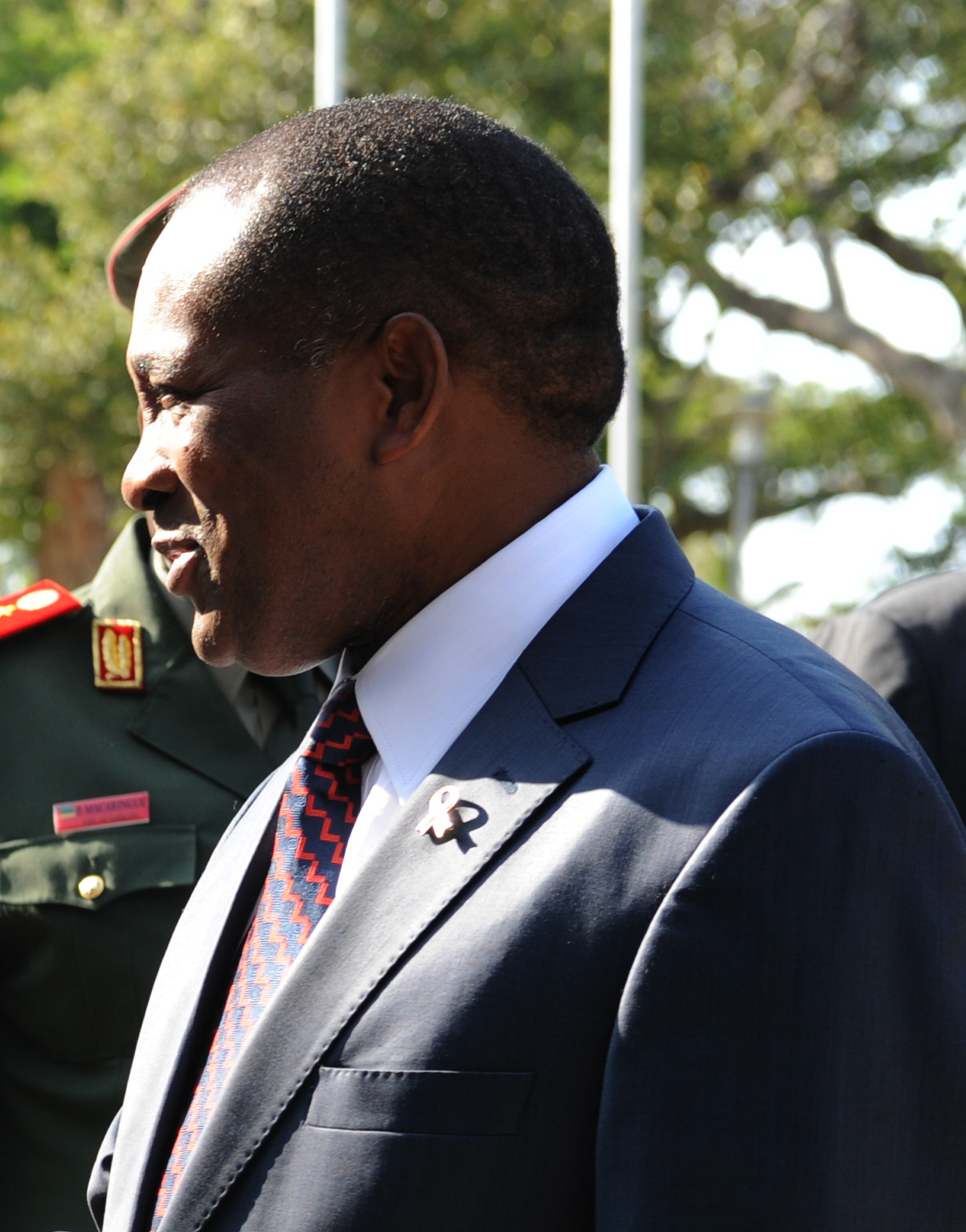
- Aires Ali at the start of an International Military HIV/AIDS Conference in Maputo during May 2012

4th Prime Minister of Mozambique
- In office 16 January 2010 – 8 October 2012
- President: Armando Guebuza
- Preceded by: Luisa Diogo
- Succeeded by: Alberto Vaquina

Personal details
- Born: 6 December 1955 (age 70)
- Party: FRELIMO

Aires Bonifácio Baptista Ali (born 6 December 1955) is a Mozambican politician who was Prime Minister of Mozambique from 16 January 2010 to 8 October 2012, when he was sacked by Mozambican President Armando Guebuza in a cabinet reshuffle.

Ali comes from the province of Niassa in the north of Mozambique. He worked as a teacher at the FRELIMO Secondary School in Namaacha in the district of Namaacha from 1976. In 1977, he became the principal (director) of Francisco Manyanga Secondary School in Maputo. From 1980 to 1986, Ali was a provincial Director of Education in the province of Nampula in eastern Mozambique. In 1989/1990, he worked as Head of Office for the then Minister of Education and Culture. From 1991 to 1992, he was the National Director of School Social Welfare Programs, responsible for government support programs for schools and other educational institutions.

He was Governor of Inhambane Province from 2000 to 2004 and Minister of Education from 2005 to 2010. He was appointed ambassador to China in June 2016 by President Filipe Nyusi.

== Notes ==
Political offices
Preceded by Luisa Diogo	Prime Minister of Mozambique; 2010–2012	Succeeded by Alberto Vaquina
