= Manuel Chang =

Mozambican finance minister from 2005 to 2015

Minister of Economy and Finance
- In office February 2005 – January 2015
- President: Armando Guebuza
- Preceded by: Luísa Diogo
- Succeeded by: Adriano Maleiane

Personal details
- Born: 22 August 1955 (age 70) Gaza Province, Portuguese East Africa
- Party: FRELIMO
- Occupation: Economist

Manuel Chang (Chinese: 曼努埃尔·郑; born 22 August 1955 in Gaza Province) is a Mozambican economist and former politician of the FRELIMO party. From 2005 to 2015 he served as the Minister of Economy and Finance in the cabinet of President Armando Guebuza. He replaced Luísa Diogo as Finance Minister in February 2005. His work as Finance Minister was intertwined in a debt scandal. In January 2015 when President Filipe Nyusi assumed office he replaced Chang as Finance Minister with Adriano Maleiane.

== Debt scandal ==
Three state-owned Mozambique companies were created to exploit the county's marine resources; Proindicus was to perform coastal surveillance, Ematun was to engage in tuna fishing and MAM was to build and maintain shipyards. Debt problems began in 2013, when the Abu Dhabi-based shipbuilding and offshore construction company, Privinvest, obtained a $366 million contract with Proindicus, financed by IMF loans. The loans for this and other marine projects were requested by State Information and Security Service (SISE). As Finance Minister Chang confirmed to Swiss bankers that proceeds from a state loan should be paid to a commercial broker instead of to the Mozambique Central Bank. Chang guaranteed loans, that were illegal under Mozambique law, and kept these loans secret even from other cabinet members. In 2016 a default on Eurobonds issued by the Mozambican government to hide these and other unpaid loans first brought these actions to public attention.

Chang was arrested in December 2018 in South Africa for his part in diverting loan funds, based upon an indictment in the United States. His extradition to the U.S. was delayed when the government of Mozambique also filed a competing request for extradition. However, in February 2020 Mozambique withdrew its request, and Chang was extradited to the United States on July 12, 2023. The trial against him began in July 2024. On August 8, 2024, a federal jury convicted him of conspiracy to commit wire fraud and conspiracy to commit money laundering for his role in a $2 billion fraud, bribery and money laundering scheme that enabled investments in the United States and elsewhere. On 17 January 2025, Chang was sentenced to 8.5 years' imprisonment.
