= 2007 Mozambican flood =

Mozambique

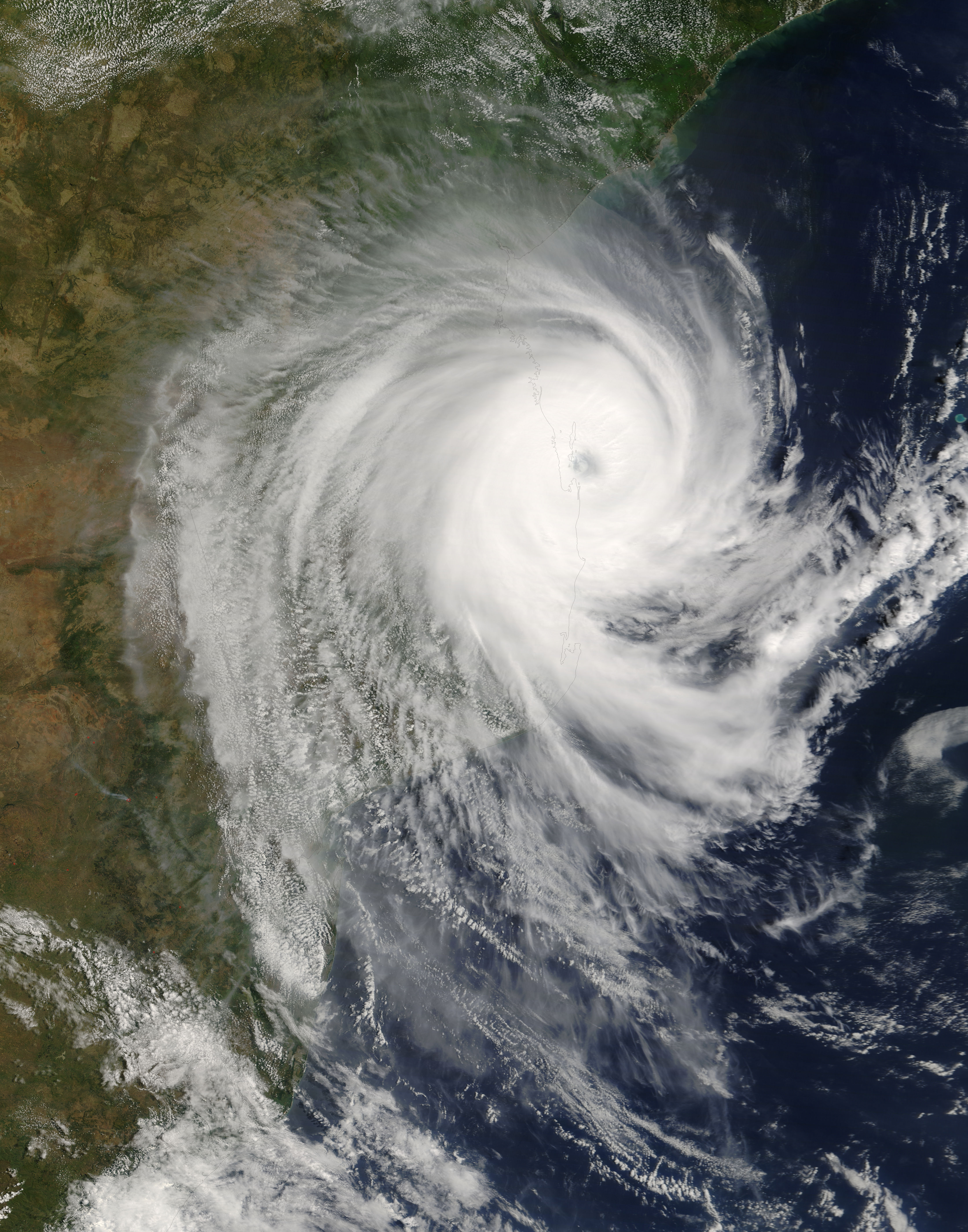
Cyclone Favio made landfall on February 22, 2007.

The 2007 Mozambican flood began in late December 2006 when the Cahora Bassa Dam overflowed from heavy rains on Southern Africa. It worsened on February 22, 2007, when the Category 4 Cyclone Favio made landfall on the central province of Inhambane; experts tracking the cyclone predicted that it would worsen flooding in the Zambezi River valley. The Zambezi River broke its banks, flooding the surrounding areas in Mozambique. The Chire and Rivubue rivers also flooded.

80,600 people had been evacuated from their homes in the Tete, Manica, Sofala and Zambezia provinces by February 14. By February 22, the United Nations Office for the Coordination of Humanitarian Affairs reported that approximately 121,000 people had been displaced by the flooding. Some people refused to leave their homes and livestock. There were 29 confirmed casualties and a further 10 unconfirmed deaths.

In early February, the Mozambican authorities did not think the flooding would be as devastating as the 2000 and 2001 floods. Paulo Zucula, head of Mozambique's national relief agency, said "We expect more water than we had in 2001. The situation is deteriorating and it will get worse but this time we are better prepared than in 2001". The World Food Programme (WFP) estimated that up to 285,000 people may require food aid. Delivery of food aid by the WFP began on February 15. A single UN helicopter was made available for the delivery of aid to evacuation centres. However, thousands of people had not yet received food or drinking water, and the threat of disease outbreaks had also increased; Paulo Zucula retracted his earlier comments about readiness, saying "We were not prepared... it's another disaster".
