= COVID-19 pandemic in Mozambique =

Ongoing COVID-19 viral pandemic in Mozambique

- Disease: COVID-19
- Pathogen: SARS-CoV-2
- Location: Mozambique
- First outbreak: Wuhan, Hubei, China
- Arrival date: 22 March 2020 (6 years, 4 months, 4 weeks and 2 days)
- Confirmed cases: 233,935 (updated 5 August 2026)
- Deaths: 2,252 (updated 5 August 2026)

The COVID-19 pandemic in Mozambique is part of the worldwide pandemic of coronavirus disease 2019 (COVID-19) caused by severe acute respiratory syndrome coronavirus 2 (SARS-CoV-2). The virus was confirmed to have reached Mozambique in March 2020.

== Background ==
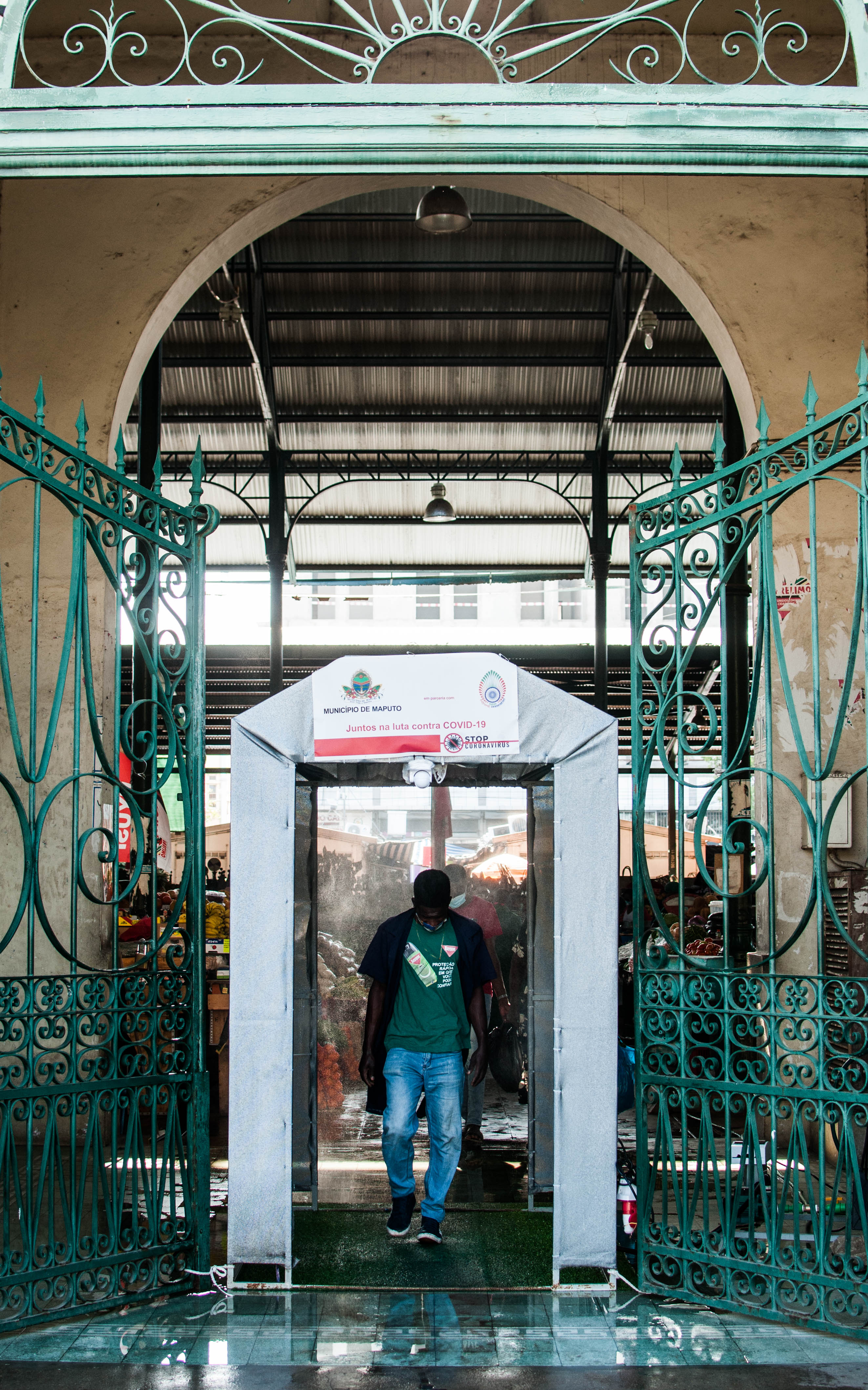
A desinfection tunnel at Maputo's Central Market

On 12 January 2020, the World Health Organization (WHO) confirmed that a novel coronavirus was the cause of a respiratory illness in a cluster of people in Wuhan City, Hubei Province, China, which was reported to the WHO on 31 December 2019.

The case fatality ratio for COVID-19 has been much lower than SARS of 2003, but the transmission has been significantly greater, with a significant total death toll. Model-based simulations for Mozambique indicate that the 95% confidence interval for the time-varying reproduction number R_{t} exceeded 1.0 in December 2020 and January 2021.

== Timeline ==
- The country's first case was announced on 22 March, a 75-year-old man who returned from the United Kingdom. During the month there were 8 eight confirmed cases, all of whom remained active at the end of March.
- On 8 April 2020, Mozambique registered seven new positive cases of COVID-19, increasing the total number of confirmed cases to 17, nine of which are local transmissions. In April there were 68 new cases, bringing the total number of confirmed cases to 76. Twelve patients recovered, leaving 64 active cases at the end of the month.
- The first two deaths from COVID-19 occurred on 25 and 28 May. During the month there were 178 new cases, bringing the total number of confirmed cases to 254. The number of recovered patients increased by 79 to 91 and the death toll at the end of the month was 2, leaving 161 active cases.
- After ending May with 254 confirmed cases, the number of confirmed cases had doubled by 13 June, with a further 44 cases confirmed on that day alone.
- The country recorded its third death on 14 June, an 84-year-old man from Nampula Province.
- There were 635 new cases on June, raising the total number of confirmed cases to 889. The death toll rose to 6. The number of recovered patients increased by 141 to 232, leaving 651 active cases at the end of the month.
- In July there were 975 new cases, raising the total number of cases to 1864. The death toll almost doubled to 11. The number of recovered patients increased by 409 to 641, leaving 1212 active cases at the end of the month, up by 86% from the end of June.
- There were 2052 new cases in August, raising the total number of cases to 3916. The death toll more than doubled to 23. At the end of the month there were 1723 active cases, an increase by 42% from the end of July.
- There were 4640 new cases in September, raising the total number of cases to 8556. The death toll more than doubled to 59. The number of recovered patients increased to 5205, leaving 3292 active cases at the end of the month.
- On 13 October 2020, Health Minister Armindo Tiago tested positive for COVID-19.
- There were 4313 new cases in October, bringing the total number of confirmed cases to 12869. The death toll rose to 92. The number of recovered patients increased to 10437, leaving 2340 active cases at the end of the month.
- There were 2832 new cases in November, bringing the total number of confirmed cases to 15701. The death toll rose to 131. The number of recovered patients increased to 13729, leaving 1841 active cases at the end of the month.
- There were 2941 new cases in December 2020, taking the total number of confirmed cases to 18642. The death toll rose to 166. The number of recovered patients increased to 16663, leaving 1813 active cases at the end of the month.
- Health Minister Armindo Tiago announced on 27 January 2021 that the 501.V2 variant had been circulating in Mozambique since November 2020.
- The number of confirmed cases and the death toll more than doubled in January 2021, to 38654 and 367 respectively. The number of recovered patients increased to 23955, leaving 14332 active cases at the end of the month.
- There were 20696 new cases in February, taking the total number of confirmed cases to 59350. The death toll rose to 641. The number of recovered patients increased to 41096, leaving 17613 active cases at the end of the month.
- Vaccinations started on 8 March 2021.
- There were 8229 new cases in March, taking the total number of confirmed cases to 67579. The death toll rose to 775. The number of recovered patients increased to 56409, leaving 10391 active cases at the end of the month.
- There were 2338 new cases in April, taking the total number of confirmed cases to 69917. The death toll rose to 814. The number of recovered patients increased to 65913, leaving 3186 active cases at the end of the month.
- There were 878 new cases in May, taking the total number of confirmed cases to 70795. The death toll rose to 836. The number of recovered patients increased to 69525, leaving 430 active cases at the end of the month.
- There were 5609 new cases in June, raising the total number of confirmed cases to 76404. The death toll rose to 878. The number of recovered patients increased to 71205, leaving 4321 active cases at the end of the month.
- There were 45624 new cases in July, raising the total number of confirmed cases to 122028. The death toll rose to 1434. The number of recovered patients increased to 88370, leaving 32210 active cases at the end of the month.
- There were 24288 new cases in August, taking the total number of confirmed cases to 146316. The death toll rose to 1864. The number of recovered patients increased to 133574, leaving 10878 active cases at the end of the month.
- There were 4407 new cases in September, taking the total number of confirmed cases to 150723. The death toll rose to 1917. The number of recovered patients increased to 146969, leaving 1837 active cases at the end of the month.
- There were 569 new cases in October, bringing the total number of confirmed cases to 151292. The death toll rose to 1930. The number of recovered patients increased to 149209, leaving 153 active cases at the end of the month.
- There were 256 new cases in November, bringing the total number of confirmed cases to 151548. The death toll rose to 1941. The number of recovered patients increased to 149514, leaving 93 active cases at the end of the month. Mozambique's first two cases of the omicron variant were reported on 30 November.
- There were 37532 new cases in December 2021, bringing the total number of confirmed cases to 189080. The death toll rose to 2006. The number of recovered patients increased to 156570, leaving 30500 active cases at the end of the month. Modelling by WHO's Regional Office for Africa suggests that due to under-reporting, the true cumulative number of infections by the end of 2021 was around 14 million while the true number of COVID-19 deaths was around 6222.
- There were 34731 new cases in January 2022, bringing the total number of confirmed cases to 223811. The death toll rose to 2170. The number of recovered patients increased to 212070, leaving 9571 active cases at the end of the month.
- There were 1236 new cases in February, bringing the total number of confirmed cases to 225047. The death toll rose to 2192. The number of recovered patients increased to 219430, leaving 3421 active cases at the end of the month.
- There were 179 new cases in March, bringing the total number of confirmed cases to 225226. The death toll rose to 2200. The number of recovered patients increased to 222998, leaving 54 active cases at the end of the month.
- There were 160 new cases in April, bringing the total number of confirmed cases to 225386. The death toll rose to 2201. The number of recovered patients increased to 223133, leaving 52 active cases at the end of the month.
- There were 368 new cases in May, bringing the total number of confirmed cases to 225754. The death toll rose to 2203. The number of recovered patients increased to 223397, leaving 150 active cases at the end of the month.
- There were 2165 new cases in June, bringing the total number of confirmed cases to 227919. The death toll rose to 2212. The number of recovered patients increased to 225314, leaving 389 active cases at the end of the month.
- There were 1682 new cases in July, bringing the total number of confirmed cases to 229601. The death toll rose to 2215. The number of recovered patients increased to 226997, leaving 332 active cases at the end of the month.
- There were 479 new cases in August, bringing the total number of confirmed cases to 230080. The death toll rose to 2220. The number of recovered patients increased to 227722, leaving 134 active cases at the end of the month.
- There were 232 new cases in September, bringing the total number of confirmed cases to 230312. The death toll rose to 2222. The number of recovered patients increased to 227967, leaving 123 active cases at the end of the month.
- There were 163 new cases in October, bringing the total number of confirmed cases to 230475. The death toll rose to 2224. The number of recovered patients increased to 228176, leaving 75 active cases at the end of the month.
- There were 215 new cases in November, bringing the total number of confirmed cases to 230690. The death toll rose to 2226.
- There were 529 new cases in December 2022, bringing the total number of confirmed cases to 231219. The death toll rose to 2232. The number of recovered patients increased to 228801, leaving 186 active cases at the end of the month.
- There were 2,512 confirmed cases in 2023, bringing the total number of confirmed cases to 233,731. The death toll rose to 2,250.

== See also ==
- COVID-19 pandemic in Africa
- COVID-19 pandemic by country and territory
