= Adriano Maleiane =

Prime Minister of Mozambique from 2022 to 2025

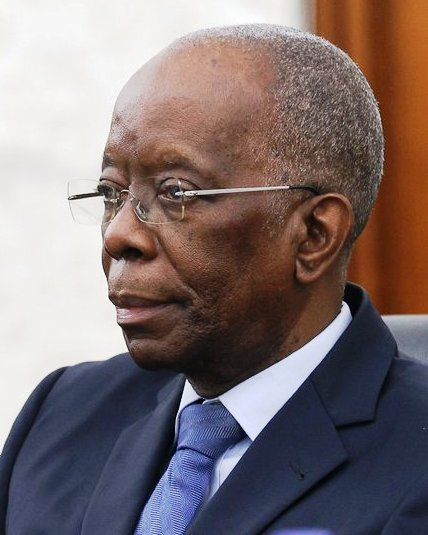
- Maleiane in 2022

7th Prime Minister of Mozambique
- In office 3 March 2022 – 15 January 2025
- President: Filipe Nyusi
- Preceded by: Carlos Agostinho do Rosário
- Succeeded by: Maria Benvinda Levy

Personal details
- Born: 6 November 1949 (age 77) Matola, Portuguese Mozambique
- Party: FRELIMO
- Education: Eduardo Mondlane University, University of London
- Occupation: Economist

Adriano Afonso Maleiane (born 6 November 1949) is a Mozambican economist and politician who was the Prime Minister of Mozambique from 3 March 2022 to 15 January 2025.

== Early life and education ==
Maleiane graduated in economics at Eduardo Mondlane University and got his master's degree in managerial finance at University of London.

== Career ==
Between 1991 and 2006 Maleiane w as the governor of the Mozambican central bank, the Bank of Mozambique. He was chairman and CEO of the Banco Nacional de Investimento (BNI), Mozambique's state-owned development bank, between 2011 and January 2015.

Since 19 January 2015, Maleiane had been the Minister of Economy and Finance in President Filipe Nyusi's cabinet. He was the Prime Minister of Mozambique from 3 March 2022 until 17 January 2025.

== Other activities ==
- International Monetary Fund (IMF), ex officio member of the board of governors
- Islamic Development Bank (IsDB), ex officio member of the board of governors

Political offices
Preceded by Carlos Agostinho do Rosário	Prime Minister of Mozambique; 2022–2025	Succeeded by Maria Benvinda Levy
