= Carlos Agostinho do Rosário =

Prime Minister of Mozambique (2015–2022)

Carlos Agostinho do Rosário de Campos
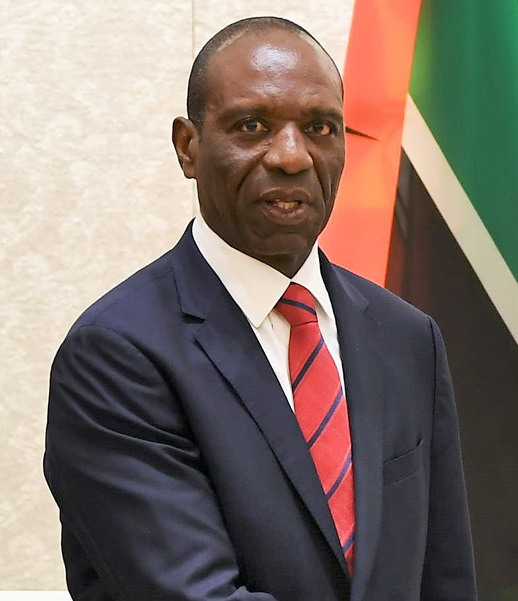

6th Prime Minister of Mozambique
- In office 17 January 2015 – 3 March 2022
- President: Filipe Nyusi
- Preceded by: Alberto Vaquina
- Succeeded by: Adriano Maleiane

Personal details
- Born: 26 October 1954 (age 71) Maxixe, Mozambique
- Party: FRELIMO
- Education: Eduardo Mondlane University; University of London

Carlos Agostinho do Rosário (born 26 October 1954) is a Mozambican politician who was the Prime Minister of Mozambique from 17 January 2015 until 3 March 2022. He is a member of the FRELIMO, and served under President Filipe Nyusi. He worked as a civil servant in the 1970s and was Governor of Zambezia Province between 1987 and 1994. Later he served a short while as MP in 1994 before becoming Minister of Agriculture and Fisheries, in which post he served until 1999. Afterwards he became a diplomat in Asia; prior to his appointment as prime minister, Rosario served as ambassador to Indonesia.

== Career ==
Rosário was born in Maxixe on 26 October 1954. He studied economics at the Eduardo Mondlane University in Maputo. He then went to the United Kingdom to study Sustainable Agriculture and Rural Development Economy at Wye College, obtaining an Msc. In 1977, he started working for the Ministry of Public Works in the Economics and Finances department, where he stayed on until 1983. Between 1980 and 1982 he was an evening lecturer at the Instituto Industrial de Maputo. In 1983 he became the main economist for the agricultural firm Citrinos de Manica.

In 1987 he was named Governor of Zambezia Province and prime secretary of the Provincial Committee. In 1994, he was briefly a member of the Assembly of the Republic before being made Minister of Agriculture and Fisheries. In 1999, his term as Minister ended. He was High Commissioner of Mozambique to India and Sri Lanka from 2002 to 2008. In 2009, he became Ambassador to Indonesia, with concurrent accreditation to Malaysia, Singapore, Thailand and East Timor. He remained in that post until his appointment as Prime Minister on 17 January 2015 by President Filipe Nyusi. After the formation of a Government under Rosário, opposition politicians from RENAMO complained that all 22 ministers were from the FRELIMO party and that the government therefore was not inclusionary.

In January 2020 he started a new term as prime minister. On 3 March 2022, Rosário, along with six members of the Cabinet, were dismissed by President Nyusi.

== Personal life ==
Rosário is a football enthusiast and he played in the junior national team. He also set up a diplomat team while posted in Indonesia.

Political offices
Preceded by Alberto Vaquina	Prime Minister of Mozambique; 2015–2022	Succeeded by Adriano Maleiane
