= List of prime ministers of Mozambique =

Prime Minister of Mozambique
- Primeiro Ministro de Moçambique (Portuguese)
- Emblem of Mozambique
- Incumbent; Maria Benvinda Levy since 15 January 2025
- Appointer: President of Mozambique
- Constituting instrument: Constitution of Mozambique (2004)
- Inaugural holder: Mário da Graça Machungo
- Formation: 17 July 1986; 40 years ago
- Website: www.portaldogoverno.gov.mz

This article lists the prime ministers of Mozambique, since the establishment of the office of prime minister of Portuguese Mozambique in 1974.

The current prime minister of Mozambique is Maria Benvinda Levy. She assumed the office on 15 January 2025.

== Prime ministers of Mozambique (1974–present) ==
No.	Portrait	Prime Minister	Took office	Left office	Time in office	Party	Election
Portuguese Mozambique
1	Joaquim Chissano	Joaquim Chissano (born 1939)	20 September 1974	25 June 1975	278 days	FRELIMO	—
People's Republic of Mozambique
Post abolished (25 June 1975 – 17 July 1986)
1	Mário da Graça Machungo	Mário da Graça Machungo (1940–2020)	17 July 1986	1 December 1990	4 years, 137 days	FRELIMO	—
Republic of Mozambique
(1)	Mário da Graça Machungo	Mário da Graça Machungo (1940–2020)	1 December 1990	16 December 1994	4 years, 15 days	FRELIMO	—
2	Pascoal Mocumbi	Pascoal Mocumbi (1941–2023)	16 December 1994	17 February 2004	9 years, 63 days	FRELIMO	1994; 1999
3	Luísa Diogo	Luísa Diogo (1958–2026)	17 February 2004	16 January 2010	5 years, 333 days	FRELIMO	2004
4	Aires Ali	Aires Ali (born 1955)	16 January 2010	8 October 2012	2 years, 266 days	FRELIMO	2009
5	Alberto Vaquina	Alberto Vaquina (born 1961)	8 October 2012	17 January 2015	2 years, 101 days	FRELIMO	—
6	Carlos Agostinho do Rosário	Carlos Agostinho do Rosário (born 1954)	17 January 2015	3 March 2022	7 years, 45 days	FRELIMO	2014; 2019
7	Adriano Maleiane	Adriano Maleiane (born 1949)	3 March 2022	15 January 2025	2 years, 318 days	FRELIMO	—
8	Maria Benvinda Levy	Maria Benvinda Levy (born 1969)	15 January 2025	Incumbent	1 year, 286 days	FRELIMO	2024

== See also ==
- List of presidents of Mozambique
- List of colonial governors of Mozambique
- List of heads of the National Resistance Government of Mozambique

== Sources ==
- http://rulers.org/rulm2.html#mozambique
- http://www.worldstatesmen.org/Mozambique.htm
- African States and Rulers, John Stewart, McFarland
- Guinness Book of Kings, Rulers & Statesmen, Clive Carpenter, Guinness Superlatives Ltd
- Heads of State and Government, 2nd Edition, John V da Graca, MacMillan Press 2000
