= History of Mozambique =

Mozambique was a Portuguese colony, overseas province and later a member state of Portugal. It gained independence from Portugal in 1975.

== Pre-colonial history ==
=== Prehistoric Mozambique ===
In 2007, Julio Mercader, of the University of Calgary, recovered dozens of 100,000-year-old stone tools from a deep limestone cave (Ngalue) near Lake Niassa in Mozambique showing that wild sorghum, the ancestor of the chief cereal consumed today in sub-Saharan Africa for flours, bread, porridges, and alcoholic beverages, was being consumed by Homo sapiens along with African wine palm, the false banana, pigeon peas, wild oranges, and the African "potato." This is the earliest direct evidence of humans using pre-domesticated cereals anywhere in the world.

The first inhabitants of what is now Mozambique were the San hunters and gatherers, ancestors of the Khoisani peoples. Between 400BC-400AD waves of Bantu-speaking peoples migrated from the north through the Zambezi River valley and then gradually into the plateau and coastal areas. The Bantu were farmers and iron workers.

=== Intercultural contact ===
When Vasco da Gama, exploring for Portugal, reached the coast of Mozambique in 1498, Arab trading settlements had existed along the coast and outlying islands for several centuries, and political control of the coast was in the hands of a string of local sultans. Muslims had actually lived in the region for quite some time; the famous Arab historian and geographer, Al-Masudi, reported Muslims amongst Africans in the land of Sofala in 947 (modern day Mozambique, itself a derivative of the name of the Sheikh who ruled the area at the time when the Portuguese arrived, Mussa Bin Bique). Most of the local people had embraced Islam. The region lay at the southernmost end of a traditional trading world that encompassed the Red Sea, the Hadhramaut coast of Arabia and the Indian coast, described in the 1st-century coasting guide that is called the Periplus of the Erythraean Sea.

== Portuguese Mozambique (1498–1975) ==
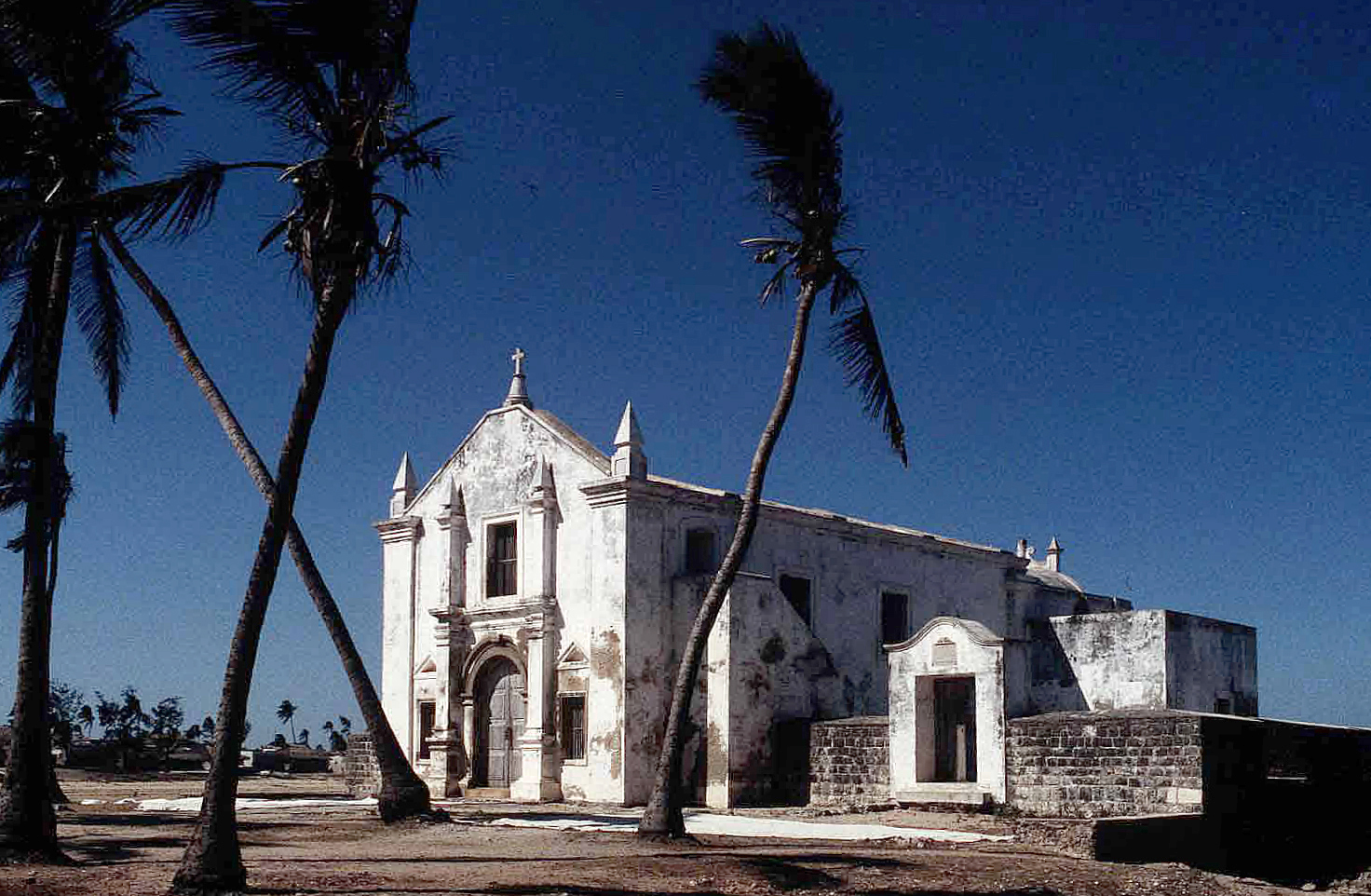
The Island of Mozambique is a small coral island at the mouth of Mossuril Bay on the Nacala coast of northern Mozambique, first explored by Europeans in the late 15th century.

From about 1500, Portuguese trading posts and forts displaced the Arabic commercial and military hegemony, becoming regular ports of call on the new European sea route to the east.

The voyage of Vasco da Gama around the Cape of Good Hope in 1498 marked the Portuguese entry into trade, politics, and society of the region. The Portuguese gained control of the Island of Mozambique and the port city of Sofala in the early 16th century, and by the 1530s, small groups of Portuguese traders and prospectors seeking gold penetrated the interior regions, where they set up garrisons and trading posts at Sena and Tete on the River Zambezi and tried to gain exclusive control over the gold trade.

The Portuguese attempted to legitimise and consolidate their trade and settlement positions through the creation of prazos (land grants) tied to Portuguese settlement and administration. While prazos were originally developed to be held by Portuguese, through intermarriage they became African Portuguese or African Indian centres defended by large African slave armies known as Chikunda. Historically within Mozambique there was slavery. Human beings were bought and sold by African tribal chiefs, Arab Muslim traders and Portuguese and other European traders as well. Many Mozambican slaves were supplied by tribal chiefs who raided warring tribes and sold their captives to the prazeiros.

Although Portuguese influence gradually expanded, its power was limited and exercised through individual settlers and officials who were granted extensive autonomy. The Portuguese were able to wrest much of the coastal trade from Arab Muslims between 1500 and 1700, but, with the Arab Muslim seizure of Portugal's key foothold at Fort Jesus on Mombasa Island (now in Kenya) in 1698, the pendulum began to swing in the other direction. As a result, investment lagged while Lisbon devoted itself to the more lucrative trade with India and the Far East and to the colonisation of Brazil.

During these wars, the Mazrui and Omani Arabs reclaimed much of the Indian Ocean trade, forcing the Portuguese to retreat south. Many prazos had declined by the mid-19th century, but several of them survived. During the 19th century other European powers, particularly the British (British South Africa Company) and the French (Madagascar), became increasingly involved in the trade and politics of the region around the Portuguese East African territories.

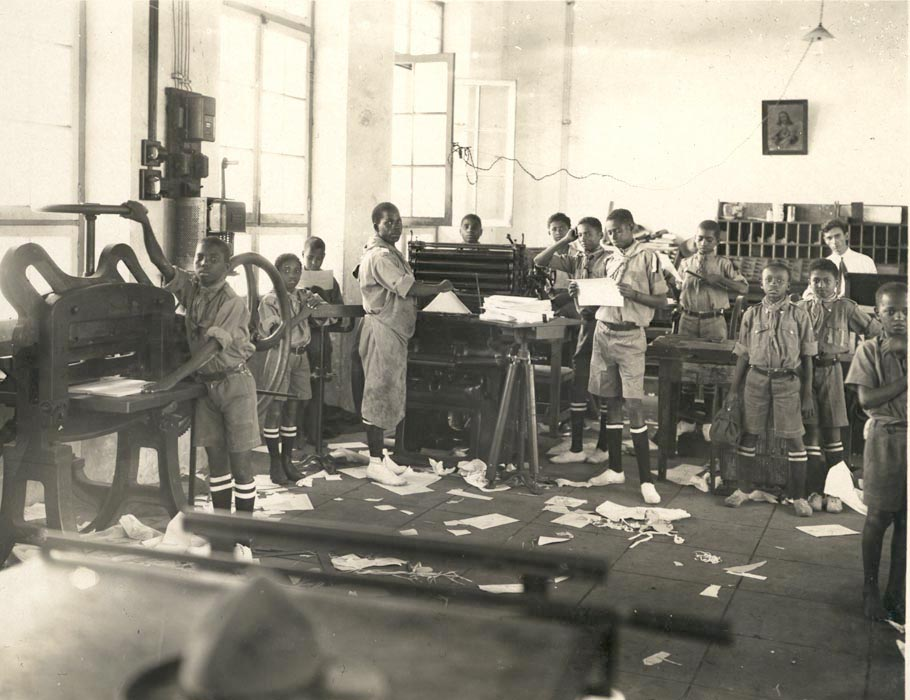
Portuguese language printing and typesetting class, 1930

By the early 20th century the Portuguese had shifted the administration of much of Mozambique to large private companies, like the Mozambique Company, the Zambezia Company and the Niassa Company, controlled and financed mostly by the British, which established railroad lines to their neighbouring colonies (South Africa and Rhodesia). Although slavery had been legally abolished in Mozambique, at the end of the 19th century the Chartered companies enacted a forced labor policy and supplied cheap—often forced—African labour to the mines and plantations of the nearby British colonies and South Africa. The Zambezia Company, the most profitable chartered company, took over a number of smaller prazeiro holdings, and established military outposts to protect its property. The chartered companies built roads and ports to bring their goods to market including a railroad linking present day Zimbabwe with the Mozambican port of Beira.

Due to their unsatisfactory performance and the shift, under the corporatist Estado Novo regime of Oliveira Salazar, towards a stronger Portuguese control of Portuguese Empire's economy, the companies' concessions were not renewed when they ran out. This was what happened in 1942 with the Mozambique Company, which however continued to operate in the agricultural and commercial sectors as a corporation, and had already happened in 1929 with the termination of the Niassa Company's concession. In 1951, the Portuguese overseas colonies in Africa were rebranded as Overseas Provinces of Portugal.

== Mozambican War of Independence (1964–1974) ==
Portuguese colonies in Africa at the time of the Portuguese Colonial War

As communist and anti-colonial ideologies spread out across Africa, many clandestine political movements were established in support of Mozambican independence. These movements claimed that since policies and development plans were primarily designed by the ruling authorities for the benefit of Mozambique's Portuguese population, little attention was paid to Mozambique's tribal integration and the development of its native communities.

This affected a majority of the indigenous population who suffered both state-sponsored discrimination and enormous social pressure.

The Front for the Liberation of Mozambique (FRELIMO) initiated a guerrilla campaign against Portuguese rule in September 1964. This conflict—along with the two others already initiated in the other Portuguese colonies of Angola and Portuguese Guinea—became part of the so-called Portuguese Colonial War (1961–1974). From a military standpoint, the Portuguese regular army maintained control of the population centres while the guerrilla forces sought to undermine their influence in rural and tribal areas in the north and west. As part of their response to FRELIMO, the Portuguese government began to pay more attention to creating favourable conditions for social development and economic growth.

== Independence (1975) ==
After 10 years of sporadic warfare and Portugal's return to democracy through a leftist military coup in Lisbon, which replaced Portugal's Estado Novo regime with a military junta (the Carnation Revolution of April 1974), FRELIMO took control of the territory. Within a year, most of the 250,000 Portuguese in Mozambique had left—some expelled by the government of the nearly independent territory, some fleeing in fear—and Mozambique became independent from Portugal on 25 June 1975. A law had been passed on the initiative of the then relatively unknown Armando Guebuza of the FRELIMO party ordering Portuguese citizens to either become exclusively Mozambican, or leave the country in 24 hours with only 20 kilograms (44 pounds) of luggage. Unable to salvage any of their assets, most of them returned to Portugal penniless.

== Civil War (1977–1992) ==
Formed in 1975, Mozambican National Resistance (RENAMO), an anti-communist group sponsored by the Rhodesian Intelligence Service, and the apartheid government in South Africa, launched a series of attacks on transport routes, schools and health clinics, and the country descended into civil war. In the United States, the CIA and conservatives lobbied for support to RENAMO, which was strongly resisted by the State Department, which would "not recognize or negotiate with RENAMO".

In 1984, Mozambique negotiated the Nkomati Accord with P. W. Botha and the South African government, in which Mozambique was to expel the African National Congress in exchange for South Africa stopping support of RENAMO. At first both sides complied but it soon became evident that infringements were taking place on both sides and the war continued. In 1986, Mozambican President Samora Machel died in an air crash in South African territory. Although unproven, many suspect the South African government of responsibility for his death. Machel was replaced by Joaquim Chissano as president. The war was marked by huge human rights violations by both RENAMO and FRELIMO.

With support for RENAMO from South Africa drying up, in 1990 the first direct talks between the FRELIMO government and RENAMO were held. In November 1990 a new constitution was adopted. Mozambique was now a multiparty state, with periodic elections, and guaranteed democratic rights. On 4 October 1992, the Rome General Peace Accords, negotiated by the Community of Sant'Egidio with the support of the United Nations, were signed in Rome between President Chissano and RENAMO leader Afonso Dhlakama, which formally took effect on the October 15, 1992. A UN Peacekeeping Force (ONUMOZ) oversaw a two-year transition to democracy. The last ONUMOZ contingents departed in early 1995.

== Democratic era (1994–present) ==
Mozambique held elections in 1994, which were accepted by most parties as free and fair while still contested by many nationals and observers alike. FRELIMO won, under Joaquim Chissano, while RENAMO, led by Afonso Dhlakama, ran as the official opposition.

In 1995, Mozambique joined the Commonwealth of Nations, becoming, at the time, the only member nation that had never been part of the British Empire.

By mid-1995, over 1.7 million refugees who had sought asylum in neighboring countries had returned to Mozambique, part of the largest repatriation witnessed in sub-Saharan Africa. An additional four million internally displaced persons had returned to their homes.

In December 1999, Mozambique held elections for a second time since the civil war, which were again won by FRELIMO. RENAMO accused FRELIMO of fraud, and threatened to return to civil war, but backed down after taking the matter to the Supreme Court and losing.

In early 2000 a cyclone caused widespread flooding in the country, killing hundreds and devastating the already precarious infrastructure. There were widespread suspicions that foreign aid resources have been diverted by powerful leaders of FRELIMO. Carlos Cardoso, a journalist investigating these allegations, was murdered but his death was not satisfactorily explained.

Indicating in 2001 that he would not run for a third term, Chissano criticized leaders who stayed on longer than he had, which was generally seen as a reference to Zambian president Frederick Chiluba, who at the time was considering a third term, and Zimbabwean president Robert Mugabe, then in his fourth term. Presidential and National Assembly elections took place on December 1–2, 2004. FRELIMO candidate Armando Guebuza won with 64% of the popular vote. His opponent, Afonso Dhlakama of RENAMO, received 32% of the popular vote. FRELIMO won 160 seats in Parliament. A coalition of RENAMO and several small parties won the 90 remaining seats. Armando Guebuza was inaugurated as the President of Mozambique on February 2, 2005.

Much of the economic recovery which has followed the end of the Mozambican Civil War (1977–1992) is being led by investors and tourists from neighbour South Africa and from East Asia. A number of returning Portuguese nationals have also invested in the country as well as some Italian organizations. Coal and gas have grown to become large sectors. The income per capita tripled over twenty years since the civil war.

Mozambique was declared to be free of land mines in 2015, following a 22-year effort to remove explosive devices planted during the War of Independence and Civil War.

The candidate of the ruling Mozambican Liberation Front's (Frelimo) Filipe Nyusi has been the President of Mozambique since January 2015 after winning the election in October 2014.

President Filipe Nyusi was re-elected after a landslide victory in the 2019 general elections. Frelimo won 184 seats, Renamo got 60 seats and the MDM party received the remaining six in the National Assembly. The opposition did not accept the results because of allegations of fraud and irregularities. Frelimo secured two-thirds majority in parliament which allowed Frelimo to re-adjust the constitution without needing the agreement of the opposition.

In October 2024 the ruling FRELIMO party, which has increasingly become marked with growing concerns of authoritarianism and impunity amid the controversies surrounding the 2023 local elections and the 2019 general election. The FRELIMO party was also declared the winner of the 2024 general election, with its leader, Daniel Chapo, proclaimed as president-elect. This was disputed by Venâncio Mondlane, with his party PODEMOS claiming Mondlane had received 53% of the vote using data from their poll observers. The result was also questioned by the Episcopal Conference of Mozambique and the European Union, while deadly protests broke out over the election results, with at least 250 deaths, mostly demonstrators being killed by police and army forces. On 15 January 2025, Daniel Chapo was sworn in as Mozambique's fifth president.

== See also ==
- History of Africa
- History of Southern Africa
- List of heads of state of Mozambique
- Politics of Mozambique
- Cities in Mozambique:
  - Beira history and timeline
  - Maputo history and timeline
