= Foreign relations of Mozambique =

While alliances dating back to the Mozambican War of Independence remain relevant, Mozambique's foreign policy has become increasingly pragmatic. The twin pillars of the policy are maintenance of good relations with its neighbors and maintenance and expansion of ties to development partners.

== History ==
During the 1970s and early 1980s, Mozambique's foreign policy was inextricably linked to the struggles for majority rule in Rhodesia and South Africa as well as superpower competition and the Cold War. Mozambique's decision to enforce United Nations sanctions against Rhodesia and support Rhodesian guerrillas led Ian Smith's regime to undertake overt and covert actions to destabilize the country. Although the change of government in Zimbabwe in 1980 removed this threat, the apartheid regime in South Africa continued to finance the destabilization of Mozambique.

The 1984 Nkomati Accord, while failing in its goal of ending South African support to RENAMO, opened initial diplomatic contacts between the Mozambican and South African governments. This process gained momentum with South Africa's elimination of apartheid, which culminated in the establishment of full diplomatic relations in October 1993. While relations with neighboring Zimbabwe, Malawi, Zambia, and Tanzania show occasional strains, Mozambique's ties to these countries remain strong.

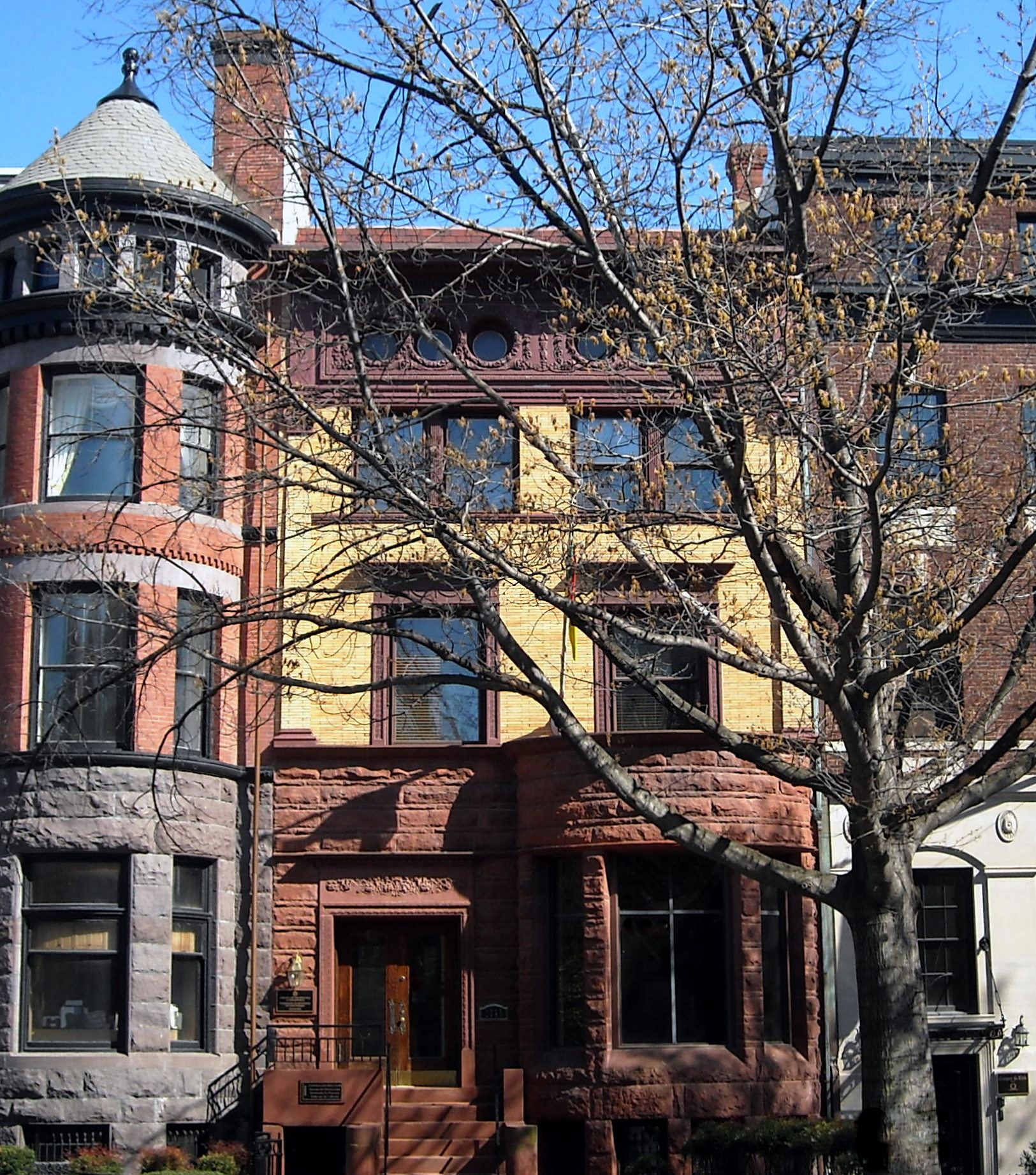
Embassy of Mozambique in Washington, D.C.

In the years immediately following its independence, Mozambique benefited from considerable assistance from some western countries, notably the Scandinavians. The Soviet Union and its allies, however, became Mozambique's primary economic, military, and political supporters and its foreign policy reflected this linkage. This began to change in 1983; in 1984 Mozambique joined the World Bank and International Monetary Fund. Western aid quickly replaced Soviet support, with the Scandinavians, Finland, the United States, the Netherlands, and the European Union becoming increasingly important sources of development assistance. Italy also maintains a profile in Mozambique as a result of its key role during the peace process. Relations with Portugal, the former colonial power, are complex and of some importance as Portuguese investors play a visible role in Mozambique's economy.

Mozambique is a member of the Non-Aligned Movement and ranks among the moderate members of the African Bloc in the United Nations and other international organizations. Mozambique also belongs to the Organisation of African Unity/African Union and the Southern African Development Community. In 1994, the Government became a full member of the Organisation of the Islamic Conference (now the Organisation of Islamic Cooperation), in part to broaden its base of international support but also to please the country's sizeable Muslim population. Similarly, in early 1996 Mozambique joined its Anglophone neighbors in the Commonwealth. In the same year, Mozambique became a founding member and the first President of the Community of Portuguese Language Countries (CPLP), and maintains close ties with other Lusophone states. The country is also a member of the Port Management Association of Eastern and Southern Africa (PMAESA).

Illicit drugs: Southern African transit point for South Asian hashish, South Asian heroin, and South American cocaine probably destined for the European and South African markets; producer of cannabis (for local consumption) and methaqualone (for export to South Africa); corruption and poor regulatory capability makes the banking system vulnerable to money laundering, but the lack of a well-developed financial infrastructure limits the country's utility as a money-laundering center.

== Diplomatic relations ==
List of countries which Mozambique maintains diplomatic relations with:

#	Country	Date
1	Albania	25 June 1975
2	Bulgaria	25 June 1975
3	Canada	25 June 1975
4	Cambodia	25 June 1975
5	China	25 June 1975
6	Republic of the Congo	25 June 1975
7	Denmark	25 June 1975
8	Egypt	25 June 1975
9	Guinea	25 June 1975
10	India	25 June 1975
11	Iraq	25 June 1975
12	Italy	25 June 1975
13	Netherlands	25 June 1975
14	Nigeria	25 June 1975
15	North Korea	25 June 1975
16	Norway	25 June 1975
17	Poland	25 June 1975
18	Portugal	25 June 1975
19	Romania	25 June 1975
20	Serbia	25 June 1975
21	Somalia	25 June 1975
22	Sweden	25 June 1975
23	Vietnam	25 June 1975
24	Tanzania	25 June 1975
25	Zambia	25 June 1975
26	Burundi	26 June 1975
27	Hungary	26 June 1975
28	Russia	28 June 1975
29	Finland	18 July 1975
30	Syria	5 August 1975
31	Madagascar	9 August 1975
32	Pakistan	9 August 1975
33	Uganda	19 August 1975
34	Guyana	21 August 1975
35	United Kingdom	27 August 1975
36	Cuba	29 August 1975
37	Lesotho	9 September 1975
38	Eswatini	11 September 1975
39	United States	23 September 1975
40	Mongolia	27 September 1975
41	Brazil	14 November 1975
42	Belgium	5 December 1975
43	Cameroon	9 December 1975
44	Botswana	1975
45	Tunisia	1975
46	Germany	3 February 1976
47	France	21 February 1976
48	Sierra Leone	12 March 1976
49	Cape Verde	12 March 1976
50	Switzerland	12 April 1976
51	Rwanda	17 April 1976
52	Sudan	17 April 1976
53	Guinea-Bissau	9 June 1976
54	Democratic Republic of the Congo	30 July 1976
55	Greece	30 September 1976
56	Austria	19 October 1976
57	Czech Republic	5 November 1976
58	Kenya	5 November 1976
59	Japan	9 January 1977
60	Spain	27 May 1977
61	Ghana	27 June 1978
62	Angola	5 September 1978
63	Jamaica	7 August 1979
64	Algeria	16 September 1979
65	Laos	16 April 1980
66	Zimbabwe	30 April 1980
67	Cyprus	3 May 1980
—	Sahrawi Arab Democratic Republic	August 1980
68	Turkey	20 January 1981
69	Nicaragua	January 1981
70	Malawi	1 July 1981
71	Grenada	27 July 1981
72	Argentina	19 October 1981
73	Libya	December 1981
74	São Tomé and Príncipe	1981
75	Australia	1 April 1982
76	Suriname	10 October 1982
77	Iran	13 February 1983
78	Bangladesh	24 March 1983
79	Seychelles	August 1983
80	Ethiopia	10 December 1983
81	Mauritius	29 November 1984
82	Afghanistan	7 January 1985
83	Comoros	20 June 1985
84	Peru	20 February 1986
85	Vanuatu	6 September 1986
86	Nepal	30 September 1986
87	Bolivia	20 November 1986
88	Luxembourg	7 January 1988
89	Mexico	26 February 1988
90	Colombia	10 May 1988
—	State of Palestine	31 January 1989
91	Thailand	19 April 1989
92	Malaysia	1989
93	New Zealand	6 June 1990
94	Chile	25 July 1990
95	Indonesia	4 October 1991
96	Latvia	29 April 1992
97	Oman	4 May 1993
98	Israel	26 July 1993
99	South Korea	11 August 1993
100	Ukraine	19 August 1993
101	Uruguay	1 October 1993
102	South Africa	11 October 1993
103	Lithuania	30 March 1994
104	Qatar	11 June 1994
105	Slovakia	10 May 1995
106	Azerbaijan	20 June 1995
107	Armenia	13 September 1995
108	Maldives	27 November 1995
—	Holy See	14 December 1995
109	Moldova	17 January 1996
110	United Arab Emirates	3 April 1996
111	Kuwait	20 May 1996
112	Ireland	13 June 1996
113	Brunei	18 June 1996
114	Singapore	29 July 1996
115	Croatia	23 August 1996
116	Georgia	13 September 1996
117	Bosnia and Herzegovina	27 September 1996
118	Turkmenistan	22 November 1996
119	Ecuador	3 December 1996
120	Slovenia	19 December 1996
121	Saudi Arabia	1996
122	Guatemala	4 February 1997
123	North Macedonia	28 February 1997
124	Iceland	4 March 1997
125	Philippines	27 March 1997
126	Haiti	25 September 1997
127	Belize	30 September 1997
128	Paraguay	3 October 1997
129	Bahrain	3 November 1997
130	Lebanon	20 April 1998
131	Sri Lanka	12 March 1999
132	Belarus	29 February 2000
133	Costa Rica	15 March 2001
134	Timor-Leste	21 May 2002
135	Bahamas	7 September 2005
136	Venezuela	16 November 2005
137	Mauritania	23 February 2006
138	Namibia	23 November 2006
139	Kazakhstan	18 June 2008
140	Liberia	17 December 2008
141	Malta	18 May 2009
142	Estonia	25 September 2009
143	Trinidad and Tobago	10 February 2010
144	Montenegro	27 May 2010
145	Equatorial Guinea	13 July 2011
146	Mali	13 July 2011
147	South Sudan	15 July 2011
148	Jordan	9 August 2012
149	Gabon	5 December 2012
150	Fiji	6 December 2012
151	Eritrea	10 December 2012
152	Tajikistan	5 September 2013
153	Niger	29 May 2014
154	Senegal	29 May 2014
155	Burkina Faso	16 September 2015
156	El Salvador	29 September 2015
157	Central African Republic	18 February 2016
158	Saint Kitts and Nevis	9 November 2017
159	Ivory Coast	11 December 2017
160	Benin	24 October 2018
161	Andorra	2 August 2019
162	Dominican Republic	26 September 2019
163	Kyrgyzstan	27 September 2019
164	Monaco	20 October 2022
165	Gambia	11 June 2025
166	Uzbekistan	21 June 2025
167	Morocco	Unknown

== Bilateral relations ==
Country	Formal relations began	Notes
Angola	5 September 1978	See Angola–Mozambique relations: Angola has an embassy in Maputo.; Mozambique has an embassy in Luanda.; Both nations were formerly part of the Portuguese Empire.
Brazil	15 November 1975	See Brazil–Mozambique relations Both countries established diplomatic relations on 15 November 1975: Brazil has an embassy in Maputo.; Mozambique has an embassy in Brasília and a consulate in Belo Horizonte.
Canada	25 June 1975	See Canada–Mozambique relations Both countries established diplomatic relations on 25 June 1975: Canada has a high commission in Maputo.; Mozambique is accredited to Canada from its embassy in Washington, D.C., United States.
China	25 June 1975	Both countries established diplomatic relations on 25 June 1975 See China–Mozambique relations China-Mozambique relations date back to the 1960s, when China began to support the struggle of Mozambique's Marxist-oriented FRELIMO party against Portuguese colonialism. Diplomatic relations were formally established on 25 June 1975, soon after Mozambique gained its independence from Portugal. In November 2006, Mozambique became the thirteenth African country to be added to China's official list of tourism destinations. Hu Jintao, president of the People's Republic of China, made an official visit to Mozambique in February 2007, during which he and Armando Guebuza, the president of Mozambique, pledged further cooperation in the areas of economy, technology, agriculture, education and sports.: China has an embassy in Maputo.; Mozambique has an embassy in Beijing and a consulate-general in Macau.
Cuba	27 August 1975	Both countries established diplomatic relations on 27 August 1975: Cuba has an embassy in Maputo.; Mozambique has an embassy in Havana.
Denmark	25 June 1975	Both countries established diplomatic relations on 25 June 1975 See Denmark–Mozambique relations: Denmark has an embassy in Maputo.; Mozambique is accredited to Denmark from its embassy in Stockholm, Sweden.
Finland	18 July 1975	See Finland–Mozambique relations: Both countries established diplomatic relations on 18 July 1975; Mozambique is represented in Finland through its embassy in Stockholm, Sweden.; Finland has an embassy in Maputo.
France	19 February 1976	See France–Mozambique relations Both countries established diplomatic relations on 19 February 1976: France has an embassy in Maputo.; Mozambique has an embassy in Paris.
Germany	3 February 1976	See Germany–Mozambique relations Both countries established diplomatic relations on 3 February 1976: Germany has an embassy in Maputo.; Mozambique has an embassy in Berlin.
India	25 June 1975	Both countries established diplomatic relations on 25 June 1975 See India–Mozambique relations: India has a High Commission in Maputo.; Mozambique maintains a High Commission in New Delhi.
Japan	January 1977	See Japan–Mozambique relations: Japan has an embassy in Maputo; Mozambique has an embassy in Tokyo
Kenya	5 November 1976	See Kenya–Mozambique relations Both countries established diplomatic relations on 5 November 1976 when Ambassador of Kenya Hon. Kiyinda Nincola, has presented his credentials to President of Mozambique Samora Moises Machel.: Kenya has a high commission in Maputo.; Mozambique has a high commission in Nairobi.
Malawi	1 July 1981	See Malawi-Mozambique relations Both countries established diplomatic relations on 1 July 1981: Malawi has a high commission in Maputo.; Mozambique has a high commission in Lilongwe.
Mexico	26 February 1988	Both countries established diplomatic relations on 26 February 1988 See Mexico–Mozambique relations: Mexico is accredited to Mozambique from its embassy in Pretoria, South Africa.; Mozambique is accredited to Mexico from its embassy in Washington, D.C., United States.
Portugal	25 June 1975	See Mozambique–Portugal relations Both countries established diplomatic relations on 25 June 1975 Both nations are members of the Community of Portuguese Language Countries.: Mozambique has an embassy in Lisbon and a consulate-general in Porto.; Portugal has an embassy in Maputo and a consulate-general in Beira.; Portuguese companies are the second largest private investor in Mozambique.; In July 2008, Mozambique and Portugal have signed an agreement to set up a fund to support investments worth US$124 million in the Mozambican energy sector.; In July 2008, Portugal cancelled Mozambique's remaining debts to Portugal, estimated at US$393.4 million, accumulated from independence until 2005.
Russia	25 June 1975	Both countries established diplomatic relations on 25 June 1975 See Mozambique–Russia relations Mozambique-Russia relations date back to the 1960s, when Soviet Union began to support the struggle of Mozambique's Marxist-oriented FRELIMO party against Portuguese colonialism. Most leaders of the FRELIMO were trained in Moscow. Diplomatic relations were formally established on 25 June 1975, soon after Mozambique gained its independence from Portugal. In June 2007, both Russia and Mozambique signed an agreement on economic cooperation.: Mozambique has an embassy in Moscow.; Russia has an embassy in Maputo.
São Tomé and Príncipe	1981	Mozambique is accredited to São Tomé and Príncipe from its embassy in Luanda, Angola and maintains an honorary consulate in São Tomé.; São Tomé and Príncipe is accredited to Mozambique from its embassy in Luanda, Angola and maintains an honorary consulate in Maputo.
South Africa	26 September 1993	See Mozambique–South Africa relations Both countries established diplomatic relations on 26 September 1993: Mozambique has a high commission in Pretoria and a consulate-general in Johannesburg and consulates in Cape Town, Durban and Mbombela.; South Africa has a high commission in Maputo.
South Korea	11 August 1993	Establishment of Diplomatic Relations between the Republic of Korea and Mozambique on 11 August 1993 There were 78 South Koreans living in Mozambique in 2012.
Spain	27 May 1977	See Mozambique–Spain relations Both countries established diplomatic relations on 27 May 1977: Mozambique has an embassy in Madrid.; Spain has an embassy in Maputo.
Tanzania	25 June 1975	See Mozambique–Tanzania relations Both countries established diplomatic relations on 25 June 1975: Mozambique has a high commission in Dar es Salaam and a consulate-general in Zanzibar City.; Tanzania has a high commission in Maputo.
Turkey	20 January 1981	See Mozambique–Turkey relations Both countries established diplomatic relations on 20 January 1981: Mozambique is accredited to Turkey from its embassy in Rome, Italy.; Turkey has an embassy in Maputo.; Trade volume between the two countries was US$153 million in 2019.
United Kingdom	27 August 1975	See Mozambique–United Kingdom relations Mozambican President Armando Guebuza with British Prime Minister David Cameron and British Foreign Secretary William Hague in 10 Downing Street, May 2012. Mozambique established diplomatic relations with the United Kingdom on 27 August 1975.: Mozambique maintains ahigh commission in London.; The United Kingdom is accredited to Mozambique through its high commission in Maputo.; Both countries share common membership of the Commonwealth, the United Nations, and the World Trade Organization, as well as the Southern Africa Customs Union and Mozambique–UK Economic Partnership Agreement. Bilaterally the two countries have a Development Partnership, a High Level Prosperity Partnership, and an Investment Agreement.
United States	23 September 1975	See Mozambique–United States relations Both countries established diplomatic relations on 23 September 1975 Relations between the United States and Mozambique are good and steadily improving. By 1993, U.S. aid to Mozambique was prominent, due in part to significant emergency food assistance in the wake of the 1991-93 southern African drought, but more importantly in support of the peace and reconciliation process. During the process leading up to elections in October 1994, the United States served as a significant financier and member of the most important commissions established to monitor implementation of the Rome General Peace Accords. The United States is the largest bilateral donor to the country and plays a leading role in donor efforts to assist Mozambique.: Mozambique has an embassy in Washington, D.C.; United States has an embassy in Maputo.

== See also ==
- List of diplomatic missions of Mozambique
- List of diplomatic missions in Mozambique
