= Mozambique–Netherlands relations =

- Mozambique: Netherlands

Mozambique–Netherlands relations are the bilateral relations between Mozambique and the Netherlands. Diplomatic ties were established on June 25, 1975. Mozambique is accredited to the Netherlands from its embassy in Brussels, Belgium and while the Netherlands has an embassy in Maputo.

== History ==
In 1975 after Mozambique independence, Dutch engineers came to Mozambique to help with water and irrigation.

In December 2025, the Netherlands withdrew $1.1 billion worth from an LNG project in Mozambique, due to human rights violations.

In December 2025, Dutch Vice-Minister for International Cooperation and Trade, Pascalle Grotenhuis, visited the Port of Beira to strengthen bilateral cooperation with Mozambique. The visit mainly focused on the development of the Beira Cooridor. While in Sofala, Grotenhuis talked about the Netherlands plan to support development, climate resilience, and inclusive economic growth. The two nations signed a Memorandum of Understanding.

In August 2026, Dutch ambassador to Mozambique, Elsbeth Akkerman, and French ambassador to Mozambique, Yann Pradeau, visited with President of Mozambique, Daniel Chapo, where the Netherlands expressed the importance of their economic partnership with Mozambique, highlighting maritime logistics as an area for development. Akkerman stated “Holland and Mozambique continue to cooperate. We are promoting our economic partnership through interventions in the development corridors, both Beira and Nacala, particularly in agriculture, agro-logistics, and maritime development.”

== Trade ==
There are 20 Dutch companies registered in Mozambique, looking for trade and investment.

In 2024, the Netherlands exported $87.9M worth of goods to Mozambique. Their top export was tug boats, which totaled $15.6M. In the same year, Mozambique exported $322M worth of goods to the Netherlands, their top export was raw aluminium which totaled $215M.

== High-level visits ==
=== High level visits from the Netherlands to Mozambique ===
- Pascalle Grotenhuis (December 2025)
- Elsbeth Akkerman (August 2026)

== Diplomatic missions ==
- Mozambique is accredited to the Netherlands through its embassy in Brussels.
- The Netherlands has an embassy in Maputo.

== See also ==
- Foreign relations of Mozambique
- Foreign relations of the Netherlands
