= Brazil–Mozambique relations =

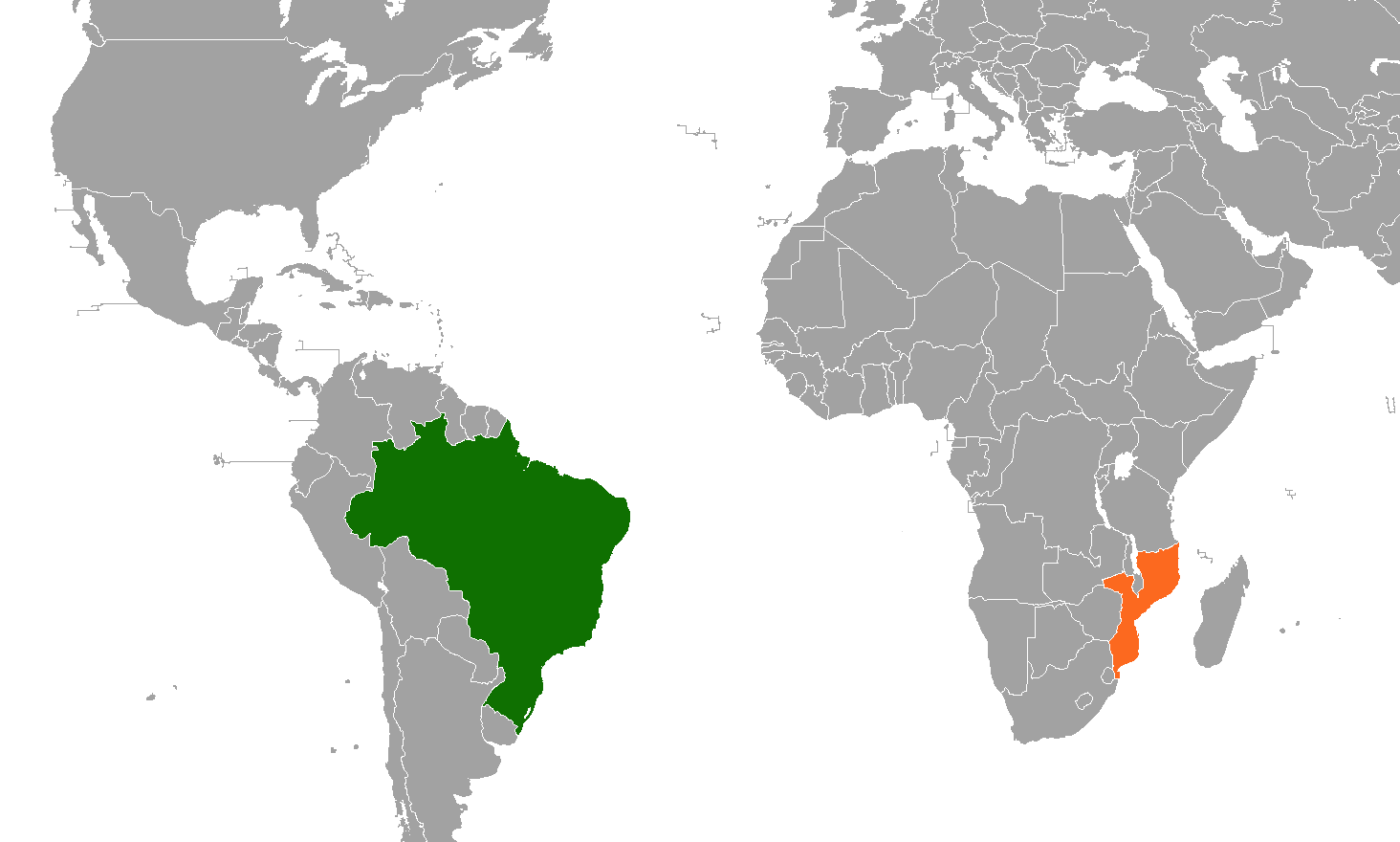
- Brazil: Mozambique

Brazil–Mozambique relations are the bilateral relations between Brazil and Mozambique. Both nations are members of the Community of Portuguese Language Countries, Group of 77 and the United Nations.

== History ==
Both Brazil and Mozambique were united for three hundred years as part of the Portuguese Empire. As part of the Portuguese Empire, Brazil received thousands of Mozambicans who arrived to the country as slaves. From 1815 to 1822, Mozambique was administered from Brazil during the Transfer of the Portuguese Court to Brazil.

From September 1964 - September 1974, Mozambique was at war with Portugal during its war of independence. In December 1973, Brazil voted in favor of the United Nations Resolution 3117 on the elimination of colonialism in Southern Africa. On 25 June 1975, Mozambique obtained its independence. On 15 November 1975, Brazil recognized and established diplomatic relations with Mozambique.

In March 1976, Brazil opened an embassy in the Mozambican capital of Maputo and in January 1998, Mozambique reciprocated the gesture by opening an embassy in Brasília. In 2000, Brazilian President Fernando Henrique Cardoso paid an official visit to Mozambique and attended the 3rd summit of the Community of Portuguese Language Countries being held in the Mozambican capital. In 2001, Mozambican President Joaquim Chissano paid an official visit to Brazil. Since then, there have been several high level visits between leaders of both nations.

== High-level visits ==
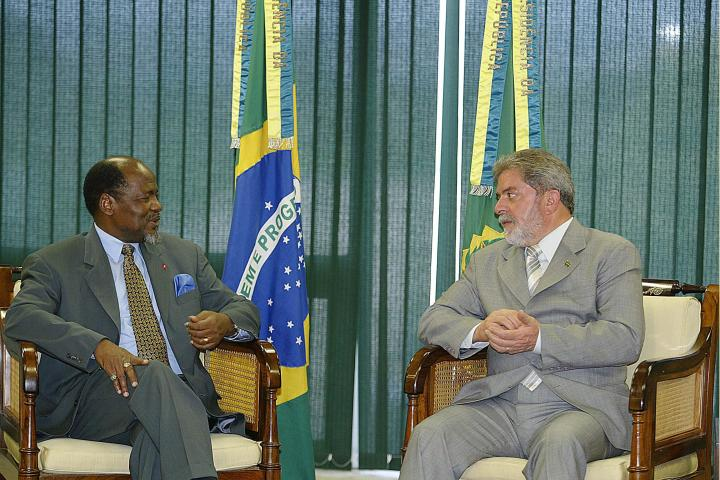
Brazilian President Luiz Inácio Lula da Silva meeting with Mozambican President Joaquim Chissano in Brasília, 2004

High-level visits from Brazil to Mozambique

- Foreign Minister Ramiro Saraiva Guerreiro (1980)
- President Fernando Henrique Cardoso (2000)
- President Luiz Inácio Lula da Silva (2003, 2008, 2010, 2025)
- Foreign Minister Celso Amorim (2003, 2005)
- President Dilma Rousseff (2011, 2012)
- Vice President Michel Temer (2012)
- Foreign Minister Mauro Vieira (2015)
- Foreign Minister Aloysio Nunes (2017)

High-level visits from Mozambique to Brazil

- President Joaquim Chissano (2001, 2002, 2004)
- President Armando Guebuza (2007, 2009)
- Foreign Minister Oldemiro Balói (2008, 2011, 2016)
- Prime Minister Aires Ali (2012)

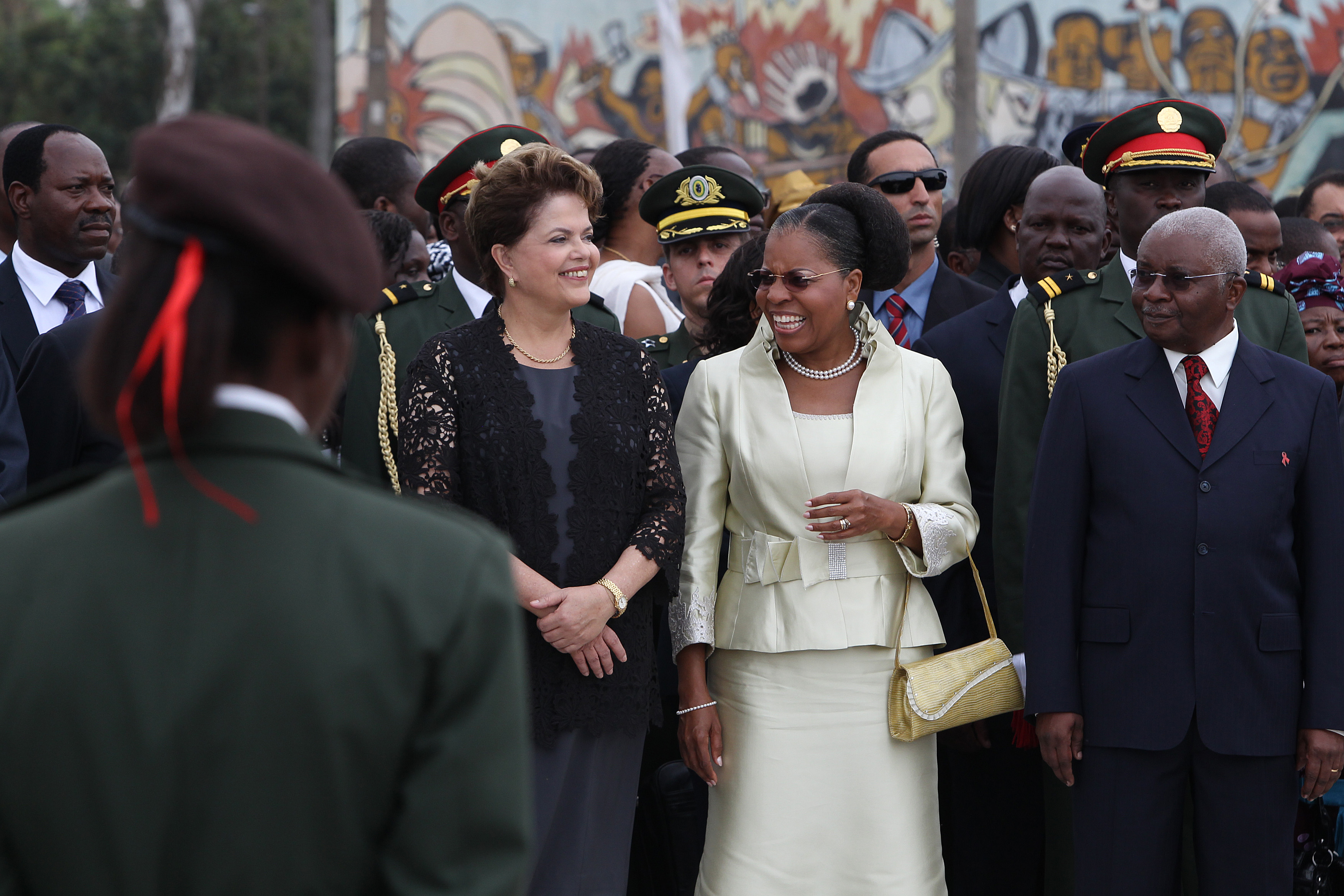
President Dilma Rousseff, President Armando Guebuza and First Lady Maria da Luz Guebuza in Maputo; 2011.

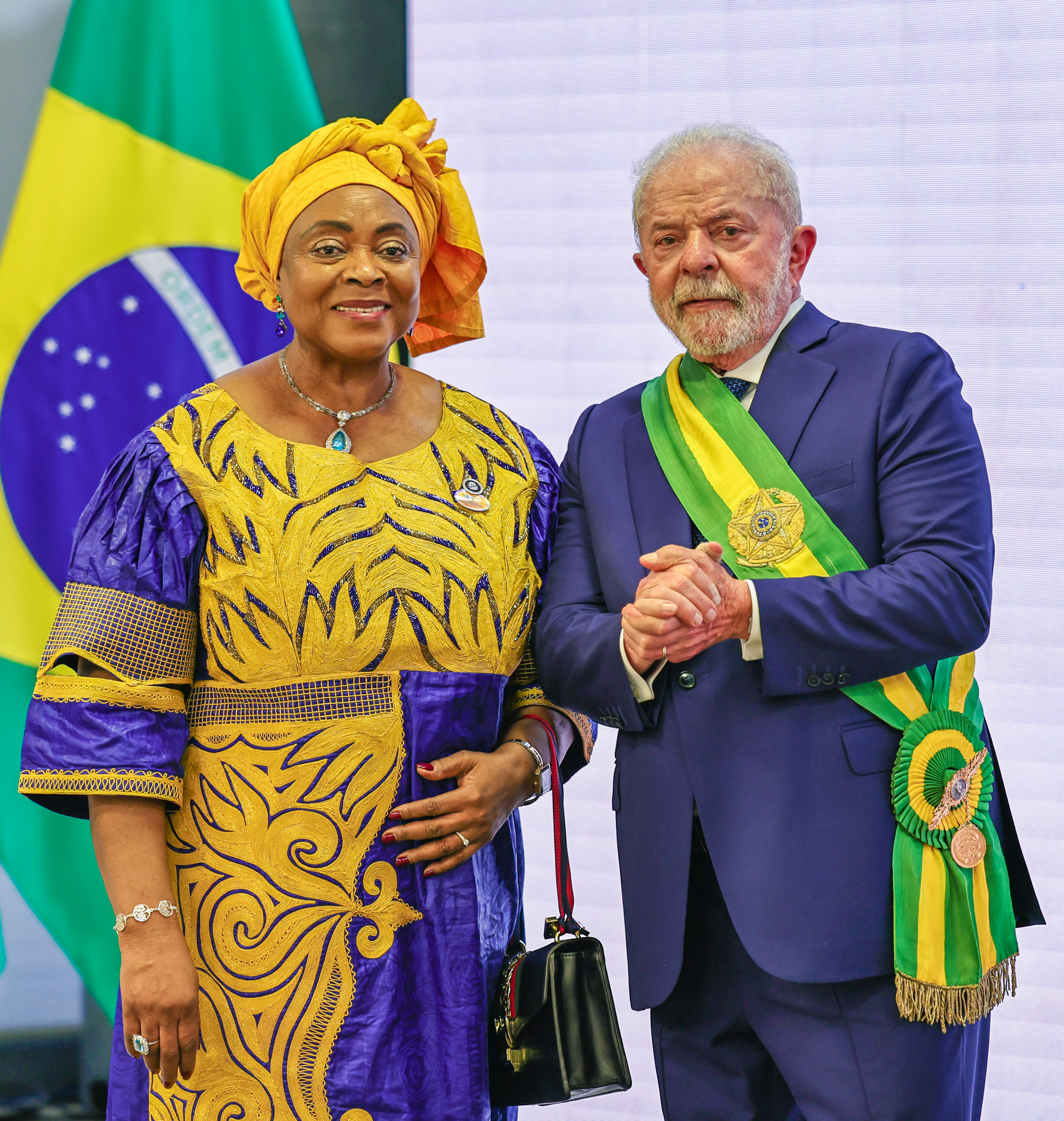
President Lula da Silva and President of the Assembly of Mozambique, Esperança Bias, in Brasília; 2023.

== Agreements ==
Brazil and Mozambique have signed several bilateral agreements such as agreements on cooperation in health, education, social policies and public security (2001). In 2010, both nations signed agreements on air service cooperation and for mutual recognition of driver's license. In 2015, both nations signed an agreement on cooperation and investment facilitation.

== Economic relations ==
In 2004, Brazil agreed to forgive 95% of Mozambique's debt to Brazil totaling US$280 million.

In 2022, trade between Brazil and Mozambique totaled US$89.7 million. In 2010, Brazil opened an anti-retroviral medicine plant in Mozambique. In 2016, Brazilian investments in Mozambique reached US$10 billion, mainly in the mining, construction and agriculture industries. Brazilian multinational companies such as Andrade Gutierrez, Odebrecht, Petrobras and Vale operate in Mozambique.

Mozambique is the largest recipient of Brazilian aid from the national aid agency Agência Brasileira de Cooperação.

== Resident diplomatic missions ==
- Brazil has an embassy in Maputo.
- Mozambique has an embassy in Brasília.

== See also ==
- Foreign relations of Brazil
- Foreign relations of Mozambique
- Lusophone Games
- United Kingdom of Portugal, Brazil and the Algarves

== Bibliography ==
- Abellán, Javier; Alonso, José Antonio (2017). The role of Brazil as a new donor of development aid in Africa. Africa, New Powers, Old Powers. University of Bologna.
