= Mozambique–Zimbabwe relations =

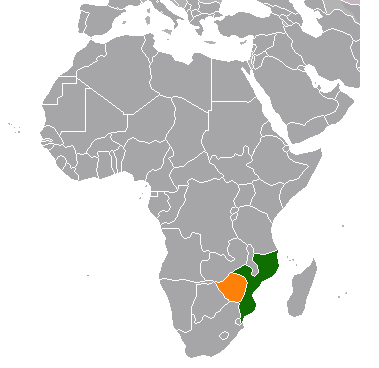

- Mozambique: Zimbabwe

Mozambique–Zimbabwe relations refers to the bilateral relationship between Mozambique and Zimbabwe, two neighbouring Southern African nations. Both nations are members of the African Union, United Nations, Southern African Development Community and the Non-Aligned Movement. The countries share a common border over 1,000 kilometres totaling over 10,000 kilometres. While they face occasional strains, leadership is strategically committed to maintain strong bilateral ties.

Relations between the leadership of the two countries developed in the period of anticolonial struggle when FRELIMO helped the Zimbabwe African National Union actions against the Rhodesia regime. ZANU received direct support from Mozambican citizens living along the border as well. After gaining independence in 1980 and until 1990 Zimbabwe provided military support to FRELIMO-led government in Mozambique in the fight against RENAMO during the Mozambican Civil War.

== See also ==
- Foreign relations of Mozambique
- Foreign relations of Zimbabwe

== Sources ==
- Clinarete Victoria Luis Munguambe (2020). "Nationalism and Exile in an Age of Solidarity: Frelimo–ZANU Relations in Mozambique (1975–1980)". In Jocelyn Alexander; JoAnn McGregor; Blessing-Miles Tendi (eds.). Transnational Histories of Southern Africa's Liberation Movements. Routledge. doi:10.4324/9780367854935. ISBN 9780367854935.
