= Japan–Mozambique relations =

- Japan: Mozambique

Japan–Mozambique relations refers to the bilateral relations between Japan and Mozambique. Japan has an embassy in Maputo, while Mozambique has an embassy in Tokyo. Foreign relations between the two nations are cordial, with Japan providing humanitarian aid and investment into Mozambique.

== History ==
Relations between Japan and Mozambique date back to the 16th century, when Yasuke, a Mozambique-born african samurai, became a retainer of Oda Nobunaga.

Diplomatic relations between Japan and Mozambique was established in 1977. Since 1977, several high-profile visits have happened in both countries. Mozambique prime minister Aires Ali visited Japan in 2012 along with five ministers of federal departments. Japanese prime minister Fumio Kishida visited Mozambique in 2023.

In 2024, Japan signed an agreement with Mozambique to donate $55.1 million to the country to buy vehicles for police forces in the country and for funds towards the Nacala Power Plant.

== Trade ==
In 2022, Japan exported $196 million' worth of goods to Mozambique, with the largest value export being cranes ($47.4 million worth). Mozambique exported $160 million worth of goods to Japan, with the largest value export being coal briquettes.

== See also ==
- Foreign relations of Japan
- Foreign relations of Mozambique
- Japanese foreign policy on Africa
