= Finland–Mozambique relations =

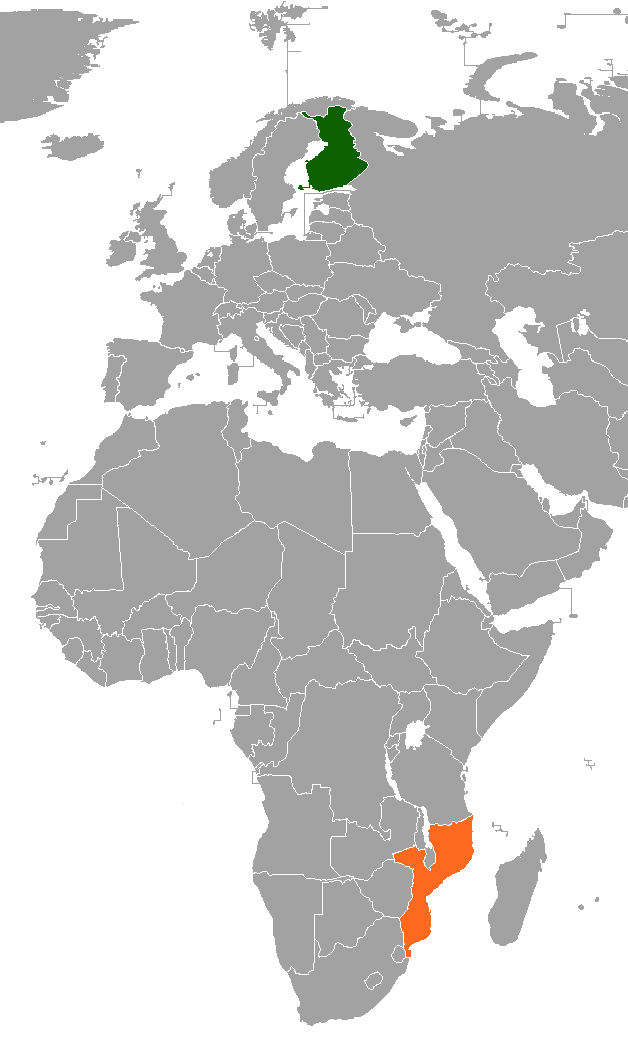
- Finland: Mozambique

Finland–Mozambique relations refers to the bilateral relations between Finland and Mozambique. Finland recognised Mozambique on July 4, 1975. Both countries established diplomatic relations on July 18, 1975. Mozambique is represented in Finland through its embassy in Stockholm, Sweden. Finland has an embassy in Maputo. In November 2008, Finland's President Tarja Halonen called her country's relationship with Mozambique "excellent".

== Aid to Mozambique ==
Since 1987, Mozambique has been one of Finland's main partner countries for development aid, with Mozambique receiving 23 million Euros in 2008. In 2009, Finland's aid contribution to Mozambique increased to 26.6 million Euros. In 2008, development aid was used in the agriculture, education and health sectors. In October 2008, Finnish Minister for Foreign Trade and Development Paavo Väyrynen visited Mozambique to discuss development and trade.

Much of Finland's aid was directed towards rural development, specifically with the goals of increasing agricultural productivity and increasing farmers’ income.

== See also ==
- Foreign relations of Finland
- Foreign relations of Mozambique
