= Mozambique–Turkey relations =

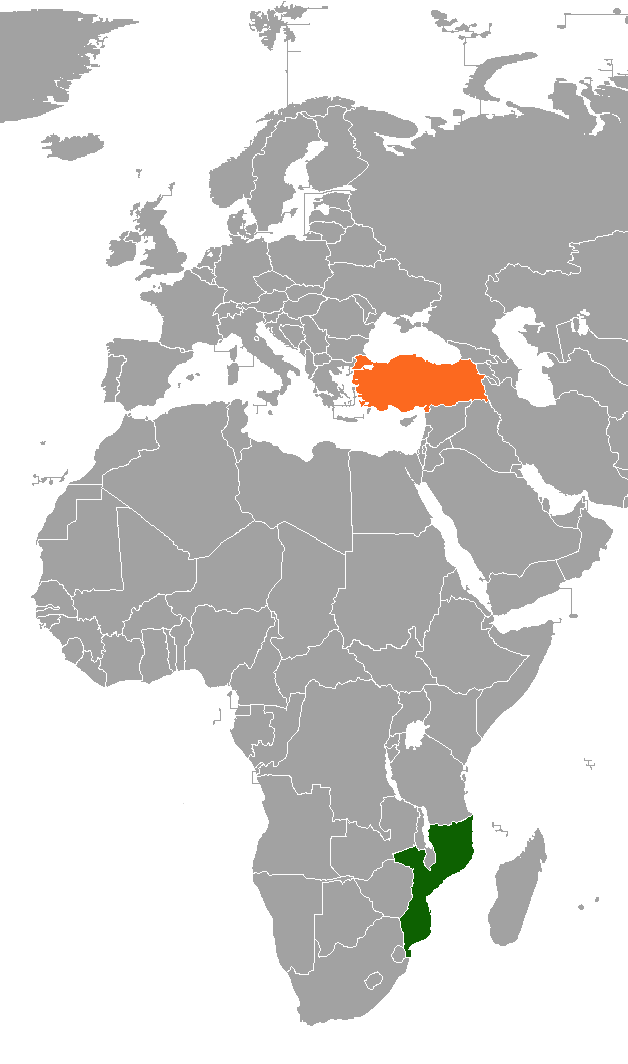
- Mozambique: Turkey

Mozambique–Turkey relations are the bilateral relations between Mozambique and Turkey. Turkey has had an embassy in Maputo since March 15, 2011, while Mozambique's ambassador in Rome is also accredited to Turkey.

== Diplomatic relations ==
Turkey was initially sympathetic to Eduardo Mondlane, a U.S-educated moderate socialist who founded Frente de Libertação de Moçambique to launch an armed struggle against the Portuguese even though Turkey continued to outwardly support NATO-ally Portugal. Relations between Mozambique and Turkey became very tense when Samora Machel, a hardline Marxist, became Frente de Libertação de Moçambique’s leader. Under Samora Machel, Frente de Libertação de Moçambique was notorious for giving the white Mozambicans the infamous “24/24 order”—leave in 24 hours with 24 kilos (or 53 pounds) of belongings—and nationalized most large private and church holdings. With Soviet assistance, Samora Machel persecuted northern tribes and the Catholic Church and was responsible for between 10,000 and 100,000 deaths at that time.

Following a diplomatic thaw between Samora Machel and the U.S. Reagan in 1985, Turkey started to provide Mozambique with economic assistance, which continued after Samora Machel's successor Joaquim Chissano sped up the liberalization of the economy and announced the end of the Marxist system.

== Economic relations ==
- Trade volume between the two countries was US$153 million in 2019.
- Turkish FDI accounts for 19% of the total FDI in Mozambique.

== See also ==
- Foreign relations of Mozambique
- Foreign relations of Turkey
