= Denmark–Mozambique relations =

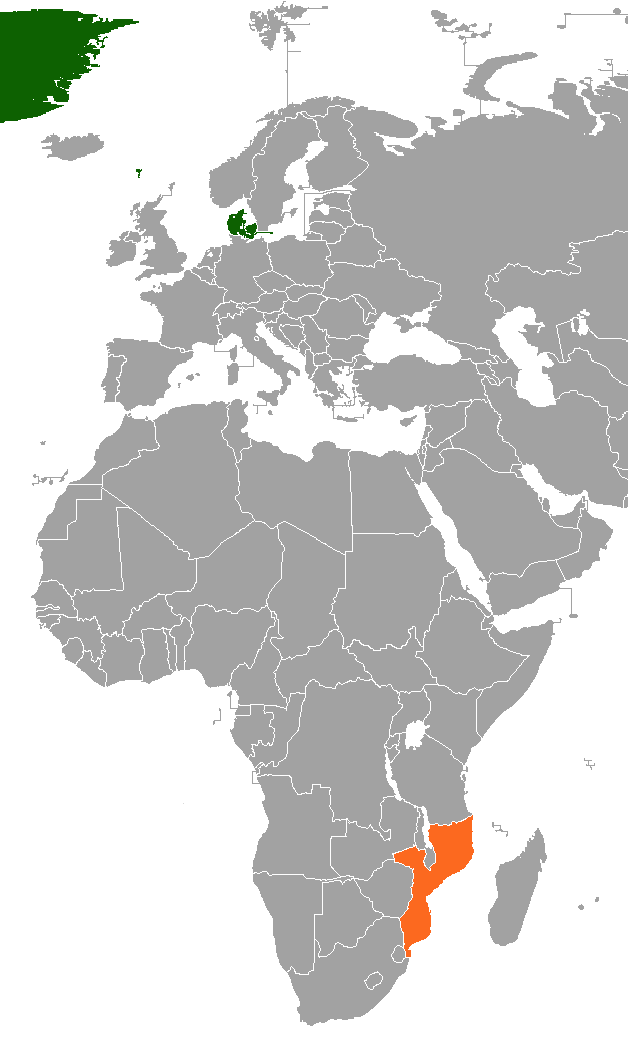
- Denmark: Mozambique

Denmark–Mozambique relations refers to the bilateral relations between Denmark and Mozambique. Denmark has an embassy in Maputo, and Mozambique is represented in Denmark, through its embassy in Stockholm, Sweden with an honorary consulate in Copenhagen. Diplomatic relations were established on 26 June 1975, but relations date back to before Mozambique achieved independence. The Danish Institute for Human Rights has worked with Mozambique since 1997. In 2000, Denmark signed an agreement with Finance Minister Luisa Diogo about implementation of mechanisms.

== Development assistance ==
Danish bilateral development cooperation with Mozambique started in the 1970s, with an aid programme to the Mozambican People's Republic. The programme supported agriculture and water supply. Humanitarian assistance was also a part of the aid programme. From 1989 to 1991, Denmark and Mozambique was discussing the cooperation in industry, energy, fisheries and transport. Denmark assisted Mozambique with fisheries, education and health in the city Tete. During the period from 1992 to 2006, assistance amounted about $700 million.

In a five-year period starting from 2006, Denmark assisted Mozambique with 315 million DKK to the agricultural sector and 57,5 million to the justice sector.

Environmental cooperation started in 1992 and ended in 2006.

"The overall purpose of the evaluation is to assess how Danish aid has responded to the rapidly changing circumstances in the aid context and development needs in Mozambique – not just through its choice of modalities but as much through its choice of partners, time perspectives, geographical and institutional focus, etc? What lessons can be learned from the Danish support that may be useful for the future development assistance to Mozambique and other countries?"

== High level visits ==
Danish Prime Minister Anders Fogh Rasmussen visited Mozambique in September 2005. President of Mozambique Armando Emilio Guebuza visited Denmark in October 2008. During the visit he met Danish Prime Minister Anders Fogh Rasmussen, Queen Margrethe II and Development Minister Ulla Tørnæs

== See also ==
- Foreign relations of Denmark
- Foreign relations of Mozambique
