= France–Mozambique relations =

- France: Mozambique

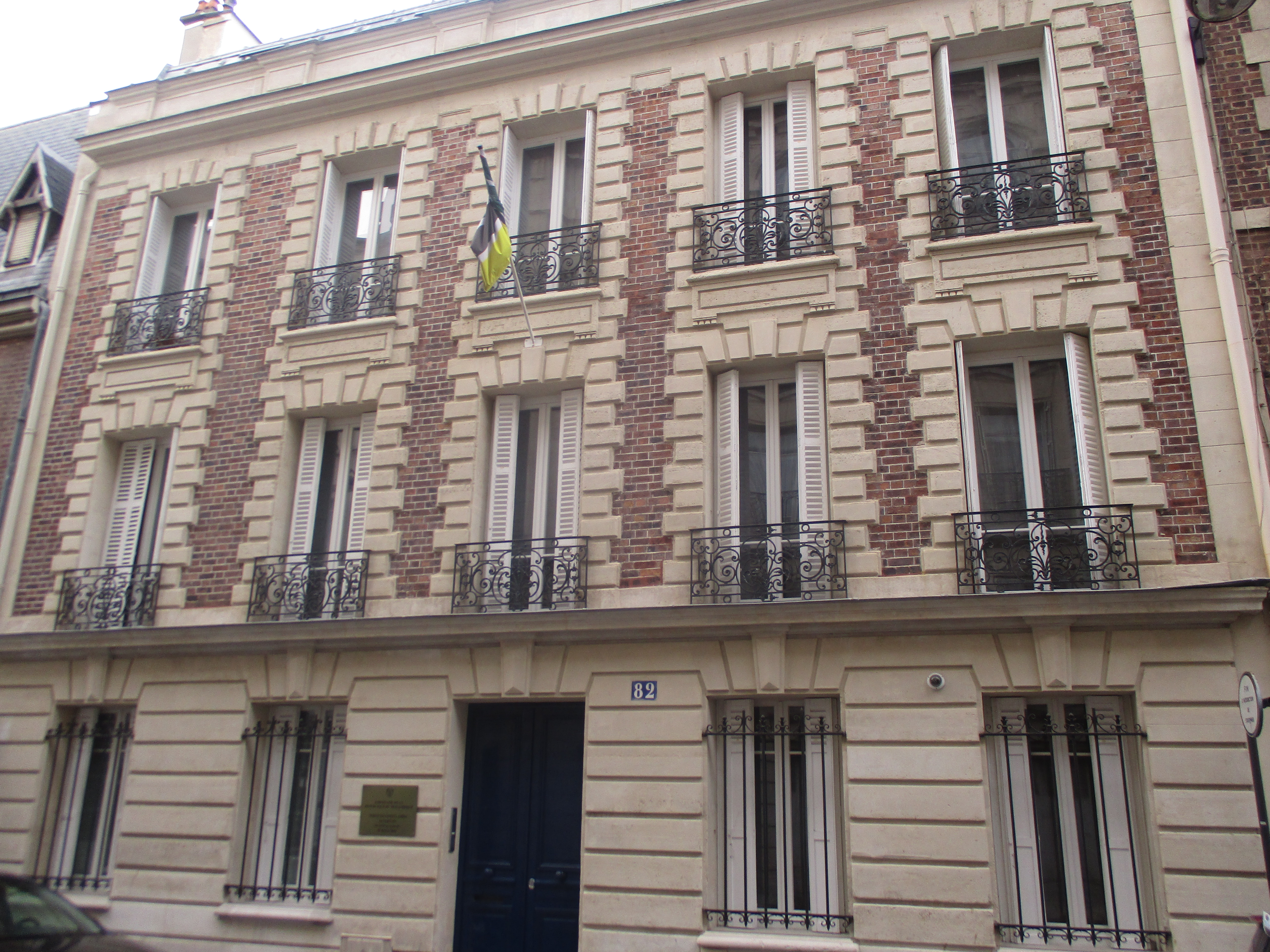
Embassy of Mozambique in Paris

France–Mozambique relations are the bilateral relations between France and Mozambique.

France has an embassy in Maputo at 2361 Avenue Julius Nyerere. Since September 2015, the French ambassador to Mozambique is Bruno Clerc. The embassy also handles France's diplomatic relations with Eswatini (formerly Swaziland).

Mozambique has an embassy in Paris at 82 Rue Laugier. The Mozambican ambassador to France is Alberto Maverengue Augusto.

France and Mozambique share a maritime border via the French Southern and Antarctic Lands.

== See also ==
- Foreign relations of France
- Foreign relations of Mozambique
