= Kenya–Mozambique relations =

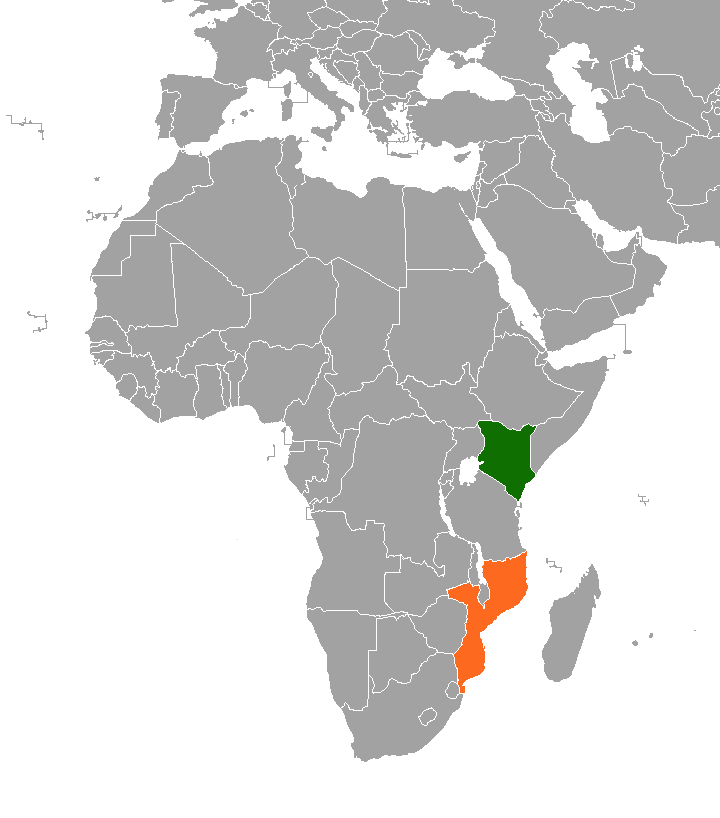
- Kenya: Mozambique

Kenya–Mozambique relations are bilateral relations between Kenya and Mozambique. Both nations are members of the African Union, Commonwealth of Nations and the United Nations.

== History ==
Kenya and Mozambique established relations in 1975. However, numerous cultural interactions happened between people from both nations before then. There are also many people from Mozambique who have settled in Kenya. With the most notable group being the Makonde.

President Kenyatta visited Mozambique in 2018 to bolster relations between Kenya and Mozambique. He held talks with Mozambican President Nyusi. Kenya's president agreed to scrap visa requirements for Mozambican nationals visiting Kenya. He also said that plans were already being made for a Kenyan consulate to be opened in Maputo which would be upgraded to a fully fledged mission by 2019.

During President Nyusi's state visit to Nairobi in November 2018 a visa waiver agreement was signed between Kenya and Mozambique.

In August 2023, William Ruto made his first state visit to Mozambique at the invitation of Filipe Nyusi.

== Cooperation ==
In October 2014, Transport ministers from both countries signed deals to allow private airlines with local ownership to fly between both countries. This was aimed at reducing airfare costs between both countries thus increasing trade.

The Kenyan Transport secretary was keen on implementing the African open skies agreement. Before the deal only Kenya Airways and LAM Mozambique Airlines were allowed to ply the route.

== Trade ==
In 2017, Kenya exported goods worth KES. 1.23 billion (US$12 million) compared to imports of KES. 3.17 billion (US$31 million).

== Resident diplomatic missions ==
- Kenya has a high commission in Maputo.
- Mozambique has a high commission in Nairobi.

== See also ==
- Foreign relations of Kenya
- Foreign relations of Mozambique
