= Mozambique–Russia relations =

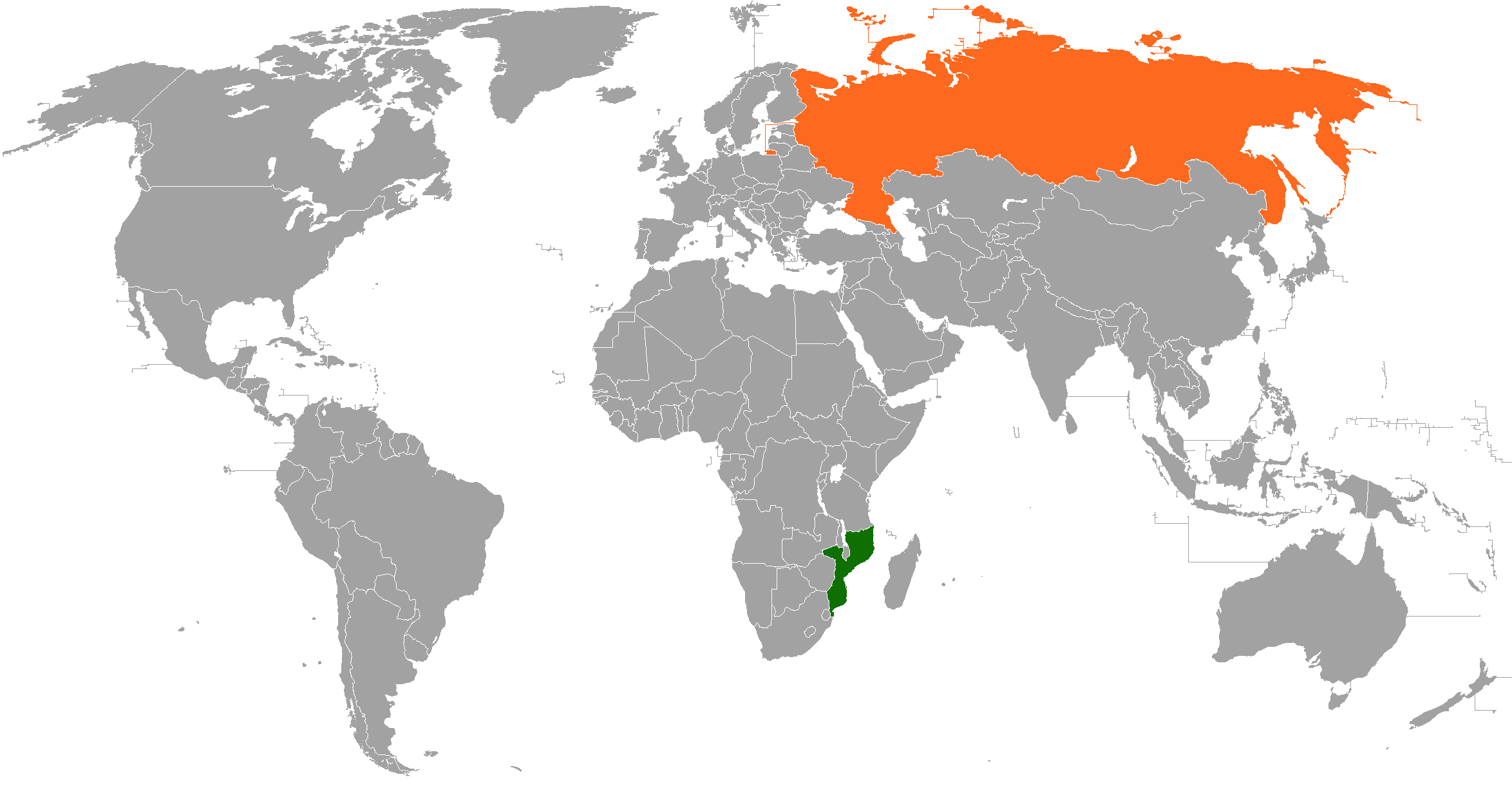
- Mozambique: Russia

Mozambique–Russia relations (Russian: Российско-мозамбикские отношения) date back to the 1960s, when Russia began to support the struggle of Mozambique's Marxist-oriented FRELIMO party against Portuguese colonialism. Most leaders of the FRELIMO party were trained in Moscow. Diplomatic relations were formally established on 25 June 1975, soon after Mozambique gained its independence from Portugal. In June 2007, both Russia and Mozambique signed an agreement on economic cooperation. Russia has an embassy in Maputo while Mozambique has an embassy in Moscow, Russia.

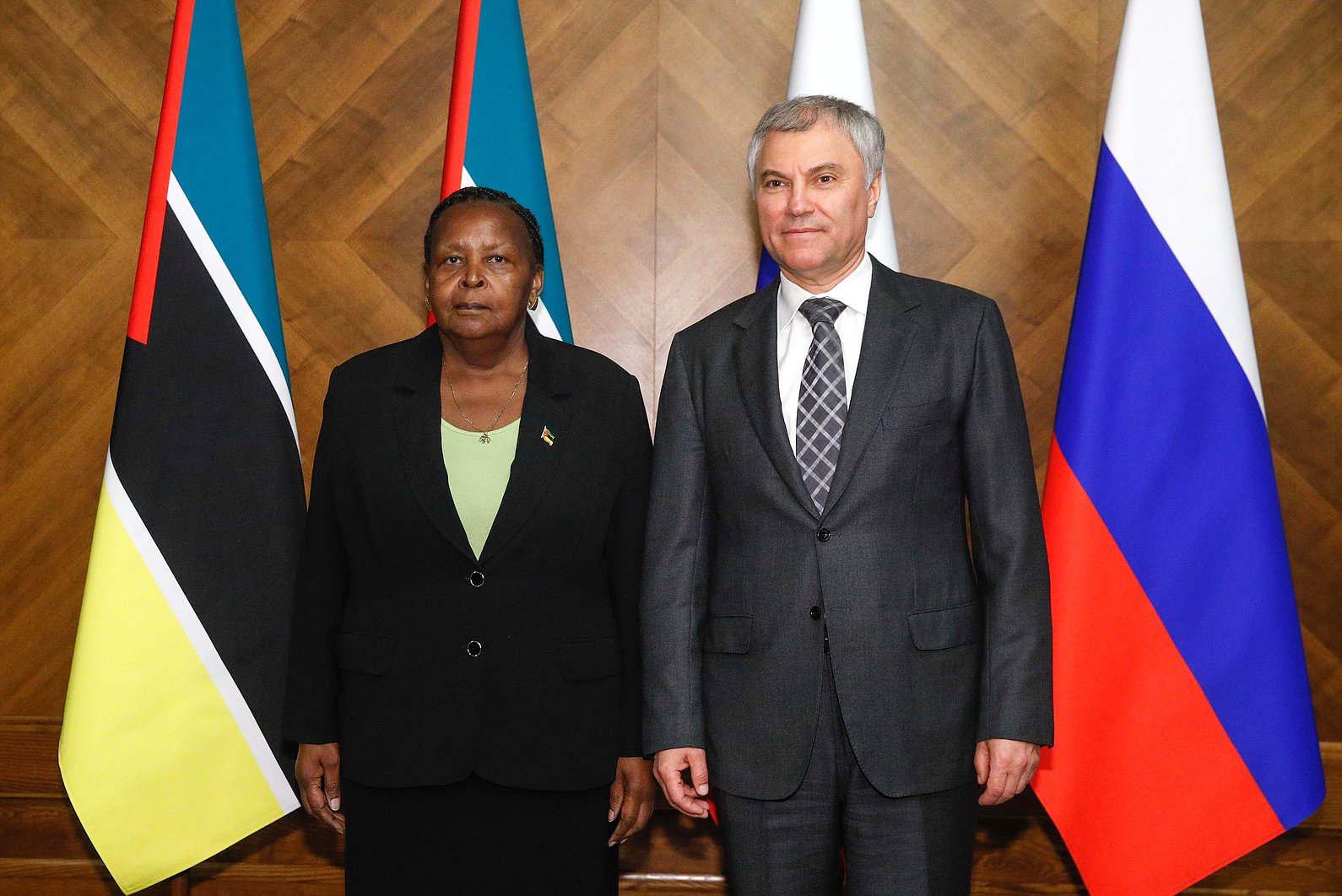
Esperança Bias with Vladimir Putin's close associate Vyacheslav Volodin in Moscow, Russia, 26 April 2023

== Security cooperation ==
During a visit to Maputo by Russian Foreign Minister Sergey Lavrov, it was announced that Russia would increase counter-terrorism cooperation with Mozambique.

== Energy ==
In 2015, Rosneft was awarded three licenses to extract natural gas near the Rovuma basin, in partnership with ExxonMobil.

== See also ==
- Foreign relations of Mozambique
- Foreign relations of Russia
- List of ambassadors of Russia to Mozambique
