= Canada–Mozambique relations =

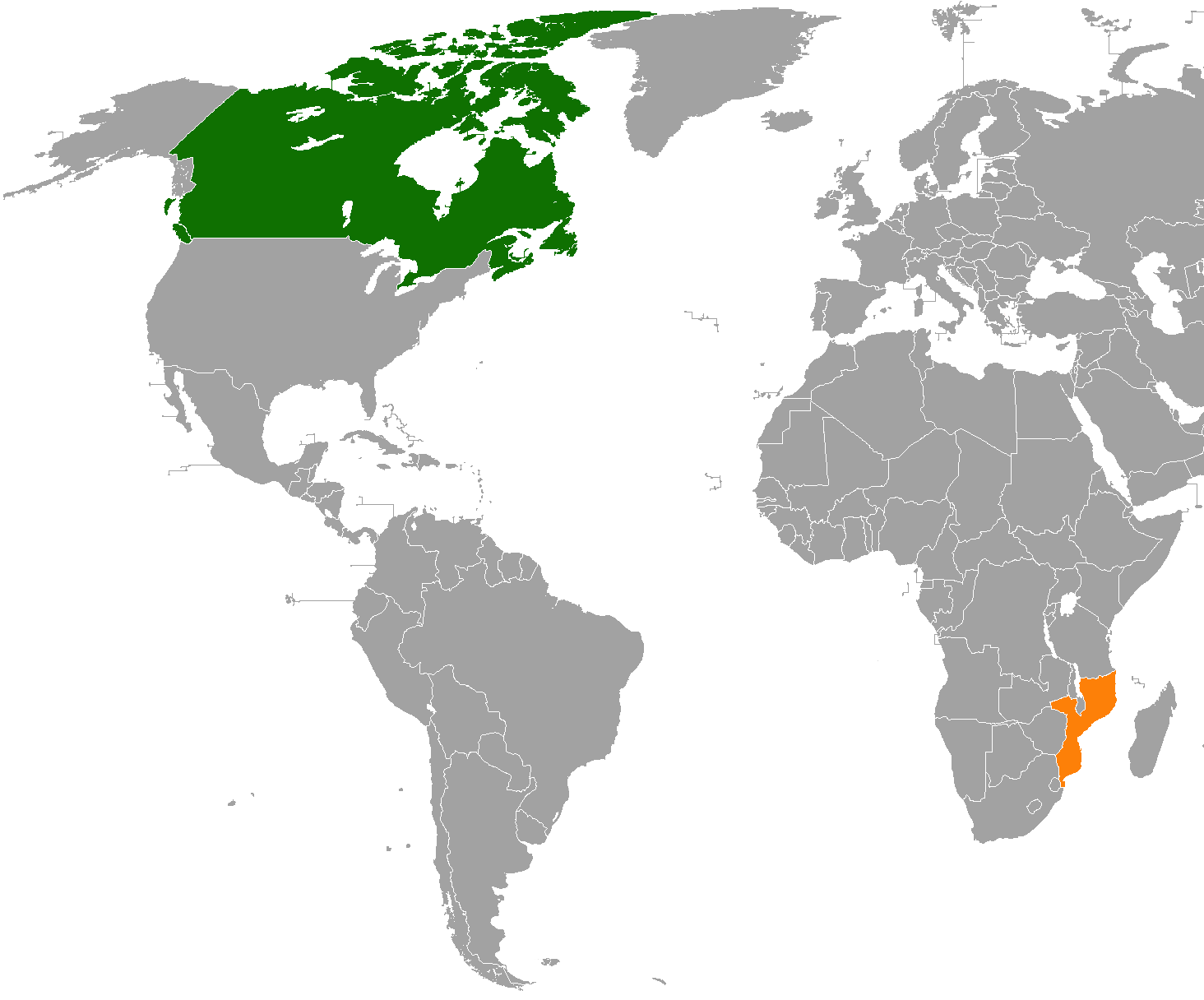

- Canada: Mozambique

Diplomatic relations between Canada and Mozambique began in 1975 after Mozambique became an independent country. Since gaining independence, Canada and Mozambique have engaged in peaceful diplomatic relations.

Canada has a high commission in Maputo, Mozambican representation in Canada is through the High Commission of Mozambique to Canada, located in Washington D.C.

== Economic trade ==
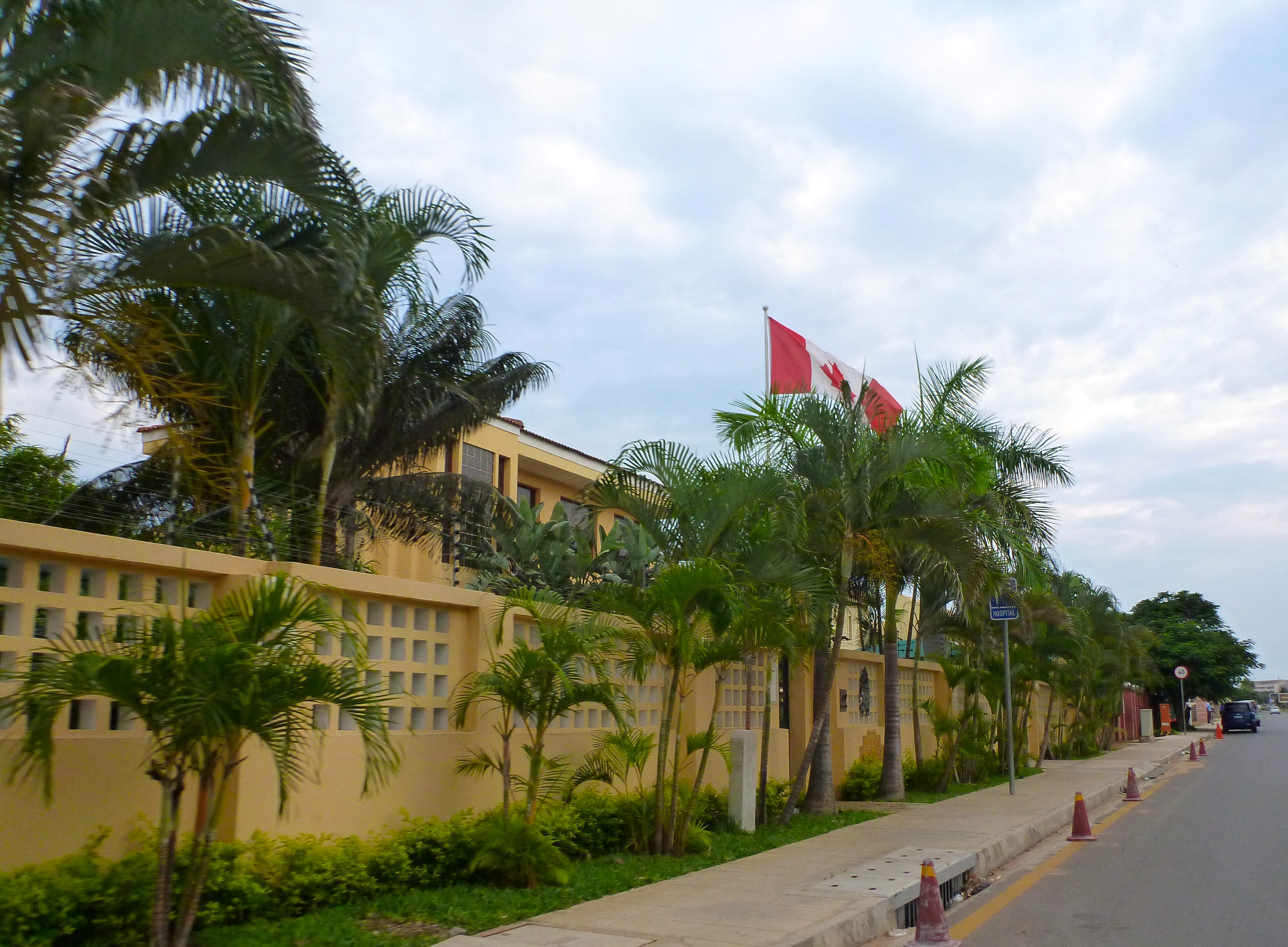
High Commission of Canada in Maputo

Trade between Canada and Mozambique is limited, however in future years is growing. The total amount of two-way trade between the two nations in 2008 was $13.3 million. Canada primarily exports wheat and clothing and textiles while 75% Mozambican exports to Canada is tobacco. In recent years, Canadian mining companies have invested in Mozambique and may continue to expand in the coming years.

== Peacekeeping ==
Canada has participated in peacekeeping missions from 1992 to 1994 as part of the United Nations (U.N.) operation ONUMOZ after Mozambique's 15-year civil war. Canada and 39 other countries from around the world contributed 6,625 military personnel in operation ONUMOZ. Canada and the United Nations monitored Mozambique to implement the General Peace Agreement signed between the Republic of Mozambique and the Resistência Nacional Moçambicana, which included protecting transportation routes, ensuring the ceasefire and monitoring the electoral process.

== Foreign Aid ==
=== Aid Effectiveness Agenda ===
The Aid Effectiveness Agenda is a program made by the Government of Canada to make its International aid more "efficient, focused, and accountable." This was achieved through focusing on specific countries. The Canadian International Development Agency (CIDA) chose 20 countries that met three sets of criteria: Needs, Ability to benefit meaningfully from Canada's assistance, Alignment with Canada's foreign policy. The Agenda also included 3 priority themes: children and youth, food security and economic growth which are all employed in CIDA's efforts towards Mozambique. In Mozambique's case, Canada is "one of the lead bilateral donors".

=== Canadian International Development Agency ===
Mozambique was designated as one of 20 'focus countries' in 2009 as part of its Aid Effectiveness Agenda. CIDA supports the Government of Mozambique's Poverty Reduction Strategy Paper, which outlines "economic development, including agriculture, human capital (education and health)[and] governance (including efficient use of public resources)." CIDA's efforts are categorized in the themes of children and youth and economic growth. Mozambican children are supported through increase in education quality and access to health services, including response to the HIV/AIDS crisis. At the 2010 G8 Conference, Mozambique was named one of 10 Muskoka Initiative countries, supporting maternal, child and neonatal health. Economic growth is promoted through support to the Mozambican national budget."

== See also ==
- Foreign relations of Canada
- Foreign relations of Mozambique
