= Mozambique–Spain relations =

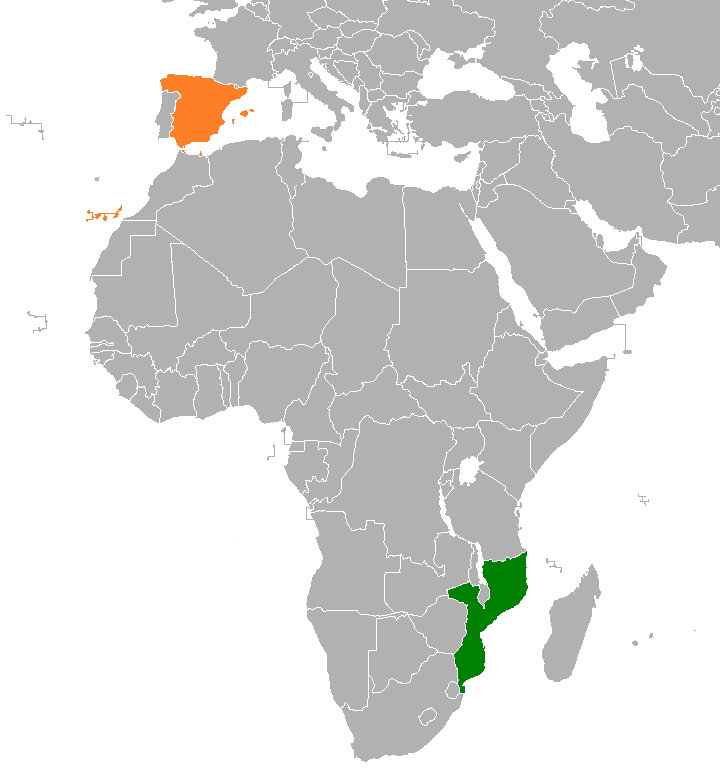
- Mozambique: Spain

Mozambique–Spain relations are the bilateral relations between these two countries. Mozambique has an embassy in Madrid. Spain has an embassy in Maputo.

== History ==
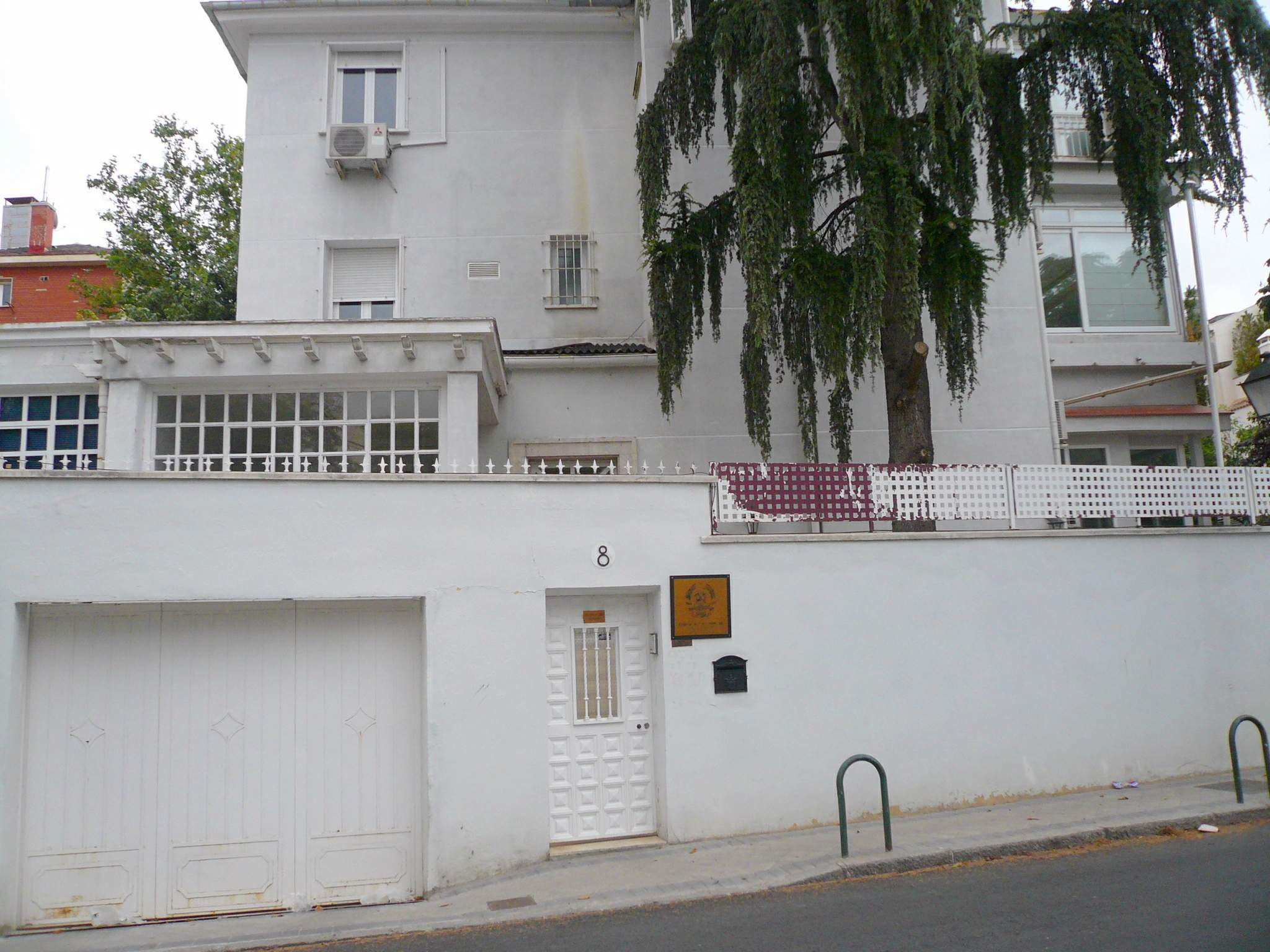
Embassy of Mozambique in Madrid

Full embassy-level diplomatic relations between both countries were agreed in May 1977. In 1987, in the wake of a visit to Spain of Mozambican foreign minister Pascoal Mocumbi, both governments agreed on the training (on behalf of the Guardia Civil) of Mozambican agents specialised in counter-terrorist operations in the countryside.

Following the official visit of President Guebuza to Spain in 2010, SEAEX traveled to Maputo in January 2015 to attend the inauguration of President Nyusi and transmitted an oral invitation to President Nyusi to visit Spain.

Bilateral relations have traditionally been at the heart of development cooperation activities. Mozambique is, in effect, one of the priority countries of the Spanish Cooperation. Since 1990 there is a Technical Cooperation Office in Maputo and six mixed commissions have been held until March 2016. Spain and Mozambique signed on November 27 of 2014 in Maputo the Country Association Framework (MAP) for the 2014-2016 period: activities have been concentrated in three areas: rural development, good governance and health, and the priority province will remain Cabo Delgado. The MAP establishes a referential financial framework of 46.5 million euro s as a donation through budgetary aid, which is the mode of execution preferred by the Mozambican authorities, programmatic assistance, co-financing of ONGD, the debt conversion program and projects through international organizations. Since 2009 the Spanish ODA for Mozambique has exceeded 190 million euros: Mozambique the main recipient of Spanish aid in Sub-Saharan Africa since 2011.

In March 2016, the Spanish Ministry of Foreign Affairs and Cooperation summoned the Mozambican ambassador in Spain in order to protest for the expulsion of a Spanish feminist who was performing activism against the decision to prohibit miniskirts in Mozambican schools as, following her detention, the Spanish national was deprived of consular assistance.

In 2017, Mozambique and Spain celebrated their 40 years of bilateral relations by signing an agreement on the training of Mozambican medical personnel.

== Economic relations ==
Despite its uncertainties, Mozambique's economic growth and large gas-related projects offer interesting perspectives for Spanish companies to take advantage of business and investment opportunities in the country. The high technological profile of Spanish companies in the engineering, infrastructure or telecommunications sectors, key to the country's development, is a comparative advantage. Also of interest is the Spanish business penetration in Portugal, where many Spanish companies have subsidiaries and branches, which can benefit from tax exemptions derived from the agreement to avoid double taxation between Portugal and Mozambique. The strength of Spanish companies in other African countries, for example Angola, another model of extractive economy, is an incentive to operate in Mozambique. Spanish exports to Mozambique remain at very low levels. The trade balance is characterized by presenting a strong deficit for Spain, which occupies the 71st position in the ranking of suppliers in Angola and 72 in the ranking of investors in the country.

== Cooperation ==
Mozambique has been a prioritary Sub-Saharan country for Spain vis-à-vis development aid. Development cooperation is a key area of the Spanish presence in Mozambique, whose general framework is included in the Basic Agreement on Scientific and Technical Cooperation and its Annex Protocol on the Statute of Experts on Cooperation, signed in December 1980. Under this Agreement, since 1989 successive meetings of the Mixed Commission have been held, the last of which in June 2005 in Maputo (VI Mixed Commission, 2005–2008).

Mozambique has been the sixth largest recipient of Spanish ODA in the world. Since 2004, a growing part of Spain's contribution has been channeled through its instruments such as general and sector budget support (in health and education). However, support for NGO has continued to represent the largest share among the funding AECID destinations.

== High-level visits ==
=== From Mozambique to Spain ===
Presidential and prime ministerial visits

- President Joaquim Chissano (1998)
- Prime Minister Luísa Diogo (2007)

High dignitaries

- Foreign Minister Chissano (1981)
- Foreign Minister Pascoal Mocumbi (1987)

=== From Spain to Mozambique ===
Royal visits

- Queen Sofía of Spain (2013)
- Queen Letizia of Spain (2019)

High dignitaries

- Foreign Minister Miguel Ángel Moratinos (2005)
- Vicepresident María Teresa Fernández de la Vega (2006)
- Secretary of State for Foreign Affairs Ignacio Ybáñez (2015)
- President of the Congress of Deputies Ana Pastor (2018)

== See also ==
- Foreign relations of Mozambique
- Foreign relations of Spain
