= José Antonio Alonso Rodríguez =

Spanish economist and a professor (born 1953)

José Antonio Alonso
- Born: José Antonio Alonso Rodríguez; 14 April 1953 (age 73); Spain

Academic background
- Education: Complutense University of Madrid, ECLAC, Bank of Spain

Academic work
- Discipline: Development economics, economic growth, international relations, development aid

José Antonio Alonso Rodríguez (born 14 April 1953) is a Spanish economist and a professor at Complutense University of Madrid. In addition to his academic work, he has played a number of policy roles. He is a member of the United Nations Committee for Development Policy and an expert of the Spanish Council for Development Cooperation. He has been an adjunct professor at Columbia University and the Economic Development Director of the Spanish Agency for International Development Cooperation.

Alonso is known for his work on development economics, growth and international economic relations. He is considered a leading international expert on international development cooperation along with Nancy Birdsall, José Antonio Ocampo and Rebeca Grynspan. He has edited several books on the subject, two of them in collaboration with the Columbia University professor José Antonio Ocampo: Global Governance and Rules for the Post-2015 Era. Addressing Emerging Issues in the Global Environment (Bloomsbury Academy, 2015) and Development Cooperation in times of crisis (Columbia University Press, 2012). His latest work focuses on the effectiveness of development aid and the relationship between institutions and economic development.

== Biography ==
José Antonio Alonso was born in Spain in 1953. He earned his undergraduate degree in economics with the best qualification from Complutense University of Madrid in 1975, when he was 22. Then he moved to America where he earned a degree in economic development from the United Nations Economic Commission for Latin America and the Caribbean. Back to Spain, he studied econometrics at the Bank of Spain and earned his PhD summa cum laude in economics from the Complutense University of Madrid in 1984. Since then, he occupied a number of chairs at the International University Menéndez Pelayo and the Iberoamerican Cooperation Institute, the present Spanish Agency for International Development Cooperation.

In 1994, he became a full professor at Complutense University of Madrid. One year later he was appointed as an expert at the Spanish Council for Development Cooperation. In 2006, he became a member of the United Nations Committee for Development Policy and he has been renewed in that position consequently since then. In 2011–2012 he was an adjunct professor at Columbia University of New York City.

== Selected works ==
=== Books (edited or co-edited) ===
- Global Governance and Rules for the Post-2015 Era. Addressing Emerging Issues in the Global Environment (2015), co-edited with José Antonio Ocampo. Bloomsbury Academy.
- Alternative Development Strategies for the Post-2015 Era (2013), co-edited with G. A. Cornia and R. Vos. Bloomsbury Academy.
- Development Cooperation in times of crisis (2012), co-edited with José Antonio Ocampo. Columbia University Press.

=== Articles ===
- "The determinants of institutional quality. More on the debate" (2013), with C. Garcimartín. Journal of International Development, 25, pp. 206–226.
- "Colonisation, Institutions and Development: New Evidence" (2011). Journal of Development Studies, Vol. 47 (7), 937-958.
- "Criterios y factores de calidad institucional: un estudio empírico" (2011). Revista de Economía Aplicada, Vol. 19 (55), pp. 5–32.
- "Inequality, institutions and progress: a debate between history and the present" (2007). CEPAL Review, 93, pp. 61–80.
- "El desarrollo como proceso abierto al aprendizaje" (2004). The European Journal of Development Research, Vol. 16 (4), pp. 845–867.
- "Nuevas direcciones en la política de ayuda al desarrollo" (2001). Revista de Economía Mundial, 5, pp. 11–45.
- "On Convergence and Balance of Payments External Constraint" (1999). International Journal of Development Planning Literature, Vol. 14 (4), pp. 483–497.
- "Growth and the external constraint: lessons from the Spanish case" (1999). Applied Economics, Vol. 31, pp. 245–253.
- "La restricción externa al crecimiento: nuevos enfoques" (1998). Revista de Economía Aplicada, Vol. 6 (16), pp. 5–37.
