= Mozambique–Portugal relations =

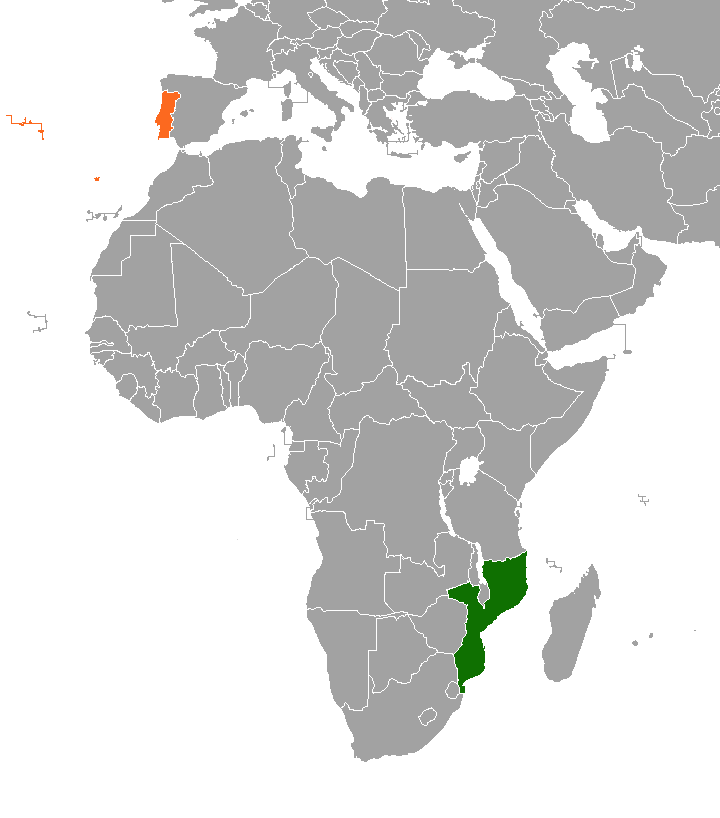
- Mozambique: Portugal

Mozambique–Portugal relations are the bilateral relations between the Republic of Mozambique and the Portuguese Republic. Both nations are members of the Community of Portuguese Language Countries and the United Nations.

== History ==
=== Portuguese colonization ===
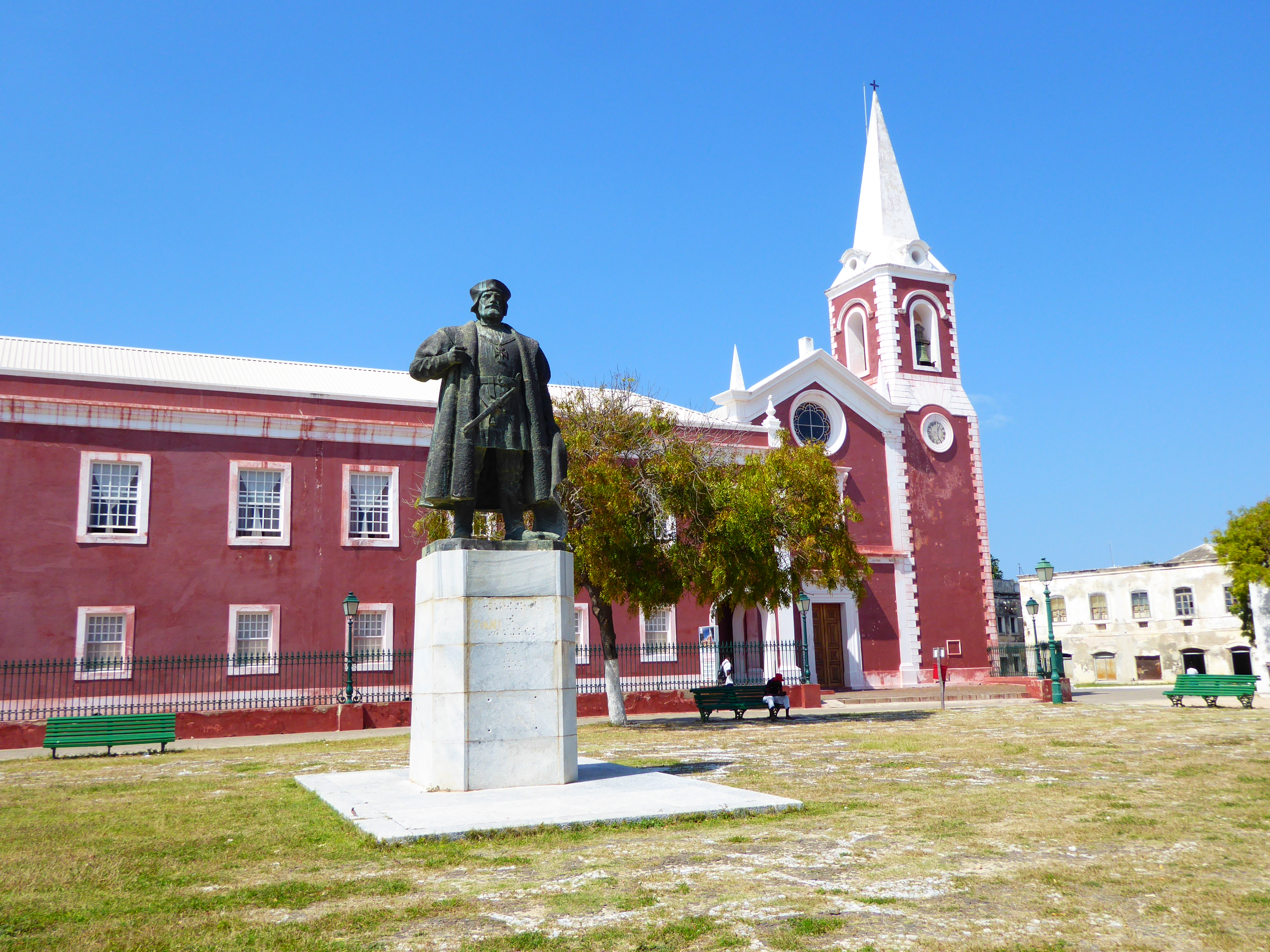
Statue of Vasco da Gama on the Island of Mozambique

In 1498, Portuguese explorer Vasco da Gama arrived on the Mozambican coast and established a colony on the Island of Mozambique. Explorer Lourenço Marques explored the area that is now Maputo Bay in 1544. Mozambique soon afterward became a Colony of Portugal and was incorporated into the Portuguese Empire. As part of the Portuguese Empire, thousands of Mozambicans were shipped to Brazil and arrived to the South American nation as slaves.

By the 1530s, small groups of Portuguese traders and prospectors penetrated the interior regions seeking gold. By the early 20th century the Portuguese had shifted the administration of much of Mozambique to large private companies, like the Mozambique Company, the Zambezia Company and the Niassa Company; controlled and financed mostly by the British. In 1932, Portugal broke-up the trading companies and imposed direct rule over the colony. By the 1960s, several thousands of Portuguese settlers arrived to Mozambique, attracted by the economic prospects in the country.

=== Independence ===
In the late 1950s, early 1960s, many African nations had gained their independence. In 1961, the Portuguese Colonial War began in Angola. The Mozambican War of Independence officially started on 25 September 1964 and would last 13 years.

Dissatisfaction with the government, economic situation in Portugal and the colonial wars, culminated on 25 April 1974, when the Carnation Revolution, a peaceful leftist military coup d'état in Lisbon, ousted the incumbent Portuguese government. With the change of government in Lisbon, many soldiers refused to continue fighting, often remaining in their barracks instead of going on patrol. The new head-of-government in Portugal, President António de Spínola, called for a ceasefire to the war in Mozambique. Negotiations between the Portuguese administration culminated in the Lusaka Accord signed on 7 September 1974, which provided for a complete hand-over of power to FRELIMO. As a result, thousands of Portuguese citizens left Mozambique.

Portugal formally granted independence to Mozambique on 25 June 1975.

=== Post independence ===
Diplomatic relations between the new Republic of Mozambique and Portugal were established on 25 June 1975, the same day of Mozambique's independence. In 1977, Mozambique opened its first resident embassy in Lisbon.

In November 1981, Portuguese President, António Ramalho Eanes, paid an official visit to Mozambique, becoming the first Portuguese head-of-state to visit the nation. In October 1983, Mozambican President, Samora Machel, paid a state visit to Portugal. There would be many official visits between leaders of both nations.

In July 1996, Mozambique and Portugal became founding members of the Community of Portuguese Language Countries.

In the four decades of diplomatic relations between Mozambique and Portugal, cooperation has registered a substantial increase, covering all areas of activity by both nations. In 2011, the first Bilateral Mozambique-Portugal Summit was held in Lisbon. In 2014 and 2018, the second and third Bilateral Summits took place both in Maputo. In 2019, the fourth Bilateral Summit took place in Lisbon and the fifth Summit was scheduled for Maputo in 2020.

== Bilateral agreements ==
Both nations have signed a few bilateral agreements such as an Agreement of Mutual Cooperation (1975); Agreement in Commercial, Economic and Health Cooperation (1981); Treaty of Friendship and Cooperation (1983); and an Agreement to hold bilateral summits to create a mechanism for political dialogue, at the highest level, on matters of common interest (2010).

== Transportation ==
There are direct flight between both nations with TAP Air Portugal.

== Resident diplomatic missions ==
- Mozambique has an embassy in Lisbon and a consulate-general in Porto.
- Portugal has an embassy in Maputo and a consulate-general in Beira.

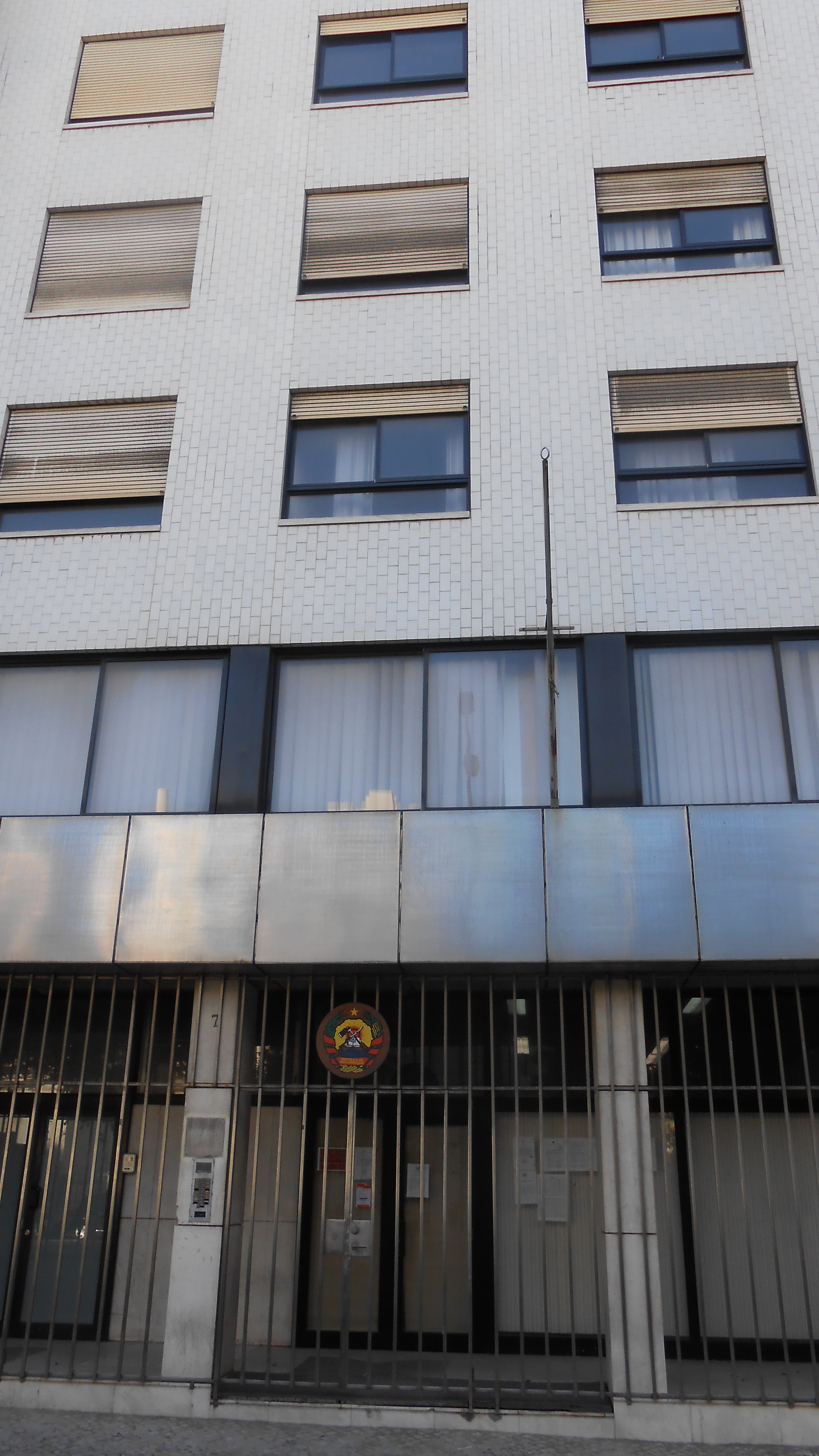
Embassy of Mozambique in Lisbon

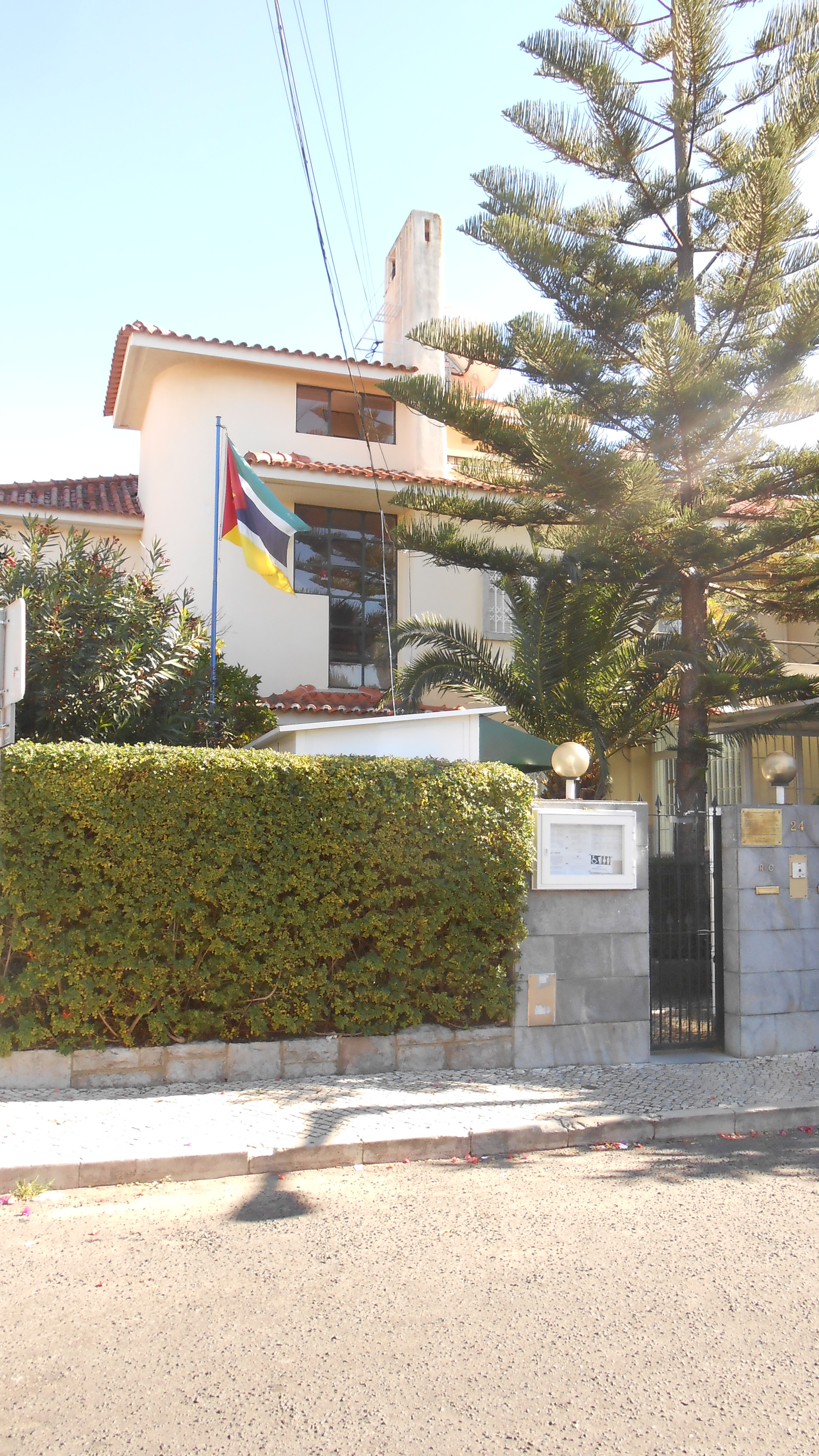
Consulate-General of Mozambique in Lisbon

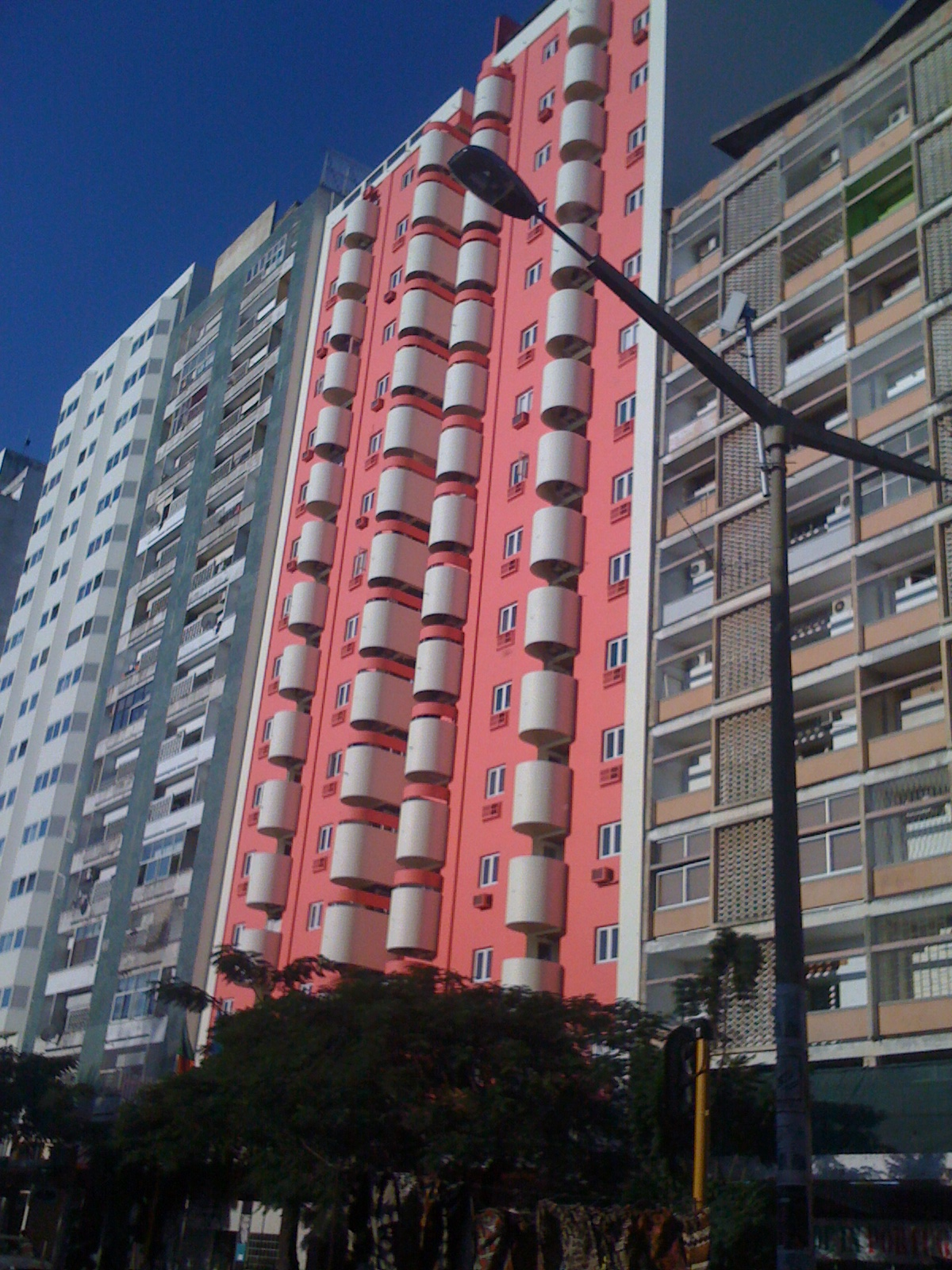
Embassy of Portugal in Maputo

== See also ==
- Immigration to Portugal
- Lusofonia Games
- Portuguese Mozambicans
