= Mozambique–South Africa relations =

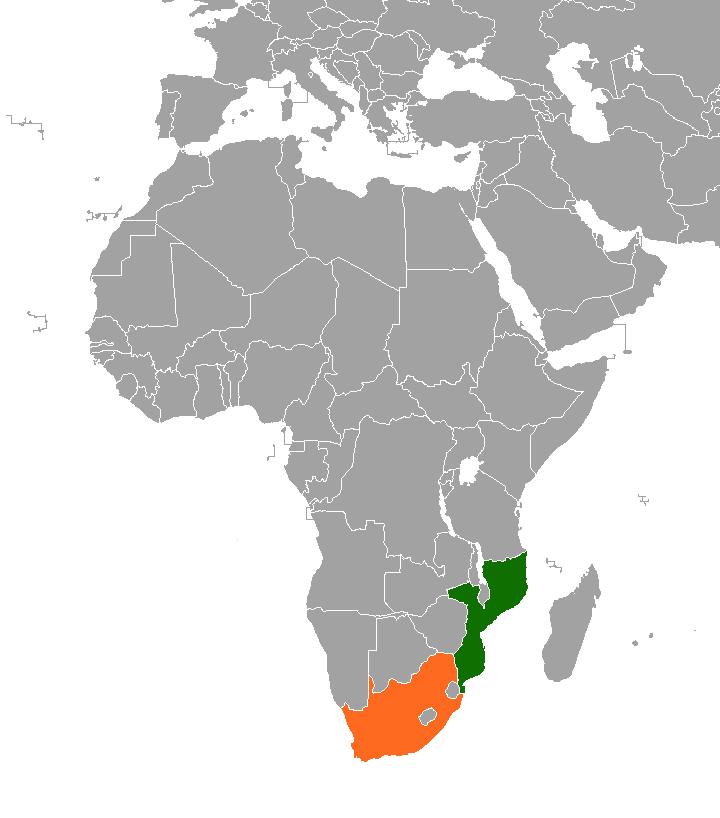
- Mozambique: South Africa

Mozambique–South Africa relations refers to the bilateral relations between Mozambique and South Africa. Mozambique has a high commission in Pretoria and consulates-general in Cape Town, Johannesburg and Mbombela. South Africa has a high commission in Maputo. Both countries are members of the African Union, Commonwealth of Nations and Non-Aligned Movement.

== History ==
Governmental relations began in 1928, during the colonial era, when the Union of South Africa entered into formal agreements with the Portuguese Empire for the colony of Portuguese East Africa (Mozambique) in regard to labour, transport and commercial matters. Graça Machel, the inaugural First Lady of Mozambique from 1975 to 1986, later married the first post-Apartheid-era President of South Africa, Nelson Mandela, on July 18, 1998, Mandela's 80th birthday. They remained married until Mandela's death on December 5, 2013, at the age of 95. She was previously married to Mozambique's first president, Samora Machel, who died in a plane crash on October 19, 1986, aged 53. Although South Africa is preponderant in the region in terms of economic resources and military might, Mozambique is considered a second-tier state in Southern Africa and a crucial partner for Pretoria.

=== Post-Apartheid ===
The South African National Defence Force has worked with the Mozambique Defence Armed Forces to combat the insurgency in Cabo Delgado. The SAS Drakensberg has also engaged in counter-piracy patrols off the coast of Mozambique.

== Resident diplomatic missions ==
- Mozambique has a high commission in Pretoria and a consulates-general in Cape Town, Johannesburg and Mbombela.
- South Africa has a high commission in Maputo.
