= Germany–Mozambique relations =

Bilateral relations

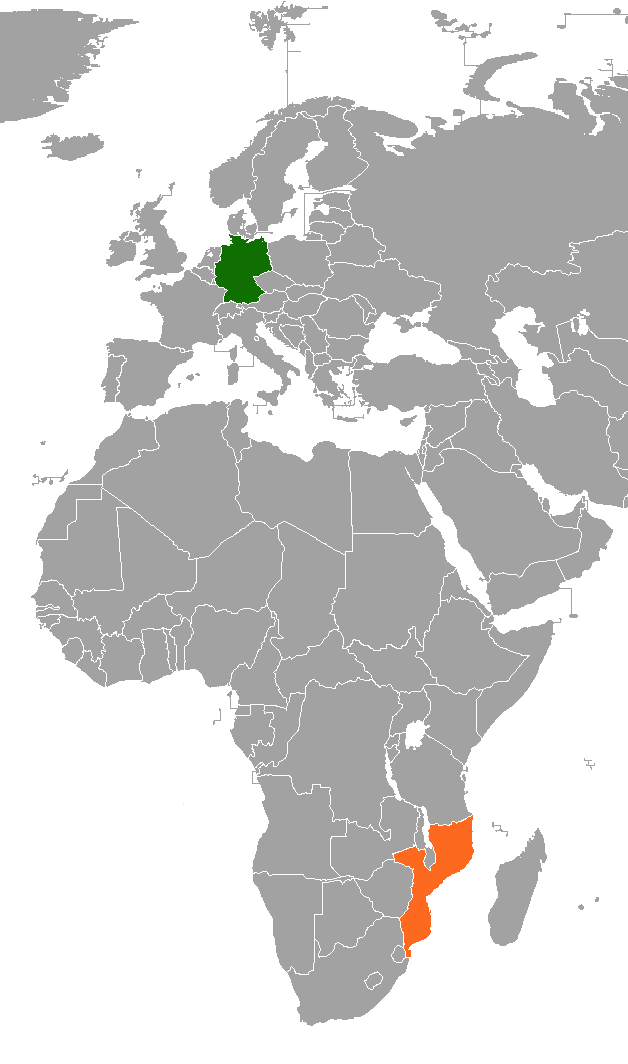

- Germany: Mozambique

Germany and Mozambique, have maintained diplomatic relations since Mozambique's independence in 1975. Since then, numerous visits by German politicians and business, commissions to Mozambique have followed, and a number of Mozambican politicians have visited the Federal Republic of Germany.

== History ==
=== Before 1975 ===
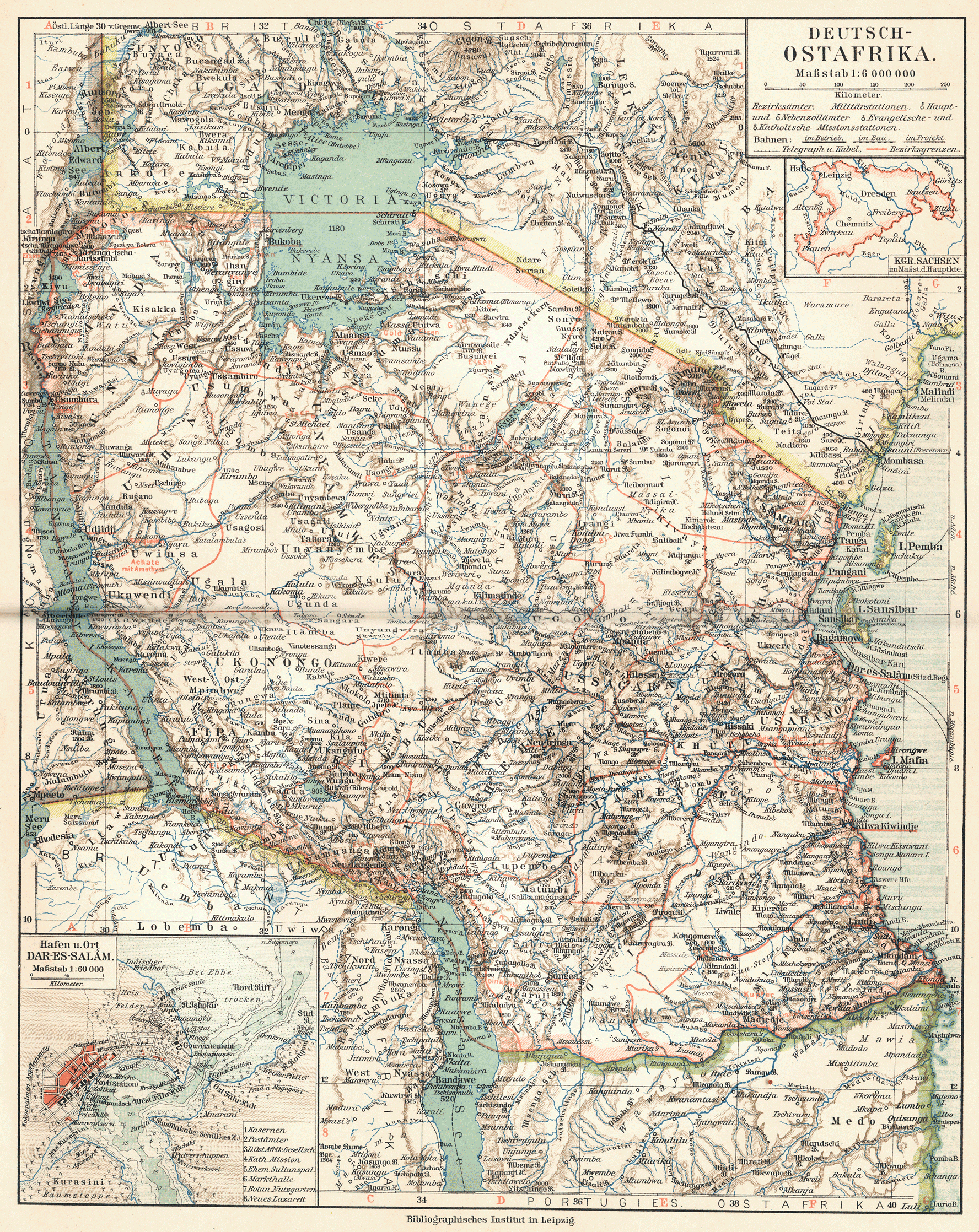
Map from 1905, showing the Kionga Triangle as part of German East Africa

Mozambique was a Portuguese colony after Vasco da Gama's arrival in 1498. The German Empire took possession of the adjacent territory to the north as German East Africa in 1885. After the Anglo-German Heligoland-Zanzibar Treaty in 1890, the German Empire also considered the Kionga Triangle in the extreme northeast of Portuguese East Africa (now Mozambique) as belonging to German East Africa, and occupied the area in 1894.

When World War I broke out in August 1914, Portugal was initially still neutral and did not receive a declaration of war from Germany until March 9, 1916. Portuguese troops then reoccupied the disputed Kionga Triangle.

At the end of World War I in East Africa, the remainder of the Schutztruppe for German East Africa retreated to Mozambican territory in November 1917 ahead of British forces. In September 1918, they moved on to Northern Rhodesia, where they surrendered on November 25, 1918, following news of the armistice in Europe.

The Kionga Triangle was finally granted to Portugal in the Versailles Peace Treaty of 1919.

In 1932, the Laurentina Brewery was founded, the first beer brewery in Mozambique. The recipe was developed by a German brewmaster who was recruited for the purpose in Germany and initially managed the fabrication in Mozambique.

Portuguese East Africa became the Portuguese Overseas Province of Mozambique in 1951 and gained independence in 1975, following the Carnation Revolution in Portugal.

=== After 1975 ===
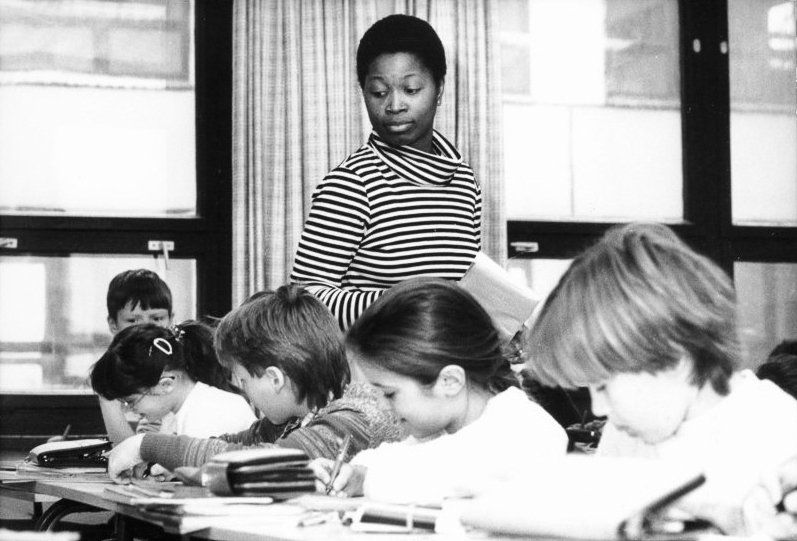
Mozambican student at the University of Education in Güstrow, teaching mathematics to class in Güstrow (1986).

The German Democratic Republic (GDR) was the first German state to recognize the young People's Republic of Mozambique, followed by the Federal Republic of Germany in 1976.

Mozambique and the GDR subsequently maintained intensive relations, and the country became a focus of GDR development aid. Thus, numerous Mozambicans studied here, and as of 1979, over 16,000 to about 22,000 contract workers came to the GDR. In total, the number of Mozambicans who studied or worked in the GDR is estimated at 26,000.

Within the framework of scientific and technical cooperation, numerous GDR technicians were also sent to Mozambique to work on various projects for the reconstruction and development of the country. In the process, the foreign aid workers, whose expertise made an essential contribution to the stabilization and development of the newly independent, socialist-oriented country, repeatedly became the target of planned attacks. These attacks were carried out by RENAMO, a rebel group largely under the control of the South African military intelligence service of the time, which was used to destabilize Mozambique. The Unango attack on December 6, 1984, was the worst of these incidents. Seven GDR citizens died as a result. RENAMO received considerable material and moral support from a right-wing conservative network around then-Bavarian Prime Minister Franz Josef Strauß, who at times pursued his own foreign policy, parallel to the German government's foreign policy aimed at détente. This West German network of supporters of RENAMO ranged from representatives of the Hanns-Seidel Foundation to intelligence actors.

After the end of the People's Republic of Mozambique in 1990 and the Mozambican Civil War in 1992, the now reunified Germany participated in the reconstruction in Mozambique. A large number of reciprocal high-level visits have taken place since then.

However, the problem of the Madgermanes, the approximately 15,000 contract workers whose wages were to be paid partly locally and partly in Mozambique, remained unsolved. They came to Germany after a state treaty between the GDR and Mozambique in 1979. After reunification in 1990, however, the Federal Republic did not adopt the contract and expelled the Mozambicans with severance payments. They are now waiting for the outstanding portions of their wage payments, which the German government said they should receive from the Mozambican government. Claims arising from their social security contributions paid in Germany also remain in dispute. Since then, those affected have regularly demonstrated in Maputo, including briefly occupying the German Embassy in 2004.

In 2000, the case of the Mozambican Alberto Adriano, who was beaten to death by neo-Nazis in Dessau, attracted international attention.

== Education ==
There are a large number of cooperation and funding programs between the two countries, particularly through the German Academic Exchange Service (DAAD). In addition, the DAAD promotes student exchanges. In 2015, for example, 30 DAAD scholarship holders came to Mozambique from Germany, while 65 Mozambicans came to Germany with a DAAD scholarship for study purposes in the same period.

== Economic relations ==
Particularly after the significant offshore natural gas discoveries in the northern Rovuma Basin in 2011, economic interest in Mozambique has also grown in Germany. For example, the German Chamber of Commerce Abroad for Southern Africa, based in South Africa, opened a German-Mozambican business development office in Maputo in April 2014.

In 2021, Germany exported 52 million euros worth of goods to Mozambique and in return imported 162 million euros worth of goods from the country. However, goods and services are also traded with Mozambique through German branches in South Africa, which are therefore not included in the German-Mozambican trade statistics.

== Resident diplomatic missions ==
- Germany has an embassy in Maputo.
- Mozambique has an embassy in Berlin.
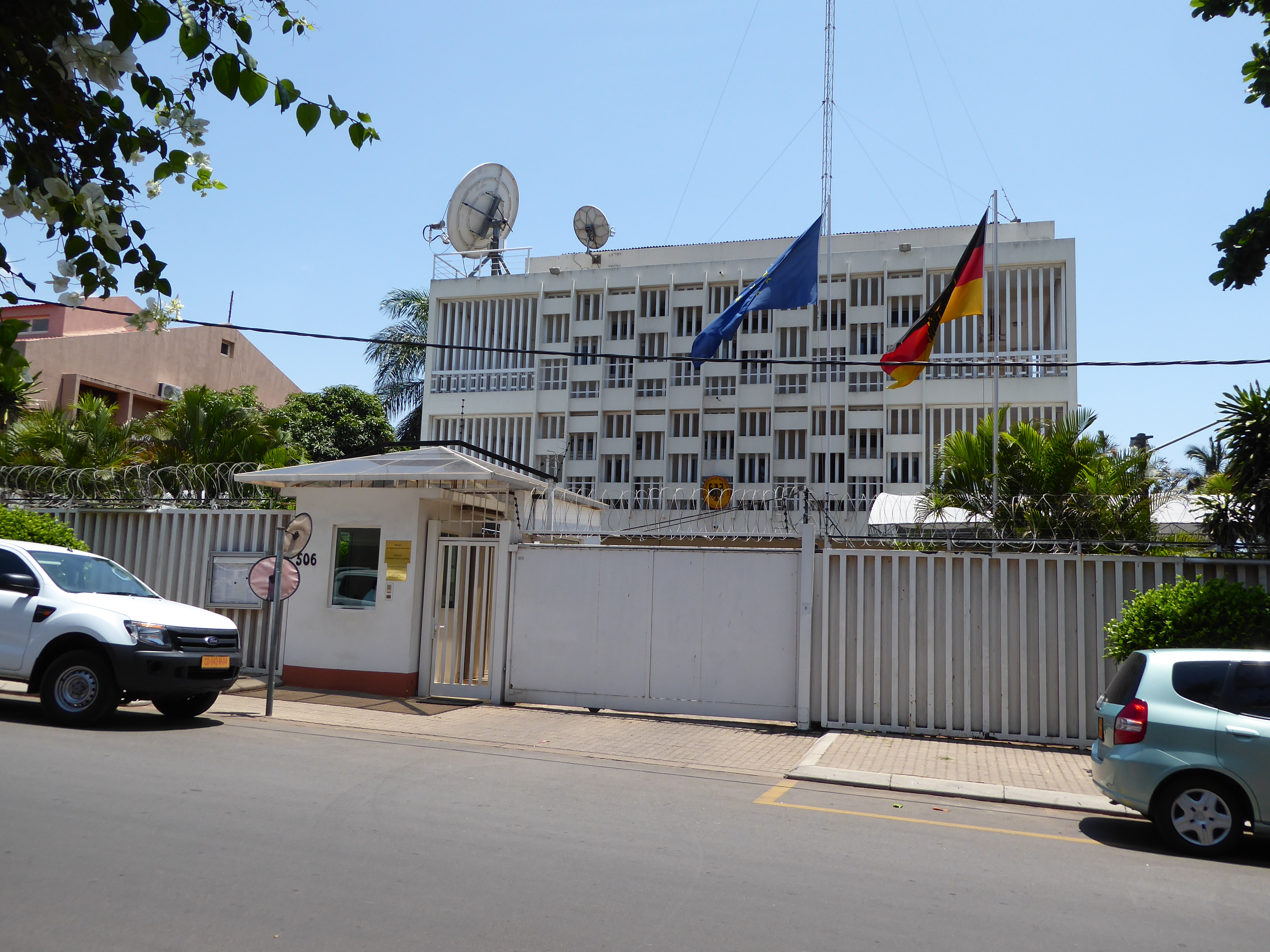
Embassy of Germany in Maputo

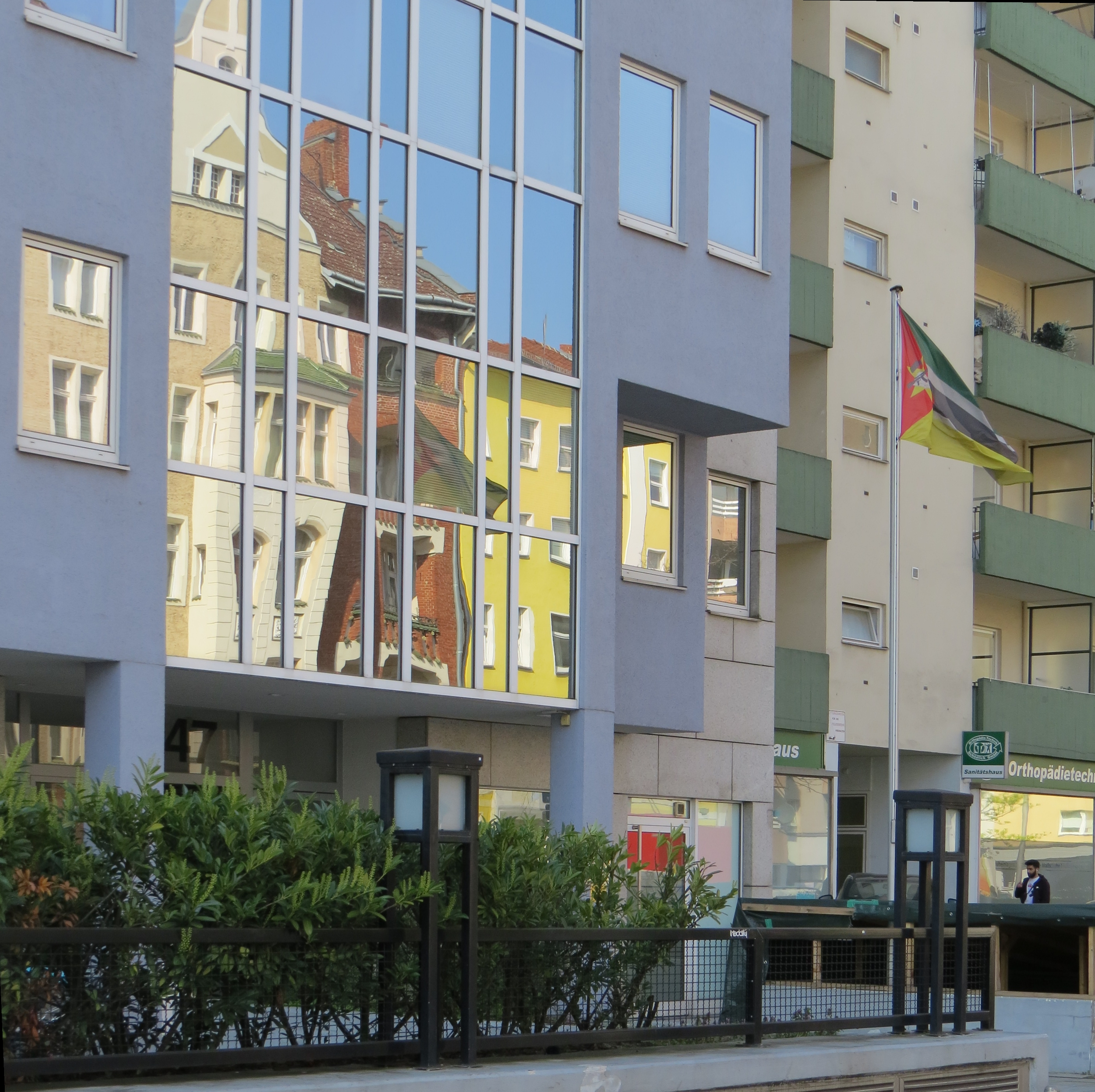
Embassy of Mozambique in Berlin

== Notes ==
- The Embassy of Mozambique in Berlin is accredited to Austria, the Czech Republic, Hungary and Poland.

== Literature ==
- Harald Heinke: Khanimambo Moçambique – Ein Zeitzeuge erzählt. Projekte Verlag Cornelius, Halle/Saale 2010, ISBN 978-3-86237-226-3
- Stefan Bollinger, Ulrich van der Heyden, Ralf Straßburg: Solidarität oder Eigennutz? Die mosambikanischen Vertragsarbeiter in der DDR-Wirtschaft, Helle Panke, Berlin 2015
- Rantzsch, Franziska; The Negotiations of the Contract Labor Accord between the GDR and Mozambique; Kap. 5 in: Navigating Socialist Encounters: Moorings and (Dis)Entanglements between Africa and East Germany during the Cold War; Berlin 2021; ISBN 978-3-11-062231-7
