= Mozambique–Tanzania relations =

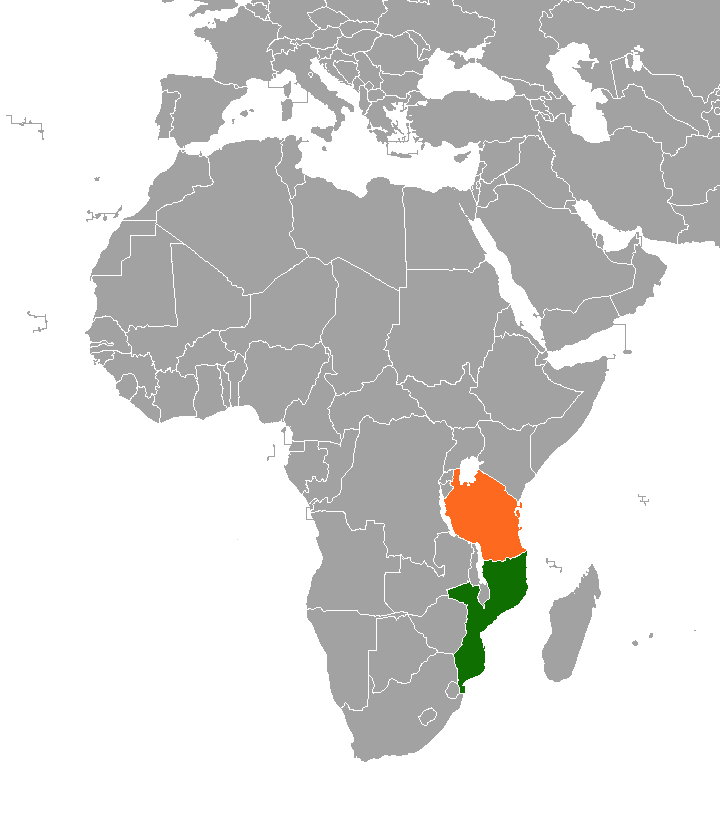
- Mozambique: Tanzania

Mozambique–Tanzania relations are the bilateral relations between Mozambique and Tanzania. Both countries are members of the African Union, Southern African Development Community and Commonwealth of Nations.

== History ==
Mozambique and Tanzania have had cordial relations since Mozambique got its independence from Portugal. After independence, civil war broke out between the ruling party, Front for Liberation of Mozambique(FRELIMO) and Mozambique Resistance Movement (RENAMO), who were backed by Rhodesia and South Africa. FRELIMO was formed in Tanzania with the help of the Tanzanian president Julius Nyerere to help the group fight the Portuguese government and was given land during the civil war to form military camps. After the end of the war, Tanzania continued to maintain good relationships with the country.

== Economic relations ==
With the recent development in gas exploration in the region, Mozambique has boosted its exports to Tanzania in the recent years and Mozambique's major exports to the country mainly include surveying equipment and machinery. Most of the trade between the country is currently conducted between Mtwara Port. The trade between both countries is well balanced and is set to grow in the future. In 2013, Mozambique exported $75.4 million worth of goods to Tanzania and imported $63 million worth of goods. Major Tanzanian exports to Mozambique include textiles, tobacco products and low cost manufactured products.

=== Infrastructure ===
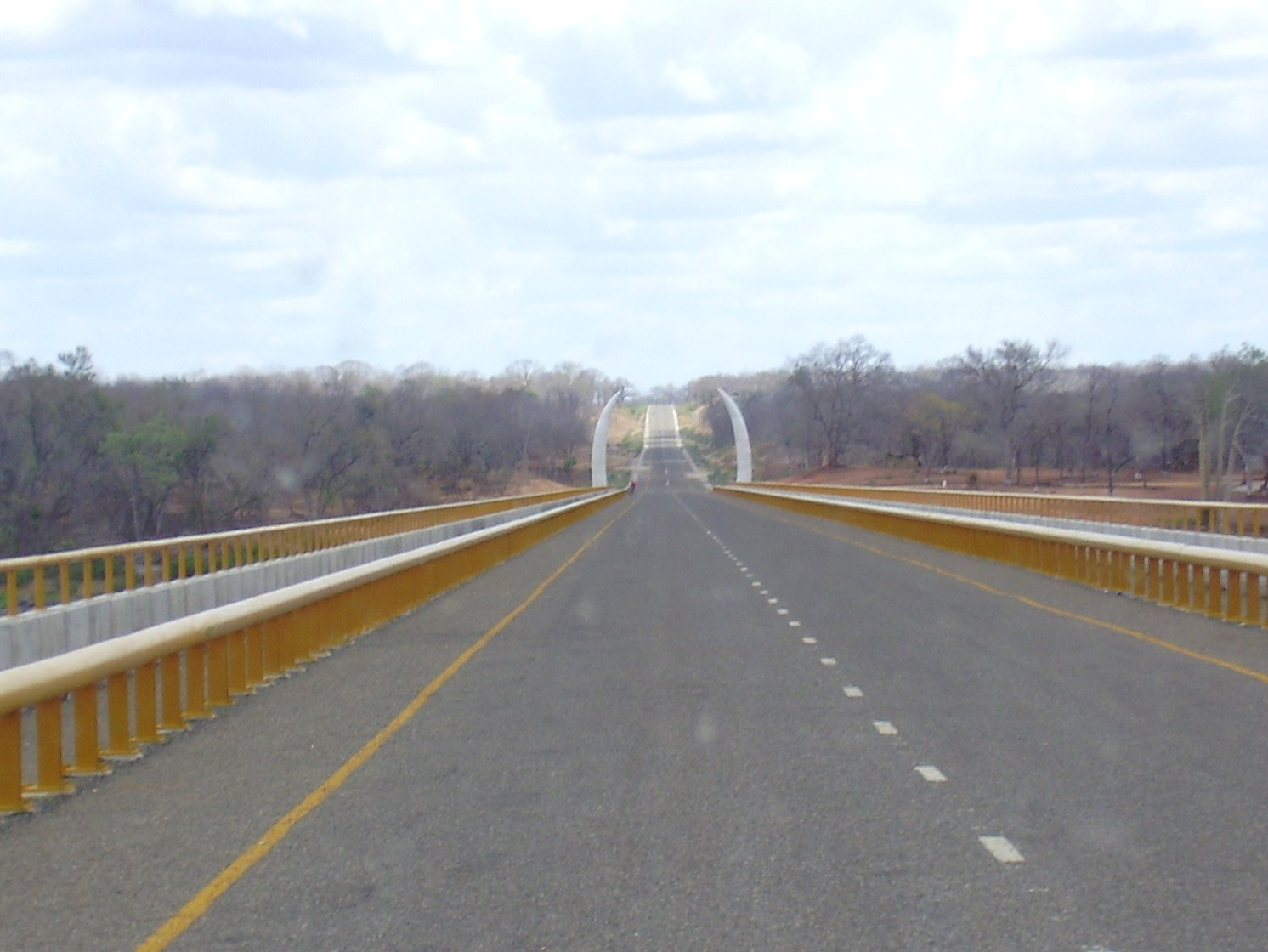
Unity Bridge connecting Mozambique and Tanzania

==== Unity Bridge ====
Mozambique and Tanzania share over an 800 km border however, no roads crossed the Ruvuma River into Mozambique. The Government of Tanzania did begin operating a ferry at Namoto, however in 2005 both countries agreed to build a bridge to facilitate cross border trade. The bridge was inaugurated in 2010. However, due to poor road infrastructure on the Mozambique side, cross border trade has been slow.

==== Mtwara Development Corridor ====
With the increase of economic operations in the south of Tanzania, the Mtwara Development Corridor project would help develop the border region of Tanzania and Mozambique and consequently increase commerce between the two nations.

=== Natural gas ===
Both Tanzania and Mozambique have found large reserves of Gas around the border regions and has created a race for the exploration of the mineral. Both countries are trying to secure contracts to become the largest LNG supplier in Africa. Though there is a race, both countries are still sharing skills to produce better legislation.

== Diplomatic missions ==
Mozambique maintains a high commission in Dar es Salaam. Tanzania maintains a high commission in Maputo

== State visits ==
- 18 May 2015 - President of Mozambique Filipe Nyusi made a three-day state visit to Tanzania to address Mozambican population in the country and improve bilateral relations.
- 21 September 2022 - President of Tanzania Samia Suluhu Hassan made a three-day state visit to Mozambique.
