= Timeline of the Mozambican Civil War =

The following is a timeline of events during the Mozambican Civil War as well as subsequent RENAMO insurgency (2013–2021).

== 1976 ==
=== October ===
- André Matsangaissa, ex-FRELIMO fighters crossed his way into Rhodesia with intention to create armed group.
- Late 1976: First RENAMO base was established in Udzi town in Rhodesia near border with Mozambique.

== 1978 ==
=== October ===
- 15 October: RENAMO seized Macossa town near the boundary between Manica and Sofala Provinces.

== 1979 ==
=== July ===
- 15 July: RENAMO overran the town of Machaze.

=== August ===
- 21–2 August: 300 RENAMO fighters led by André left Gadzi to establish permanent base in Mozambique.

=== September ===
- 5 September: RENAMO established their base in Gorongossa region.

=== October ===
- 5 October: 300 RENAMO fighters left Odzi to establish new base in Manica province. Once they arrived they divided into three groups. One, led by João Fombe, set up a base in the Mabate region, south of the Mussapa river. Second led by Vareia Manje, was deployed in Mucuti, north of Musspara river. Third group led by Magurende John established their base in Chinete.
- 17 October: André Matsangaissa was killed during failed attack on Gorongossa town.

=== November ===
- 5 November: 300 RENAMO fighters led by Lucas Muhlanga left Gadzi to establish their base at the top of Sitatonga mountain. From there 200 rebel continued with 100 fighters arriving at Chidoco and another 100 establishing their base in Muxungue.

== 1980 ==
=== January ===
- 30 January: Government forces destroyed RENAMO headquarters at Gorongosa mountain during the Gorongosa Offensive.

=== April ===
- RENAMO forces moved its headquarters to the Sitatonga mountain in the south.

=== June ===
- 25 June: Armed forces launched Operation Leopard from multiple directions to expel rebels from Sitatonga. By late June they reached the foot of the mountain.

=== July ===
- 9 July: Armed forces destroyed rebel headquarters at Sitatonga mountain. Rebels moved to Chicarre.

== 1981 ==
=== July ===
- 4 July: 300 RENAMO fighters led by Vareia Manje left Chicarre base to open new front in Inhambane province. He established new base in Chichôlane swamps.

=== September ===
- 4 September: Government forces recaptured Machaze.

=== October ===
- 29 October: Railway and road bridges over the Pungwe River were blown up by RENAMO fighters.
- RENAMO fighters led by Calisto Meque and Magurende John left Chicarre towards Jambe. From there they split up with one group of fighters going to Gorongossa and other led by Meque going further north.

=== November ===
- 15 November: RENAMO fighters led by Mário Franque left Chicarre to link up with forces in Chichôlane area. It eventually established their camp in Banhine National Park in Gaza province.

=== December ===
- 4 December: Government forces launched offensvive on RENAMO base in Chicarre known as Operation Punishment (1981).
- 8 December: Government forces took control of Chicarre killing six rebels.
- 10 December: RENAMO fighters who left Jambe crossed the Beirra corridor on their way to Gorongossa.
- 12 December: RENAMO fighters led by Meque attacked the town of Mungári.
- 300 RENAMO fighters led by Dhlakama arrived in Gorongossa region. They established their new headquarters in Casa Banana.

== 1982 ==
=== August ===
- RENAMO fighters led by Meque entered the Tete province after crossing Zambezi river west of Tambara.
- 11 August: 485 RENAMO fighters led by Abel Tsequete left Sadjunjira for Vila Fontes. After crossing the river they entered Zambezi province. RENAMO's central base in Zambezia was established in Mount Nampuli, former PRM base.
- 16 August: RENAMO captured Megaza, Pinda, Derre, Muandiua, Mepinha, Guerissa and Chire villages in Morrumbala district effectively isolating district capital. Government forces eventually recaptured Derre in late 1982 and Chire, Megaza and Pinda in 1983.
- Government forces launched Operation Cabana against rebels. 10,000 men supported by armored vehicles and heavy artillery attacked rebel positions in Gaza province.
- RENAMO seized Macossa.

=== September ===
- In southern Manica province government launched their phase of Operation Cabana pushing south towards Save river.
- Around 100 fighters were parachuted from South Africa to Toma base in Inhambane.

=== December ===
- Zimbabwean forces launched Operation Lifeline with 1,500–2,000 soldiers deploying along the Beira corridor.

== 1983 ==
=== April ===
- 346 RENAMO fighters led by Ossufo Momade entered Nampula province. They established a base near Metaveia on the north bank of the Ligonha River.

=== May ===
- Renamo claimed to have overrun army barracks at Chigubo.

=== September ===
- RENAMO again took control of Marínguè.
- 150 RENAMO fighters led by Rocha Paulino moved into Niassa province. They established their base near Muacanha.

== 1984 ==
=== January ===
- Late January: 60 RENAMO fighters led by Pedro Muchanga crossed the Incomáti River setting up bases near the Maputo.

=== May ===
- RENAMO fighters led by Rocha Paulino entered the Cabo Delgado province and established their base in Muikho area. In 1985 they moved to Namecala town.

=== August ===
- Government forces overran RENAMO base at Tome.

=== December ===
- RENAMO established bases in Ponta d’Ouro, Bela Vista and Salamanga near the capital.

== 1985 ==
=== August ===
- 6 August: RENAMO took control of Mopeia.
- 20 August: RENAMO took control of Morrumbala.
- 20–4: Armed forces destroyed RENAMO base at Muxamba.
- 23 August: Government forces captured RENAMO base in Maringué.
- 28 August: Government forces captured RENAMO headquarters at Casa Banana in Gorongossa. They also attacked nearby RENAMO bases in Fábrica, Cavalo and Bunga.

=== September ===
- Late September: Government forces captured large RENAMO base in Xichocoxa in southern Inhambane Province.

=== December ===
- RENAMO took control of Sena in northern Sofala, Tica in central Sofala, and Dombe in southern Manica killing 124 soldiers.
- RENAMO captured Chiromo garrison.

== 1986 ==
=== January ===
- 9 January: RENAMO took control of Marromeu.
- 27 January: Government forces recaptured Marromeu.

=== February ===
- 14 February: Around 400 RENAMO fighters overran government positions at Casa Banana.
- RENAMO took control of Namacurra town. They occupied it for three days.

=== March ===
- Guerrillas infiltrated the Matola area on the outskirts of the capital and clashed with government forces and the police.

=== April ===
- 12 April: Government forces recaptured Casa Banana.
- 14–5 April: Government forces recaptured Cavalo.

=== July ===
Map of the 1986 RENAMO offensive

- 17–21 July: RENAMO claimed to have captured five town: Gurue, Maganja da Costa and Lion in Zambezia and Malea and Mutuali in Nampula province.
- 23 July: Government forces claimed to clear Machanga district from rebels.

=== September ===
- 15 September: Government forces destroyed rebel base at Chitende in Nampula province.
- 23 September: RENAMO took control of Mutarara district forcing 1,000 soldiers to flee into Malawi.
- 25 September: RENAMO launches big offensive, capturing Caia, Gile, Nametil.
- 26 September: RENAMO took control of Milange.
- 29 September: RENAMO took control of Alto Molocue, Licuari in Zambezia province and Milange.
- RENAMO took control of Inhaminga, Marromeu and Chuabo.

=== October ===
- 6 October: RENAMO took control of Zumbo.
- 16 October: RENAMO took control of Villa Machado village.
- RENAMO took control of Derre in Murrumbala district. They also captured Megaza and Pinda.
- RENAMO occupied Namarroi for three days.

=== November ===
- 8 November: RENAMO took control of Ulongue kidnapping five foreigners.

=== December ===
- 29 December: RENAMO took control of Namarroi.

== 1987 ==
=== January ===
- 4 January: RENAMO claimed to have captured Semacueza town near Beira.
- RENAMO overran army garrison at Meluco in Cabo Delgado.

=== February ===
- 10 February: Government forces recaptured Ceta.
- Government forces recaptured Mutarara bridge, Sena, Mutara, Vila Nova and Bave.

=== March ===
- 7 March: Government forces recaptured Mopeia.
- 9 March: Government forces took control of Luabo in Zambezia province.

=== April ===
- Government forces recaptured Maringue, Muanza, Cheringoma and Marromeu in last few weeks.
- 28 April: Government forces recaptured Morrumbala district.
- 29 April: Government forces took control of Alfazema base in Morrumbaia district.

=== June ===
- RENAMo took control of Nhanala in Gaza.

=== August ===
- RENAMO launched Lightning Offensive attacking government positions to the north and west of the capital. Important rail and road crossroads were raided, with some of them being leveled, including Manjacaza in southern Gaza in early August.
- 10 August: RENAMO kill 92 civilians at Manjacaze in Gaza Province during the Manjacaze Massacre.

=== October ===
- 10 October: Government forces launched a three-week offensive in the south capturing several bases including Morrumane.
- 16 October: RENAMO kill 53 civilians at Taninga in Maputo Province during the First Taninga Massacre.
- 28 October: RENAMO kill 278 civilians at Taninga in Maputo Province during the Second Taninga Massacre.

=== November ===
- 25 November: Government forces destroyed RENAMO base in Matsequentra near the border with South Africa.
- 28 November: RENAMO kill 71 civilians and injure another 78 at Maluana in Maputo Province during the Maluana Massacre.

=== December ===
- 16 December: Government forces recaptured Namarroi.
- 24 December: Government forces recaptured Nhanala in Gaza province.

== 1988 ==
- RENAMO took control of Mugulama.

=== January ===
- RENAMO destroyed the town of Namacata, on the outskirts of Quelimane, the provincial capital, before retreating.

=== February ===
- mid-February: RENAMO raided Bella Vista town on the Maputo River.
- 27–8 February: RENAMO took control of Marrapula.

=== March ===
- Late March: Government forces destroyed tree RENAMO bases at Chiconjo, Maginge and Nhahombe reportedly killing 260 rebels.

=== June ===
- 2 June: Government forces recaptured Milange and Derre, however they withdrew from Derre after a month.
- 1–14 June: Government forces destroyed RENAMO bases in Cachane, Malengane, Macandane, Marracuene, and Matongomane. 24 rebels were captured.

=== July ===
- 10 July: Government recaptured Gile.
- Over the past three months government forces recaptured Fingoe, Tsangano, Zobue, Cazula, Domue and Calomue. They also destroyed rebel bases in Matenje (Macanga district) and Chintola (Zumbo district). They also recaptured Zangue, Chiuta, Singue and Sangano.

=== August ===
- 17 August: RENAMO took control of Lugela.

=== September ===
- 21 September: Armed forces destroyed rebel base in Nhinjele in Inharrime district killing two rebels.

=== October ===
- RENAMO took control of Inhaminga.

=== November ===
- 27 November: RENAMO occupied Gurue.
- 30 November: Government forces recaptured Gurue.

=== December ===
- 2 December: Government forces recaptured Lugela.
- Late 1988: New pro-government armed group, Naparama, emerged Ribáuè district in Nampula province. It was led by Manuel Antionio.

== 1989 ==
=== January ===
- 7 January: RENAMO took control of Alto Molócuè and Machanga.
- RENAMO took control of Makiwa (Mocuba district), and Chire (Morrumbala district).

=== February ===
- 16 February: RENAMO occupied Ile district.
- 23 February: Government forces recaptured Ile.

=== June ===
- 27 June: RENAMO occupied Mopeia district.

=== July ===
- Government forces overran a major insurgent base in the strategic Alto Ligohna area of Gile District freeing around 1,000 civilians.
- 6 July: Government forces recaptured Mopeia.

=== August ===
- 5 August: Government forces destroyed RENAMO bases in Yumbisa, Majune, Mbambe and Chilotoxe in Niassa province killing 75 rebels.
- 15 August: Government forces recaptured Tambara district in Manica province.

=== November ===
- 15 November: RENAMO occupied Mopeia district.
- 20 November: Government forces recaptured Mopeia.

=== December ===
- 16 December: Government forces took control of Mugulama town. It was recaptured by rebels a few weeks later.
- Government forces attacked RENAMO's Machavela base near Homoine in Inhambane province.

== 1990 ==
=== January ===
- 20 January: Government forces again captured Mugulama.

=== March ===
- Naprama movement went on offensive against RENAMO in Alto Molocue district, in Nauela area. The offensive continued until May.

=== April ===
- 22 April: Armed forces recaptured Chigubo, last RENAMO-held district capital.
- Late April: Armed forces destroyed rebel base in Tulo, near lake Niassa and another one in the district of Barue. In Machaze district they overran rebel camp at Muengi freeing several dozen people.

=== May ===
- Early May: Government forces captured Umbuane locality. It was a rebel base for over a year.
- 14 May: Government forces took control of Ngungwe base.
- 15 May: Government forces destroyed rebel base in Chawene on the northern Inhambane coast.

=== June ===
Naparama offensive 1989–1991

- 11 June: Government forces recapaptured Socone administrative post in Zambezia. It was under rebel control for three years.
- Mid-June: Naparama took control of Maciwa base in central Zambezia.

=== July ===
- Naparama militia led by Manuel Antonio took control of Murrua.

=== August ===
- 31 August: Naparama took control of Muasiwa near Mugulama.
- Naparama militia took control of Mulevala.

=== October ===
- Government forces from Nicoadala district recaptured Derre town.

== 1991 ==
=== March ===
- Government forces recaptured Namanjavira in Mocuba dlstrict.
- 28 March: Government forces captured RENAMO base at Gorondene in Inhambane region.
- 30 March: Government forces destroyed rebel base in Senga-Senga in Sofala province.

=== April ===
- 18 April: Government forces captured RENAMO base at Nhamagodoa, in Maringue district, killing 16 rebels.
- RENAMO took control of Mecumburi, Nampuli.

=== May ===
- 13 May: Government forces repelled attack on Morrumbala killing five rebels.
- 21 May: Government forces repelled rebel attack on Cavalo base killing four of them.

=== June ===
- 29 June: RENAMO took control of Lalaua.

=== July ===
- Joint Mozambican-Zimbabwe forces destroyed RENAMO base in Maringue area in Sofala province. In total military claimed to have killed 593 rebels in July.

=== August ===
- Naparama fighters recaptured Mecumburi.
- 5 August: Armed forces recaptured Lalaua.

=== September ===
- 19 September: RENAMO again captured Lalaua.

=== December ===
- 5 December: Manuel António, leader of Naprama, was killed in battle with RENAMO.
- 23 December: RENAMO took control of Namarroi village.

== 1992 ==
=== January ===
- 16 January: Armed forces took control of RENAMO base in Ngungwe near border with South Africa. Rebels allegedly used chemical weapons against soldiers.
- 23 January: RENAMO took control of Imala.

=== April ===
- RENAMO rebels attacked suburbs in Beira, Xai-Xai, Nampula and Maputo cities.
- 24 April: Government forces recaptured Imala.

=== June ===
- 7 June: Rebels from Nalazi and Dindiza bases attacked Chibuto town. Attack was repelled.
- Late June: Government banned Naparama.

=== October ===
- 17 October: RENAMO took control of Maganja da Costa.
- 18 October: RENAMO took control of Angoche, killing 40 government soldiers.
- 19 October: RENAMO took control of Memba in Nampula province.
- 21 October: RENAMO took control of Lugela.
- 22 October: government forces recaptured Angoche.
- 27 October: Government forces recaptured Memba.

=== November ===
- 24 November: Government forces recaptured Lugela.

== 1994 ==
=== April ===
- 15 April: 38 RENAMO fighters were demobilised in Neves.

== 2016 ==
=== September ===
- 12 September: Government forces dismantled RENAMO base in Sabe in Marrupala district.

=== October ===
- 14 October: Government forces dismantled RENAMO base in the village of Napuco, Murrupula district.

== 2019 ==
=== August ===
- 1 August: President Filipe Nyusi and RENAMO leader Ossufo Momade signed a peace agreement at RENAMO's remote military base in the Gorongosa mountains which brought an end to hostilities.

=== September ===
- 6 September: Government forces attacked RENAMO Military Junta base in Chipindaumwe, Gondola district.

== 2020 ==
=== June ===
- 13 June: 60 RENAMO fighters from Donda district laid down their weapons in Savana.

=== July ===
- 15 July: RENAMO base at Muxungue, in the central Mozambican province of Sofala was closed with 251 fighters disarmed.

=== August ===
- 20 August: Disarmenment process started at Mount Gorongossa covering RENAMO leadership.

=== September ===
- 5 September: 140 fighters were disarmed at Mangueiras base, near Gorongossa.

=== October ===
- 14 October: RENAMO base in Cheringoma district was closed with 173 fighters laying down their weapons.
- 25 October: During last two weeks RENAMO bases in Inhaminga, Chemba, and Maringue were closed with 336 fighters laying down their weapons.

=== November ===
- 30 November: Last RENAMO base in Inhambane province at Ribye, on the boundary between Funhalouro and Mabote districts was dismantled with 170 fighters laying down their weapons.

== 2021 ==
=== March ===
- 30 March: RENAMO demobilisation was completed in Manica province with 817 fighters laying down their weapons. Bases in Tambara, Barue and Mossurize districts were closed.

=== June ===
- 30 June: RENAMO base at Monjo, Moatize district was dismantled and fighters laid down their weapons.

=== July ===
- 11 July: RENAMO base in Zobué, Tete province as closed with 360 fighters joining disarmament.

=== October ===
- 11 October: RMJ leader was shot dead in a firefight with Mozambican security forces in Cheringoma District. According to Bernadino Rafael, General Commander of the Mozambican police force, Nhongo's force had attacked a patrol in the bush at Njovo. He died alongside one of his main lieutenants, Wulawucama.

=== December ===
- 1 December: Last remnant group of the RMJ -counting 24 militants- had joined the "Demobilisation, Disarmament and Reintegration" (DDR) programme. The group had laid down its weapons at Murrupula, Nampula Province.
- 11 December: RENAMO base in Murrupla district was closed with 560 fighters demobilised.
