= Gorongosa Offensive =

Military operation by Mozambique

- Part of the Mozambican Civil War
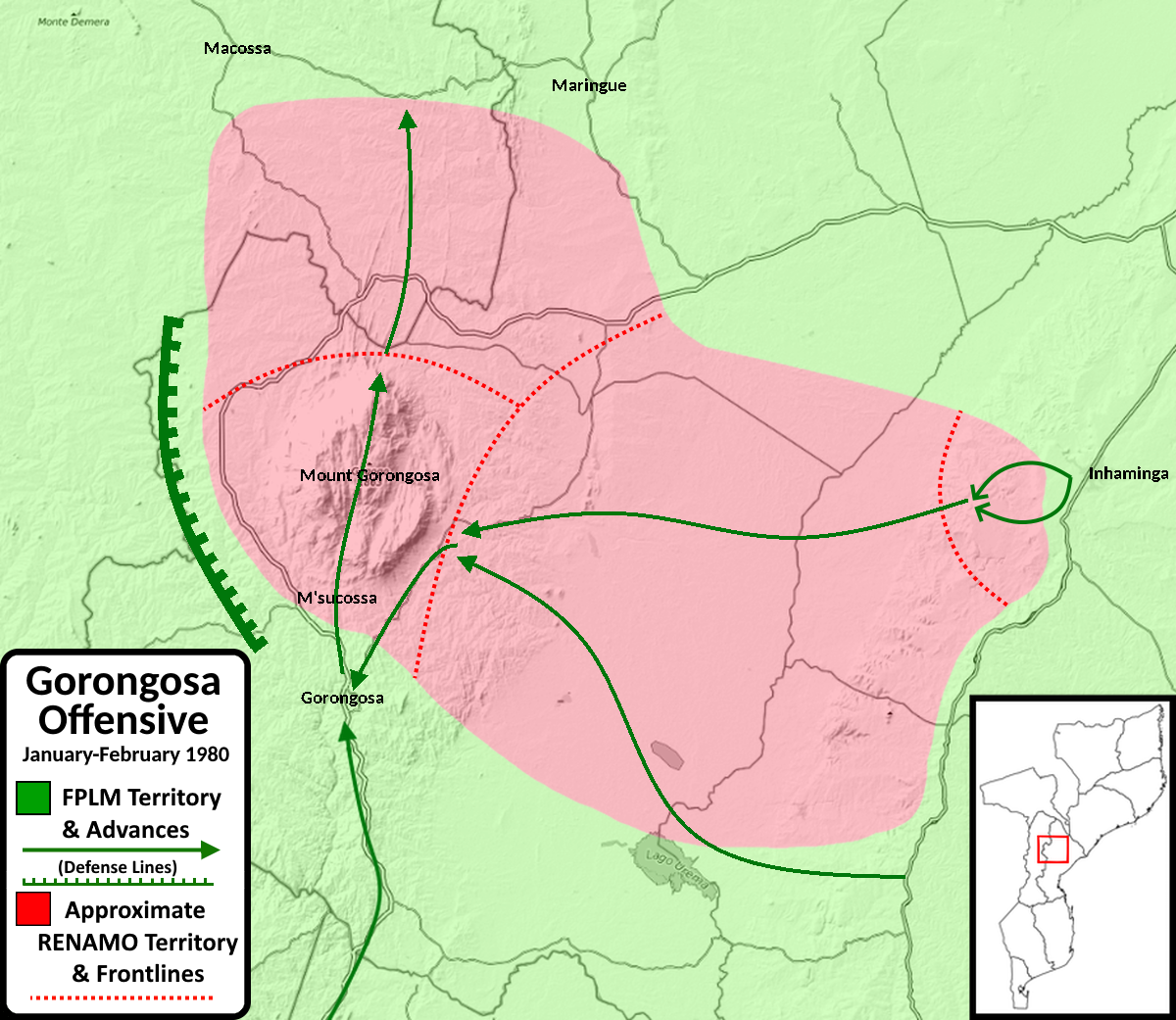
Date	January – February 1980
Location	Mount Gorongosa, Gorongosa National Park, Mozambique
Result	FRELIMO victory: Capture of RENAMO's Gorongosa base and surrounding areas; RENAMO temporarily ceases activity north of the Beira-Umtali corridor

Belligerents
People's Republic of Mozambique; Supported by: Cuba; Soviet Union	RENAMO; Supported by: South Africa

Commanders and leaders
Samora Machel	Afonso Dhlakama

Units involved
Mozambican Armed Forces: 2nd, 3rd, 4th, 5th, 7th and 8th Brigade	Unknown

Strength
7,500	500–600

Casualties and losses
Unknown	Per FRELIMO: "Heavy casualties"

The Gorongosa Offensive was a military operation by the People's Republic of Mozambique beginning in January 1980 aimed at destroying the RENAMO bases around the Gorongosa area which were increasingly threatening roads, towns, communication lines, FPLM troops and more. The Gorongosa Offensive was the first major military offensive launched by the FPLM during the war.

== Prelude ==
Beginning in August 1979 RENAMO began their activity in Gorongosa traveling from their base in Odzi, Rhodesia. They set up a base on the main Gorongosa Mountain and established several other smaller positions near the mountain. In September 1979 RENAMO expanded even further from their main base in Gorongosa capturing Macossa to the north and M’sucossa to the south as well as running reconnaissance missions in the Gorongosa plateau. During October FPLM recaptured Macossa and in mid-October RENAMO launched an attack on Morombodze and from there launched an attack on the town of Gorongosa south of the mountain. The attack led to the defeat of RENAMO with their leader André Matsangaissa being killed during the battle. RENAMO withdrew to their positions prior to the attack. In November RENAMO expanded eastward to Inhaminga laying siege to the town for over a week and also briefly occupied the towns of Maringué and Mazamba. In December FPLM deployed troops near Mount Gorongosa to the west which RENAMO overran on 30 December.

== Offensive ==
The offensive was planned by the Soviets who had advisors present in Beira during the operation. Additionally, prior to the attack Frelimo offered amnesty to any RENAMO rebel who surrendered with their weapons. The offensive began in January with the destruction of the RENAMO base near Inhaminga which was captured through an artillery shelling followed by a two-pronged assault that quickly captured the camp. The next day Frelimo forces began advancing from the Dondo-Inhaminga road westwards towards the main base on Gorongosa Mountain however their forces became bogged down in wet and muddy terrain traveling through the Gorongosa National Park which took the soldiers two days to reach their next positions near the east side of the mountain. South of the town of Gorongosa another brigade was moving northwards on the Inchope road toward the town where eventually all the forces would meet to launch an assault on the main base on the Gorongosa Mountain. RENAMO instead of facing the large number of Frelimo forces decided to retreat from their bases on the Gorongosa Mountain and surrounding areas and the offensive came to a close in February with Frelimo drawing down their presence in the region on 5 March.

== Aftermath ==
Following the offensive RENAMO chose to abandon all of their operations north of the Beira-Umtali corridor and withdraw to their Sitatonga 2 base in southern Manica Province which the FPLM would capture a couple of months later during Operation Leopard. However this plan was temporary with RENAMO stashing weapons caches in the Gorongosa area in preparation for their return.

== Bibliography ==
- Emerson, Stephen A. (2014). The Battle for Mozambique: The Frelimo–Renamo Struggle, 1977–1992. Solihull, Pinetown: Helion & Company, 30° South Publishers. ISBN 978-1-909384-92-7.
- Cabrita, João M. (2000). Mozambique: The Tortuous Road to Democracy. London: Palgrave Macmillan. ISBN 978-1-349-42432-0.
- Robinson, David A. (2006). Curse on the Land: A History of the Mozambican Civil War (PDF). Perth.
