= Manjacaze massacre =

1987 massacre in Mozambique

- Part of the Mozambican Civil War
- Manjacaze (Mozambique)
- Location: Manjacaze, Gaza Province, Mozambique
- Date: 10 August 1987
- Attack type: Mass murder, Looting, Kidnapping
- Deaths: 92 killed
- Perpetrator: RENAMO

The Manjacaze massacre was a massacre of civilians in the town of Manjacaze, Gaza Province, Mozambique on the 10th of August, 1987. The massacre was carried out by a large number of RENAMO rebels against the lightly defended town with the final death toll being 92 civilians. Kidnappings, looting and destruction of infrastructure and property were widely reported. The massacre at Manjacaze occurred less than a month after the nearby Homoine Massacre and was a part of RENAMO’s campaign to cut the capital Maputo off from the rest of the country, however RENAMO denied responsibility for these attacks.

== Massacre ==
According to government reports, the massacre began when approximately 600 rebels entered the town of Manjacaze at around 6:00 am. The rebels were armed with mortars, bazookas, guns and bladed weapons and began killing civilians as well as destroying the town’s electrical power station, water and fuel pumps, restaurants, warehouses, residences and attacking the town’s banks and government buildings as well as the town’s cashew plant. One witness reported that his wife was murdered with a bayonet. The rebels reportedly booby trapped areas near commercial, residential and public areas with the use of land mines and pen bombs. Nine FPLM soldiers were stationed in the town of Manjacaze at the time of the massacre and were reportedly able to put up a resistance killing 10 rebels before government reinforcements from nearby towns arrived. The main attack ended at around 3:00 pm on the same day when the militants were pushed out of the town however the rebels kidnapped many civilians, several of whom were later killed. During pursuit operations, government forces engaged in several clashes that left 15 rebels dead, among them was one of the group’s leaders.

== Aftermath ==
Following the massacre thousands of residents fled Manjacaze for the regional capital Xai-Xai. Several civilians who remained in Manjacaze lost their legs after walking over land mines placed by the rebels days after the initial attack. Many journalists, diplomats and government officials visited the town including the head of affairs at the US Embassy in Mozambique Michael Ranneberger who condemned the attack as well as advisors to the 1988 Republican presidential candidates. The International Red Cross condemned the attack.

== See also ==
- Maluana Massacre
- Second Taninga Massacre

== Bibliography ==
- Robinson, David A. (2006). Curse on the Land: A History of the Mozambican Civil War (PDF). Perth.
