= List of heads of the National Resistance Government of Mozambique =

The National Resistance Government of Mozambique was in place from the start of the civil war against the central government of Mozambique in 1977 until an accord was reached with the government on 9 October 1992.

== Affiliations ==
The incumbents held affiliations with the conservative political group in Mozambique. This group, the Mozambican National Resistance, was named Resistencia Nacional Moçambicana (MNR). After May 1977, this changed to Resistencia Nacional Moçambicana (RENAMO).

== Timeline ==
The following shows each incumbent of the National Resistance Government of Mozambique, the term year, their political affiliation, and additional notes. Dates given in italics indicate de facto continuation of office.

Term	Incumbent	Affiliation	Notes
1977 to 1978	André Matsangaissa, Chairman	MNR
1978 to 1987	Afonso Dhlakama, Chairman	RENAMO	1981: occupation of majority of the interior of Mozambique
1987 to 9 October 1992	Afonso Dhlakama, President of National Council	RENAMO	7 August 1992: Truce signed with the government of Mozambique
9 October 1992	Accord with the government; end of civil war
