= Operation Leopard (1980) =

Mozambican Military Operation

- Part of the Mozambican Civil War
- Operation Leopard (1980) (Mozambique)
Date	April – July 1980
Location	Southern Manica Province, Mozambique
Result	FRELIMO victory: Capture of RENAMO's Sitatonga 2 base

Belligerents
People's Republic of Mozambique; Zimbabwe; Cuba; Supported by: Soviet Union	RENAMO; Supported by: South Africa

Commanders and leaders
Samora Machel; Robert Mugabe	Afonso Dhlakama; Mário Franque; Languane Vareia Manje

Units involved
Mozambican Armed Forces: 2nd, 3rd, 4th, 5th and 8th Brigade; Mozambique Air Force; Zimbabwe Defence Force	Unknown

Strength
Unknown	800–1,200 men

Casualties and losses
Per RENAMO: 168 killed 8 Cubans killed and 24 wounded	Per FRELIMO: 272 killed 300 captured Per RENAMO: 4 killed

In the Mozambican Civil War, Operation Leopard (Portuguese: Operação Leopardo) was a military operation by the FPLM in southern Manica Province which culminated in the capture of RENAMO’s stronghold in the Sitatonga 2 Mountain. Following the offensive FPLM was unable to maintain their full control over the area captured and RENAMO continued to remain active around Sitatonga 2.

== Prelude ==
In November 1979, RENAMO's senior instructor Major Dudley Coventry ordered RENAMO to establish several new bases including one at Sitatonga 2. A 300-strong battalion under the command of Lucas Muhlanga left the main Renamo base in Odzi, Zimbabwe-Rhodesia, to begin building the base. The main base was established at the top of the Sitatonga 2 mountain with a helicopter landing strip being built for South African supplies to be delivered. The area was chosen because of its isolation from the rest of the country due to the compact bush and lack of infrastructure allowing observation posts to be built within a 20km area of the main base.

Following RENAMO’s defeat in the Gorongosa area after FRELIMO’s first major offensive in the war, Dhlakama ordered a withdrawal of troops north of the Beira-Umtali corridor in April with Dhlakama and around several hundred men traveling to the Sitatonga 2 base in May. RENAMO’s area of operations were now confined to southern Sofala and Manica provinces. With a successful offensive under FRELIMO’s belt the planning began for a second offensive to eliminate the remaining rebels.

== Battle ==
=== Planning ===
The planning for Operation Leopard was aided by Zimbabwean, Cuban and Soviet forces with the main forward headquarters for the operation being located at Chibabava. The Soviets provided military advisers in Beira during the operation while the Cubans provided both military advisers and combat support. Zimbabwe, which had recently seen the Mugabe Government take power was a key ally to Mozambique and played a critical role in the planning and execution of the offensive. Mozambican officials met with Zimbabwean officials including CIO Director Kenneth Flower who provided intelligence regarding the location and strength of the RENAMO base. Zimbabwe also promised to secure its border surrounding the Sitatonga base to prevent RENAMO rebels escaping into Zimbabwe.

The operational area spanned from the Save River to the south, the Beira corridor to the north, the Zimbabwean border to the west and Chibabava to the east. Two battalions of the 8th brigade were deployed along the south bank of the Save River while units from the 4th and 5th Brigades were deployed along the north bank of the river to prevent fleeing RENAMO rebels from entering southern Mozambique. Additionally, units of the 2nd Brigade were deployed on the north bank of the Save River where they would advance northwards towards the Buzi River. Units from the 3rd and 4th Brigades would advance from Dombe where they would advance westward along the Buzi River. The 5th Brigade was also present at the Chibabava headquarters. Along Zimbabwe’s side of the operation Zimbabwean troops would be deployed along the Zimbabwe-Mozambique Border and Mozambican units would be allowed to access Zimbabwean territory to attack RENAMO’s Sitatonga base from Espungabera and Goy-Goy.

=== Execution ===
FPLM launched the offensive with their forces quickly closing in on RENAMO positions. RENAMO forces couldn't directly face the oncoming offensive and opted to retreat towards the main base while ambushing the road bound troops. However, it didn't take long for the FPLM to close in on RENAMO who were positioned on top of the Sitatonga 2 Mountain. On the 25 June FPLM attacked RENAMO’s northern position however the terrain hindered the assault. They then moved towards attacking RENAMO’s southern flank aided by MiG-17 fighter-bombers and artillery. On the 30 June FPLM unleashed a final assault beginning with the heavy use of artillery and air bombardment. The assault was launched from the north bank of the Buzi River at Chibabava with forces also mounting ambushes on both banks of the Buzi River in anticipation of fleeing guerrillas. Due to the steep slopes of the Sitatonga 2 mountain the FPLM had to transport troops up the mountain via helicopter. RENAMO desperately attempted to halt the advance firing their only B-10 recoilless rifle from the top of the mountain. Fighting occurred until late at night before the guerrillas eventually evacuated the base at 10pm.

Fleeing RENAMO forces travelled north towards the Lucite River where forces under the command of Languane Vareia Manje were sent to assist them. To aid the escaping guerrillas RENAMO reinforcements at Chidoco under the command of Mario Franque were sent to ambush FPLM troops around Sitatonga with skirmishes occurring several days after the fall of the base. RENAMO claimed that most of the FPLM’s casualties occurred during these ambushes by Vareia and Franque forces. South African helicopters were also spotted evacuating some RENAMO survivors.

== Aftermath ==
The operation was a success for the Mozambican Government further putting RENAMO on the back foot. The rebels also lost a significant amount of weapons and ammunition, much of which was supplied by South Africa. However, it failed to fully rid Mozambique of RENAMO influence with guerrillas merely fleeing to other areas. Guerrillas who escaped to the Lucite River to meet up with forces under the command of Languane Vareia regrouped in Mabate while the rest of the troops under Dhlakama’s command set up the new headquarters near the Zimbabwe border in Chicarre, which would fall the following year in an FPLM offensive named Operation Punishment (1981). Additionally, RENAMO activity would continue to be reported around Sitatonga following the operation highlighting the FPLM’s failure to fully control the area.

== Bibliography ==
- Emerson, Stephen A. (2014). The Battle for Mozambique: The Frelimo–Renamo Struggle, 1977–1992. Solihull, Pinetown: Helion & Company, 30° South Publishers. ISBN 978-1-909384-92-7.
- Cabrita, João M. (2000). Mozambique: The Tortuous Road to Democracy. London: Palgrave Macmillan. ISBN 978-1-349-42432-0.
- Robinson, David A. (2006). Curse on the Land: A History of the Mozambican Civil War (PDF). Perth.
