= Manuel António (warlord) =

- Born: 1962; Northern Mozambique
- Died: 5 December 1991 Macuse, Mozambique
- Allegiance: Naparama
- Service years: 1988 – 1991
- Conflicts: Mozambican Civil War

Manuel António (1962 – 5 December 1991) was a Mozambican militant who served as one of the main leaders of the Naparama militia during the Mozambican Civil War from 1989 to 1991.

== Early life ==
According to some sources, António was born into the Makonde tribe in Cabo Delgado Province, while according to others he was from the Ndau tribe in Zambezia Province.

According to a story António told to foreign journalists, he had "died" from measles at young age, was buried and resurrected after seven days. He then claimed to have spent six months on Mount Namuli where he received divine mission from Jesus Christ and learned how to turn bullets into water. According to an account by a former Naparama combatant, António had learned magic in his home province of Cabo Delgado. According to one source, he possibly might have learned it from elder healer named Zinco.

== War ==
In late 1988, António established a militia in the Ribáuè District of Nampula Province to fight local RENAMO insurgents. He recruited fighters by promising them a magical protection which would make them themselves immune to bullets. The "vaccination" (Naparama) ritual he invented reportedly involved cutting necks and chests of teenage fighters with razor blades before rubbing ashes from an unidentified plant into the wounds. Afterward, the recruits were struck with a machete blade to test their invulnerability. The fighters were also told to follow a strict code of behaviour, including a prohibition on marriage, sex and drinking.

In 1989, António moved into the Zambezia Province where he led his forces in capturing several RENAMO bases. In March 1990, he entered the town of Alto Molocue. There he conducted multiple ceremonies, recruiting more than 400 people into his group, before departing in late June. In July, his forces took control of the Morrua District.

According to a report published in the Mozambique News Agency on 5 December 1991, António was killed while defending the headquarters of a coconut plantation in the coastal town of Macuse against a RENAMO attack. Nine other militia members and 25 RENAMO fighters were killed during this clash. His body, riddled with bullet holes and bayonet wounds, was taken to Quelimane and buried on 7 December. According to some claims his death was a result of betrayal by his mistress, his assistant, or a former Naparama member who had joined RENAMO; it was claimed that the betrayal had resulted in him losing his protective powers.

== Personal life ==
António had a girlfriend, around 19 years old, whom he picked up in Quelimane.
