= André Thomashausen =

German academic and Legal scholar

Professor André Thomashausen
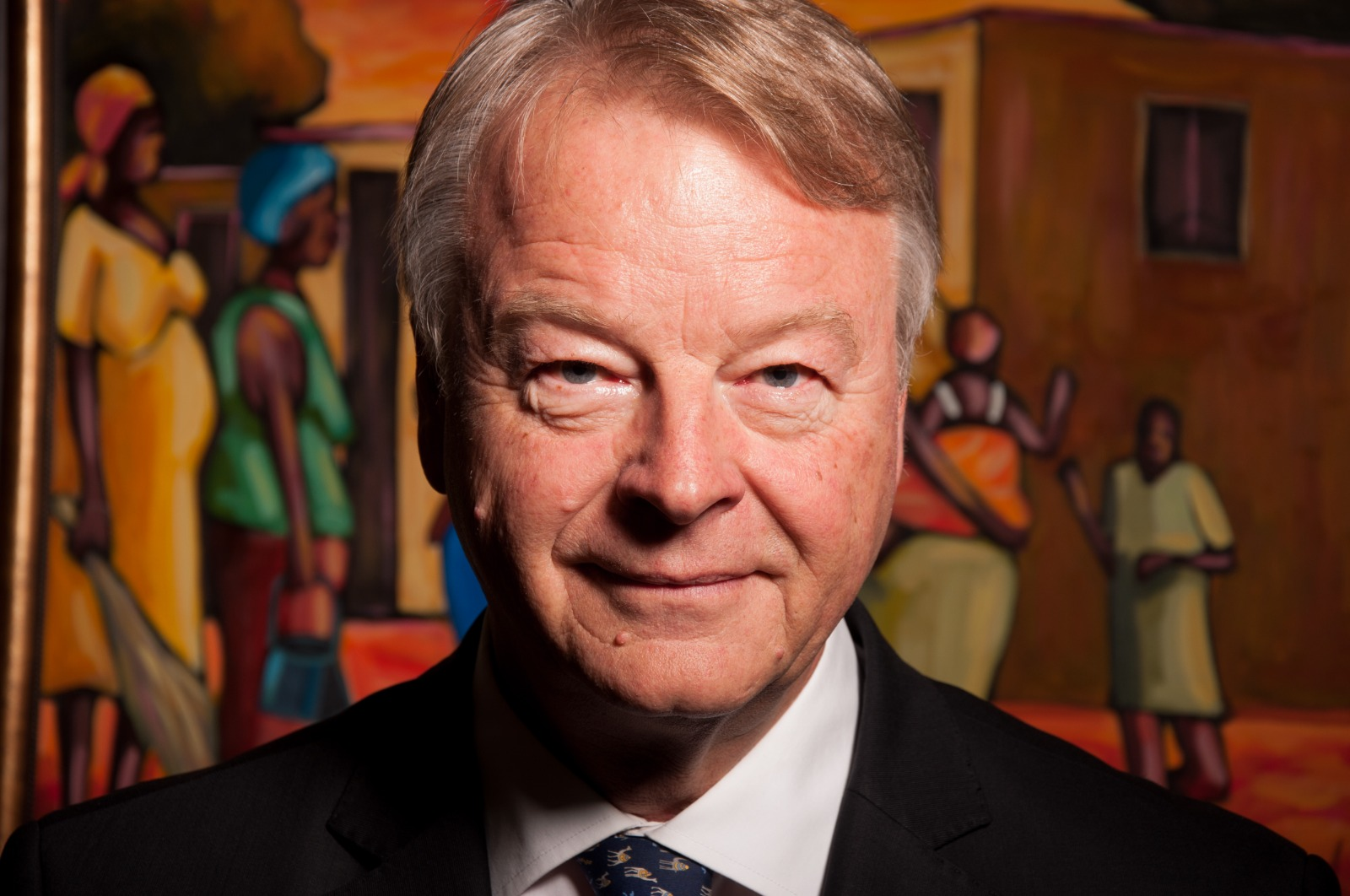
- Born: André Thomashausen
- Occupations: Emeritus University of South Africa legal scholar
- Known for: The dismantling of apartheid: the balance of reforms, 1978-1988. Pretoria, South Africa

Academic background
- Education: Kiel University

Academic work
- Discipline: Law
- Sub-discipline: Jurisprudence, legal system, public law, constitutional and administrative law
- Institutions: University of South Africa
- Main interests: Constitutionalism, law, politics and public administration

André Edgar Antonio Maria Thomashausen is a professor emeritus of international, comparative and constitutional law at the University of South Africa and a legal scholar with expertise in constitutional law, private and public international law, and law in African contexts. He is best known for negotiator of the Transitional Constitution of Namibia (1984-1985) and drafter for the South African Department of Water Affairs for the Lesotho Highlands Water Treaty, from 1983 to 1986.

== Biography ==
Thomashausen grew up in Portugal and pursued his studies across multiple countries, including France, Germany, and the United Kingdom. He completed his secondary education at the German School in Lisbon, earning German and Portuguese university entrance certificates.

His higher education journey saw him obtaining a law degree from Germany, followed by advanced legal qualifications, culminating in a doctorate with the summa cum laude from Christian Albrechts University in Kiel, Germany, in 1980. In 1979 he was awarded the "Förderpreis of Hermann-Ehlers Stiftung" in recognition for his contribution to the shaping of the Federal Republic of Germany into a free and social State.

His doctoral thesis focused on constitutional law in post-revolutionary Portugal.

== Career ==
Professional career

He began his career as a negotiator of the Transitional Constitution of Namibia (1984-1985) and drafter for the South African Department of Water Affairs, for the Lesotho Highlands Water Treaty, from 1983 to 1986. From 1990 to 1992, he was instrumental in negotiating and drafting the Rome General Peace Accords, serving as a special advisor to the United Nations Operation in Mozambique that implemented the General Peace Accord of 4 October 1992. His role in the modern history of Mozambique was detailed in a 30 minute documentary produced by Jean-Christophe Rufin and broadcast by ARTE TV channel in Europe on 25 July 2006. His work in peacebuilding continued in Angola, where from 1998 to 2004, he consulted with the Angolan president's office on conflict resolution and legal reforms, focusing later on naval rehabilitation and maritime security in the Southern Atlantic.

Since his admission to the Bar in Frankfurt in 2000, with leave to have chambers in South Africa, He has defended clients and contributed as an expert witness, to international commercial and family law trials, before senior courts in Angola, DRC, France, Germany, Latvia, Liberia, Mozambique, the Netherlands, Portugal, South Africa, the UK, and Zambia.

From 1986 to 1991, he was the Southern African regional representative for the Herbert Quandt Foundation, where he organized strategic workshops in anticipation of South Africa's political changes. Since 2004, he has been a Senior Council member of the Southern African German Chamber of Commerce and Industry where he is also a member of the Chambers Mediation Panel. In recent years, he has acted as a subject matter expert on government performance for UAE Federal Entities, working on excellence programs for the State of Ajman and Abu Dhabi since 2016.

Academic career

Thomashausen's academic career spans more than three decades, with his appointment as a professor of international law at UNISA in 1984. He has also served as the Institute of Foreign and Comparative Law Director at the university.

In addition to his teaching and research roles, he played a role in transforming the Department of Public, Constitutional, and International Law (PCI-Law) at UNISA into a racially integrated flagship department.

His publications are in several languages, including English, German, French, Portuguese, Turkish, and Mandarin. His areas of specialization include constitutional law, international commercial transactions, natural resources law, and anti-corruption law. He has published widely in Europe, China, and Africa, cementing his status as a globally recognized legal scholar. He is since 2012 a member of the European Academy of sciences.

== Views ==
Thomashausen advocates deepening economic and strategic ties between Portugal and Africa, mainly through the Community of Portuguese Language Countries (CPLP). He sees Africa's economic growth, increasing stability, and the influence of the BRICS as crucial factors strengthening the potential for cooperation between Portugal and its former colonies as well as generally for EU – Africa relation.

He has criticized the Mozambican authorities for their handling of post-election protests, highlighting significant legal and constitutional violations, in an interview with Deutsche Welle (DW), Thomashausen expressed concerns over the deployment of war-grade weaponry and armored vehicles against peaceful demonstrators.

== Selected publications ==
=== Journals ===
- Thomashausen, André (1981). "Verfassung und Verfassungswirklichkeit im neuen Portugal". Veröffentlichungen des Instituts für Internationales Recht an der Universität Kiel (in German).ISBN 3428048431
- Thomashausen, Andre E.; de Moura Ramos, Rui Manuel Gens (1984). "Direito Internacional Privado E Constituicao-Introduccao A Uma Analise Das Suas Relacoes". The American Journal of Comparative Law. 32 (3): 595. doi:10.2307/840431. JSTOR 840431.
- Thomashausen, André (2015). "(Foreign) Investment Strategies in Africa". Permanent Sovereignty over Natural Resources. pp. 155–172. doi:10.1007/978-3-319-15738-2_9. ISBN 978-3-319-15737-5.
- Thomashausen, André EAM (1984). "Some problems in the application of South African private international law". The Comparative and International Law Journal of Southern Africa. 17 (1): 78–91.JSTOR 23246923
- Thomashausen, André EAM (1985). "Local and regional autonomy: the comparative law approach to residential and spatial conflicts". The Comparative and International Law Journal of Southern Africa. 18 (3): 297–319.JSTOR 23246891
- Thomashausen, André (2005). "Constitutional Law in extreme emergencies: the Emerging New Constitution of Angola". Internationale Gemeinschaft und Menschenrechte: Festschrift für Georg Ress zum 70. Geburtstag am 21. Januar 2005, 2005, ISBN 3-452-25862-9, págs. 1295-1303. Carl Heymanns: 1295–1303.ISBN 3-452-25862-9

=== Books ===
- Thomashausen, André (1987). The dismantling of apartheid: the balance of reforms, 1978-1988. Pretoria, South Africa: A. Thomashausen. ISBN 978-0620118132.
- Thomashausen, André E. A. M. (1981). Verfassung und Verfassungswirklichkeit im neuen Portugal. Berlin: Duncker & Humblot. ISBN 978-3428048434.

== See also ==
- RENAMO
