= Ötzi (disambiguation) =

Ötzi a well-preserved natural mummy of a man who lived about 3,300 BCE.

Ötzi may also refer to:

- 5803 Ötzi, a main belt asteroid
- DJ Ötzi (born 1971), Austrian entertainer

== See also ==
- Odzi, a village in Zimbabwe, which is a near homophone
