= Naparama =

Militia in northern Mozambique

- Leaders: Manuel António (1988-1991) "Recing" †
- Dates active: 1988 - 1992; 2022 - present
- Active regions: Zambezia and Nampala provinces, Mozambique
- Size: 15,000-20,000
- Wars: Mozambican Civil War; Insurgency in Cabo Delgado

Naparama (from a local word meaning vaccinated) is a pro-government militia active in northern Mozambique in the late 1980s and early 1990s and still active since November 2022, since the start of the insurgency in Cabo Delgado.

== Rituals ==
=== Initiation ===
The "vaccination" ritual Manuel Antonio invented reportedly involved cutting necks and chests of teenage fighters with razor blades then rubbing ashes from an unidentified plant into them. Then the recruits are struck with a machete blade to test their invulnerability.

Antonio often during the ritual buried himself in dirt, then dug himself out and extinguished fire with his bare hands as a reenactment of Jesus resurrection.

=== Rules of conduct ===
Naparama fighters were prohibited from raping women, arguing and stealing from civilians, shaking hands with married people, having sex or eating before a battle. They were not allowed to use firearms and as a result mostly used spears and blade weapons. Naparam fighters were wearing red armbands to identify themselves. While going to battle they used to blow on horns and rattle tin cans while at the same time singing Christian songs to instill fear on enemies. They could not retreat, attempt to duck bullets or show fear. Breaching those tattoos would result in death of the combatant.

== Timeline ==
Naparama offensive 1989–1991

The group started in the Ribáuè District of the Nampula Province where traditional healer Manuel António created the first militia.

In March 1990 Manuel António entered the town of Alto Molocue. There he conducted multiple ceremonies recruiting more than 400 people into his group, before departing in late June. In the first offensive by the group Nacuaca was overran in March.

On 29 April 1990 Naparama overran RENAMO base at Nauela. They created a base in Nampevo village which they used to launch an attack Muaquiua base. Later Antonio moved the movement's headquarters to Mocuba, then to Nicoadala.

In mid-1990 Naparama forces captured large RENAMO base at Maciwa, followed by the Murrua district in July, and Mulevala in August.

In the late 1990 Naparama groups were set up in a camp for displaced people in Namagoa by António. Initially they conducted patrols around the camp before moving to Lugela after their victory at Muaquiua. At this point the local group numbered 240 fighters. Activities of the militia allowed many civilians to return to their homes contributing to their popularity. Next his forces entered the Namarroi District however they did not establish a permanent presence there except for a small outpost at Muémue which was disbanded after local army commander arrested them for threatening women.

=== Nampula province ===
The Naparama in the Nampula province developed independently from the main branch. Ambrósio Albino, one of Antonio's close confidants created his own militia in the Murrupula district together with traditional healer Nampila from the nearby Mothi village. Albino met Nampila in 1989 where he taught him how to make bullet-proof vaccine. In the Mecubúri district the first militia was formed in the Nahipa village by Nampila who vaccinated local youth. They proceeded then to recaptured the Mecubúri district town. In 1990 Ambrósio Albino moved to the Pebane district where he disappeared in 1991.

=== Decline ===
In May 1991 in Moma in Nampula rouge units were reportedly raping women, looting property and holding civilians hostage. António dismissed that these groups belonged to Naparama and accused RENAMO of sending them. On 20 May Naparama forces were defeated in a battle in Umuato with six fighters being killed.

In the second half of 1991 conflicts within the group, with Catholic Church as well as use by RENAMO of magic contributed to Naparama's decline.

On 29 June 1991 in a big blow to the group RENAMO managed to overran Lalaua killing 49 Naparama fighters displaying heads of some of them on shop shelves to show people their mortality.

On 5 December 1991 the leader of Naparama, Manuel António, was killed while defending the headquarters of a coconut plantation in the coastal town of Macuse against RENAMO attack. Nine other militia members and 25 RENAMO fighters were killed. His body, riddled with bullet holes and bayonet wounds, was taken to Quelimane and buried on 7 December. According to some claims his death was a result of betrayal by his mistress, his assistant, or a former Naparama member who had joined Renamo which has resulted in him losing the protective powers.

In late June 1992 the Mozambican government officially banned Naparama.

=== Resurgence after the Insurgency in Cabo Delgado ===
The Naparama movement re-emerged as a village self-defense militia in November 2022 after the Namuno, Balama and Montepuez districts have been attacked by the Islamic State. The movement clashed with Islamic State since its resurgence and rapidly grew in popularity, acting independently from the government with minimal government coordination with the militia. During the protests caused by electoral fraud in the 2024 Mozambican general election, the militia clashed with government troops after a group’s commander declared his intention to go to Maputo to “wage war” until the new president, Daniel Chapo, stepped down and let Venâncio Mondlane win the elections. The war with the government erupted in February 2025 when Naparama militias stormed local administrations in rural area of Nampula and Zambezia, Cabo Delgado, forcing the government troops to withdraw, killing over 50 in total.
