= Francisco Marcelino =

Mozambican politician and rebel leader (died 2006)

Francisco Xavier Marcelino (died 11 June 2006), nom de guerre José de Castro, was a Mozambican politician and former rebel leader who served as the director of external relations for the anti-communist RENAMO political movement, and later as a member of Mozambique's Assembly of the Republic (parliament).

Originally Marcelino was a clerk in the Zambezia Provincial Tribunal, but he was captured by RENAMO forces, took the name José de Castro, and eventually worked his way up in the hierarchy. In 1992 he became RENAMO's Director of External Affairs.

Following the Rome General Peace Accords (Acordo Geral de Paz or AGP), Dhlakama appointed de Casto as RENAMO's delegate at the Multi-Party Conference of 1993, which was charged with drawing up a new election law. His rejection of the FRELIMO proposed election law drew support from unaligned delegates, but stymied the conference which was adjourned sine die. Mozambique's new National Elections Commission (CNE) was only created after direct discussions between Dhlakama and Chissano. De Casto was rewarded for his steadfastness by being appointed RENAMO's head delegate in the CNE, a position he held from 1994 until 2004. De Casto only resigned in 2004 in order to run for parliament as a RENAMO candidate that year.

De Castro was General Secretary of RENAMO from 1995 to January 1998, when he was removed because Dhlakama said he wanted the party to be "more flexible". In November 2001, de Castro was elected into the party's Political Commission.

In the 2004 elections de Castro, as Francisco Marcelino, won a seat in the Assembly of the Republic from Nampula Province. He died in June 2006 before completing his five-year term.
