= Operation Punishment (1981) =

Mozambican Military Operation

- Part of the Mozambican Civil War
- Operation Punishment (1981) (Mozambique)
Date	4-7 December, 1981
Location	Southern Manica Province, Mozambique
Result	FRELIMO victory: Capture of RENAMO's Chicarre Base; Capture of ‘Garágua Documents’

Belligerents
People's Republic of Mozambique; Zimbabwe	RENAMO; Supported by: South Africa

Commanders and leaders
Tome Eduardo; Domingos Fondo	Afonso Dhlakama

Units involved
Mozambican Armed Forces: 2nd Brigade; Mozambique Air Force; Zimbabwe Defence Force	Female Detachment Personnel

Strength
1000+	520

Casualties and losses
Unknown	6 killed

In the Mozambican Civil War, Operation Punishment (Portuguese: Operação Punição) was a military operation by the FPLM aimed at capturing RENAMO’s Chicarre base (also known as Garágua) in southern Manica Province. The operation lasted a total of 3 days resulting in the fall of the base with the majority of rebels fleeing to other RENAMO controlled areas. Documents captured at Chicarre included meetings between RENAMO and South Africa that revealed military discussions, aid and cooperation providing concrete evidence that South Africa had been supporting RENAMO, a victory for FRELIMO.

== Prelude ==
Following the fall of RENAMO’s Sitatonga 2 base in June 1980 during Operation Leopard a rebel unit under the command of Lucas Muhlanga headed south to establish the new headquarters in Chicarre (also known as Garágua). The Chicarre base was located in a hilly and sparsely populated area in southern Manica Province which was roughly 26km from the Zimbabwe border and spanned approximately 20km in width.

Since August 1981, RENAMO was aware of the upcoming offensive on their Chicarre base due radio messages between the FPLM that were intercepted by South Africa which revealed a military build-up near the base. Following this intelligence one rebel column left Chicarre to meet up with rebels stationed at the Zinave National Park in Inhambane while another column left for Gorongosa.

== Battle ==
The plan for the offensive involved the Zimbabwean army sealing the border between Espungabera and Mávuè to stop any RENAMO escape attempts westward while a force of 1000 men led by Major General Tome Eduardo would advance on Chicarre from Machaze and elements of the 2nd Brigade led by Domingos Fondo would travel northwards across the Save River and strike Chicarre from the south.

The operation began on the 4th of December with an air assault using two MiG-17 fighter jets followed by a prolonged artillery bombardment. Soon after the operation began, many RENAMO rebels at Chicarre fled north to Mabudo Mountain and subsequently Jambe while others fled south to Chidoco and later northern Inhambane province. Mozambican forces soon ran into trouble as Fondo’s forces were unable to cross the Save River leaving only Eduardo’s forces to continue. The heaviest fighting of the operation began when FPLM forces reached the base of the mountain where rebels had taken up defensive positions. However, the base fell to FPLM forces on the 7th of December with the remaining rebels being airlifted by South Africa out of Mozambique. Following the offensive mop up operations took place finding any rebels scattered around the area.

== Aftermath ==
FPLM troops captured large quantities of equipment abandoned by rebels including 3000 small arms, 60 B10 mortar shells, bazooka rockets, hand grenades, medicine, radio transmitters and more. According to the military, only 83 of the 330 huts surrounding the base were still standing following the operation.

=== Garagua Documents ===
The documents captured at RENAMO’s base contained information on the rebel group’s activities in South Africa as well as trips that the group’s leadership took to Portugal, France and West Germany in search of support. The documents include meetings between RENAMO and SADF leadership who promised training, weapons and assistance with attacks within Mozambique. The documents also revealed that South Africa would stop supplying the group via air and would send supplies to the group via the Indian Ocean.

== Bibliography ==
- Emerson, Stephen A. (2014). The Battle for Mozambique: The Frelimo–Renamo Struggle, 1977–1992. Solihull, Pinetown: Helion & Company, 30° South Publishers. ISBN 978-1-909384-92-7.
- Cabrita, João M. (2000). Mozambique: The Tortuous Road to Democracy. London: Palgrave Macmillan. ISBN 978-1-349-42432-0.
- Robinson, David A. (2006). Curse on the Land: A History of the Mozambican Civil War (PDF). Perth.
