= Maluana massacre =

1987 massacre in Mozambique

- Part of the Mozambican Civil War
- Maluana (Mozambique)
- Location: Maluana, Maputo Province, Mozambique
- Date: 28 November 1987
- Attack type: Mass murder, Looting
- Deaths: 71 killed
- Injuries: 78 injured
- Perpetrator: RENAMO

The Maluana massacre was a massacre of civilians traveling along the North-South Highway near the town of Maluana, Mozambique which is approximately 30 miles north of the capital of Maputo. The massacre was carried out by RENAMO rebels who ambushed a large civilian vehicle convoy which was traveling northward. Similar massacres had occurred nearby in the previous months such as the Taninga Massacres with RENAMO aiming to cut the capital of Maputo off from the rest of the country.

== Massacre ==
The attack occurred in the afternoon on 28 November when a large group of RENAMO rebels opened fire from both sides of the road towards a large vehicle convoy with machine guns and bazookas. The civilian convoy was accompanied by a military escort which was common due to other massacres nearby during the previous months, but the military was vastly outgunned and unable to put up an effective resistance against the rebels. It was only until the military escort called in support from the air force that the rebels dispersed. By the end of the massacre rebels had killed a total of 71 civilians and injured another 78 as well as destroying a total of 32 vehicles, including a USAID truck. The military escort lost 2 soldiers and killed 4 RENAMO rebels. Survivors of the attack also recounted widespread looting by rebels.

== Aftermath ==
Following the massacre two separate funeral services were held in the capital Maputo which were attended by thousands of citizens.

== See also ==
- Second Taninga Massacre

== Bibliography ==
- Robinson, David A. (2006). Curse on the Land: A History of the Mozambican Civil War (PDF). Perth.
