= Murrua =

- Location within Mozambique
- Coordinates: 16.3585947°S 37.7638532°E
- Country: Mozambique
- Provinces: Zambezia Province
- District: Mulevala District

Murrua or Marrua is a village in Zambezia province in Mozambique.

== Mining ==
Morrua mine is located near the town.

== History ==
In July 1990 the town was captured by Naparama militia.
