= Maluana, Mozambique =

Village in Mozambique

Maluana
- Village
- Interactive map of Maluana
- Coordinates: 25.4949°S 32.6527°E
- Country: Mozambique
- Province: Maputo

Maluana is a village in Maputo Province, Mozambique, approximately 53 kilometres (33 mi) north of the capital Maputo. It is the home of Maluana Science and Technology Park. The Science Park contains a data centre.

The Maluana massacre occurred nearby in 1987.
