= Mulevala District =

Coordinates: 16.4335°S 37.5921°E

Mulevala District is a district of Zambezia Province in Mozambique.

== History ==
The town used to be a Portuguese post, with Abel Maria Ferreira reportedly being the post chief in 1916. In August 1990 the district town was captured by Naparama militia.
