= Second Taninga massacre =

1987 massacre in Mozambique

- Part of the Mozambican Civil War
- Taninga (Mozambique)
- Location: Taninga, Maputo Province, Mozambique
- Date: 28 October 1987
- Attack type: Mass murder, Looting
- Deaths: 278 killed
- Perpetrator: RENAMO

The Second Taninga massacre (Portuguese: Segundo Massacre de Taninga) was a massacre of civilians who were travelling along the North-South road near Taninga in Maputo Province, Mozambique on 28 October 1987. RENAMO rebels perpetrated the attack killing 278 civilians, many of whom were women and children, though RENAMO denied involvement in the massacre, accusing government forces of carrying out the attack. The massacre was the second to take place near Taninga with the first massacre taking place only 12 days prior on 16 October leading to the deaths of 53 people.

== Massacre ==
Near the town of Taninga which is approximately 80km north of Maputo a large convoy of vehicles was traveling north from Maputo towards Gaza and Inhambane provinces. The vehicles were stopped because they were waiting for the military convoy to arrive to escort the vehicles which was fairly ordinary for long distance road trips in Mozambique to protect against RENAMO attacks. Whilst waiting some travellers remained in their vehicles while others visited a busy marketplace nearby. However, when the military convoy arrived at around 2 pm the rebels opened fire from nearby ditches using machine guns, mortars and bazookas. After the ambush started the government soldiers retreated and mayhem broke out with civilians trying to escape. One survivor, Rosa Jose, recounted "I don’t know how it happened. I was traveling in my uncle’s car. Suddenly I heard shooting from all directions." There were at least 300 rebels present during the attack with a survivor recounting some rebels were as young as 10 years old. RENAMO destroyed at least 80 vehicles along a 4km stretch of road and shot victims trying to flee from the buses as well as burning buses full of civilians. One survivor said that he witnessed rebels throwing children into a burning bus. Some civilians managed to escape towards the bush near the highway but were lured out by rebels and then fired upon. Mass lootings were also reported with Rosa Jose saying "I saw a group of five bandits unloading sacks of sugar from a truck, and others were stealing things from cars belonging to miners returning from South Africa." The Mozambican government said they battled the rebels for 7 hours before they withdrew.

== Aftermath ==
Following the attack wounded survivors were evacuated to hospitals in Maputo, Manhica and Xinavane. Journalists arrived in Taninga soon after the massacre and reported seeing bodies lying in a 500-metre radius of the road with flames still burning from some vehicles. Lorries owned by Italian, Dutch, Swedish and development agencies were also destroyed during the attack.

RENAMO released a statement in Lisbon denying responsibility for the massacre and accusing the Mozambican government of carrying out the massacre in order to blame it on RENAMO.

=== International Reactions ===
- European Union: Andre Oclair, the assistant director general of the European Communities Commission said that he was 'deeply shocked' at the news of the massacre during his visit to Maputo.
- United States: US Ambassador to Mozambique Melissa Wells visited Taninga following the massacre and described RENAMO as 'bandits and terrorists'.
- India: Indian Prime Minister Rajiv Gandhi condemned the massacre and sent a message to Mozambican President Joaquim Chissano expressing his 'sincere feelings of the Indian Government and people for the massacre.' Rajiv Gandhi also called for the elimination of the apartheid regime in South African which supported RENAMO.
- Vatican City: Pope John Paul II offered his condolences and prayers to the victims of the massacre.

== Bibliography ==
- Emerson, Stephen A. (2014). The Battle for Mozambique: The Frelimo–Renamo Struggle, 1977–1992. Solihull, Pinetown: Helion & Company, 30° South Publishers. ISBN 978-1-909384-92-7.
