= Rome General Peace Accords =

1992 treaty ending the Mozambican Civil War

General Peace Accords
- Type: Peace treaty
- Context: Cold War; Mozambican Civil War
- Signed: October 4, 1992; 33 years ago (Note: RENAMO declared the treaty void on October 21, 2013.)
- Location: Rome, Italy
- Mediators: Andrea Riccardi; Matteo Zuppi; Jaime Gonçalves; Mario Raffaelli
- Signatories: Joaquim Chissano (President of Mozambique); Afonso Dhlakama (Leader of RENAMO)
- Parties: Mozambique; RENAMO

The Rome General Peace Accords, officially the General Peace Accords (Portuguese: Acordo Geral de Paz), was a peace treaty signed between the government of Mozambique and RENAMO, ending the Mozambican Civil War on October 4, 1992. Negotiations preceding the agreement began in July 1990. They were brokered by a team of four mediators, two members of the Community of Sant'Egidio, Andrea Riccardi and Matteo Zuppi, as well as Bishop Jaime Gonçalves and Italian government representative Mario Raffaelli. The delegation of the Mozambican government was headed by Armando Guebuza, who went on to become President of Mozambique. The RENAMO delegation consisted of Raul Domingos, José de Castro, Vicente Ululu, Agostinho Murrial, João Almirante, José Augusto and Anselmo Victor. The accords were then signed by the then-president of Mozambique Joaquim Chissano, and by the leader of RENAMO, Afonso Dhlakama.

RENAMO declared on October 21, 2013, that they were annulling the peace accord as a result of a government attack on their base.

== See also ==
- Mozambican Civil War
- Sant'Egidio platform – a January 13, 1995 proclamation of importance to the Algerian Civil War.
