= André Matsangaissa =

Mozambican rebel leader (1950–1979)

André Matade Matsangaissa
- Born: 1950; Chirara, Manica Province, Portuguese Mozambique
- Died: 17 October 1979 (aged 28–29); Gorongosa, Sofala Province, Mozambique
- Occupation: Guerilla commander
- Military career
- Allegiance: FRELIMO (1972–1975); RENAMO (1977–1979)
- Service years: 1972–1979
- Conflicts: Mozambican War of Independence; Mozambican Civil War

André Matsangaissa (also spelled Matsangaiza; 1950 – 17 October 1979) was a Mozambican anti-communist rebel and the first leader of the Rhodesian-backed Mozambican National Resistance (RENAMO).

Born in Chirara, Mozambique, Matsangaissa joined FRELIMO in 1972, during the Mozambican War of Independence, and after FRELIMO's victory in 1975 he became a quartermaster stationed at Dondo, near Beira. He was punished for theft by being expelled from the Mozambican Army and was placed in a re-education camp at Gorongosa. He was freed during an attack on the camp by Rhodesian forces and was taken to Rhodesia. In 1977, Matsangaissa was appointed by the Rhodesians as leader of the Mozambican National Resistance (RENAMO) in an effort to indigenize the rebel group. Matsangaissa was killed in action in a 1979 raid against FRELIMO in Sofala Province, Mozambique.

Former members of RENAMO commemorated his death in Gorongosa on 17 October 1997, although the town administrator rejected their plan to build a tomb in his memory. In June 2007, a municipal roundabout in the city of Beira was renamed after Matsangaissa by the Beira Municipal Assembly, then under the control of RENAMO. In the elections of 2008, FRELIMO reassumed control of the Assembly and attempted to return the roundabout to its old name.

== Sources ==
- Azevedo, Mario; Nnadozie, Emmanuel & Mbuia, Tomé (2003). Historical Dictionary of Mozambique (2nd ed.). Lanham, Maryland: Scarecrow Press. ISBN 978-0-8108-3792-8.
- Igreja, Victor (June 2013). "Politics of Memory, Decentralisation and Recentralisation in Mozambique" (PDF). Journal of Southern African Studies. 39 (2): 313–335. doi:10.1080/03057070.2013.795809.
- Cabrita, João M. (2000). Mozambique: The Tortuous Road to Democracy. London: Palgrave Macmillan. ISBN 978-1-349-42432-0.
- Fauvet, P. (1984) Roots of counter-revolution: the Mozambique National Resistance
