= Macuse =

Coordinates: 17°42′25″S 37°11′22″E

Macuse is a coastal town in Mozambique.

It is a short distance to the northeast of the river port of Quelimane.

== Transport ==
It is near the site of a proposed port and railhead for the export of coal. The exact site of the port is highly variable.

== See also ==
- Railway stations in Mozambique
- Transport in Mozambique
