= Gorongosa =

Town in Mozambique

Coordinates: 18°41′S 34°04′E

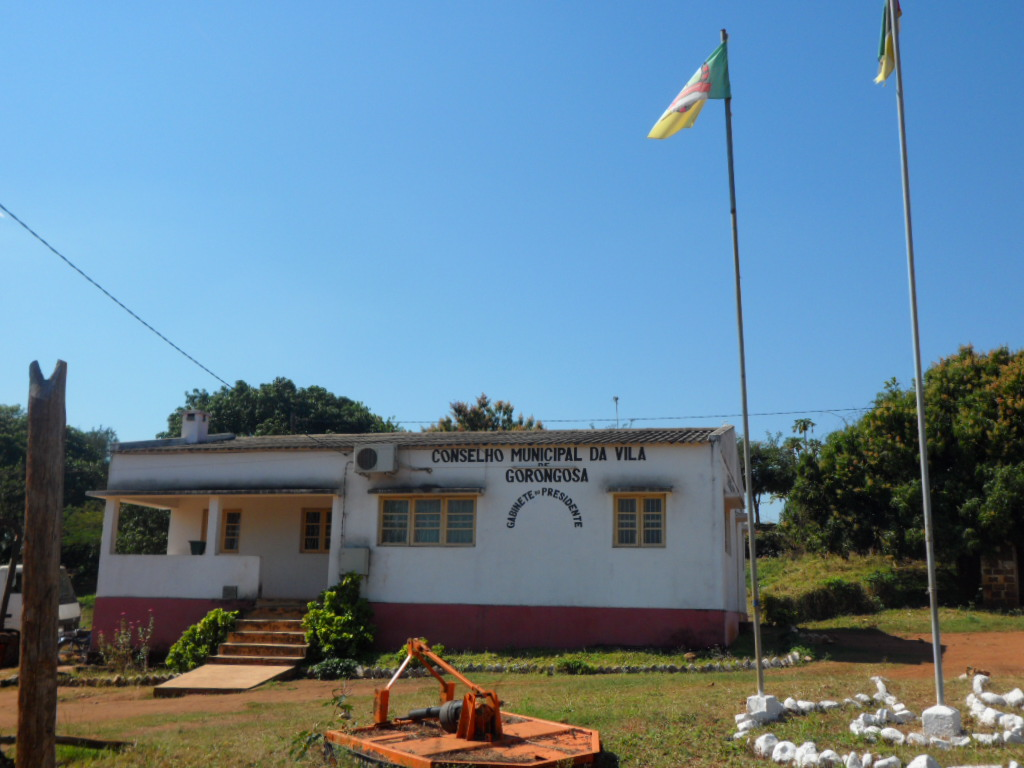

Gorongosa is a town and the administrative center of Gorongosa District of Mozambique, situated on the country's main north-south highway (the EN1). Mount Gorongosa is north of the town, and Gorongosa National Park is a few kilometers east of the town.
