= Odzi =

Village in Zimbabwe

Coordinates: 18°58′S 32°22′E

Odzi is a small urban settlement, born out of a railway station in Manicaland Province, Zimbabwe located 32 km west of Mutare just off the main Harare-Mutare road. Odzi was established as a railway siding in 1899. It serves as a small trading centre in a tobacco and mix farming region. Petalite, Tantalite and tungsten ores are mined in the area.
