= RENAMO =

Mozambican political party

Mozambican National Resistance Resistência Nacional Moçambicana
- Abbreviation: RENAMO
- President: Ossufo Momade
- Secretary-General: Clementina Bomba
- Founder: André Matsangaissa
- Founded: May 1977
- Headquarters: Avenida Ahmed Sekou Touré Nº 657, Maputo
- Youth wing: RENAMO Youth League
- Ideology: Mozambican nationalism Conservatism; Economic liberalism Anti-communism
- Political position: Centre-right to right-wing
- Continental affiliation: Democrat Union of Africa
- International affiliation: Centrist Democrat International (observer)
- Assembly of the Republic: 28 / 250

Party flag
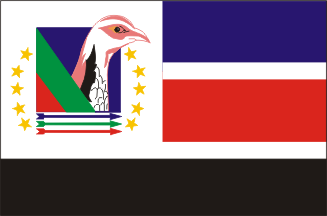

Website
- www.renamo.org.mz

RENAMO (from the Portuguese Resistência Nacional Moçambicana, lit. 'Mozambican National Resistance') is a Mozambican political party and militant group. The party was founded with the active sponsorship of the Rhodesian Central Intelligence Organisation (CIO) in May 1977 from anti-communist dissidents opposed to Mozambique's ruling FRELIMO party. RENAMO was initially led by André Matsangaissa, a former senior official in FRELIMO's armed wing, and was composed of several anti-communist dissident groups which appeared immediately prior to, and shortly following, Mozambican independence. Matsangaissa, who died in 1979, was succeeded by Afonso Dhlakama, who led the organization until he died in 2018. He was succeeded by Ossufo Momade.

Critics of RENAMO frequently described the movement as a proxy of Rhodesia, and subsequently, South Africa's apartheid government. It has been theorised that RENAMO was formed for the sole purpose of countering FRELIMO support for the Zimbabwe African National Liberation Army (ZANLA). On the other hand, RENAMO was also reflective of FRELIMO's own splintering support base and dwindling popularity in the immediate post-independence era. Its political programme centered around the abandonment of FRELIMO's socialist policies, the adoption of a free market economy, and more traditionalist concerns such as the reinstatement of traditional ethnic leaders to positions of authority. RENAMO's ranks included a number of Mozambican political exiles who genuinely opposed FRELIMO on principle, including FRELIMO defectors disillusioned with its Marxist–Leninist ideology, but also large numbers of recruits conscripted by force.

With Rhodesian support, RENAMO commenced an insurgency against the FRELIMO government in 1977, sparking the Mozambican Civil War. The war was characterised by severe human rights violations on both sides and crippled the already debilitated Mozambican economy. RENAMO and FRELIMO acceded to the Rome General Peace Accords in October 1992, which ended FRELIMO's one-party state and introduced multi-party democratic elections. In return, RENAMO pledged to abandon its armed struggle and conduct its future activities by political means within the framework of the new electoral system. Following the end of the war, RENAMO was responsible for promoting constitutional reforms as well as the promotion of a strong domestic private sector.

Renewed clashes broke out between RENAMO's militant forces and the FRELIMO government in 2013. RENAMO resumed its insurgency, citing state corruption and electoral fraud perpetrated by FRELIMO officials. A second peace agreement was reached between RENAMO and FRELIMO in August 2019, resulting in the virtual end of the insurgency. A RENAMO splinter group known as the RENAMO Military Junta (RMJ) was quickly formed from party dissidents opposed to the peace process; the RMJ continued to carry out minor guerrilla operations until December 2021, when the last of its members surrendered to Mozambican security forces.

== History ==
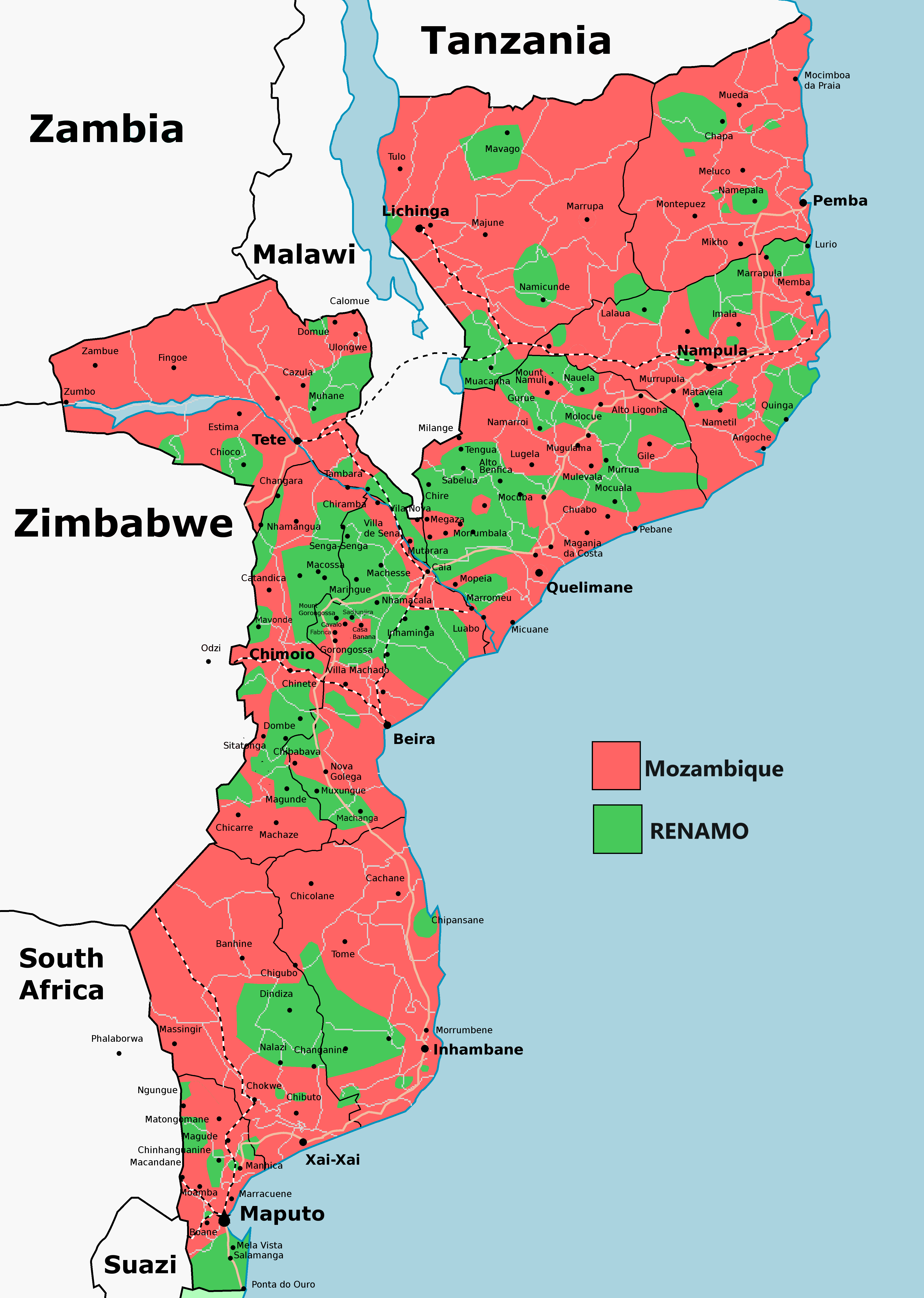
RENAMO-held areas in 1994

=== Independence and formation ===
From the early 1960s to the mid-1970s, Portugal fought a series of bitter counter-insurgency conflicts against independence movements in its three primary African colonies—Angola, Mozambique, and Guinea-Bissau. In Mozambique, the armed struggle against colonial rule was spearheaded by the Front for the Liberation of Mozambique (FRELIMO), which was initially formed in exile in neighbouring Tanzania. FRELIMO recruited from Mozambican migrant workers and intellectuals living abroad, where they had been exposed to the emerging popularity of anti-colonial and nationalist causes overseas. Its political programme was anti-colonial, but also anti-traditionalist; FRELIMO leaders planned to wrest social and political power from the Portuguese administration, as well as on the grassroots level from local tribal authorities. The party also envisioned a radical restructuring of post-colonial Mozambican society in accordance with the principles of scientific socialism. In September 1964, FRELIMO initiated an armed insurgency. Its decision to take up arms was influenced by a number of internal and external factors, namely the recent successes of indigenous anti-colonial guerrilla movements in French Indochina and French Algeria, as well as encouragement from contemporary African statesmen such as Ahmed Ben Bella, Gamal Abdel Nasser, and Julius Nyerere. FRELIMO insurgents initially received training primarily in North Africa and the Middle East in countries such as Algeria, with the Soviet Union and People's Republic of China providing military equipment. FRELIMO established a permanent foothold in underdeveloped northern Mozambique and began expanding its operations southwards, reaching the central provinces by 1973. Portugal responded with increasingly large scale search and destroy operations and strengthening military and intelligence ties to the neighbouring states of Rhodesia and South Africa, then ruled by white minority governments sympathetic to the colonial regime. FRELIMO, in turn, forged an informal alliance with a Rhodesian insurgent movement, the Zimbabwe African National Liberation Army (ZANLA). ZANLA insurgents were permitted to infiltrate Rhodesian territory from FRELIMO-held areas of Mozambique, inexorably linking the Mozambican conflict to the Rhodesian Bush War.

The 1974 Carnation Revolution and the collapse of Portugal's right-wing Estado Novo government plunged Lisbon into turmoil and brought to power a military junta known as the Armed Forces Movement. The Portuguese junta was committed to divesting itself of the colonies and ending the increasingly costly African wars. The resulting confusion among the metropole's military forces in Mozambique allowed FRELIMO to wrest control of large sections of the territory from the Portuguese. In the absence of Portuguese repression, a number of new Mozambican political parties, including some formed by FRELIMO splinter factions, appeared and began campaigning for support. Portugal announced it would initiate a political transition in Mozambique simultaneously with multi-party elections prior to independence, but FRELIMO condemned the proposal. The party's leadership, headed by Samora Machel, countered that it was the sole legitimate representative of the Mozambican people, and demanded it be permitted to take power directly, without multi-party elections. In early September 1974, Portugal announced it would comply with FRELIMO's request. Portuguese officials promised that after nine months, the positions of local government would be handed to FRELIMO appointees, and no elections would be held.

The decision to effect a direct transfer of power to FRELIMO, without a local referendum or elections, was greeted with trepidation by South Africa and Rhodesia. It also resulted in an exodus of Portuguese settlers, FRELIMO dissidents, and indigenous troops who had served with Portuguese auxiliary units, including the elite Flechas, fearing retribution under the new regime. Many of the new exiles fled to Rhodesia, where they were recruited as assets by the Rhodesian Central Intelligence Organisation (CIO). The most prominent anti-FRELIMO exile in Rhodesia was Orlando Cristina, a former member of the colonial security services in Mozambique who had served as a regional liaison with the Rhodesian government. Cristina set up a Portuguese-language radio broadcasting station, known as Voz da Africa Livre, which broadcast anti-communist and anti-FRELIMO messages into Mozambique. Cristina's broadcasts called attention to human rights violations committed by FRELIMO, including the detention of party dissidents, and accused FRELIMO of betraying Mozambican nationalism by pandering to the Marxist ideology of the Soviet Union. The CIO hoped to use Voz da Africa Livre to recruit disaffected Mozambicans for an anti-FRELIMO paramilitary force. One such recruit was André Matsangaissa, a former FRELIMO official who had been imprisoned by the party in a re-education camp following the transfer of power; Matsangaissa had subsequently escaped to Rhodesia and was familiar with Cristina's broadcasts. Matsangaissa met with Cristina and argued that hostile radio messages alone could not change the political situation in Mozambique; armed struggle was necessary. Shortly thereafter, the CIO recruited Matsangaissa as the leader for its new anti-FRELIMO force. The militants received guerrilla training from the CIO and were infiltrated back into Mozambique, where they conducted surveillance of ZANLA movements at the Rhodesians' behest. In February 1977, the unit demonstrated its ability to carry out autonomous operations when it stormed a FRELIMO re-education camp in Sofala Province, freeing the detainees there. During a meeting at Cristina's home in May 1977, the unit's leadership formally adopted the title Resistência Nacional Moçambicana (RENAMO).

=== Later activity ===
RENAMO unified with another rebel group, the Revolutionary Party of Mozambique (PRM) in 1982. As a result of this merger, the rebel group was able to expand its operations in northern Mozambique, particularly in Zambezia Province. In 1984 the South African and Mozambican governments signed the Nkomati Accord, in which the South African National Party minority regime promised to stop sponsoring RENAMO operations if the Mozambican government expelled exiled members of the African National Congress (ANC) residing there. This was consistent with the Total National Strategy pursued by the National Party regime, utilizing threats of military reprisals to force Mozambique into subjugation under the Afrikaner nationalists hegemonial ambitions in the region. In 1988, RENAMO experienced its only major split during the civil war, when former PRM commander Gimo Phiri broke off and founded an independent insurgent group known as Mozambican National Union (UNAMO).

While the Mozambican government did shut down the local ANC offices and its operations in accordance with the Nkomati Accord, the National Party government of South Africa continued funnelling financial and military resources to RENAMO. A permanent peace accord was reached only in 1992, monitored by the United Nations Operation in Mozambique (UNOMOZ) until its finalisation in 1994. This process went on simultaneously to the negotiations between the National Party minority government and the ANC about the termination of Apartheid policies and the transformation to a democratic dispensation in South Africa. The South African National Intelligence Service initiated the Operation Bush Talk, which was designed to phase out the National Party's longstanding substantial support to RENAMO and allow their proxy to accommodate to the new regional realities.

The peace accord led to the disarmament of RENAMO, the integration of some of its fighters into the Mozambican army, and its transformation into a regular political party. It is now the main opposition party in Mozambique. At the legislative elections on 1 and 2 December 2004, the party was the main part of the Renamo-UE electoral alliance, which won 29.7% of the popular vote and 90 out of 250 seats. The presidential candidate of this alliance, Afonso Dhlakama, won 31.7% of the popular vote.

Raul Domingos, negotiator at the Rome General Peace Accords and RENAMO's leader in parliament from 1994 to 1999, was expelled from the party in 2000, and in 2003, founded the Party for Peace, Democracy, and Development.

=== Activities in Zimbabwe ===
RENAMO forces attacked an army base in Zimbabwe near Mukosa on 17 June 1987, killing seven soldiers and wounding 19. RENAMO attacked the Katiyo Tea Estate, destroying valuable property, in July and killed three men in Rushinga in August. On 30 November, RENAMO militants burned down 13 houses.

Between December 1987 and 21 January 1988, RENAMO performed 101 attacks near the Mozambique-Zimbabwe border. Following the end of the Mozambican Civil War, RENAMO remained linked to a Zimbabwean militant group, Chimwenje.

=== International dimension and Human Rights record ===
Apart from their primary supporters, initially the Rhodesian Central Intelligence Organisation until 1979 and afterwards, the South African Directorate of Special Tasks (DST), RENAMO also enjoyed some level of international recognition, support and funding. Chester Crocker, then the Assistant Secretary of State for African Affairs in the US State Department, viewed RENAMO as "African Khmer Rouge". While RENAMO styled itself as "anti-communist", its brutal conduct and lack of political legitimacy made the organisation unsuitable as a partner, since it jeopardised the State Department attempts to gain rapport with the FRELIMO government and the Mozambican population, in order to increase the Western Bloc's influence on the region. Contrary to that stance stood the active engagement of the far-right Heritage Foundation for the cause of RENAMO.

West German academic Andre Thomashausen and his mentor Werner Kaltefleiter served as vital links between West German right-wing conservative, anti-socialist political circles and RENAMO. Thomashausen is alleged to have had close links to both the West German and apartheid South African intelligence services, while being officially employed as a professor at the University of South Africa and in various managerial positions (in particular for West German corporations engaged in the apartheid economy) since 1982, when he moved to South Africa and immediately was granted citizenship by the National Party minority government. Thomashausen acted as a confidante and an advisor to the RENAMO leadership. A related network of West German RENAMO lobbyists evolved around the Bavarian minister-president and leader of the conservative CSU party Franz Josef Strauss. Strauss engaged in his own far-right foreign policy in support of apartheid and anti-socialist paramilitary forces in Southern Africa, thereby undermining the official détente policy of the West German federal government.

RENAMO conduct has frequently been described by western authors as amounting to terrorism, especially since it usually involved attacks against defenseless civilians. The forcible recruitment of kidnapped villagers, including underage children, formed RENAMO's main mode of increasing its membership. This often included the murder of close relatives of the kidnapped persons, so that they had no way of returning to their communities.The organisation also engaged in brutal publicly staged killings of perceived traitors and dissidents.

== Renewed clashes ==
In October 2012, RENAMO's headquarters were relocated near Casa Banana (also named Sathunjira, RENAMO's former guerrilla base in the 1980s) in Gorongosa, where a training camp was set up for around 800 partially armed followers. Previously, the headquarters had been moved from Maputo to Nampula in 2009. RENAMO leader Afonso Dhlakama threatened to "destroy the country" if his political demands were not met.

On 4 April 2013, one woman and four police officers were killed, with ten policemen more injured in a RENAMO attack on a police station in the town of Muxengue. The leader of the attackers was also killed. RENAMO's security chief stated that the action was a response to previous police raids on RENAMO gatherings. Around 300 RENAMO members had remained armed since the 1992 peace deal, despite efforts to integrate them into the army or police.

On 6 April 2013, two or three civilians were killed and two women were injured when alleged RENAMO militiamen attacked a truck and a bus in Chibabava District. RENAMO denied being involved in the attack.

On 21 June, suspected RENAMO guerrillas attacked a bus in Machanga, Sofala Province, injuring an elderly woman. The incident happened two days after RENAMO threatened to paralyse key roads and the only coal export train to force the FRELIMO government to renegotiate peace terms.

On 17 October, suspected RENAMO guerrillas ambushed a military patrol near Gorongosa, RENAMO's stronghold, killing seven soldiers, according to local media. On 18 October, another clash between Mozambican Armed Forces (FADM) and RENAMO militiamen took place in Mucodza, seven kilometres away from Gorongosa. National director of defence policy in the Ministry of Defence, Colonel Cristovao Chume, claimed that the soldiers suffered no losses and that a RENAMO fighter was injured and captured by their forces. RENAMO leader Dhlakama claimed that no RENAMO fighters were killed on the attack, which, according to him, was started by the Army, and that the casualties had been suffered by the FADM. However, reporters confirmed that the bodies of two RENAMO fighters were in the local morgue of Gorongosa.

On 21 October, FADM forces captured Sathunjira base after several days of combat. RENAMO spokesman Fernando Mazanga claimed that the government forces had shelled the base with heavy weapons (artillery), and that Afonso Dhlakama had fled the base. A RENAMO statement said that the capture of the base puts an end to the 1992 peace deal. RENAMO announced that MP Armindo Milaco was killed in the government raid. On 22 October, gunmen attacked a police station in Maringué District in apparent retaliation, with no casualties reported.

On 26 October, alleged RENAMO fighters attacked civilian vehicles in the main north–south highway near Beira, killing one and injuring 10 people. RENAMO denied its implication in the attack.

=== 2014 peace process ===
On 5 September 2014 Dhlakama and president Guebuza signed a peace deal in an effort to end the two-year period of instability. The deal included integration of RENAMO forces into the army and a reform of the election oversight commission. However, after RENAMO's refusal to accept the 2014 presidential elections, problems in the implementation of the peace deal and after continued efforts by government forces to disarm RENAMO met resistance, Dhlakama broke off the peace process in August 2015. Since then there have been renewed clashes between government and RENAMO forces. Dhlakama claimed there were two attempts by the government to assassinate him.

=== 2017 truce ===
In May 2017, RENAMO agreed to extend their truce indefinitely.

== Death of Dhlakama and its impact ==
On 3 May 2018, Afonso Dhlakama, who led RENAMO since 1979, died in Gorongosa after suffering a heart attack. An unnamed official in RENAMO acknowledged this and also stated that Dhlakma had been ill prior to his death. Regarding the future of RENAMO following Dhlakama's death, Ed Hobey Hamsher, an analyst with Maplecroft, stated that "no potential successor has Dhlakama's stature" and that anybody who succeeds him "will struggle to unify Renamo's factions." At the time of Dhlakama's death, the RENAMO Congress was unable to fix a date to vote on a successor. The next month on 14 June 2018, Ossufo Momade, who was picked to serve as the interim leader of RENAMO until the organization's Congress could vote on a permanent successor to Dhlakama, went into hiding.

== Peace deal reached between RENAMO and Mozambique government ==
On 1 August 2019, Mozambique President Filipe Nyusi and RENAMO leader Ossufo Momade signed a peace agreement bringing an end to the six-year period of armed clashes. They also shook hands and embraced each other as well. The signing of the peace took place at RENAMO's remote military base in the Gorongosa mountains. After the agreement was signed, the last remaining RENAMO fighters surrendered their weapons. Momade told the Associated Press "We will no longer commit the mistakes of the past." He also stated "We are for a humanized and dignified reintegration and we want the international community to help make that a reality." During another signing which took in Maputo's peace square, Momade declared the group would focus to "maintain peace and national reconciliation."

== Election results ==
=== Presidential elections ===
Election	Party candidate	Votes	%	Result
1994	Afonso Dhlakama	1,666,965	33.73%	Lost ✗
1999	Afonso Dhlakama	2,134,255	47.70%	Lost ✗
2004	Afonso Dhlakama	998,059	31.74%	Lost ✗
2009	Afonso Dhlakama	650,679	16.41%	Lost ✗
2014	Afonso Dhlakama	1,783,382	36.61%	Lost ✗
2019	Ossufo Momade	1,356,786	21.84%	Lost ✗
2024	Ossufo Momade	448,738	6.62%	Lost ✗

=== Assembly elections ===
Election	Party leader	Votes	%	Seats	+/−	Position	Result
1994	Afonso Dhlakama	1,803,506	37.78%	112 / 250	▲112	▲2nd	Opposition
1999	Afonso Dhlakama	1,604,470	38.79%	117 / 250	▲5	2nd	Opposition
2004	Afonso Dhlakama	905,289	29.73%	90 / 250	▼27	2nd	Opposition
2009	Afonso Dhlakama	688,782	17.69%	51 / 250	▼39	2nd	Opposition
2014	Afonso Dhlakama	1,495,137	32.46%	89 / 250	▲38	2nd	Opposition
2019	Ossufo Momade	1,351,659	22.28%	60 / 250	▼29	2nd	Opposition
2024	Ossufo Momade	557,724	8.11%	28 / 250	▼32	▼3rd	Opposition

== Former RENAMO flags ==
First flag of RENAMO

Second flag of RENAMO

== See also ==
- Heads of the National Resistance Government of Mozambique
