= Mozambican Civil War =

1977–1992 civil war in southeast Africa

- Part of the aftermath of the Mozambican War of Independence, and the Cold War
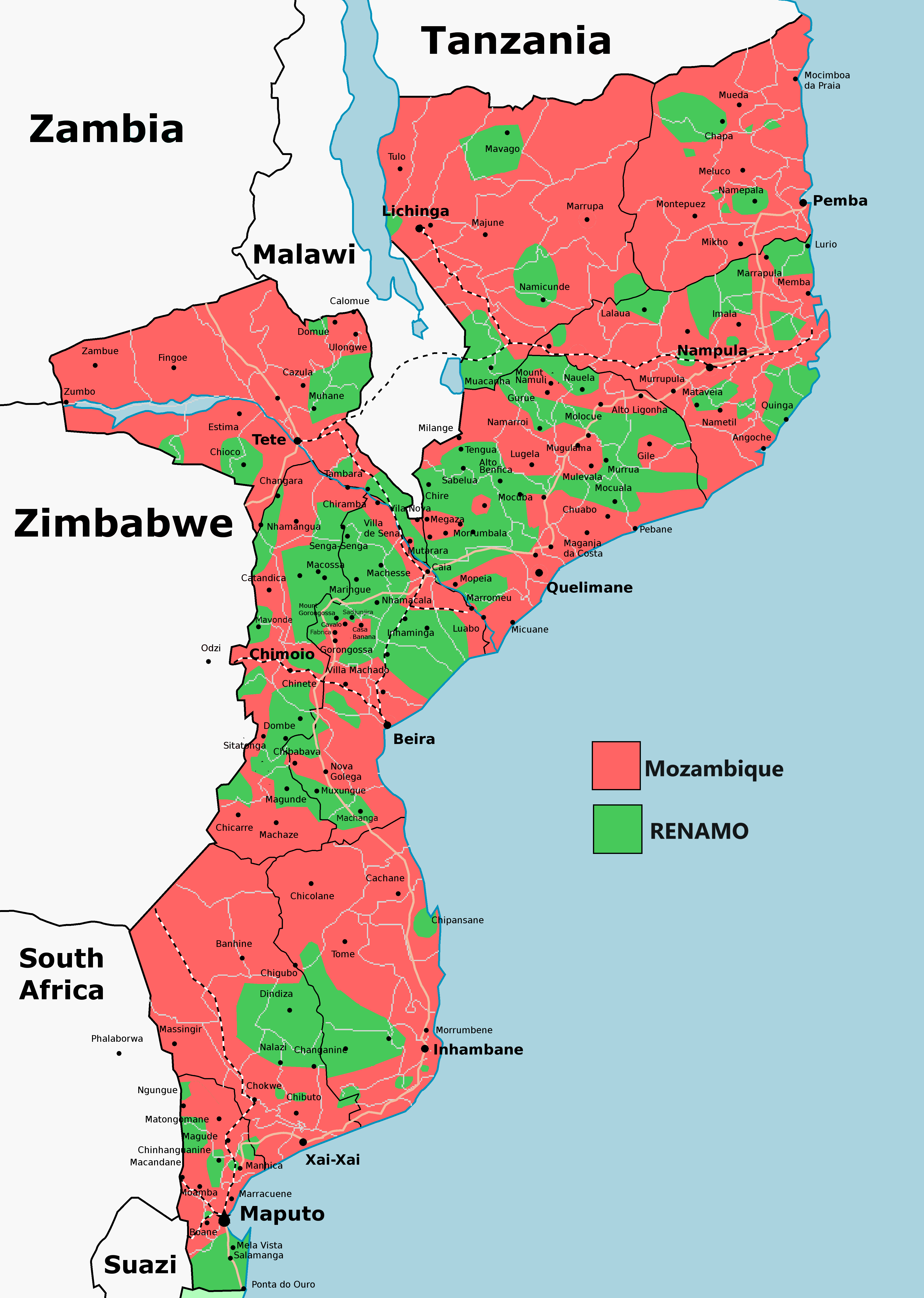
- RENAMO-held areas in the early 1990s
Date	30 May 1977 – 4 October 1992 (15 years, 4 months, 4 days)
Location	Mozambique
Result	See aftermath

Belligerents
Mozambique (People's Republic until 1990): FRELIMO; Naparama; ZANU (until 1979); Zimbabwe (from 1980); Tanzania; Malawi (from 1987); Soviet Union	RENAMO; PRM (until 1982); COREMO; UNAMO (1990-1992) (Note: UNAMO was founded in 1987 as a splinter of RENAMO, arguing that RENAMO had become a tribal vehicle for the Ndau, and that UNAMO would be the defenders of the Sena. UNAMO would fight both FRELIMO and RENAMO until reconciling with RENAMO in 1990.); UNIPOMO; FUMO; Supported by: Rhodesia (until 1979) South Africa (from 1978)	UNAMO (1987-1990); Supported by Malawi (1987-1992) (Note: UNAMO's main sponsor, they would continue to support them post-reconciliation even allowing them to operate in Malawi, despite openly sending troops to aid FRELIMO.)

Commanders and leaders
(Mozambique) Samora Machel † (Mozambique) Joaquim Chissano (Zimbabwe) Robert Mugabe (Tanzania) Julius Nyerere (Malawi) Hastings Banda; Manuel António	André Matsangaissa † (RENAMO); Afonso Dhlakama (RENAMO); Amos Sumane (executed) (PRM); Gimo Phiri (PRM, RENAMO, UNAMO)	Gimo Phiri; Carlos Reis

Strength
(Mozambique) 123,000 (Zimbabwe) 20,000 (Tanzania) 6,000 (Soviet Union) 4,000 (Socialist Republic of Romania) 500	~20,000	

Casualties and losses
(Mozambique) Unknown (Zimbabwe) 296 soldiers and 24 pilots killed (1984–1990) (Tanzania) 99 soldiers killed (Malawi) 100+ killed (Soviet Union) 8 killed (official data)	Unknown	
- Total killed: 1,000,000+ (Note: including from famine, with as many as 100,000 killed by RENAMO according to Mahmood Mamdani)

The Mozambican Civil War (Portuguese: Guerra Civil Moçambicana) was a civil war fought in Mozambique from 1977 to 1992 due to a combination of local strife and the polarizing effects of Cold War politics. The fighting was between Mozambique's ruling Marxist Front for the Liberation of Mozambique (FRELIMO), the anti-communist insurgent forces of the Mozambican National Resistance (RENAMO), (Note: Until 1979, Rhodesia was the main foreign backer of RENAMO, afterwards South Africa became their main backer. After Rhodesia became Zimbabwe following internationally recognised independence in 1980, Zimbabwe supported FRELIMO.) and a number of smaller factions such as the PRM, UNAMO, COREMO, UNIPOMO, and FUMO.

RENAMO opposed FRELIMO's attempts to establish a socialist one-party state, and was heavily backed by the anti-communist governments of Rhodesia and South Africa who supported them in order to undermine FRELIMO's support for militant nationalist organisations in their own countries. Over one million Mozambicans were killed in the fighting or starved due to interruptions to food supply; an additional five million were displaced across the region. The Mozambican Civil War destroyed much of Mozambique's critical infrastructure in rural areas, including hospitals, rail lines, roads, and schools. FRELIMO's security forces and RENAMO insurgents were accused of committing numerous human rights abuses, including the use of child soldiers and indiscriminately salting a significant percentage of the countryside with land mines. Three neighboring states—Zimbabwe, Tanzania, and Malawi—eventually deployed troops into Mozambique to defend their own vested economic interests against RENAMO attacks.

The Mozambican Civil War ended in 1992, following the collapse of support from the Soviet Union and South Africa for FRELIMO and RENAMO, respectively. Direct peace talks began around 1990 with the mediation of the Mozambican Church Council and the Italian government; these culminated in the Rome General Peace Accords which formally ended hostilities. As a result of the Rome General Peace Accords, RENAMO units were demobilised or integrated into the Mozambican armed forces and the United Nations Operation in Mozambique (ONUMOZ) was formed to aid in postwar reconstruction. Tensions between RENAMO and FRELIMO flared again between 2013 and 2018, prompting the former to resume its insurgency. This smaller second conflict ended with a peace treaty in 2019.

== Background ==
=== Independence ===
Portugal fought a long and bitter counter-insurgency conflict in its three primary African colonies—Angola, Mozambique, and Guinea-Bissau—from the 1960s to the mid-1970s, when they finally received independence following the Carnation Revolution. In Mozambique, the armed struggle against colonial rule was spearheaded by the Front for the Liberation of Mozambique (FRELIMO), which was initially formed in exile but later succeeded in wresting control of large sections of the country from the Portuguese. FRELIMO drew its initial base of support primarily from Mozambican migrant workers and expatriate intellectuals who had been exposed to the emerging popularity of anti-colonial and nationalist causes overseas, as well as the Makonde and other ethnic groups in northern Mozambique, where Portuguese influence was weakest. The bulk of its members were drawn from Makonde workers who had witnessed pro-independence rallies in British-ruled Tanganyika. In September 1964, FRELIMO commenced an armed insurgency against the Portuguese. Its decision to take up arms was influenced by a number of internal and external factors, namely the recent successes of indigenous anti-colonial guerrilla movements in French Indochina and French Algeria, as well as encouragement from contemporary African statesmen such as Ahmed Ben Bella, Gamal Abdel Nasser, and Julius Nyerere. FRELIMO guerrillas initially received training primarily in North Africa and the Middle East in countries such as Algeria, with the Soviet Union and People's Republic of China providing military equipment.

Portugal responded by embarking on a massive buildup of military personnel and security forces in Mozambique. It also established close defence ties with two of Mozambique's neighbours, Rhodesia and South Africa. In 1970, the Portuguese launched Operation Gordian Knot, which was initially successful at eliminating large numbers of FRELIMO guerrillas and their support bases in the north of the country; however, the redeployment of so many Portuguese troops to northern Mozambique allowed FRELIMO to intensify its operations elsewhere in the country. The following year, Portugal established an informal military alliance with Rhodesia and South Africa known as the Alcora Exercise. Representatives from the defence establishments of the three countries agreed to meet periodically to share intelligence and coordinate operations against militant nationalist movements in their respective countries. Simultaneously, FRELIMO also pursued close relations with the latter; for example, by 1971 it had cultivated an alliance with the Zimbabwe African National Liberation Army (ZANLA). ZANLA insurgents were permitted to infiltrate Rhodesia from FRELIMO-held territory. During the late 1960s, the Azanian People's Liberation Army (APLA) also took advantage of the gradual disintegration of Portuguese military control in Mozambique to begin infiltrating South Africa from that territory.

In April 1974, Portugal's longstanding Estado Novo political order was dismantled as a result of the Carnation Revolution. The revolution also brought to power a military junta known as the Armed Forces Movement, which was committed to divesting itself of the colonies and ending the increasingly costly African wars. The turmoil in the metropole was mirrored by increasing instability in Mozambique and a further weakening of Portugal's grip on its East African colony. Various new political parties were formed in Mozambique, including several by FRELIMO splinter factions, during the following months in anticipation of multi-party elections. However, FRELIMO insisted on being recognised as the sole legitimate representative of the new Mozambican nation. It rejected proposals for multi-party elections and took advantage of the chaos in the Portuguese military establishment to intensify its guerrilla campaign. In early September 1974, Portugal announced it was acceding to FRELIMO's request. No elections were going to be held in Mozambique; instead, after a nine-month transition period, the positions of local government would simply be handed to FRELIMO officials.

The Portuguese decision to effect a transfer to power to FRELIMO, without a local referendum or elections, was greeted with intense trepidation by Portugal's traditional Cold War allies: South Africa, Rhodesia, and the United States. The US government predicted that an independent Mozambique under the direction of FRELIMO would be heavily influenced by the Soviet bloc. Black opposition movements in South Africa declared that they would bring FRELIMO officials to address rallies being held near Durban, Johannesburg, and at the University of Northern Transvaal. The South African authorities banned the demonstrations, but activists proceeded anyway in defiance of the police. By the end of the year, sixty people had been arrested for organising pro-FRELIMO rallies.

In Mozambique, the announcement sparked an uprising by right-wing elements in the white population, joined by disgruntled veterans of the colonial army and some black Mozambicans outraged by FRELIMO's pending unilateral assumption of power. The rebels appealed to South Africa and Rhodesia for military assistance to preempt the installation of a FRELIMO government. However, South African prime minister B. J. Vorster was unwilling to intervene, fearing condemnation from the international community for any interference with the decolonisation process in a neighbouring country. Rhodesian prime minister Ian Smith was more sympathetic to the rebels' cause but felt that he would be unable to act without the guarantee of South African support. The uprising was eventually crushed after four days by an unlikely coalition of Portuguese and FRELIMO forces.

On 25 June 1975 Mozambique formally gained independence from Portugal, with FRELIMO Leader Samora Machel becoming President of the People's Republic of Mozambique.

=== Geo-political situation ===
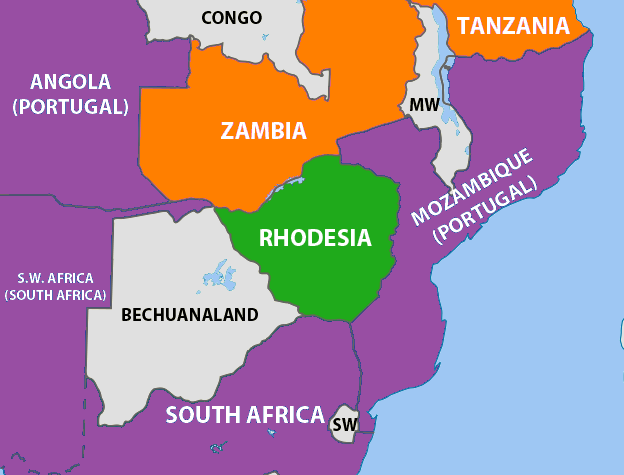
The geopolitical situation of Rhodesia in 1965. Rhodesia is coloured green and countries friendly to the government (South Africa and Portugal) are shown in purple.

The geopolitical situation of Rhodesia after the independence of Angola and Mozambique in 1975. Rhodesia itself is shown in green, nations friendly to the nationalist guerrillas are shown in orange, and South Africa and its dependency South-West Africa (now Namibia) are coloured purple.

The independence of Mozambique and Angola in 1975 challenged white minority rule in Southern Africa. Firstly, the independence wars in Angola and Mozambique demonstrated that even with great military resources it was virtually impossible for a small white minority to guarantee the safety of its members, let alone to exert control over a mobilised and agitated population outside of major power centres. The downfall of Portuguese colonial rule gave hope to black liberation struggles in the then apartheid South Africa and Rhodesia. Second, in both countries revolutionary socialist movements gained power. These movements had been cooperating with the black liberation movements in South Africa and Rhodesia, and continued to openly support them, offering them a safe haven from where they could coordinate their operations and train new forces. As President Machel put it in a speech in 1975: "The struggle in Zimbabwe is our struggle."

The independence of Mozambique was especially devastating for white-ruled Rhodesia in multiple aspects. The Rhodesian armed forces lacked the manpower to effectively protect its 1,300-kilometre (800 mi) border with Mozambique against entering ZANLA insurgents. At the same time, the apartheid government and the Smith regime lost Portugal as an ally and with it the tens of thousands of soldiers that had been deployed in the Portuguese colonial wars. Additionally Rhodesia used Mozambican ports as their primary means for imports and exports, with over 80% of all imports passing through Maputo and Beira into the heavily sanctioned country. The loss of these ports after President Machel declared sanctions against the country further weakened the already fragile economy of Rhodesia and angered the Ian Smith regime.

Thus with the South African and Rhodesian white minority government position severely weakened by the events of 1974/75 both governments sought to undermine the newly independent countries and to shatter FRELIMO's goal of building the first, non-racial socialist state in Southern Africa. The countries' capacity to support national liberation movements also concerned South Africa and Rhodesia and both countries sought for a first strike strategy to counter this new threat. This manifested itself in the Rhodesia-sponsored foundation of RENAMO, then called the Mozambique National Resistance (MNR), in 1974 and in South Africa's adoption of the "Total National Strategy."

=== Internal Mozambican tensions ===
==== FRELIMO dissidents ====
Soon after independence, FRELIMO began Mozambique's transformation into a socialist one-party-state. This was accompanied by crackdowns on dissidents and the nationalisation of important economic facilities abandoned by fleeing Portuguese. Numerous political parties sprang up virtually overnight and vied for power with FRELIMO. Many of these parties like COREMO and UNAR were made up of FRELIMO dissidents such as Uria Simango and Lazaro Nkavandame. Both men were arrested and convicted in a public trial before Samora Machel before and sent to re-education camps. Simango was reportedly later extrajudicially executed whilst Nkavandame reportedly died of natural causes.

Furthermore, the nationalisation of many formerly Portuguese-owned enterprises, fear of a retaliation against whites, and an ultimatum to either accept Mozambican citizenship or leave the country within 90 days, drove the majority of the 370,000 white Portuguese Mozambicans out of the country. As the Portuguese left some purposefully sabotaged the economy, stealing profits from factories, driving tractors into the sea and pouring cement into sewers. The Portuguese exodus resulted in economic chaos as only a few Africans had received higher education or even primary education under Portuguese rule with over 95% of the population illiterate.

==== Overturning of traditional hierarchies and re-education camps ====
As a revolutionary Marxist party, FRELIMO embarked on overturning traditional, tribal governance structures that grew extensively under the Portuguese colonial rule in an effort to counter regionalism and tribalism to build a single, national identity. Shortly after independence many local chiefs were ousted and removed from positions of power and many dissidents were imprisoned in re-education camps. Another source of conflict was the continuation of the aldeamento system that the Portuguese had introduced as a means of exerting control and inhibiting contact between the population and the rebels. It coerced thousands of peasants to move into communal villages and communal farms where they were given food, water and healthcare, but lacked adequate tools and money to farm effectively. FRELIMO hoped that this system would enable the fulfilment of its ambitious agricultural development goals, but the implementation often alienated parts of the rural population, whom FRELIMO had popular support from during the independence struggle. This was especially the case in central and northern Mozambique, where households are traditionally separated by considerable distances.

== Course of the war ==
=== Outbreak ===
From 1975 to 1979, Rhodesian troops and forces repeatedly entered into Mozambique in order to carry out operations against supposed ZANLA (Zimbabwe African National Liberation Army) bases tolerated on Mozambican territory by the FRELIMO government and to destabilise the FRELIMO government directly. These included the bombing of the Beira Port in 1979 and the occupation of the town of Mapai in 1977.

During one such raid, Rhodesian forces freed FRELIMO ex-official André Matsangaissa from a re-education camp. He was given military and organisational training and installed as the leader of the fledgling movement known as the Mozambique Resistance, which had been founded by the Rhodesian secret service before the independence of Mozambique in 1975 as an intelligence gathering group on FRELIMO and ZANLA. It was created in Salisbury, Rhodesia under the auspices of Ken Flower, head of the Rhodesian CIO, and Orlando Cristina, a former anti-guerrilla operative for the Portuguese.

RENAMO subsequently started operating in the Gorongosa region in order to destabilise the FRELIMO government and its support for the ZANLA movement against Rhodesia. RENAMO was composed of several anti-communist dissident groups which appeared immediately prior to, and shortly following, Mozambican independence. RENAMO's ranks included a number of Mozambican political exiles opposed FRELIMO on principle, including FRELIMO defectors disillusioned with its Marxist–Leninist ideology.

In 1979, Matsangaissa died in RENAMO's unsuccessful first attack on a major regional centre (Vila Paiva) and RENAMO was quickly ousted from the region. Subsequently, Afonso Dhlakama became the new leader of RENAMO and with extensive South African support it quickly organised itself into an effective guerrilla army.

Other rebel groups, initially independent of RENAMO, also fought the FRELIMO government. The Revolutionary Party of Mozambique (PRM), founded by Amos Sumane in 1974 or 1976, waged a low-level insurgency in the northern provinces of Zambezia, Tete and Niassa from 1977. Sumane was captured in 1980 and executed by the Mozambican government in 1981. PRM merged with RENAMO in 1982. In 1987, Gimo Phiri, who had succeeded Sumane in 1980 and later become a senior figure in RENAMO, created a splinter group, called UNAMO, which briefly fought both RENAMO and FRELIMO, before permanently joining the government side in 1988. Other rebel factions during the conflict included COREMO, UNIPOMO, and FUMO.

=== RENAMO strategies and operations ===
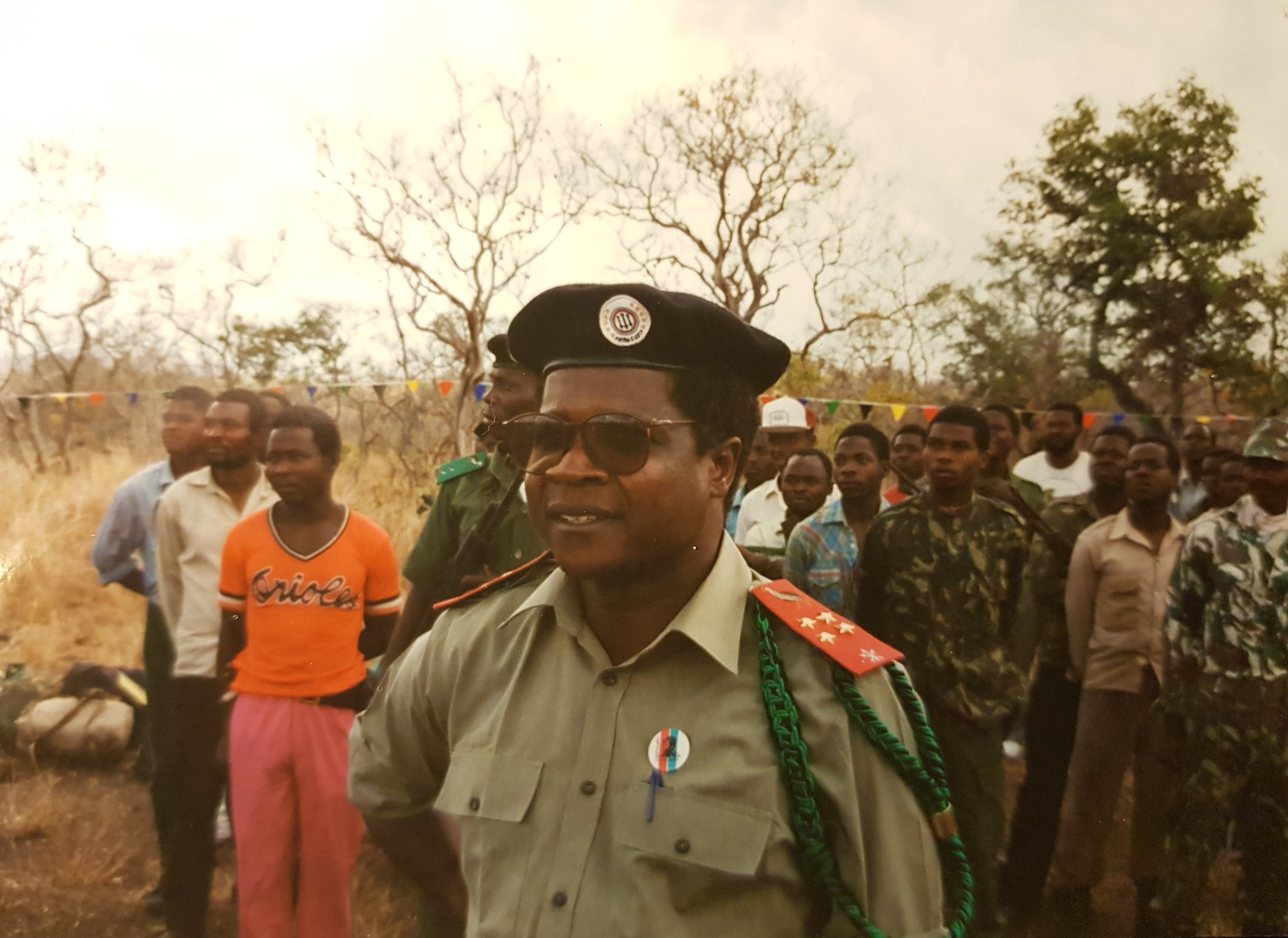
Afonso Dhlakama (center), leader of RENAMO from 1979

Having fought the Portuguese using guerrilla strategies, FRELIMO was now forced to defend itself against the very same methods it employed against the colonial regime. It had to defend vast areas and hundreds of locations, while RENAMO operated out of a few remote camps, carrying out raids against towns and important infrastructure. Furthermore, RENAMO systematically forced civilians into its employment, which was done by mass abduction and intimidation, especially of children in order to use them as soldiers. It is estimated that one-third of RENAMO forces were child soldiers. Abducted people also had to serve RENAMO in administrative or public service functions in the areas it controlled. Another way of using civilians for military purposes was the so-called system of "Gandira." This system especially affected the rural population in areas controlled by RENAMO, forcing them to fulfill three main tasks: 1) produce food for RENAMO, 2) transport goods and ammunition, 3) in the case of women, serve as sex slaves. RENAMO's stated goal was to free Mozambique from "Machelist Communism." RENAMO's political programme centered around the abandonment of FRELIMO's socialist policies, the adoption of a free market economy, and more traditionalist concerns such as the reinstatement of tribal leaders to positions of authority.

Thus, despite its far superior numbers, FRELIMO was unable to adequately defend most regions except the most important cities by the mid-1980s. RENAMO was able to carry out raids virtually anywhere in the country except for the major cities. Transportation had become a perilous business. Even armed convoys were not safe from RENAMO attacks and were frequently attacked.

=== FRELIMO strategies and operations ===
FRELIMO reacted by reusing a system similar to the fortified villages aldeamentos introduced by the Portuguese: the creation of fortified communal villages called aldeamentos comunais where much of the rural population was relocated as the war intensified. Furthermore, in order to keep a minimum level of infrastructure working, three heavily guarded and mined corridors were established consisting of roads, railways and power lines: the Beira, the Tete (also called the Tete Run which speaks for itself regarding its safety) and the Limpopo Corridor. Despite extensive fortification along these corridors they were frequently subject to attacks, bombings of the railway line and locomotives along the Beira Corridor cost the FRELIMO government millions as it struggled to provide adequate food and services and put strains on its ally Zimbabwe.

=== Foreign support and intervention ===
FRELIMO initially received substantial military and development aid from the Soviet Union and East Germany but later received support from France, the UK and the U.S. In the U.S., conservative circles lobbied for the U.S Government to provide open support to RENAMO but were opposed by the State Department, which finally gained the upper hand following the publication of numerous, detailed reports which documented RENAMO's brutality. RENAMO received extensive military and logistical support from Rhodesia and South Africa as well as organisational support from West Germany.

In 1982, landlocked Zimbabwe directly intervened in the civil war in order to secure its vital transport routes in Mozambique, stop cross-border RENAMO raids, and help its old ally FRELIMO. Zimbabwe's help became crucial to the defence of the corridors, particularly the important Beira corridor. Later Zimbabwe became engaged further, carrying out several joint operations with FRELIMO against RENAMO strongholds including the capture of RENAMO's base camps in the Gorongosa area. Tanzania also sent troops to back FRELIMO. North Korea, East Germany and the Soviet Union also armed and trained FRELIMO forces, with the North Koreans establishing a Military Mission in Mozambique during the early 1980s North Korean advisers were instrumental in the formation of FRELIMO's first specialized counter-insurgency brigade, which was deployed from 1983 onward. East Germany provided military assistance and trained members of the Mozambican FPLM in East Germany. In the spring of 1977, the Romanian Socialist Army sent 500 soldiers and officers to Mozambique. The Romanians were deployed to Maputo and Nacala. Specialized in operating tanks, these Romanian troops - under the supervision of some Soviet officers - trained Mozambican tank troops in the use of T-34 and T-54 tanks.

Malawi had a complicated relationship with both FRELIMO and RENAMO. During the mid-1980s, FRELIMO repeatedly accused Malawian president Hastings Banda of providing sanctuary to RENAMO insurgents. Mozambican security forces occasionally carried out raids into Malawi to strike at suspected RENAMO bases, a practice which brought them into direct conflict with the Malawian Defence Force. In 1986, Malawi, under Mozambican pressure, expelled 12,000 RENAMO insurgents. Banda explicitly turned against RENAMO after disgruntled RENAMO insurgents began targeting a vital rail line which linked Blantyre to Mozambican ports on the Indian Ocean. Beginning in April 1987 the Malawian government deployed troops into Mozambique to defend the rail line, where they became involved in a number of military engagements with RENAMO.

After 1980, South Africa became RENAMO's main supporter. The FRELIMO government, led by President Machel, was economically devastated by the war and sought to end the conflict and continue the development of Mozambique. Even the military and diplomatic support with the socialist bloc could not alleviate the nation's economic misery and famine as a result of the war. After negotiations, a reluctant Machel signed a non-aggression pact with South Africa, known as the Nkomati Accord. In return, Pretoria promised to stop assistance to RENAMO in exchange for FRELIMO's commitment to prevent the ANC from using Mozambique as a sanctuary to pursue its campaign to end white minority rule in South Africa. Following a May 1983 car bombing in Pretoria by the ANC, South Africa bombed the capital, declaring they had killed 41 ANC members. With the economy in shambles, Machel was forced to scale back some of his more ambitious socialist policies; in a visit to Western Europe that same month, Machel signed military and economic agreements with Portugal, France, and the UK. Collective and state agricultural programs were also scaled back, prompting concerns from the socialist bloc that Mozambique was moving towards capitalism. The volume of South African government support for RENAMO reduced after Nkomati Accord, but documents discovered during the capture of RENAMO headquarters at Gorongosa in central Mozambique in August 1985 revealed that South Africa had continued and extended its already extensive logistical, communication and military support for RENAMO. FRELIMO, meanwhile, honoured its side of the deal to expel militant ANC members from its territory and to downgrade the ANC's presence in the south of the country.

The United States was not involved in the conflict.

=== Military stalemate ===
By the end of the 1980s RENAMO, whilst incapable of capturing or securing any large cities, was still able to move freely in rural areas and attack smaller settlements. FRELIMO retained control of larger urban areas and the corridors, but was unable to effectively protect the countryside from RENAMO attacks. FRELIMO was also unable to pin down RENAMO and force it into more direct conventional warfare.

On 19 October 1986, President Machel died after his presidential aircraft crashed near South Africa's border under disputed circumstances. A South African sponsored investigation concluded that the crash was caused by errors made by the flight crew, a conclusion that was not universally accepted. Subsequent investigations have failed to reach a conclusion and the accident remains surrounded by conspiracy theories claiming that South Africa was responsible for the crash. Machel's successor was Joaquim Alberto Chissano, who had served as foreign minister from 1975 until Machel's death. Chissano continued Machel's policies of expanding Mozambique's international ties, particularly the country's links with the West, and enacted economic and military reforms.

During the war, hundreds of thousands of people died from famine, particularly during the devastating famine of 1984. The famine, caused by adverse weather conditions, was significantly worsened by the conflict between RENAMO and FRELIMO.

== War crimes ==
The Mozambican civil war saw war crimes committed by both sides on a massive scale and in an organised manner. No RENAMO or FRELIMO commanders have ever been prosecuted for war crimes due to an unconditional general amnesty law for the period from 1976 to 1992 passed by the Mozambican parliament (then still composed entirely of FRELIMO members) in 1992.

=== RENAMO ===
RENAMO systematically committed atrocities as part of its war and destabilization strategies. These included massacres, rapes and mutilation of civilians during attacks on villages and towns, the use of child soldiers and the employment of the Gandira system, which involved forced labour and sexual violence. Women would often be abducted while working in the fields and then raped as a means to boost troop morale. The Gandira system also contributed to famine, as the rural population was made to produce food for RENAMO and therefore unable to produce food for themselves. Others were made to transport supplies for RENAMO in long marches. Refusing to participate in Gandira or falling behind on the marches would result in severe beating or even execution. Attempting to escape was also punished harshly. One particularly gruesome practice was the mutilation or killing of children who were left behind by escaped parents. RENAMO's brutal tactics earned them a negative reputation among much of the country's population who referred to them as "Armed Bandits" and supported punishments such as beatings or even executions against RENAMO. In one instance public pressure led the military to publicly execute four captured RENAMO rebels in 1983.

RENAMO's atrocities gained worldwide attention in July 1987, following the Homoine massacre of 424 civilians during a raid on the rural town, which was lightly defended by 90 FRELIMO soldiers. The victims included hospital patients. This incident prompted an investigation into RENAMO's tactics by the United States Department of State which commissioned a report by consultant Robert Gersony. The Gersony Report's conclusions put an end to ambitions from some conservative politicians for the US government to start supporting RENAMO. The report concluded that RENAMO's attack on Homoine did not significantly differ from the tactics it normally employed in raids on settlements. The report described RENAMO's methods in the following way:

The attack stage was sometimes reported to begin with what appeared to the inhabitants to be the indiscriminate firing of automatic weapons by a substantial force of attacking RENAMO combatants. [...] Reportedly the Government soldiers aim their defensive fire at the attackers, while the RENAMO forces shoot indiscriminately into the village. In some cases refugees perceived that the attacking force had divided into three detachments: one conducts the military attack; another enters houses and removes valuables, mainly clothing, radios, food, pots and other possessions; a third moves through the looted houses with pieces of burning thatch setting fire to the houses in the village. There were several reports that schools and health clinics are typical targets for destruction. The destruction of the village as a viable entity appears to be the main objective of such attacks. This type of attack causes several types of civilian casualties. As is normal in guerrilla warfare, some civilians are killed in crossfire between the two opposing forces, although this tends in the view of the refugees to account for only a minority of the deaths. A larger number of civilians in these attacks and other contexts were reported to be victims of purposeful shooting deaths and executions, of axing, knifing, bayoneting, burning to death, forced drowning and asphyxiation, and other forms of murder where no meaningful resistance or defense is present. Eyewitness accounts indicate that when civilians are killed in these indiscriminate attacks, whether against defended or undefended villages, children, often together with mothers and elderly people, are also killed. Varying numbers of civilian victims in each attack were reported to be rounded up and abducted [...].

According to the Gersony Report, RENAMO's abuses were far more systematic, widespread and serious than FRELIMO's: the refugees interviewed for the Gersony Report attributed 94% of murders, 94% of abductions and 93% of lootings to RENAMO. Political commentator Mahmood Mamdani estimates that as many as 100,000 people were killed by RENAMO during the war, citing the Gersony Report that estimated that up to 95% of instances of abuse of civilians were committed by RENAMO. However, this conclusion has been disputed by the French Marxist scholar Michel Cahen, who states that both sides were equally to blame:

There can be no doubt that the war was largely one fought against civilians... I am also convinced that the war was equally savage on both sides, even if the total domination of the media by FRELIMO for the 15 years of the war has led even those most desirous of remaining objective to attribute the majority of the atrocities to RENAMO. The people themselves were not duped: they attributed various acts of banditry and certain massacres to "RENAMO 1," but others to "RENAMO 2" – the euphemistic term for FRELIMO soldiers and militiamen acting on their own.

=== FRELIMO ===
FRELIMO soldiers also committed serious war crimes during the civil war. FRELIMO forced people into its employment and conscription periods often extended beyond what the law allowed. Living in the communal villages became mandatory in certain provinces. However, in some areas, cultural norms required households to live at some distance apart from each other. Therefore, many people preferred living in the countryside despite the risk of RENAMO attacks. Thus people would often be forced into the communal villages at gunpoint by FRELIMO soldiers or their Zimbabwean allies. As a local recalls:

I never wanted to leave my old residence and come to the communal village. Even with the war, I wanted to stay where I had my land and granaries. Ever since a long time ago, we never lived with so many people together in the same place. Everyone must live in his own yard. The Komeredes [Zimbabwean soldiers] came to my house and said that I should leave my house and go to the communal village where there were a lot of people. I tried to refuse and then they set fire to my house, my granaries, and my fields. They threatened me with death and they told me and my family to go forward. Inside the communal village we lived like pigs. It was like a yard for pigs. We were so many people living close to each other. If someone slept with his wife everyone could listen to what they were doing. When we went to the fields or to the cemeteries to bury the dead, the soldiers had to come behind and in front of us. When the women went to the river to wash themselves, the soldiers had to go too and they usually saw our women naked. Everything was a complete shame inside that corral. Usually to eat, we had to depend on humanitarian aid, but we never knew when it would arrive. It was terrible; that is why many people used to run away from the communal village to their old residences where RENAMO soldiers were, although it was also terrible there.

Rape also became a widespread practice of FRELIMO soldiers. However, it was far less frequent and lacked the systematic nature of sexual violence perpetrated by RENAMO.

As part of a series of measures following independence, FRELIMO introduced "re-education camps" to which petty criminals, political opponents, and alleged anti-social elements such as prostitutes were sent, oftentimes without trial due to a lack of judges. In 1980, President Machel visited numerous camps and ordered the release of about 2,000 detainees and closure of numerous camps, citing human rights abuses. These were later described by foreign observers as "infamous centers of torture and death." It is estimated that 30,000 inmates died in these camps. The government was also accused of executing thousands of people while trying to extend its control throughout the country.

== Aftermath ==
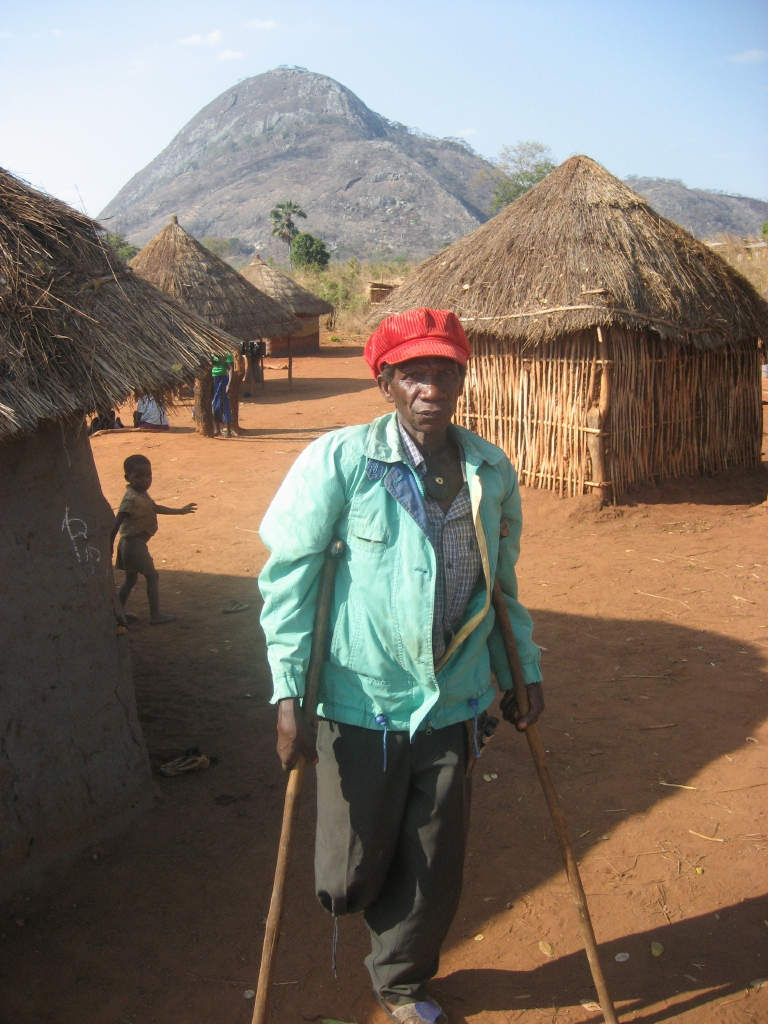
Mozambican victim of land mines set up during the war

=== Transition to peace ===
In 1990, with the Cold War in its closing days, apartheid crumbling in South Africa, and support for RENAMO drying up in South Africa, the first direct talks between the FRELIMO government and RENAMO were held. FRELIMO's new draft constitution in July 1989 paved the way for a multiparty system, and a new constitution was adopted in November 1990. Mozambique was now a multiparty state, with periodic elections, and guaranteed democratic rights.

On 4 October 1992, the Rome General Peace Accords, negotiated by the Community of Sant'Egidio with the support of the United Nations, were signed in Rome between President Chissano and RENAMO leader Afonso Dhlakama, which formally took effect on 15 October 1992. A UN peacekeeping force (UNOMOZ) of 7,500 arrived in Mozambique and oversaw a two-year transition to democracy. 2,400 international observers also entered the country to supervise the elections held on 27–28 October 1994. The last UNOMOZ contingents departed in early 1995. By then out of a total population of 13-15 million at the time, the Mozambican civil war had caused about one million deaths, displaced 5.7 million internally and resulted with 1.7 million refugees.

=== Landmines ===
HALO Trust, a de-mining group funded by the US and UK, began operating in Mozambique in 1993, recruiting local workers to remove land mines scattered throughout the country. Four HALO workers were killed in the subsequent effort to rid Mozambique of land mines, which continued to cause as many as several hundred civilian injuries and fatalities annually for years after the war. In September 2015, the country was finally declared to be free of land mines, with the last known device intentionally detonated as part of a ceremony.

=== Resurgence of violence since 2013 ===
In mid-2013, after more than twenty years of peace, the RENAMO insurgency was renewed, mainly in the central and northern regions of the country. On 5 September 2014, former president Armando Guebuza and the leader of RENAMO Afonso Dhlakama signed the Accord on Cessation of Hostilities, which brought the military hostilities to a halt and allowed both parties to concentrate on the general elections to be held in October 2014. Yet, following the general elections, a new political crisis emerged and the country appears to be once again on the brink of violent conflict. RENAMO does not recognise the validity of the election results, and demands the control of six provinces – Nampula, Niassa, Tete, Zambezia, Sofala, and Manica – where they claim to have won a majority.

On 20 January 2016, the Secretary General of RENAMO, Manuel Bissopo, was injured in a shootout, where his bodyguard died. However, a joint commission for the political dialogue between the President of the Republic, Filipe Nyusi, and RENAMO leader, Afonso Dhlakama, was eventually set up and a working meeting was held. It was a closed-door meeting that scheduled the beginning of the previous points that would precede the meeting between the two leaders.

== Bibliography ==
- Abrahamsson, Hans; Nilsson, Anders (1995). Mozambique, the troubled transition: from socialist construction to free market capitalism. London; Atlantic Highlands, N.J: Zed Books. ISBN 978-1-85649-323-9.
- Andersson, Hilary (1992). Mozambique: a war against the people. New York: St. Martin's Press. ISBN 978-0-312-08406-6.
- Banks, Arthur S.; Muller, Thomas C., eds. (1998). Political Handbook of the World: 1998: Governments and Intergovernmental Organizations as of January 1, 1998. London: Palgrave Macmillan UK. doi:10.1007/978-1-349-14951-3. ISBN 978-1-349-14953-7.
- Cabrita, João M. (2000). Mozambique: the tortuous road to democracy. Basingstoke, Hampshire: Palgrave Macmillan. ISBN 978-0-333-97738-5.
- Cahen, M. (1998). "'Dhlakama É Maningue Nice!': An Atypical Former Guerrilla in the Mozambican Electoral Campaign". Transformation. 35: 1–48.
- Emerson, Stephen A. (2014). The battle for Mozambique: the Frelimo-Renamo struggle, 1977-1992. West Midlands: Helion. ISBN 978-1-909384-92-7.
- Gersony, Robert (April 1988). Summary of Mozambican refugee accounts of principally conflict-related experience in Mozambique (Report) (in Portuguese). Washington, D.C.: Bureau for Refugee Programs, U.S. Department of State.
- Igreja, Victor (2007). The Monkeys' Sworn Oath: Cultures of Engagement for Reconciliation and Healing in the Aftermath of the Civil War in Mozambique (PhD thesis). Leiden University.
- Juergensen, Olaf Tataryn (December 1994). "Angonia: Why RENAMO?". Southern Africa Report. 10 (2): 13. Archived from the original on 8 October 2006.
- Lohman, Major Charles M.; MacPherson, Major Robert I. (7 June 1983). Rhodesia: Tactical Victory, Strategic Defeat (PDF). War Since 1945 Seminar and Symposium. Quantico, Virginia: Marine Corps Command and Staff College. pp. 1–63.
- Lulat, Y. G.-M. (2008). United States relations with South Africa: a critical overview from the colonial period to the present. New York: P. Lang. ISBN 978-0-8204-7907-1.
- Morier-Genoud, Éric; Cahen, Michel; Rosário, Domingos M. do, eds. (2018). The War Within: New Perspectives on the Civil War in Mozambique 1976-1992. Woodbridge: James Currey. ISBN 978-1-84701-180-0.
- Seegers, Annette (2018) [1st pub. 1986]. "From Liberation to Modernization: Transforming Revolutionary Paramilitary Forces into Standing Professional Armies". In Arlinghaus, Bruce E.; Baker, Pauline H. (eds.). African Armies: Evolution And Capabilities. Abingdon-on-Thames: Routledge. pp. 52–83. ISBN 978-0-429-72578-4.
- Turner, John W. (1998). Continent Ablaze: The Insurgency Wars in Africa, 1960 to the Present. London: Arms and Armor Press. ISBN 9781854091284.
- Young, Major Lance S. (1991). "Mozambique's Sixteen-Year Bloody Civil War". GlobalSecurity.org.
- Fauvet, Paul; Mosse, Marcelo (2003). Carlos Cardoso: telling the truth in Mozambique. Cape Town: Double Storey. ISBN 978-1-919930-31-2.
- Weigert, Stephen L. (1996). Traditional religion and guerrilla Warfare in modern Africa. New York: St. Martin's Press. ISBN 978-0-312-12715-2.
