= Mozambique Defence Armed Forces =

National armed forces of Mozambique

- Forças Armadas de Defesa de Moçambique (Portuguese)
- Flag of the Armed Forces
- Founded: 1975
- Current form: August 1994
- Service branches: Mozambican Army; Mozambique Naval Command; Mozambique Air Force; Mozambique Militia
- Headquarters: Ministry of National Defence, Avenida Martires de Mueda, Maputo
- Website: mdn.gov.mz/index.php/fadm

Leadership
- President: Daniel Chapo
- Prime Minister: Maria Benvinda Levy
- National Defence Minister: Cristovão Chume
- Chief of General Staff: Joaquim Mangrasse

Personnel
- Military age: 18
- Active personnel: ~11,200

Expenditure
- Budget: $245 million (2020 est.)
- Percent of GDP: 2.5% (2008 est.)

Industry
- Foreign suppliers: China; India; Portugal

Related articles
- History: Mozambican War of Independence; Mozambican Civil War; Rhodesian Bush War; Angolan Civil War; Uganda–Tanzania War; 1999 East Timorese crisis; RENAMO insurgency (2013–2019); Insurgency in Cabo Delgado
- Ranks: Military ranks of Mozambique

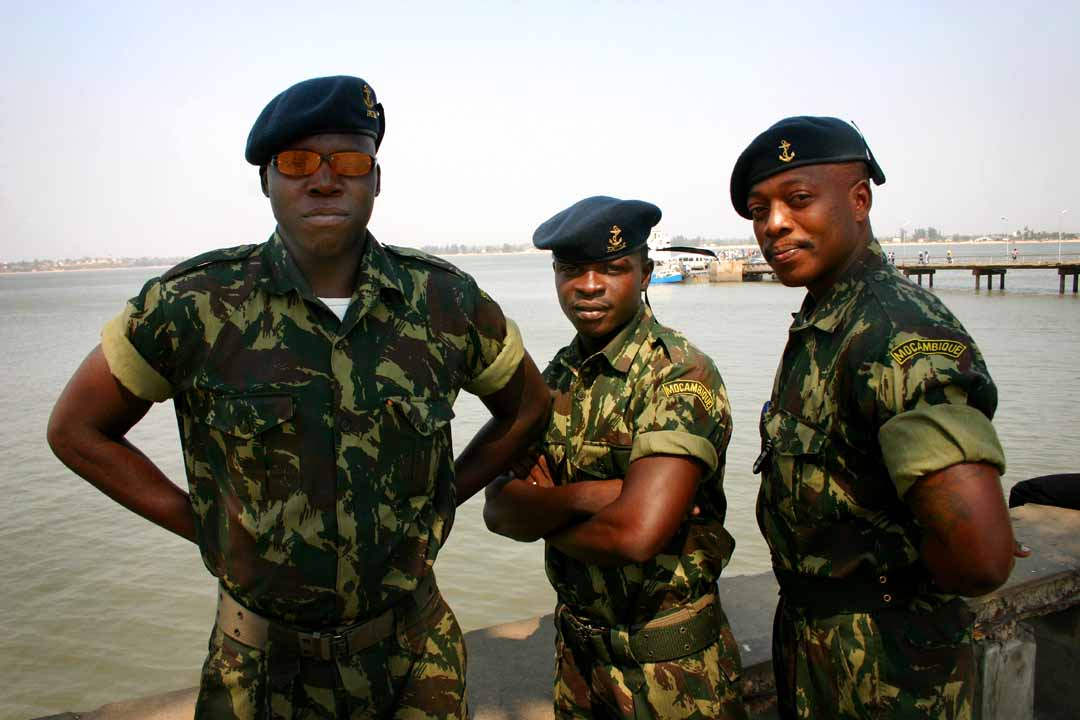
Mozambican soldiers

The Mozambique Defence Armed Forces (Portuguese: Forças Armadas de Defesa de Moçambique, FADM) are the national armed forces of Mozambique. They include the General Staff of the Armed Forces and three branches of service: Army, Air Force and Navy.

The FADM were formed in mid August 1994, by the integration of the Forças Armadas de Moçambique/FPLM with the military wing of RENAMO, following the end of the civil war.

== History ==
Coelho et al write: "Independence in June 1975 was preceded by a nine-month transition period in which Frelimo took control of a transitional cabinet where ..it held six of the nine ministries." The previous Forças Populares de Libertação de Moçambique (FPLM), the armed wing of FRELIMO, became the Forças Armadas de Moçambique but retained the FPLM title, becoming "FAM/FPLM". From 1975 to the successful conclusions of the Rome negotiations in 1992, former liberation war leader Alberto Joaquim Chipande served as Minister of National Defence. The same year, Sebastião Mabote was appointed as chief of the armed forces.

Under the previous FAM, in 1982, ten provincial semi-autonomous military commands were created; the provincial commanders also acted as second in commands of the provincial government. Coelho et al write:

"the 1st Brigade and the 6th Tank Brigade were located in Maputo; the 2nd Brigade was in Mapai and, together with 8th Brigade based in Chokwe, assured protection of the south; the 3rd Brigade was in Chimoio and the 5th in Beira; the 4th Brigade was placed in Tete, and the 7th in Cuamba, assuring a military presence in Niassa, Cabo Delgado, Zambezia and Nampula, and particularly in the Nacala corridor.."

Throughout the 1980s the FRELIMO government and its armed forces, the Forças Armadas de Moçambique/FPLM, fought the rebel Mozambican National Resistance (RENAMO), which received support by South Africa.

In June 1987, there was a senior military reshuffle. Colonel-General Sebastião Mabote, Chief of the General Staff, was replaced by previous Chief of the Air Force Lieutenant-General Antonio Hama Thai, who was also appointed Deputy Minister of Defence. Thai had distinguished himself in an offensive against Renamo in Zambézia. Major-General Tobías Dai was given a deputy position to Thai in the new position of Commander of the Armed Forces, while Manuel Gimo Caetano was promoted to Commander of the Navy; Major-General Domingos Dondo became Commander of the Frontier Guards; and Colonel João Bernado Honwana became Commander of the air force.

The Mozambican Civil War only ended in 1992. Robinson writes by early 1993 that:

In the meantime the break-down of discipline within the Mozambican armed forces was escalating, driven by desperation and sheer desire to end the war, to the extent that government soldiers were looting warehouses, hijacking food convoys and ambushing traffic throughout the country. In March members of the Presidential Guard even occupied their barracks and took their commander hostage.

The Mozambique Defence Armed Forces were formed in mid-August 1994 after peace negotiations in Rome had produced the General Peace Agreement (GPA, AGP in Portuguese). The new armed forces were formed by integrating those soldiers of the former government Forças Armadas de Moçambique/FPLM and those among the RENAMO rebels who wished to stay in uniform. They were formed through a commission, the Comissão Conjunta para a Formação das Forças Armadas de Defesa e Segurança de Moçambique (CCFADM), chaired by the United Nations Operation in Mozambique (ONUMOZ).

Two generals were appointed to lead the new forces, one from FRELIMO, Lieutenant General Lagos Lidimo, who was named Chief of the Defence Force and Major General Mateus Ngonhamo from RENAMO as Vice-Chief of the Defence Force. The former Chief of the Army of the Forças Armadas de Moçambique, Lieutenant General Antonio Hama Thai, was retired.

The first three infantry battalions were stationed at Chokwe, Cuamba, and Quelimane.

On 20 March 2008, Reuters reported that President Guebuza had dismissed the Chief and Vice Chief of the Defence Force, Lieutenant General Lagos Lidimo (FRELIMO) and Lieutenant General Mateus Ngonhamo (RENAMO), replacing them with Brigadier General Paulino Macaringue as Chief of Defence Force and Major General Olímpio Cambora as Vice-Chief of Defence Force.

Filipe Nyussi took office as Minister of Defense on 27 March 2008, succeeding Tobias Joaquim Dai. Nyussi's appointment came almost exactly one year after a fire and resulting explosions of munitions at the Malhazine armoury in Maputo killed more than 100 people and destroyed 14,000 homes. A government-appointed investigative commission concluded that negligence played a role in the disaster, and Dai "was blamed by many for failing to act on time to prevent the loss of life". Although no official reason was given for Dai's removal, it may have been a "delayed reaction" to the Malhazine disaster.

In April 2010 it was announced that "the People's Republic of China donated to the FADM material for agriculture worth 4 million euros, including trucks, tractors, agricultural implements, mowers and motorbikes in the framework of bilateral cooperation in the military. Under a protocol of cooperation in the military field, the Government of China will also provide support to the Ministry of Defence of Mozambique with about 1 million euros for the areas of training and logistics. The protocol for granting aid to the Armed Forces for the Defence of Mozambique (FADM) was signed by Defense Minister of Mozambique, Filipe Nyusi, and the charge d'affaires of the Chinese embassy in Maputo, Lee Tongli."

Mozambique has also been involved in many peacekeeping operations in Burundi (232 personnel), Comoros, Democratic Republic of the Congo, East Timor and Sudan. They have also actively participated in joint military operations such Blue Hungwe in Zimbabwe in 1997 and Blue Crane in South Africa in 1999.

== Land Forces ==
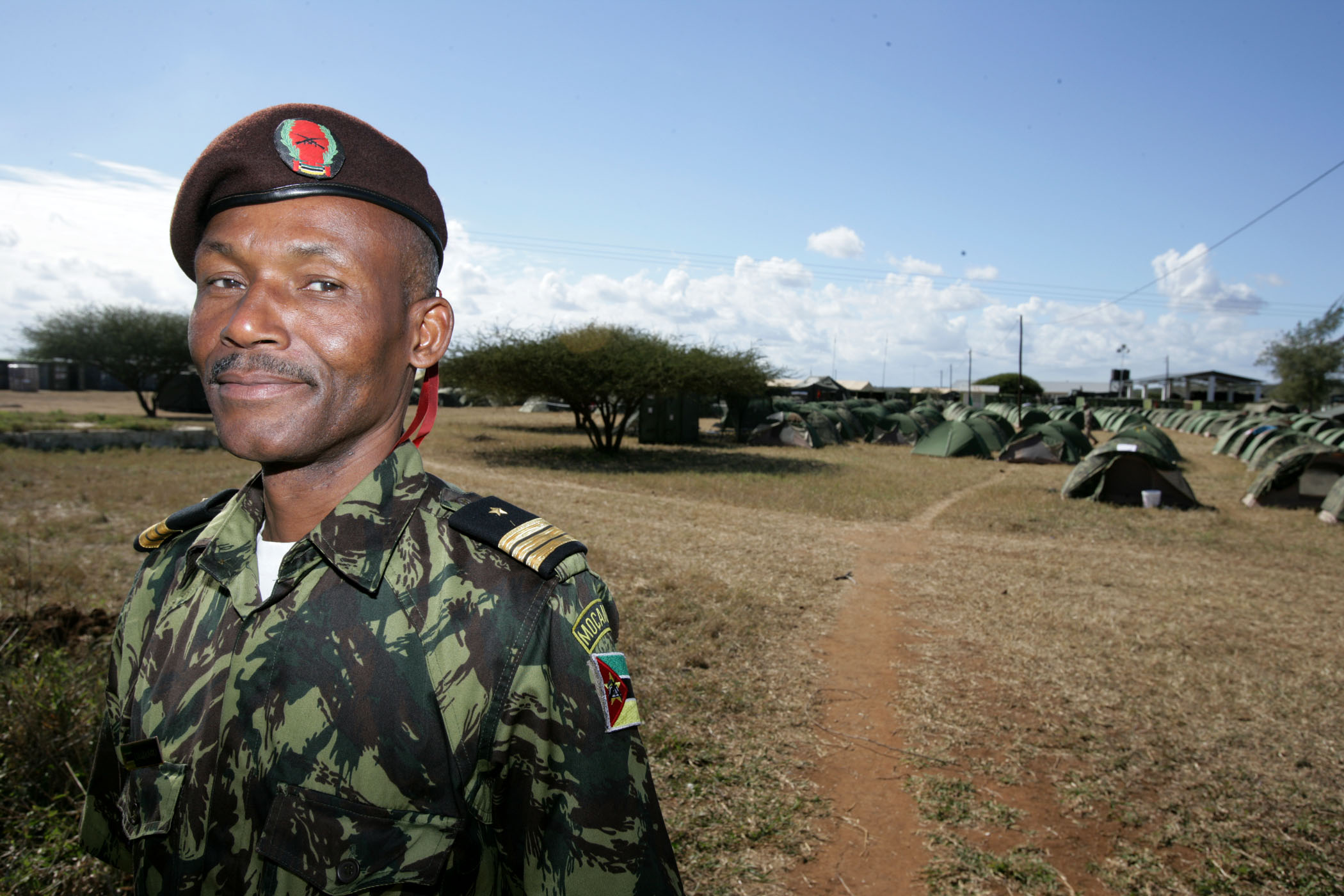
A Mozambique army officer during Exercise SHARED ACCORD 2010 with the United States

The Mozambican Army was formed in 1976 from three conventional battalions, two of which were trained in Tanzania and a third of which was trained in Zambia. Army officer candidates were initially trained in Maputo by Chinese military instructors. In March 1977, following Mozambique's Treaty of Friendship and Cooperation with the Soviet Union, officer candidates became eligible for training in various Warsaw Pact member states. The Soviet military mission in Mozambique assisted in raising a new army composed of five infantry brigades and an armored brigade. At the height of the civil war, this was gradually increased to eight infantry brigades, an armored brigade, and a counter-insurgency brigade modeled after the Zimbabwean 5th Brigade.

The preexisting FAM was abolished after the end of the civil war under the auspices of the Joint Commission for the Formation of the Mozambican Defence Force (CCFADM), which included advisers from Portugal, France, and the United Kingdom. The CCFADM recommended that former army personnel and an equal number of demobilised RENAMO insurgents be integrated into a single force numbering about 30,000. Due to logistics problems and budgetary constraints, however, the army only numbered about 12,195 in 1995. Force levels rarely fluctuated between 1995 and the mid-2000s due to the army's limited resources and low budget priority.

In 2016, the Mozambican Army consisted of 10,000 troops organised into three special forces battalions, seven light infantry battalions, two engineer battalions, two artillery battalions, and a single logistics battalion.

As of 2017, the serving chief of the army was Major General Eugènio Dias Da Silva.

=== Equipment ===
Between 1977 and 1989, the Mozambican Army was lavishly supplied with Soviet weapons, as well as a Soviet-supervised technical programme to oversee their logistics needs and maintenance. Following the collapse of the Soviet Union in 1991, along with the resulting departure of Soviet technical staff, much of this equipment was rendered inoperable. The bulk of the army's hardware remained vested in this ageing and increasingly obsolescent Soviet equipment throughout the 2000s, and serviceability rates have remained low. In 2016, less than 10% of the army's artillery and armoured vehicles were operational.

==== Small arms ====
Name	Image	Caliber	Type	Origin	Notes
Škorpion		.32 ACP	Submachine gun	Czechoslovak Socialist Republic	
Rifles
SKS		7.62×39mm	Semi-automatic rifle	Soviet Union	
AKM		7.62×39mm	Assault rifle	Soviet Union	
PM md. 63		7.62×39mm	Assault rifle	Socialist Republic of Romania	
Vz. 58		7.62×39mm	Assault rifle	Czechoslovak Socialist Republic	
SA80		5.56×45mm	Bullpup Assault rifle	United Kingdom	Sold as part of British military aid.
FN FAL		7.62×51mm	Battle rifle	Belgium	
Sniper rifles
Mosin–Nagant		7.62×54mmR	Bolt-action; Sniper rifle	Soviet Union	
Machine guns
RPK		7.62×39mm	Squad automatic weapon	Soviet Union	
PKM		7.62×54mmR	General-purpose machine gun	Soviet Union	
DShK		12.7×108mm	Heavy machine gun	Soviet Union	
Rocket propelled grenade launchers
RPG-7		40mm	Rocket-propelled grenade	Soviet Union	

==== Anti-tank weapons ====
Name	Image	Type	Origin	Caliber	Notes
B-10		Recoilless rifle	Soviet Union	82mm	
9M14 Malyutka		Anti-tank weapon	Soviet Union		
9K111 Fagot		Anti-tank weapon	Soviet Union		10 in service.

==== Mortars ====
Name	Image	Type	Origin	Quantity	Status	Notes
PM-43		Mortar	Soviet Union	12		
BM-37		Mortar	Soviet Union	40		

==== Tanks ====
Name	Image	Type	Origin	Quantity	Status	Notes
T-54		Medium tank	Soviet Union	60		

==== Scout cars ====
Name	Image	Type	Origin	Quantity	Status	Notes
BRDM-2		Amphibious armored scout car	Soviet Union	28		
BRDM-1		Amphibious armored scout car	Soviet Union	28		

==== Infantry fighting vehicles ====
Name	Image	Type	Origin	Quantity	Status	Notes
BMP-1		Infantry fighting vehicle	Soviet Union	40		

==== Armored personnel carriers ====
Name	Image	Type	Origin	Quantity	Status	Notes
BTR-152		Armored personnel carrier	Soviet Union	100		
BTR-60		Armored personnel carrier	Soviet Union	160		
WZ-551		Armored personnel carrier	China	30-35		
AT105 Saxon		Armored personnel carrier	United Kingdom	25		
Marauder		Armored personnel carrier	South Africa	5		
Casspir		MRAP	South Africa	15		

==== Artillery ====
Name	Image	Type	Origin	Quantity	Status	Notes
Rocket artillery
BM-21 Grad		Multiple rocket launcher	Soviet Union	12		
Field artillery
BS-3		Field gun	Soviet Union	20		
Type 56		Field gun	Soviet Union; China	12		
M-46		Field gun	Soviet Union	6		
M-30		Howitzer	Soviet Union	24		
D-1		Howitzer	Soviet Union	12		
D-30		Howitzer	Soviet Union	12		
M101		Howitzer	United States	12		
D-48		Anti-tank gun	Soviet Union	6		

==== Air defence systems ====
Name	Image	Type	Origin	Quantity	Status	Notes
ZU-23-2		Autocannon	Soviet Union	120		
61-K		Autocannon	Soviet Union	90		10 in storage.
ZSU-57-2		SPAAG	Soviet Union	20		
S-125 Neva		Surface-to-air missile	Soviet Union	103		
9K32 Strela-2		MANPADS	Soviet Union	20		250 in storage.

== Navy ==
There are about 200 personnel in the navy. In September 2004 it was reported that the South African Navy was to donate two of its Namacurra class harbour patrol boat to the Mozambique Navy. The boats were refitted by the naval dockyard at Simon's Town and equipped with outboard motors and navigation equipment donated by the French Navy. The French Navy Durance class command and replenishment oiler Marne (A360) was to deliver the boats to Maputo en route to its ALINDIEN operational area in the Indian Ocean after a refit in Cape Town.

In 2013, the French shipyard CMN Group confirmed a major order by Mozambique, including 6 patrol vessels & interceptors (HSI32).

On 29 July 2019 in the first ever visit by an Defence Minister of India Rajnath Singh donated 2 L&T class Fast interceptor boats to the Navy. A team from Indian Coast Guard will also be stationed to train the crew, support for maintenance and operation of the two boats.

In January 2022, two Solas Marine fast interceptor boat were transferred from Indian Navy to Mozambique on board INS Kesari (L15). Mozambique Navy personnel were given training to operate the new interceptor boats. On 8 November 2024, the Indian Navy gifted another two Fast Interceptor Crafts of the same class to Mozambique. They were delivered via INS Gharial (L23). The Fast Interceptor Craft are capable of reaching speeds of 45 kn (83 km/h; 52 mph) and equipped with machine guns and bullet-resistant cabins. They will enhance Mozambique's capability to address maritime threats.

=== Equipment ===
- PCI-class inshore patrol boat (3 ordered, non-operational)
- 2 × L&T-class fast interceptor craft (donated by India)
- 4 × Solas Marine fast interceptor boat (donated by India)
- MNS Pebane (P-001) ex-Spanish navy Dragonera (P-32) (85 tons, 32 meters) transferred after refit 2012 from the Spanish Navy for a symbolic price (€100).
- 20 - 25 DV 15 interceptors. An unknown number of units in active service.
- 3 × HSI32 Interceptors
- 3 × Ocean Eagle 43 OPV. Three were acquired as part of the CMN deal. Currently all three are based at Pemba.

=== Decommissioned ships ===
- 2x Yevgenya-class minesweeper. Decommissioned in 1993

== See also ==
- Conscription in Mozambique
