= Minister of National Defence (Mozambique) =

- Ministro da Defesa Nacional (Portuguese)
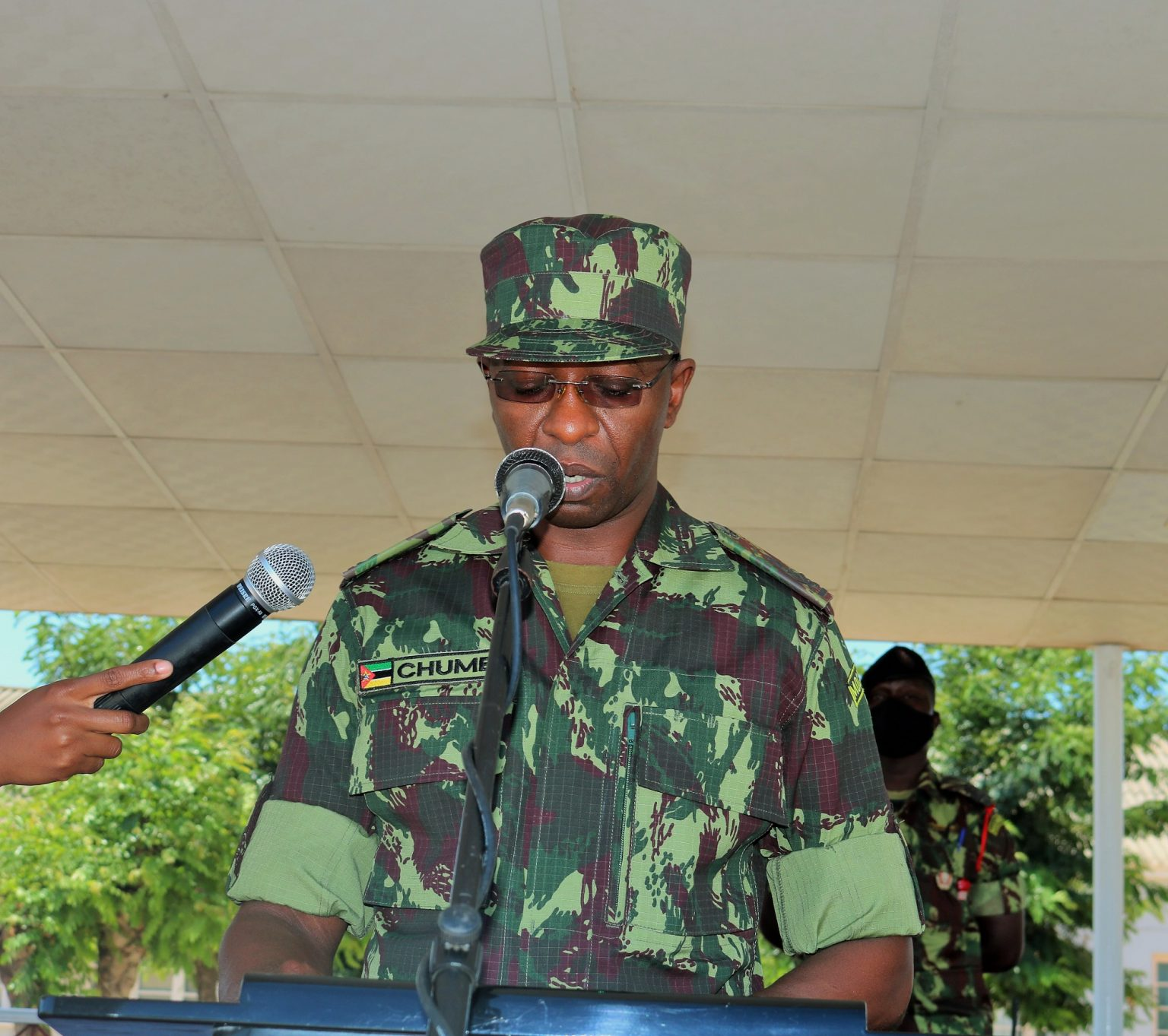
- Incumbent; Cristóvão Artur Chume since 11 November 2021
- Type: Minister
- Member of: cabinet
- Reports to: Prime minister
- Formation: 1975
- First holder: Alberto Chipande
- Deputy: Deputy minister

The minister of national defence (Portuguese: Ministro da Defesa Nacional) is the minister responsible for the Mozambique Defence Armed Forces.

== List of ministers ==
No.	Portrait	Name (born–died)	Term of office			Political party	Ref.
No.	Portrait	Name (born–died)	Took office	Left office	Time in office	Political party	Ref.
1		Army General; Alberto Chipande (born 1939)	1975	1994	18–19 years	FRELIMO	
2		Aguiar Mazula	1994	2000	5–6 years	FRELIMO	
3		Tobias Joaquim Dai (1950–2026)	17 January 2000	26 March 2008	8 years, 69 days	FRELIMO	
4		Filipe Nyusi (born 1959)	27 March 2008	14 March 2014	5 years, 352 days	FRELIMO	
5		Agostinho Mondlane (born 1959)	14 March 2014	15 January 2015	307 days	FRELIMO	
6		Atanásio Mtumuke (born 1950)	15 January 2015	17 January 2020	5 years, 2 days	FRELIMO	
7		Jaime Bessa Augusto Neto (born 1971)	17 January 2020	11 November 2021	1 year, 298 days	FRELIMO	
8		Cristóvão Artur Chume	11 November 2021	Incumbent	4 years, 357 days	FRELIMO	
