= List of current defence ministers =

This is a list of current defence ministers of the 193 United Nations member states. The Holy See (Vatican City) and the State of Palestine do not maintain ministers of defence.

Defence ministers of sovereign countries with limited recognition are included in a separate table.

== States recognised by the United Nations ==
State	List	Defence minister	Political affiliation	Assumed office
Afghanistan	List	Mullah Yaqoob	Taliban	7 September 2021
Albania	List	Ermal Nufi	Socialist Party	26 February 2026
Algeria	List	Abdelmadjid Tebboune (also President)	National Liberation Front	19 December 2019
Andorra	—N/a			
Angola	List	João Ernesto dos Santos	Popular Movement for the Liberation of Angola	6 April 2020
Antigua and Barbuda		Gaston Browne (also Prime Minister)	Labour Party	13 June 2014
Argentina	List	Carlos Presti	Independent	10 December 2025
Armenia	List	Suren Papikyan	Civil Contract	15 November 2021
Australia	List	Richard Marles	Labor Party	1 June 2022
Austria	List	Klaudia Tanner	People's Party	7 January 2020
Azerbaijan	List	Colonel general Zakir Hasanov	New Azerbaijan Party	22 October 2013
Bahamas	List	Wayne Munroe	Progressive Liberal Party	20 September 2021
Bahrain		Abdullah bin Hassan Al-Nuaimi		4 December 2018
Bangladesh	List	Tarique Rahman (also Prime Minister)	Nationalist Party	17 February 2026
Barbados		Mia Mottley (also Prime Minister)	Labour Party	26 May 2018
Belarus	List	Lieutenant general Viktor Khrenin	Independent	20 January 2020
Belgium	List	Theo Francken	New Flemish Alliance	3 February 2025
Belize		Florencio Marin Jr.	United Democratic Party	13 November 2020
Benin		Alain Nouatin	Independent	25 May 2021
Bhutan	—N/a			
Bolivia		Raúl Salinas	Independent	8 November 2025
Bosnia and Herzegovina	List	Zukan Helez	Social Democratic Party	25 January 2023
Botswana	List	Moeti Mohwasa	Independent	15 November 2024
Brazil	List	José Múcio	Democratic Renewal Party	1 January 2023
Brunei	List	Hassanal Bolkiah (also Sultan)		7 September 1986
Bulgaria	List	Lieutenant general Atanas Zapryanov	Independent	9 April 2024
Burkina Faso		Célestin Simporé		8 December 2024
Burundi	List	Marie Chantal Nijimbere		5 August 2025
Cambodia	List	General Tea Seiha	People's Party	22 August 2023
Cameroon	List	Joseph Beti Assomo	People's Democratic Movement	2 October 2015
Canada	List	David McGuinty	Liberal Party	13 May 2025
Cape Verde		Luís Filipe Tavares	Movement for Democracy	22 April 2016
Central African Republic		Claude Rameaux Bireau		23 June 2021
Chad		Dago Yacouba		21 October 2023
Chile	List	Fernando Barros		11 March 2026
China	List	Admiral Dong Jun	Communist Party	29 December 2023
Colombia	List	Major general Pedro Arnulfo Sánchez	Independent	3 March 2025
Comoros		Youssoufa Mohamed Ali		31 May 2016
Republic of the Congo		Major general Charles Richard Mondjo		25 September 2012
Democratic Republic of the Congo	List	Alexandre Luba Ntambo		28 April 2012
Costa Rica (Note: Ministry of Public Security is in charge of maintaining public order, organizing police forces, preventing crime and, if necessary, defense of national sovereignty Ministry of Public Security Functions)		Mario Zamora Cordero		10 May 2023
Ivory Coast		Téné Birahima Ouattara	Rally of the Republicans	8 March 2021
Croatia	List	Ivan Anušić	Democratic Union	16 November 2023
Cuba	List	Corps general Álvaro López Miera	Communist Party	15 April 2021
Cyprus	List	Vasilis Palmas		10 January 2024
Czech Republic	List	Lieutenant general Jaromír Zůna	Independent	15 December 2025
Denmark	List	Jeppe Bruus	Social Democrats	22 August 2023
Djibouti	List	Hassan Omar Mohamed		5 May 2019
Dominica		—N/a		
Dominican Republic		Carlos Antonio Fernández Onofre		16 August 2024
East Timor	List	Pedro Klamar Fuik	Independent	1 July 2023
Ecuador	List	Gian Carlo Loffredo Rendón		23 November 2023
Egypt	List	General Abdel Mageed Saqr	Independent	3 July 2024
El Salvador	List	Admiral René Merino Monroy	Independent	1 June 2019
Equatorial Guinea	List	Victoriano Bibang Nsue Okomo		19 August 2020
Eritrea	List	General Filipos Woldeyohannes		19 March 2014
Estonia	List	Hanno Pevkur	Reform Party	18 July 2022
Ethiopia	List	Aisha Mohammed		20 May 2024
Fiji	List	Pio Tikoduadua	National Federation Party	24 December 2022
Finland	List	Antti Häkkänen	National Coalition Party	20 June 2023
France	List	Catherine Vautrin	Renaissance	12 October 2025
Gabon	List	Brigitte Onkanowa		10 September 2023
(The Gambia) Gambia		Major Sheikh Omar Faye	Independent	22 August 2019
Georgia	List	Irakli Chikovani	Georgian Dream	8 February 2024
Germany	List	Boris Pistorius	Social Democratic Party	19 January 2023
Ghana	List	Cassiel Ato Baah Forson (acting)	National Democratic Congress	6 August 2025
Greece	List	Nikos Dendias	New Democracy	27 June 2023
Grenada		Dickon Mitchell (also Prime Minister)	National Democratic Congress	24 June 2022
Guatemala	List	Brigadier general Henry Saenz Ramos	Independent	15 January 2024
Guinea		Aboubacar Sidiki Camara		21 October 2021
Guinea-Bissau		Stive Lassana Manssaly		29 November 2025
Guyana		—N/a		
Haiti	List	Jean Michel Moïse		19 November 2024
Holy See				
Honduras		Roosevelt Hernández Aguilar		18 December 2025
Hungary	List	Kristóf Szalay-Bobrovniczky	Independent	24 May 2022
Iceland (Note: Ministry for Foreign Affairs is the central authority for defence National Security of Iceland)	List	Þorgerður Katrín Gunnarsdóttir	Viðreisn	21 December 2024
India	List	Rajnath Singh	Bharatiya Janata Party	31 May 2019
Indonesia	List	Honorary general Sjafrie Sjamsoeddin	Independent	21 October 2024
Iran	List	Mehrdad Akhlaghi	Independent	18 October 2026
Iraq	List	Mohammed Shia' Al Sudani (acting) (also Prime Minister)	Independent	2 March 2026
Ireland	List	Helen McEntee	Fine Gael	18 November 2025
Israel	List	Captain Israel Katz	Likud	5 November 2024
Italy	List	Guido Crosetto	Brothers of Italy	22 October 2022
Jamaica		Andrew Holness (also Prime Minister)	Labour Party	3 March 2016
Japan	List	Shinjirō Koizumi	Liberal Democratic Party	21 October 2025
Jordan	List	Jafar Hassan (also Prime Minister)		15 September 2024
Kazakhstan	List	Lieutenant general Däuren Qosanov		8 June 2025
Kenya	List	Soipan Tuya		8 August 2024
Kiribati		—N/a		
North Korea	List	General No Kwang-chol	Workers' Party	8 October 2024
South Korea	List	Ahn Gyu-back	Democratic Party	25 July 2025
Kuwait	List	Abdullah Ali Al-Abdullah Al-Salem Al-Sabah		4 February 2025
Kyrgyzstan	List	Ruslan Mukambetov		22 May 2025
Laos	List	Chansamone Chanyalath	People's Revolutionary Party	20 April 2016
Latvia	List	Andris Sprūds	The Progressives	15 September 2023
Lebanon	List	Major general Michel Menassa	Independent	8 February 2025
Lesotho		Sam Matekane (also Prime Minister)	Revolution for Prosperity	28 October 2022
Liberia	List	Geraldine George		13 February 2024
Libya	List	Abdul Hamid Dbeibeh (also Prime Minister)	Independent	15 March 2021
Liechtenstein		—N/a		
Lithuania	List	Robertas Kaunas	Social Democratic Party	11 November 2025
Luxembourg	List	Yuriko Backes	Democratic Party	17 November 2023
Madagascar	List	Maminirina Ely Razafitombo		28 October 2025
Malawi		Chimwemwe Chipungu	Independent	30 October 2025
Malaysia	List	Mohamed Khaled Nordin	Barisan Nasional	12 December 2023
Maldives	List	Mohamed Ghassan Maumoon		17 November 2023
Mali		Assimi Goïta		4 May 2026
Malta		Byron Camilleri	Labor Party	15 January 2020
Marshall Islands		—N/a		
Mauritania		Ba Ousmane		11 October 2026
Mauritius		Navin Ramgoolam (also Prime Minister)	Labour Party	13 November 2024
Mexico	List	Division general Ricardo Trevilla Trejo		1 October 2024
Micronesia		—N/a		
Moldova	List	Anatolie Nosatîi	Independent	6 August 2021
Monaco		—N/a		
Mongolia	List	Dambyn Batlut	People's Party	18 June 2025
Montenegro	List	Dragan Krapović	Democratic Montenegro	31 October 2023
Morocco		Abdellatif Loudiyi		2 December 2010
Mozambique	List	Major general Cristóvão Artur Chume	FRELIMO	11 November 2021
Myanmar	List	General Maung Maung Aye		18 December 2024
Namibia	List	Frans Kapofi	SWAPO	22 April 2021
Nauru		—N/a		
Nepal	List	Balen Shah (also Prime Minister)	Rastriya Swatantra Party	27 March 2026
Netherlands	List	Dilan Yeşilgöz	People's Party for Freedom and Democracy	23 February 2026
New Zealand	List	Judith Collins	National Party	27 November 2023
Nicaragua		Captain Rosa Adelina Barahona Castro	Sandinista National Liberation Front	19 August 2019
Niger		General Salifou Modi		28 July 2023
Nigeria	List	General Christopher Gwabin Musa		4 December 2025
North Macedonia	List	Vlado Misajlovski	VMRO-DPMNE	23 June 2024
Norway	List	Tore Onshuus Sandvik	Labour Party	4 February 2025
Oman	List	Haitham bin Tariq (also Sultan)		11 January 2020
Pakistan	List	Khawaja Asif	Muslim League (N)	19 April 2022
Palau		—N/a		
Palestine				
Panama		—N/a		
Papua New Guinea		Billy Joseph	Social Democratic Party	19 January 2024
Paraguay		General Bernardino Soto Estigarribia		15 August 2018
Peru	List	César Díaz Peche	Independent	14 October 2025
Philippines	List	Colonel Gilbert Teodoro	People's Reform Party	5 June 2023
Poland	List	Władysław Kosiniak-Kamysz	People's Party	13 December 2023
Portugal	List	Nuno Melo	CDS – People's Party	2 April 2024
Qatar		Saoud bin Abdulrahman Al Thani		12 November 2024
Romania	List	Radu-Dinel Miruță	Save Romania Union	23 December 2025
Russia	List	Andrey Belousov	Independent	14 May 2024
Rwanda	List	Brigadier general Juvenal Marizamunda	Patriotic Front	6 June 2023
Saint Kitts and Nevis		—N/a		
Saint Lucia		Philip J. Pierre (also Prime Minister)		28 July 2021
Saint Vincent and the Grenadines		—N/a		
Samoa		—N/a		
San Marino		—N/a		
São Tomé and Príncipe	List	Jorge Amado		11 November 2022
Saudi Arabia	List	Khalid bin Salman		27 September 2022
Senegal	List	General Birame Diop		5 April 2024
Serbia	List	Bratislav Gašić	Progressive Party	2 May 2024
Seychelles		Patrick Herminie (also President)	Linyon Demokratik Seselwa	26 October 2025
Sierra Leone	List	Major Alfred Paolo Conteh	All People's Congress	26 October 2007
Singapore	List	Major general Chan Chun Sing	People's Action Party	23 May 2025
Slovakia	List	Robert Kaliňák	Direction – Social Democracy	25 October 2023
Slovenia	List	Borut Sajovic	Freedom Movement	7 October 2024
Solomon Islands		Christopher Laore	Independent	22 October 2012
Somalia	List	Ahmed Moalim Fiqi	Union for Peace and Development Party	25 August 2022
South Africa	List	Angie Motshekga	African National Congress	3 July 2024
South Sudan	List	General Chol Thon Balok		29 March 2023
Spain	List	Margarita Robles	Independent	7 June 2018
Sri Lanka	List	Anura Kumara Dissanayake (also President)	National People's Power	23 September 2024
Sudan	List	Hassan Daoud Kayan		28 June 2025
Suriname		Krishna Mathoera	Progressive Reform Party	16 July 2020
Eswatini		—N/a		
Sweden	List	Pål Jonson	Moderate Party	18 October 2022
Switzerland	List	Colonel Martin Pfister	The Centre	1 April 2025
Syria	List	Major general Murhaf Abu Qasra	Independent	21 December 2024
Tajikistan	List	Lieutenant general Emomali Sobirzoda		23 January 2025
Tanzania	List	Rhimo Simeon Nyansaho		17 November 2025
Thailand	List	General Natthaphon Narkphanit	Independent	30 June 2025
Togo		Faure Gnassingbé (also President of the Council of Ministers)	Union for the Republic	3 May 2025
Tonga		Tupoutoʻa ʻUlukalala (also Crown Prince)		31 December 2025
Trinidad and Tobago		Wayne Sturge		3 May 2025
Tunisia	List	Khaled Sehili	Independent	25 August 2024
Turkey	List	Yaşar Güler	Independent	4 June 2023
Turkmenistan	List	Lieutenant general Begenç Gündogdyýew	Democratic Party	14 June 2018
Tuvalu		—N/a		
Uganda	List	Jacob Oboth-Oboth		4 April 2024
Ukraine	List	Mykhailo Fedorov	Independent	14 January 2026
United Arab Emirates		Hamdan bin Mohammed Al Maktoum		14 July 2024
United Kingdom	List	Wes Streeting	Labour Party	20 July 2026
United States	List	Pete Hegseth	Republican	25 January 2025
Uruguay	List	Sandra Lazo	Broad Front	1 March 2025
Uzbekistan	List	Major general Shukhrat Kholmukhamedov		23 November 2024
Vanuatu		—N/a		
Venezuela	List	General-in-chief Vladimir Padrino López	United Socialist Party	24 October 2014
Vietnam	List	General Phan Văn Giang	Communist Party	8 April 2021
Yemen	List	Lieutenant general Taher al-Aqili		6 February 2026
Zambia	List	Ambrose Lufuma	United Party for National Development	8 September 2021
Zimbabwe	List	Oppah Muchinguri-Kashiri	African National Union – Patriotic Front	7 September 2018

== States with limited recognition, non-UN member states ==
State	List	Defence minister	Party	Assumed office
Abkhazia (Republic of Abkhazia)		Vladimir Anua		1 June 2020
Kosovo (Republic of Kosovo)		Ejup Maqedonci		8 August 2023
Northern Cyprus (Turkish Republic of Northern Cyprus)		—N/a		
Sahrawi Republic (Sahrawi Arab Democratic Republic)		Mohamed Lamine Mohamed Ahmed		14 February 2023
Somaliland (Republic of Somaliland)		Mohamed Yusuf Ali		14 December 2024
South Ossetia (Republic of South Ossetia–the State of Alania)		Yuri Yarovitsky		2 June 2025
Taiwan (Republic of China)	List	Wellington Koo	Democratic Progressive Party	20 May 2024
Transnistria (Pridnestrovian Moldavian Republic)		Oleg Obruchkov		26 December 2016

== See also ==
- Lists of office-holders
- Chief of defence
