= Lídia Cardoso =

Mozambican manager

Her Excellency Lídia Cardoso

Minister of the Sea, Inland Waters and Fisheries
- Incumbent
- Assumed office 4 March 2022
- President: Filipe Nyusi
- Preceded by: Augusta Maíta

Personal details
- Profession: Manager

Lídia de Fátima da Graça Cardoso is a Mozambican manager who has been the Minister of the Sea, Inland Waters and Fisheries since March 2022. She replaced Augusta Maíta. Cardoso had previously been the Deputy Minister of Health from February 2020 until March 2022. Before joining the government, she been an adviser for the management of medical logistics.
