= Antonio Augusto Eduardo Namburete =

Mozambican academic and politician

Eduardo Namburete (born 1968) is a Mozambican academic and politician. He represented the country's largest opposition party RENAMO in the Assembly of the Republic. He was involved as a mediator in the process which led to the signing of the Maputo Accord in 2019 and was appointed as Mozambique's Ambassador to Algeria in 2024.

== Life and career ==
Eduardo Namburete was in born 1969. He served for 15 years as a deputy of the Assembly of the Republic representing the largest opposition party RENAMO for the constituency of Maputo. In the Assembly, he was a member of the Constitutional, Human Rights and Legal Affairs Committee. In July 2022 he was elected vice-president of the Africa Parliamentarians Network Against Corruption, based in Ghana.

He was involved as a mediator in the peace negotiations between the government of Mozambique and RENAMO which resulted in the signing of the Maputo Accord in 2019. He was a RENAMO representative of the Military Affairs Commission and played an active role in the Disarmament, Demobilization and Reintegration (DDR) of former combatants.

He is also the founding Dean of and a Senior Lecturer at the Eduardo Mondlane University School of Communication and Arts and has a master's degree in communications from Southern University in Louisiana, US.
