= Cristóvão Artur Chume =

Mozambican military general

His Excellency Cristóvão Artur Chume
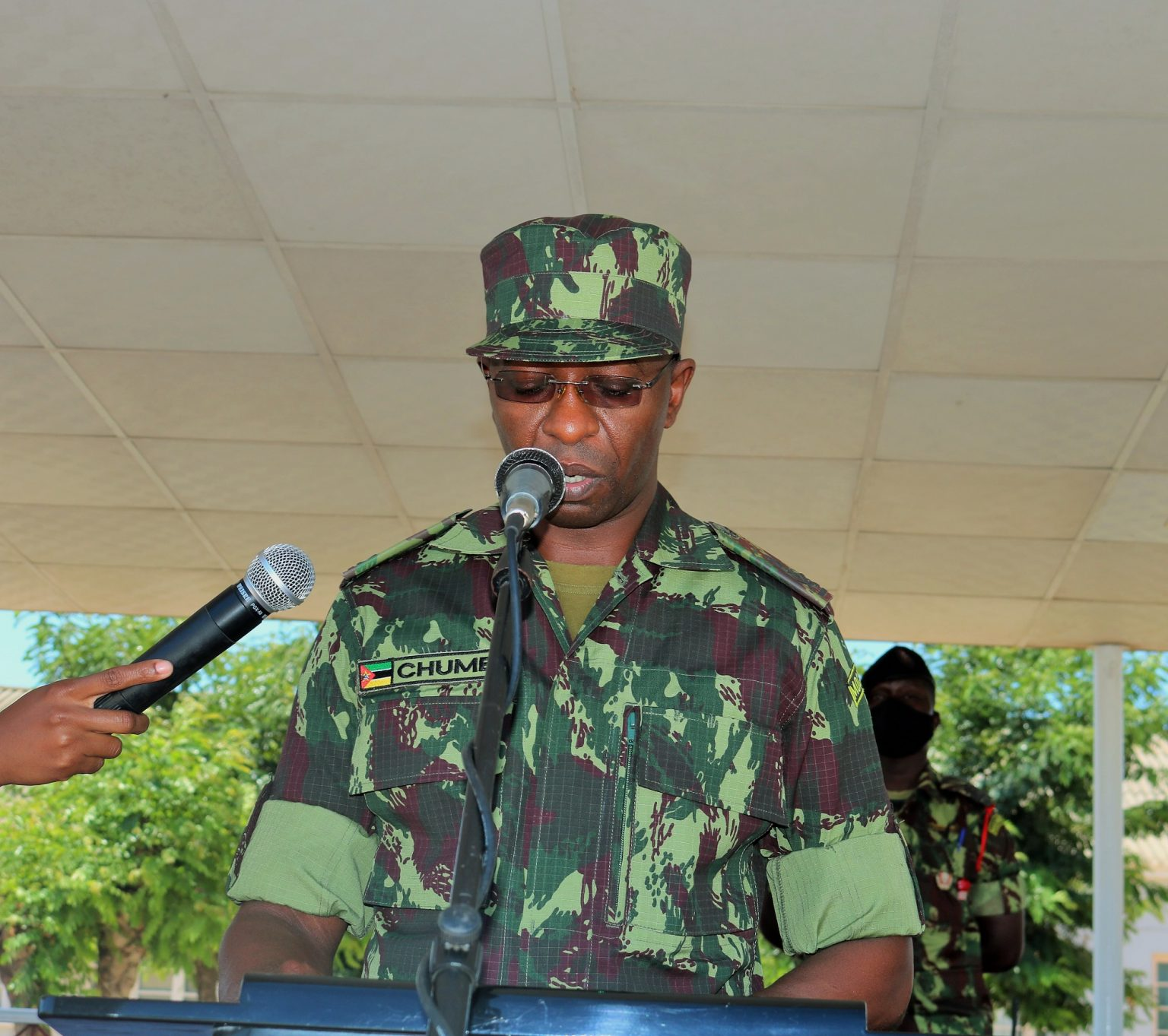
- Chume in 2021

Minister of National Defense of Mozambique
- Incumbent
- Assumed office 11 November 2021
- President: Filipe Nyusi
- Prime Minister: Adriano Maleiane; Carlos Agostinho do Rosário
- Preceded by: Jaime Neto

Commander of the Mozambican Army
- In office 12 March 2021 – 11 November 2021
- President: Filipe Nyusi

Personal details
- Party: FRELIMO

Military service
- Allegiance: Mozambique
- Branch/service: Mozambican Army
- Years of service: 1990 – present
- Rank: Major-General
- Battles/wars: RENAMO insurgency (2013–2021); Insurgency in Cabo Delgado

Cristóvão Artur Chume is a Mozambican military general who was appointed Minister of National Defense in November 2021. He had previously served as the Commander of the Army Branch of the Mozambique Defence Armed Forces from March to November 2021.

== Background ==
Chume served as the National Director of Defense Policy from 2011 to 2019. During the clashes between RENAMO and the Defense and Security Forces between 2013 and 2014, Chume was one of the main faces representing the Ministry of Defense.

In 2019, he was appointed head of the Marechal Samora Machel Military Academy in Nampula. On 12 March 2021, Chume was appointed the Commander of the Army Branch of the Mozambique Defence Armed Forces (MDAF) by president Filipe Nyusi after changes in the structure of the Defense Armed Forces promoted by the Mozambican Head of State. Major-General Francisco Zacarias Mataruca was appointed to replace him as chief of the Military Academy.

On 11 November 2021, Nyusi dismissed Chume as Commander of the Army Branch and appointed him as Minister of National Defense, replacing Jaime Neto, who had been sacked by Nyusi a day earlier.

In 2025, he made an agreement with Monica Chang'anamuno who was his opposite number as she was Malawi's Minister of Defence. The new agreement's aim was to cut down on costs at border crossings and to increase the pressure on smuggling and illegal trades and mining. The agreement, signed in Maputo in June, set out rules that allowed the armed forces of the two nations to organise joint patrols and operations.
