= Mozambique–Ukraine relations =

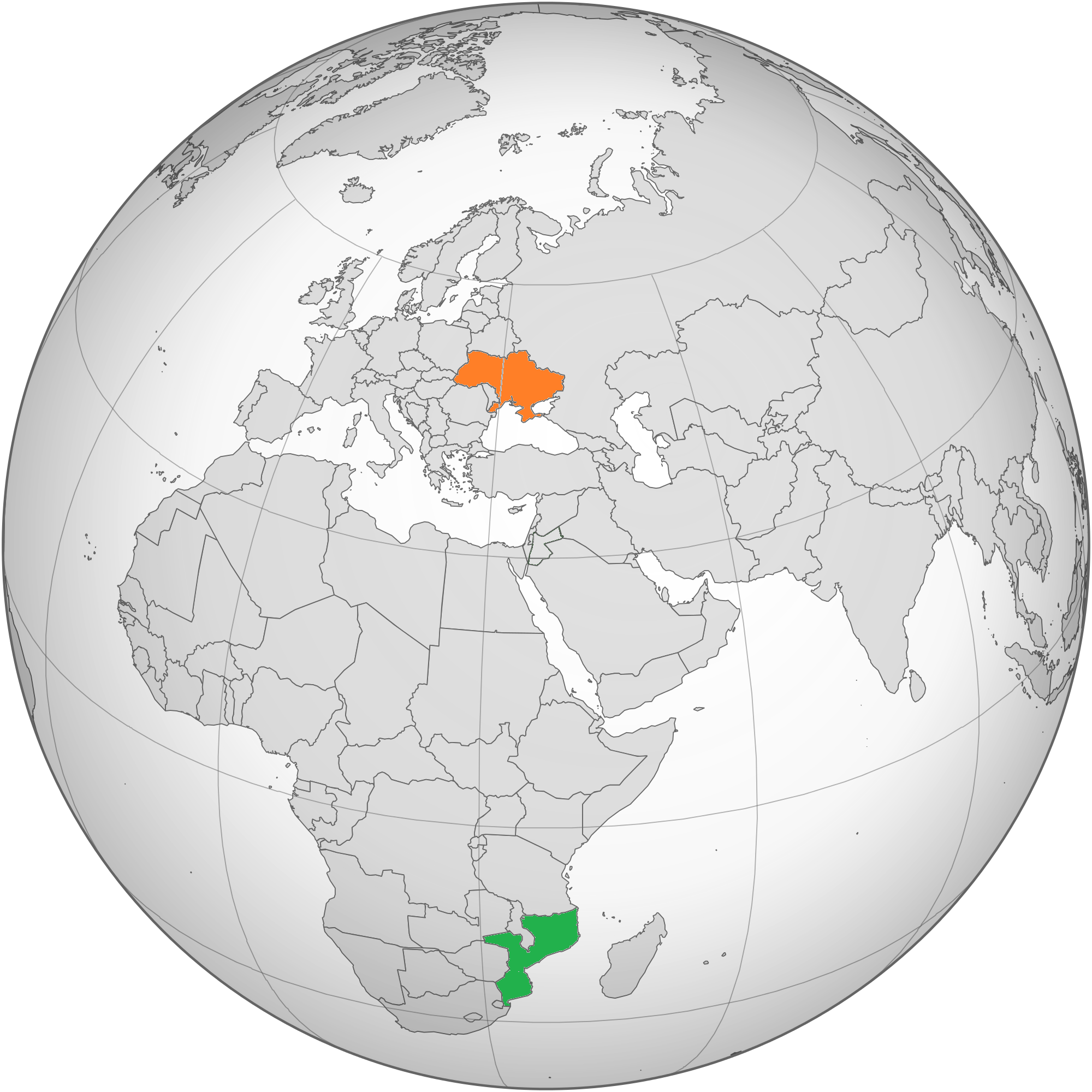
- Mozambique: Ukraine

Diplomatic mission
- None: Embassy of Ukraine, Maputo

Envoy
- None: Rostyslav Tronenko

Mozambique–Ukraine relations refers to bilateral relations between Mozambique and Ukraine.

== History ==
On 17 March, 1992, Mozambique officially recognized the Ukrainian Declaration of Independence, and later established diplomatic relations on 19 August, 1993.

In 2006-2007, Ukrainians in Mozambique were represented by the Ukrainian embassy in Angola. Then until 2024, the interests of Ukrainian citizens in Mozambique were protected by the Ukrainian Embassy in South Africa.

On 23 October, 2017, Ukrainian officially opened an honorary consulate in the Mozambiquan capital of Maputo.

In May 2023, Ukrainian Foreign Minister Dmytro Kuleba and Mozambican President Filipe Nyusi agreed to establish a Ukrainian embassy in Mozambique. Then on 15 April, 2024, the Ukrainian embassy in Mozambique officially opened.

On 8 January, 2025, Ukrainian president Volodymyr Zelenskyy appointed Rostyslav Tronenko as Ambassador to Mozambique.

== Trade relations ==
In 2021, the trade volume between Mozambique and Ukraine amounted to $34.88 million USD. Among them, $22.88 million were Ukrainian exports to Mozambique, while $12 million were Mozambican exports to Ukraine. Ukrainian exports consisted primarily of grain (15.8M) and fertilizers (6M), while Mozambique's exports were mostly tobacco products (11.55M).
