= Guebuza =

Guebuza is a surname. Notable people with the surname include:

- Armando Guebuza (born 1943), Mozambican politician
- Maria da Luz Guebuza (born 1960), Mozambican advocate
