= Chief of General Staff (Mozambique) =

Chief of the General Staff
- Chefe do Estado-Maior-General das Forças Armadas de Defesa de Moçambique (Portuguese)
- Flag of the armed forces
- Incumbent; Major-general Julio dos Santos Jane since 10 April 2025
- Mozambique Defence Armed Forces
- Reports to: Minister of National Defence
- Appointer: President
- Formation: 1975
- Website: Official website

The Chief of the General Staff of the Mozambique Defence Armed Forces (Portuguese: Chefe do Estado-Maior-General das Forças Armadas de Defesa de Moçambique; CEMFADM) is the highest-ranked officer in the Mozambique Defence Armed Forces.

== List of officeholders ==
=== Republic of Mozambique (1990–present) ===
No.	Photo	Name (born–died)	Term of office			Ref.
No.	Photo	Name (born–died)	Took office	Left office	Time in office	Ref.
1		Lagos Henriques Lidimo	August 1994	20 March 2008	13 years, 7 months	
2		Paulino Jose Macaringue	20 March 2008	26 June 2013	5 years, 98 days	
3		Graça Tomás Chongo	26 June 2013	26 October 2017	4 years, 122 days	
4		General do exército Lázaro Henriques Lopes Menete	26 October 2017	14 January 2021	3 years, 138 days	
5		General do exército Eugénio Mussa (?–2021)	14 January 2021	8 February 2021 †	25 days	
6		Almirante; Joaquim Rivas Mangrasse	13 March 2021	10 April 2025	4 years, 28 days	
7		Major-general; Julio dos Santos Jane	10 April 2025	Incumbent	1 year, 150 days	
