= First Lady of Mozambique =

Symbolic government rank in Mozambique

- Incumbent; Gueta Selemane Chapo since 15 January 2025
- Residence: Palácio da Ponta Vermelha
- Inaugural holder: Graça Machel
- Formation: 25 June 1975

First Lady of Mozambique (Portuguese: Primeira-Dama de Moçambique) is the title held by the wife of the president of Mozambique. There have been just four first ladies since Mozambique's independence in 1975. The country's current first lady is Gueta Selemane Chapo, wife of President Daniel Chapo, who has held the position since 2025.

== Office of the First Lady ==
The Office of the First Lady was established by Article 17 of the Internal Regulations Decree. The first lady supports and developments cultural and social initiatives with the official assistance of the first lady's office. The office is headed by a presidential cabinet member.

== History ==
Former Mozambican first lady Graça Machel is the only person to have served as the first lady of two different republics. She became the first lady of South Africa on 18 July 1998 upon her marriage to Nelson Mandela.

== First ladies of Mozambique ==
No.	Name (Born/Died)	Portrait	Term begins	Term ends	President of Mozambique	Portrait of President of Mozambique	Notes
1	Graça Machel (Born 1945–)		25 June 1975	19 October 1986	Samora Machel		
2	Marcelina Chissano		6 November 1986	2 February 2005	Joaquim Chissano		
3	Maria da Luz Guebuza (Born 1960–)		2 February 2005	15 January 2015	Armando Guebuza		
4	Isaura Nyusi (Born 1962–)		15 January 2015	15 January 2025	Filipe Nyusi		
5	Gueta Selemane Chapo		15 January 2025	Incumbent	Daniel Chapo		

== See also ==
- President of Mozambique
