= Military ranks of Mozambique =

The Military ranks of Mozambique form the system of hierarchical relationships in the Mozambique Defence Armed Forces (FADM). There are two basic systems of ranks, one used both by the army and the air force and the other used by the navy.

After the independence from Portugal in 1975, under the rule of Samora Machel, a Soviet-style system of rank insignia for military ranks was introduced in the then Mozambique Liberation People's Forces (FPLM). After the end of the Mozambican Civil War, the introduction of democracy and the transformation of the Mozambican armed forces into the FADM in 1994, a new system of rank insignia was introduced. This new system is loosely inspired by the Portuguese system of rank insignia.

== Ranks and insignia ==
=== Commissioned officer ranks ===
The rank insignia of commissioned officers.

Rank group	General / flag officers			Senior officers			Junior officers
Mozambican Army
Mozambican Army	Coronel-general	Tenente-general	Major-general	Coronel	Tenente-coronel	Major	Capitão	Tenente	Alferes
Mozambique Naval Command
Mozambique Naval Command	Almirante	Vice-almirante	Contra-almirante	Capitão de mar e guerra	Capitão de fragata	Capitão-tenente	Primeiro-tenente	Segundo-tenente	Guarda-marinha
Mozambique Air Force
Mozambique Air Force	Coronel General	Tenente General	Major General	Coronel	Tenente Coronel	Major	Capitão	Tenente	Alferes
Rank group	General / flag officers			Senior officers			Junior officers

=== Other ranks ===
The rank insignia of non-commissioned officers and enlisted personnel.

Rank group	Senior NCOs			Junior NCOs		Enlisted
Mozambican Army
Mozambican Army	Intendente	Primeiro-sargento	Segundo-sargento	Terceiro-sargento	Cabo	Primeiro soldado
Mozambique Naval Command
Mozambique Naval Command	Intendente	Primeiro-sargento	Segundo-sargento			Primeiro-cabo	Segundo-cabo	Marinheiro
Mozambique Air Force
Mozambique Air Force	Intendente	Primeiro-sargento	Segundo-sargento	Terceiro-sargento	Cabo	Primeiro soldado
Rank group	Senior NCOs			Junior NCOs		Enlisted

== Historical rank insignia (1975-1994) ==
=== Commissioned officer ranks ===
The People's Republic of Mozambique's rank insignia for commissioned officers.

Rank group	General / flag officers					Senior officers			Junior officers
People's Republic of Mozambique Army
People's Republic of Mozambique Army	Marechal	General do exército	Coronel general	Tenente general	Major general	Coronel	Tenente coronel	Major	Capitão	Tenente	Alferes
People's Republic of Mozambique Navy
People's Republic of Mozambique Navy			Almirante	Vice-almirante	Contra-almirante	Capitão de Mar Guerra	Capitão de Fragata	Capitão-tenente	Primeiro-tenente	Segundo-tenente	Guarda-marinha
People's Republic of Mozambique Air Force
People's Republic of Mozambique Air Force		General do Forca Aérea	Coronel general	Tenente general	Major general	Coronel	Tenente coronel	Major	Capitão	Tenente	Alferes
Rank group	General / flag officers					Senior officers			Junior officers

=== Other ranks ===
The People's Republic of Mozambique's rank insignia for NCOs and enlisted personnel.

Rank group	Senior NCOs			Junior NCOs	Enlisted
People's Republic of Mozambique Army					No insignia
People's Republic of Mozambique Army	Sergeant major Intendente	First Sergeant; Primeiro-sargento	Second Sergeant; Segundo-sargento	Third Sergeant; Terceiro-sargento	Private; Soldado
People's Republic of Mozambique Air Force					No insignia
People's Republic of Mozambique Air Force	Sergeant major Intendente	First Sergeant; Primeiro-sargento	Second Sergeant; Segundo-sargento	Third Sergeant; Terceiro-sargento	Private; Soldado
Rank group	Senior NCOs			Junior NCOs	Enlisted
