= Isaura Nyusi =

Mozambican civil servant and educator who is the First Lady of Mozambique

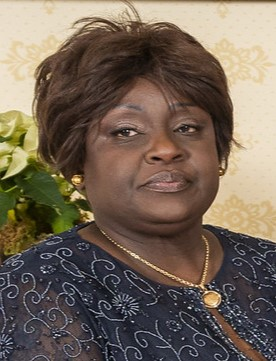

First Lady of Mozambique
- In office 15 January 2015 – 15 January 2025
- President: Filipe Nyusi
- Preceded by: Maria da Luz Guebuza
- Succeeded by: Gueta Selemane Chapo

Personal details
- Born: Isaura Gonçalo Ferrão; October 2, 1962 (age 63) Tete, Tete Province, Portuguese Mozambique
- Party: FRELIMO
- Spouse: Filipe Nyusi
- Children: 4

Isaura Gonçalo Ferrão Nyusi (born October 2, 1962) is a Mozambican civil servant and educator who has served as the First Lady of Mozambique 15 January 2015 until 15 January 2025, as the wife of President Filipe Nyusi.

Nyusi became the President of the Organization of Mozambican Women (OMM), the women's political arm of FRELIMO, on February 11, 2016.
