= Inauguration of Filipe Nyusi =

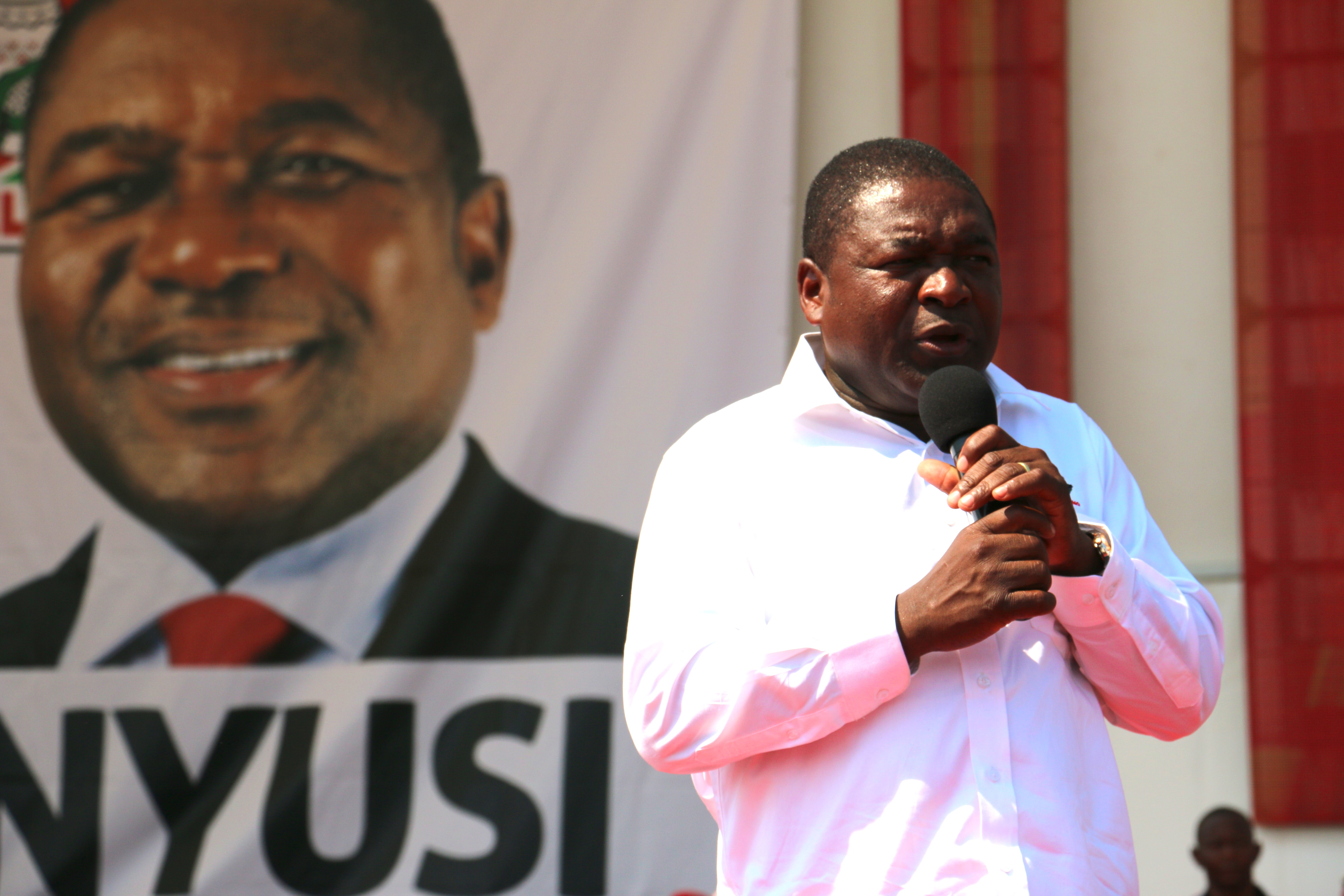
- Date: 15 January 2015
- Location: Independence Square, Maputo
- Participants: Filipe Nyusi

Filipe Nyusi was inaugurated as the fourth president of Mozambique on Thursday, 15 January 2015. The inauguration marked the beginning of the first term of Nyusi as president.

== Attendance ==
=== Dignitaries ===
Country	Title	Dignitary
Angola	Welfare Minister	João Baptista Kussumua
Botswana	Vice President	Mokgweetsi Masisi
China	Justice Minister	Wu Aiying
East Timor	Foreign Minister	José Luís Guterres
India	State Minister	V. K. Singh
Lesotho	King	Letsie III
Malawi	Foreign Minister	George Chaponda
Namibia	President	Hifikepunye Pohamba
Portugal	President	Aníbal Cavaco Silva
South Africa	President	Jacob Zuma
Sweden	Foreign Minister	Margot Wallström
Swaziland	Prime Minister	Barnabas Sibusiso Dlamini
Tanzania	President	Jakaya Kikwete
Zimbabwe	Vice President	Phelekezela Mphoko

=== Former leaders ===
Country	Title	Dignitary
South Africa	2nd President	Thabo Mbeki
Tanzania	3rd President	Benjamin Mkapa
Zambia	1st President	Kenneth Kaunda
