= Agostinho Mondlane =

Mozambican politician

Minister of Defence
- In office 14 March 2014 – 2015
- Preceded by: Filipe Nyusi
- Succeeded by: Athanásio Salvador M'tumuke

Deputy Minister of Defence
- In office 17 May 2007 – 14 March 2014
- Minister: Filipe Nyusi

Deputy Minister of Public Works
- In office 1994–2000
- President: Joaquim Chissano

Deputy Minister of Construction and Water
- In office 1990–1994
- President: Joaquim Chissano

Personal details
- Born: 21 November 1959 (age 66) Maputo, Portuguese Mozambique
- Party: FRELIMO
- Education: Eduardo Mondlane University; University of London (Dip)
- Profession: Economist

Agostinho Mondlane (born 21 November 1959) is a Mozambican politician who has served as Mozambique's Minister of Defence from 2014 to 2015. Previously he was Deputy Minister of Defence from 2007 to 2014.
