= Maputo Accord =

2019 peace agreement

Maputo Accord for Peace and National Reconciliation
- Type: Peace treaty
- Context: RENAMO insurgency (2013–2021)
- Signed: 6 August 2019
- Location: Maputo, Mozambique
- Mediators: Mirko Manzoni, Neha Sanghrajka, Jonathan Powell
- Signatories: Filipe Nyusi (President of Mozambique); Ossufo Momade (Leader of Renamo)
- Parties: Mozambique; RENAMO

The Maputo Accord, officially the Maputo Accord for Peace and National Reconciliation, is a peace agreement between the Government of Mozambique and Renamo, signed on 6 August 2019, with the aim of bringing definitive peace to Mozambique. The agreement was signed by the President of the Republic of Mozambique, Filipe Nyusi, and the leader of Renamo, Ossufo Momade, in Maputo, and was the result of years of negotiations. It was preceded by the signing of the Agreement on the Definitive Cessation of Military Hostilities, on 1 August 2019, in Gorongosa.

The Maputo Accord commits both parties to put an end to all political and military hostilities and to implement, in full, the legislative package on decentralisation. It further commits to the complete disarmament, demobilisation, and subsequent socio-economic reintegration of Renamo's former combatants and includes provisions for the placement of former combatants in the Mozambique Armed Defence Forces (FADM) structure and in the units of the Police of the Republic of Mozambique (PRM).

== Background ==
Peace negotiations began in December 2016 when President Filipe Nyusi indicated his willingness to engage in direct dialogue with the then leader of Renamo, the late Afonso Dhlakama, in order to resolve tensions that resulted in armed violent conflict restarting in 2013. The Principals launched the National Peace Process in March 2017 and established two commissions to support in resolving key issues related to decentralisation and military affairs (see Implementation Structures below) A Contact Group, chaired by then Swiss Ambassador to Mozambique, Mirko Manzoni (later appointed the United Nations Personal Envoy of the Secretary-General for Mozambique), was formed to coordinate the international community's support. A Secretariat was also established in early 2017 to support the process.

== Agreements ==
Over the course of the peace negotiations, President Nyusi met with Afonso Dhlakama, and his successor Ossufo Momade, on several occasions, reaching consensus on several key issues:

- Decentralisation

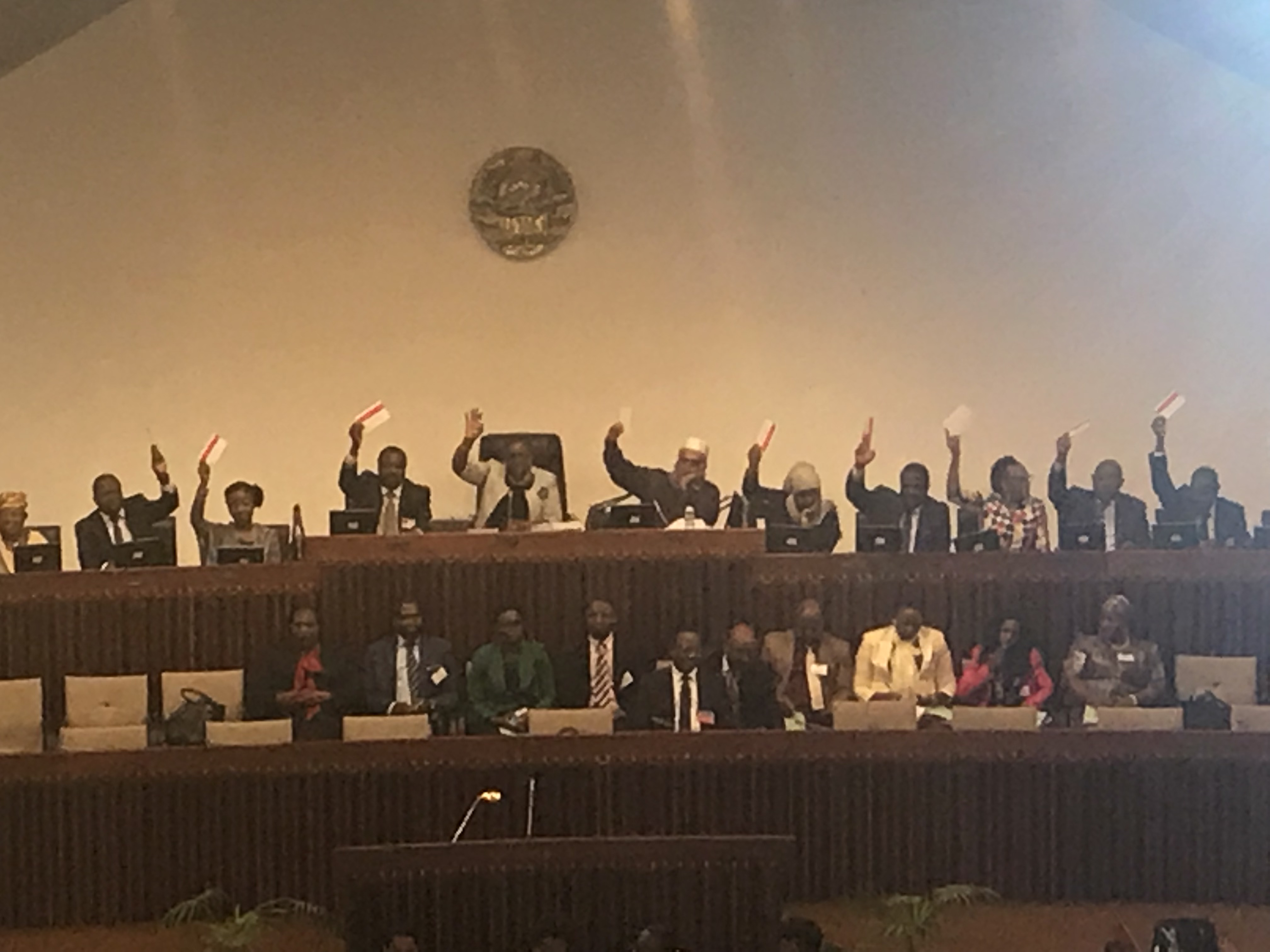
Mozambique's parliament approving a revision to the constitution to deepen decentralisation on 23 May 2018

On 23 May 2018, Mozambique's parliament unanimously approved a revision of the constitution to deepen decentralisation as part of the peace negotiations between the Government and Renamo. The bill provides administrative and financial autonomy for municipal, provincial and district bodies, while issues of national interest such as defence, security and natural resources will continue to be managed at the central level.

- Memorandum of Understanding on Military Affairs

On 6 August 2018, President Nyusi and the leader of Renamo, Ossufo Momade, signed a MoU on Military Affairs. The MoU, the first nationally and jointly agreed DDR agreement since the signing of the peace accord in 1992, outlined the road map on military affairs and the subsequent steps crucial to achieving an effective and lasting peace in Mozambique. Following the signing, President Nyusi said “the memorandum clearly outlines the roadmap for military affairs, the subsequent and decisive steps towards achieving an effective and lasting peace with regard to the disarmament, demobilisation and integration of Renamo’s armed wing”. Chief Mediator, Mirko Manzoni, who was a witness for the occasion, said that “there has been remarkable progress in the peace process and the Mozambicans should be proud”.

- Agreement on the Definitive Cessation of Military Hostilities

On 1 August 2019, President Filipe Nyusi and the leader of Renamo Ossufo Momade signed the Agreement on the Definitive Cessation of Military Hostilities in Gorongosa National Park. The agreement builds on the MoU on Military Affairs signed in August 2018, with both parties reaffirming their desire to see a future of peace and reconciliation in Mozambique and prioritization of dialogue as a means for settling grievances.

- Maputo Accord for Peace and National Reconciliation

On 6 August 2019, President Filipe Nyusi and the leader of Renamo Ossufo Momade, signed the Maputo Accord for Peace and National Reconciliation in Maputo. The occasion was witnessed by Namibia's President-in-Office of the Southern African Development Community (SADC), Hage Geingob, the President of Rwanda, Paul Kagame, Former Presidents of Mozambique (Joaquim Chissano) and Tanzania (Jakaya Kikwete), the President of the Contact Group (Mirko Manzoni) and the Representative of Sant’Egidio Community (Matteo Zuppi).

The Accord consists of the Agreement on the Definitive Cessation of Military Hostilities signed on 1 August 2019 and outlines the structures for the implementation of the Accord. The Accord commits both parties to put an end to all political and military hostilities and to implement, in full, the legislative package on decentralisation. It further commits to the complete disarmament, demobilisation and subsequent socio-economic reintegration of 5,221 former combatants of Renamo and includes provisions for the placement of former combatants in the Mozambique Armed Defence Forces (FADM) structure and in the units of the Police of the Republic of Mozambique (PRM).

DDR activities resumed in central Mozambique in June 2020 and several Renamo bases have now been closed. As of December 2021, 63% of the 5,221 former combatants have been disarmed and demobilised.

== Implementation structures ==
Since the start of the peace negotiations in 2016, the Principals – President Nyusi, and the leaders of Renamo, the late Afonso Dhlakama and his successor Ossufo Momade, have jointly agreed the implementation structures to support the different phases of the process.

Phase I:

1. A Commission on Decentralisation was established to design a proposal for a new framework for decentralisation. The commission made proposals related to the election of governors and the model of allocation of revenues among other issues. The Commission comprised members of both Government and Renamo.
2. A Commission on Military Affairs was established to work on the creation of non-partisan security services along with an effective DDR process. The Commission comprised members of both Government and Renamo.
3. A Joint Monitoring and Verification Team was established to oversee adherence to the ceasefire and investigate reports of conflicts as a confidence building measure. The JMVT comprised members of both Government and Renamo.
4. A Contact Group was formed and tasked with providing coordinated financial and technical assistance to the process. The contact group was made up of the Ambassadors of Switzerland, US, China, Norway, Botswana, Great Britain and the EU.

With a national structure in place, the process made significant advances including an indefinite truce which was announced in May 2017. This was a significant confidence building measure which built trust between both Parties. Within one year, an agreement was reached on one of the key issues of decentralisation, which led to a revision of the constitution in May 2018.

Phase 2:

With progress made on decentralisation, the peace process moved to its next phase, with the focus on military affairs. On 6 August 2018, the signing of the Memorandum of Understanding on Military Affairs, committed both Government and Renamo to advance on the central issue of disarmament, demobilisation and reintegration (DDR). The Principals agreed to a similar structure to support implementation of the agreement. It had the following key components:

1. The Military Affairs Commission (MAC) has the overall responsibility to supervise and monitor the implementation of the DDR and Placement. The MAC comprises members of both Government and Renamo.
2. The Joint Technical Group on Disarmament, Demobilization and Reintegration (JTGDDR) comprising six national experts whose role is to provide technical assistance to the Technical Group, particularly, with regards to monitoring disarmament. The International Component, comprising military experts from nine countries (Argentina, Germany, India, Ireland, Norway, Switzerland, Tanzania, United States, Zimbabwe), was formed to support the work of the JTGDDR.
3. The Joint Technical Group on Monitoring and Verification are responsible for the monitoring and verification of DDR processes.
4. The Joint Technical Group on Placement (JTGP) in the FADM, which comprises two officers from each Party, appointed by the two Principals.

Phase 3 (Post-conflict):

Following the signing of the Maputo Accord for Peace and National Reconciliation on 6 August 2019, thee Principals agreed to put in place additional structures to support the ongoing work of the DDR structures put in place during phase 2:

1. United Nations Personal Envoy of the Secretary-General (PESG) for Mozambique: On 8 July 2019, the Secretary-General of the United Nations, António Guterres, appointed Mirko Manzoni of Switzerland as his Personal Envoy for Mozambique. In this role, Manzoni provides good offices support in facilitating the continued dialogue between the Government of Mozambique and Renamo, and the implementation of the Maputo Accord. This appointment ensures continuity between the different phases of the peace process.
2. Contact Group: The PESG will continue to chair the previously established Contact Group.
3. Secretariat: The Secretariat provides technical and administrative support to the Parties in the implementation of the Agreement. The Secretariat is also responsible for providing logistical support to the whole process and manage the Basket Fund to Support the Implementation of the Agreement.
4. Board: The Board comprises the PESG, a representative of the United Nations Office of Project Services, and a representative of the donors. The Board is responsible for guiding the Secretariat in the performance of its functions.
5. Basket Fund to Support the Implementation of the Agreement: A Basket Fund was established for the international community to channel financial support to the implementation of the Maputo Accord. The Basket Fund is jointly managed by the Secretariat and UNOPS. As of June 2021, donors to the basket fund include Switzerland, Sweden, the European Union, Norway, Canada, Ireland, the United Kingdom, the Kingdom of the Netherlands, Finland, the Federal Foreign Office of Germany, and Botswana.

== Gender mainstreaming ==
The implementation of the Maputo Accord is guided by relevant national and international frameworks that cover women, peace and security interventions, such as the UN Security Council Resolution 1325 on Women, Peace and Security, adopted unanimously in 2000, and the National Action Plan (NAP) on Women, Peace and Security (2018–2022) which is aligned with the objectives of the Southern African Development Community Regional Strategy on Women, Peace and Security (2018–2022). Out of the 5,221 ex-combatants that will go through the DDR process, 257 are women.

In line with the UN Secretary General's commitment and strategy to achieving gender parity across the UN system, 48% of the staff at the Peace Process Secretariat are women, with 71% female representation on the senior management team.
