= Mozambique Air Force =

Air warfare branch of Mozambique's military

- Forca Aérea de Moçambique
- Badge of the Mozambique Air Force
- Founded: 1975; 51 years ago
- Country: Mozambique
- Branch: Air force
- Role: Aerial warfare
- Size: 4,000 personnel; 16 aircraft
- Part of: Mozambique Defence Armed Forces

Commanders
- Commander: Brigadier Candido Jose Tirano

Insignia
- Roundel

- Flag

Aircraft flown
- Fighter: MiG-21
- Helicopter: Mil Mi-8, Mil Mi-24 Aérospatiale Gazelle
- Attack helicopter: Mil Mi-25
- Reconnaissance: Paramount Mwari
- Trainer: Aero L-39
- Transport: An-26 Let L-410 Turbolet CASA/IPTN CN-235

The Mozambique Air Force (Portuguese: Forca Aérea de Moçambique; FAM) is the air force of Mozambique. From 1985 to 1990 it was known as the People's Liberation Air Force (Força Aérea Popular de Libertação; FAPL).

== Overview ==
Due to Mozambique's colonial background, the air force has a history of using former Portuguese aircraft. At its setting-up after independence in 1975 the air force was supported by Cuba and the USSR. As such, there was an influx of Soviet-built aircraft to support the government during the civil war. Following the ceasefire in 1992 and the change in government policies away from communist one-party rule towards Western-style economics and multi-party democracy, Cuban support for the air force dwindled and most of the aircraft have now fallen into disrepair. The FAM is now effectively a token force, and the defence budget has been cut down to 1.5 percent of Mozambique's Gross National Product. The number of personnel in the air force is estimated at 4,000. The air force operates out of three main bases; Beira, Nacala and Nampula.

In 2011, the Portuguese Air Force offered FAM two Cessna FTB-337, updated with the latest technology for the use in training, aeromedical evacuation and maritime surveillance operations. This is part of the permanent technical-military cooperation (CTM) programme between Portugal and Mozambique. The Portuguese-Mozambican FAM cooperation also includes other areas such as the training of pilot officers, NCOs and aviation technicians, the creation of aviation medicine and the air operations centres and also the development of search and rescue and flight safety capabilities. Currently several Mozambican officer cadets attend the Portuguese Air Force Academy.

In 2014, the Brazilian Minister of Defense disclosed his country's intention to donate 3 Embraer EMB 312 Tucano to FAM and assist in financing the purchase of 3 Embraer EMB 314 Super Tucano. In 2016, the donation deal was cancelled by the Brazilian government.

In 2014, Mozambique News and Clippings 256 (Hanlon, J) reported the following: "The Romanian company Aerostar has completed the overhaul and upgrade of eight Mozambique Air Force MiG-21 fighters, some of which had not flown operationally for more than 20 years. The package also included the overhaul of a L-39 jet trainer along with six single-seat MiG-21 fighter jets and two double-seat MiG-21 trainer aircraft, as well as a full training programme for ground staff and pilots. Two R-40S basic trainer aircraft were also delivered. Six MiG-21s are now back in Mozambique with the final two aircraft shipped from Romania in early July".

== Aircraft ==
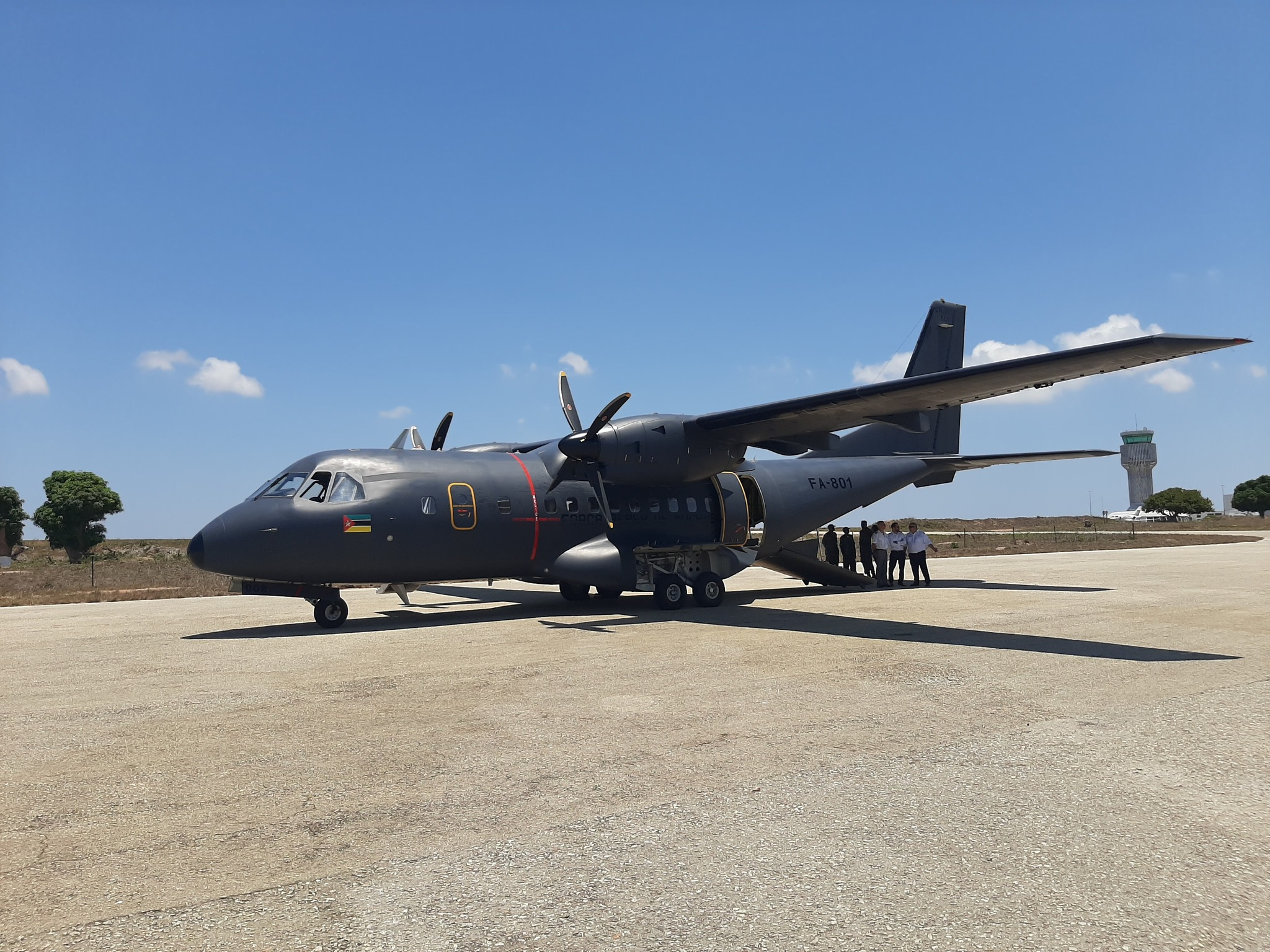
Mozambican CASA CN-235

=== Current inventory ===
| Aircraft | Origin | Type | Variant | In service | Notes |
Combat aircraft
| MiG-21 | Soviet Union | Fighter | | 8 | |
Reconnaissance
| Paramount Mwari | South Africa | Reconnaissance | | 1 | |
Transport
| Antonov An-26 | Ukraine | Transport | | 1 | |
| CASA CN-235 | Spain | Transport | | 1 | |
| L-410 Turbolet | Czech Republic | Transport | | 1 | |
Helicopters
| Mil Mi-17 | Russia | Utility | Mi-8/17 | 4 | |
| Aérospatiale Gazelle | France | Utility | SA341 | 2 | |
| Mil Mi-24 | Russia | Attack | Mi-25 | 2 | |
Trainer aircraft
| Aero L-39 | Czech Republic | Jet trainer | | 1 | |

== Ranks ==
=== Commissioned officer ranks ===
The rank insignia of commissioned officers.

| Rank group | General / flag officers | | | Senior officers | | | Junior officers |
|---|---|---|---|---|---|---|---|---|---|
| Mozambique Air Force |
| Mozambique Air Force | Coronel General | Tenente General | Major General | Coronel | Tenente Coronel | Major | Capitão | Tenente | Alferes |

=== Other ranks ===
The rank insignia of non-commissioned officers and enlisted personnel.

| Rank group | Senior NCOs | | | Junior NCOs | | Enlisted |
|---|---|---|---|---|---|---|
| Mozambique Air Force |
| Mozambique Air Force | Intendente | Primeiro-sargento | Segundo-sargento | Terceiro-sargento | Cabo | Primeiro soldado |
