= Hama Thai =

Antonio Hama Thai is an official in the Mozambican military. He has held various positions in the Mozambican government, including chief of the air force and minister for Veteran's Affairs. He speaks Ndau, Shona, Russian, Portuguese, and English.
