= Maria da Luz Guebuza =

First Lady of Mozambique

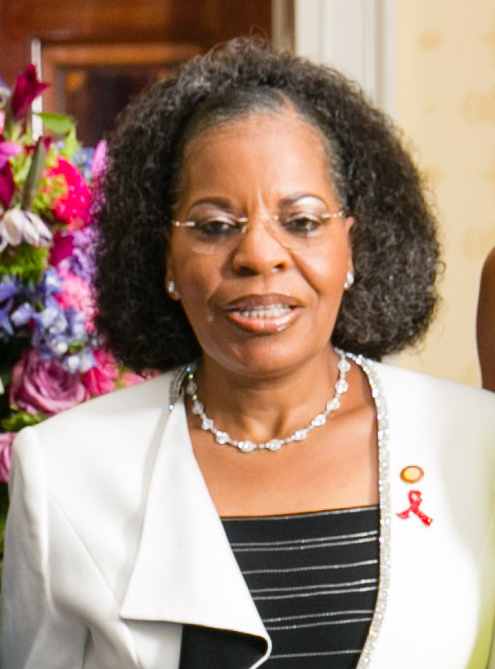
- Maria da Luz Guebuza picture at the White House

First Lady of Mozambique
- In office 2 February 2005 – 15 January 2015
- President: Armando Guebuza
- Preceded by: Marcelina Chissano
- Succeeded by: Isaura Nyusi

Personal details
- Born: 11 January 1960 (age 66) Mozambique
- Spouse: Armando Guebuza

Maria da Luz Guebuza, is an advocate of HIV and was the First Lady of Mozambique during President Armando Guebuza her husband in February 2005 until January 2015.

Guebuza, an advocate who patronize issue addressing orphaned and HIV/AIDS, launched the Unite For Children and Unite Against AIDS, a forum under the UN Initiative. She was the vice chair Lady African Synergy.

She is the patron of Global Plan under the UNAIDS since 2015.
