= MNS Pebane =

Patrol navy ship

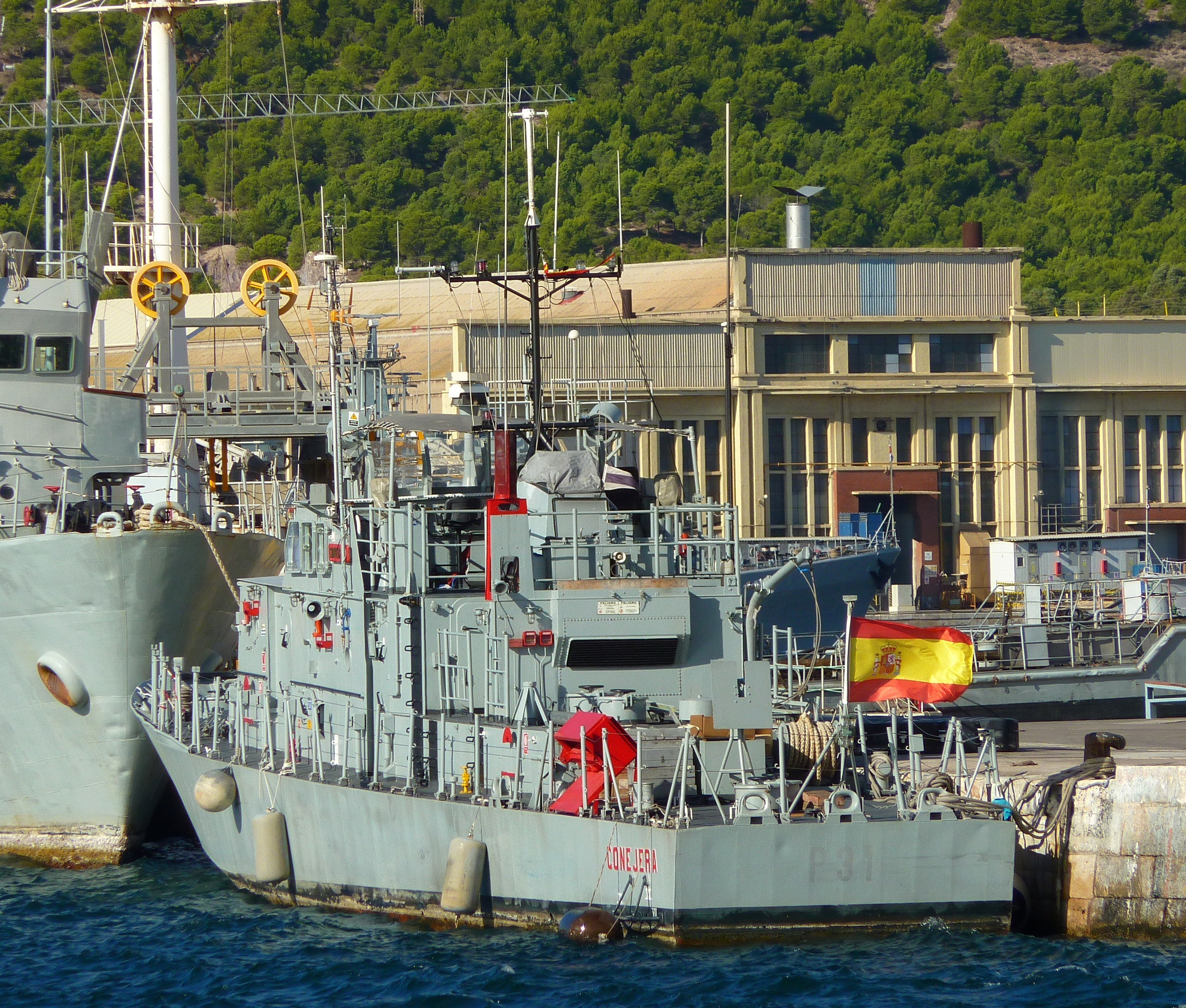
- A similar boat of Conejara class from Spain

History

Mozambique
- Name: Pebane
- Laid down: 1981
- Acquired: 2013 from Spain
- Commissioned: 2013

General characteristics
- Displacement: 85 tonnes
- Length: 32.2 m (105 ft 8 in)
- Beam: 5.6 m (18 ft 4 in)
- Draft: 1.4 m (4 ft 7 in)
- Speed: 25 knots (46 km/h; 29 mph) (max)

MNS Pebane is a patrol ship of the Conejera class of the Mozambique Navy. Commissioned in 2013, she was formerly operated by the Spanish Navy.
