= Tobias Joaquim Dai =

Mozambican politician (1950–2026)

Minister of National Defence
- In office 17 January 2000 – 26 March 2008
- Succeeded by: Filipe Nyusi

Personal details
- Born: 25 November 1950
- Died: 2 November 2026 (aged 75)

General Tobias Joaquim Dai (25 November 1950 – 2 November 2026) was a Mozambican politician who served as Minister of National Defence from 2000 to 2008. He took office on 17 January 2000 and was replaced by Filipe Nhussi on 26 March 2008.

Dai was the brother-in-law of President Armando Guebuza. He died on 2 November 2026, at the age of 75.
