= Alberto Chipande =

Mozambican politician

- Born: October 10, 1939 (age 86)
- Occupation: Mozambican politician

Alberto Joaquim Chipande (born 10 October 1939) is a Mozambican politician and a long-time leading member of FRELIMO. He was the first Defense Minister of Mozambique upon independence in 1975, remaining in that post until at least 1986 under President Samora Machel. Chipande was also a member of the Political Bureau of FRELIMO, which ran the government for 18 days in late 1986 after the death of Machel. He is also a FRELIMO member of the Assembly of the Republic from the Cabo Delgado Province.

Chipande is credited with firing the first shots of the war for independence from Portugal on 25 September 1964. When independence was achieved in 1975, he became Minister of Defense in the FRELIMO government.

Upon the creation of the Council of State, a body tasked with advising the President, Chipande was one of four members appointed to the Council by President Armando Guebuza; he and the other members of the Council were sworn in on 23 December 2005. Chipande was re-elected to the FRELIMO Central Committee at the party's November 2006 congress. He was the top-scoring candidate in that election, receiving 1,138 votes from the 1,326 delegates.
