= Filipe Nyusi =

President of Mozambique from 2015 to 2025

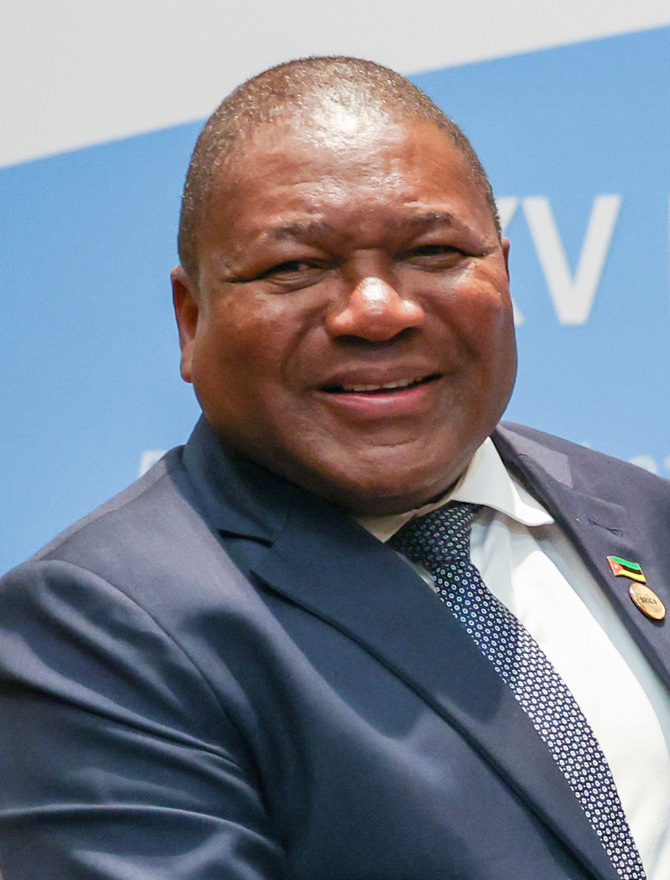
- Nyusi in 2023

4th President of Mozambique
- In office 15 January 2015 – 15 January 2025
- Prime Minister: Alberto Vaquina; Carlos Agostinho do Rosário; Adriano Maleiane
- Preceded by: Armando Guebuza
- Succeeded by: Daniel Chapo

Chairman of Southern African Development Community
- In office 17 August 2020 – 17 August 2022
- Preceded by: John Magufuli
- Succeeded by: Félix Tshisekedi

Minister of National Defence
- In office 27 March 2008 – 14 March 2014
- Preceded by: Tobias Joaquim Dai
- Succeeded by: Agostinho Mondlane

Personal details
- Born: 9 February 1959 (age 67) Mueda, Portuguese Mozambique (now Mozambique)
- Party: FRELIMO
- Spouse: Isaura Nyusi
- Children: 4
- Education: Antonín Zápotocký Military Academy (Brno, Czechoslovakia)
- Profession: Mechanical engineer
- Website: www.nyusi.org.mz

Filipe Jacinto Nyusi (Portuguese pronunciation: [fiˈlipɨ ʒɐˈsĩtu ˈɲusi]; born 9 February 1959) is a Mozambican politician who was the president of Mozambique from 2015 to 2025. He has also served as the Chairman of the Southern African Development Community from 2020 to 2022. During his time in office, President Nyusi signed multiple agreements with the main opposition parties, RENAMO.

Nyusi served as the Minister of Defense from 2008 to 2014 under Armando Guebuza. He won the 2014 and 2019 Mozambican presidential elections as the candidate of FRELIMO. Despite allegations of irregularities the President of the National Election Commission stated that "the elections were free, fair and transparent", with the Constitutional Count verifying the result on 23 December 2019. However, according to the European Union Election Observation Mission in Mozambique, Commonwealth Observer Group, and the U.S. Embassy in Mozambique, the 2019 election was characterized by instances of fraud, intimidation, and the murders of opposition leaders and election observers. The President of the National Election Commission acknowledged that the 2019 elections were marked by irregularities, stating "that is why when [the National Election Commission] announced the results, nobody heard [the National Election Commission] saying that the elections were free, fair and transparent."

During his time in office from 2015 to 2018, the poverty reduction trend observed between 2009–11 and 2015 reversed direction; the number of multidimensionally poor people increased from about 21.3 to about 22.2 million people from 2015 to 2018, with the extra million poor people mainly located in rural areas of the central provinces.

Since March 2015, at least 10 high-profile figures have been killed in Mozambique. These include leaders of opposition parties, journalists, and academics. Previously, no similarly defined high-profile leaders of opposition parties and academics were reported killed since the Peace Accord of 1992 between RENAMO and FRELIMO. Nyusi has also been accused of abuse of power; for example, some 90,000 school desks publicly delivered by Nyusi in September 2018 were manufactured by a company 50% owned by his daughter. Furthermore, court documents filed by Jean Boustani in the U.S. District Court for the Eastern District of New York in 2019 and by Iskandar Safa in The High Court of Justice in London in 2021 alleged that Nyusi received up to 2 million dollars in bribes in 2014 in connection with illegal loans (also known as "hidden debts"), which caused an economic crisis in Mozambique when he was the Minister of Defense and/or afterward.

Nyusi's time in office has been marked by the escalation of the war in Mozambique's central and northern regions. The FRELIMO government has been described as authoritarian by The Economist Intelligence Unit, Monjane et al., and Manning et al.

== Early life and career ==
Nyusi was born in Namau in Mueda District, Cabo Delgado Province, belonging to the Makonde ethnic group. Both his parents were veterans of the liberation movement, FRELIMO. At the start of the Mozambican War of Independence, he was taken across the Ruvuma River to neighboring Tanzania, where he was educated at FRELIMO Primary School in Tunduru. He pursued his secondary education at the FRELIMO school at Mariri in Cabo Delgado and Samora Machel Secondary School in Beira.

In 1973, aged 14, he joined FRELIMO and received political and military training at Nachingwea in Tanzania. In 1990, he completed his mechanical engineering degree at Antonín Zápotocký Military Academy (VAAZ) in Brno, Czechoslovakia, now the Czech Republic's University of Defense.

Before his appointment to the cabinet by President Armando Guebuza, Nyusi worked for the state-owned Mozambique Ports and Railways Authority (CFM). He became the executive director of CFM-Norte, the northern division of the company, in 1995. He joined the company's board of directors in 2007.

From 1993 to 2002, Nyusi served as the President of Clube Ferroviário de Nampula, a top-division football club based in Nampula. He is also a lecturer at the Nampula campus of the Universidade Pedagógica, a fellow of the Africa Leadership Initiative, and a member of the National Committee of Fighters of the National Liberation Struggle (Portuguese: Comité Nacional dos Combatentes da Luta de Libertação Nacional). He received further training in management in India, South Africa, Eswatini, and the United States.

== Political career ==
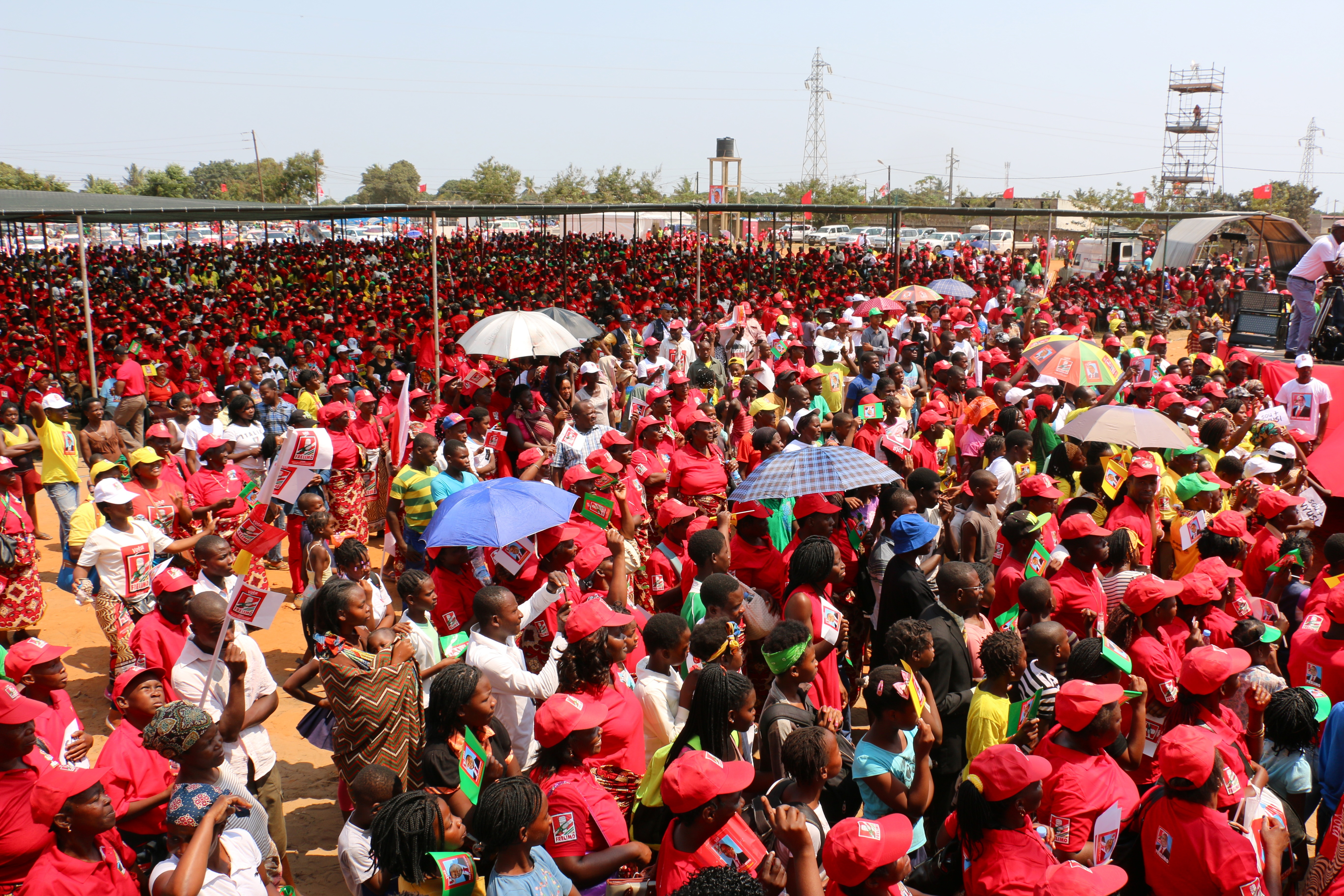
A section of the crowd at his final campaign rally in Maputo.

=== Minister of Defence ===
Nyusi took office as Minister of Defence on 27 March 2008, succeeding Tobias Joaquim Dai. Nyusi's appointment came almost exactly one year after a fire at the Malhazine armory in Maputo and the resulting explosions of munitions killed more than 100 people and destroyed 14,000 homes. A government-appointed investigative commission concluded that negligence played a role in the disaster, and Dai "was blamed by many for failing to act on time to prevent the loss of life".

In September 2012, Nyusi was elected to the Central Committee of FRELIMO, the ruling party, at its 10th congress.

=== 2014 presidential election ===
On 1 March 2014, the FRELIMO Central Committee elected Nyusi as the party's candidate for the 2014 Mozambican presidential election. In the first round of voting, he received 44% of the vote—well ahead of the second-place candidate, Luisa Diogo, but short of the majority needed to win outright. He defeated Diogo in the second round with 68% to her 31%. Although Nyusi was regarded as relatively obscure compared to the other candidates, he was most closely identified with President Guebuza. It was generally believed that the selection of Nyusi as FRELIMO's candidate would enable Guebuza, who was required to step down due to term limits, to retain substantial power after leaving office. Diogo, the defeated candidate, was associated with opposition to Guebuza within the party.

=== 2019 presidential election ===
Nyusi and his FRELIMO party won a landslide victory in an election that the opposition branded a "mega fraud". The elections were marked by assassinations and significant intimidation of prominent leaders of opposition parties and election observers. Local elections observers, civil society organizations, the Commonwealth Observer Group, and the European Union Election Observation Mission, reported significant intimidation, violence, and fraud during the election period. State resources, media, and aid for cyclone victims were extensively used in favor of FRELIMO, the ruling party, and its candidates. Nyusi, the incumbent president, was re-elected with 73% of the vote. The main opposition party RENAMO as well as the other opposition parties involved in the elections, contested the results, claiming there were numerous irregularities and accusing FRELIMO of "massive electoral fraud", including hundreds of thousands of "ghost voters". As evidence for the international community, Ossufo Momade, the president of RENAMO, transported to Europe a box filled with voting ballots that had been marked in favor of Nyusi before the start of the vote.

== Presidency (2015–2025) ==
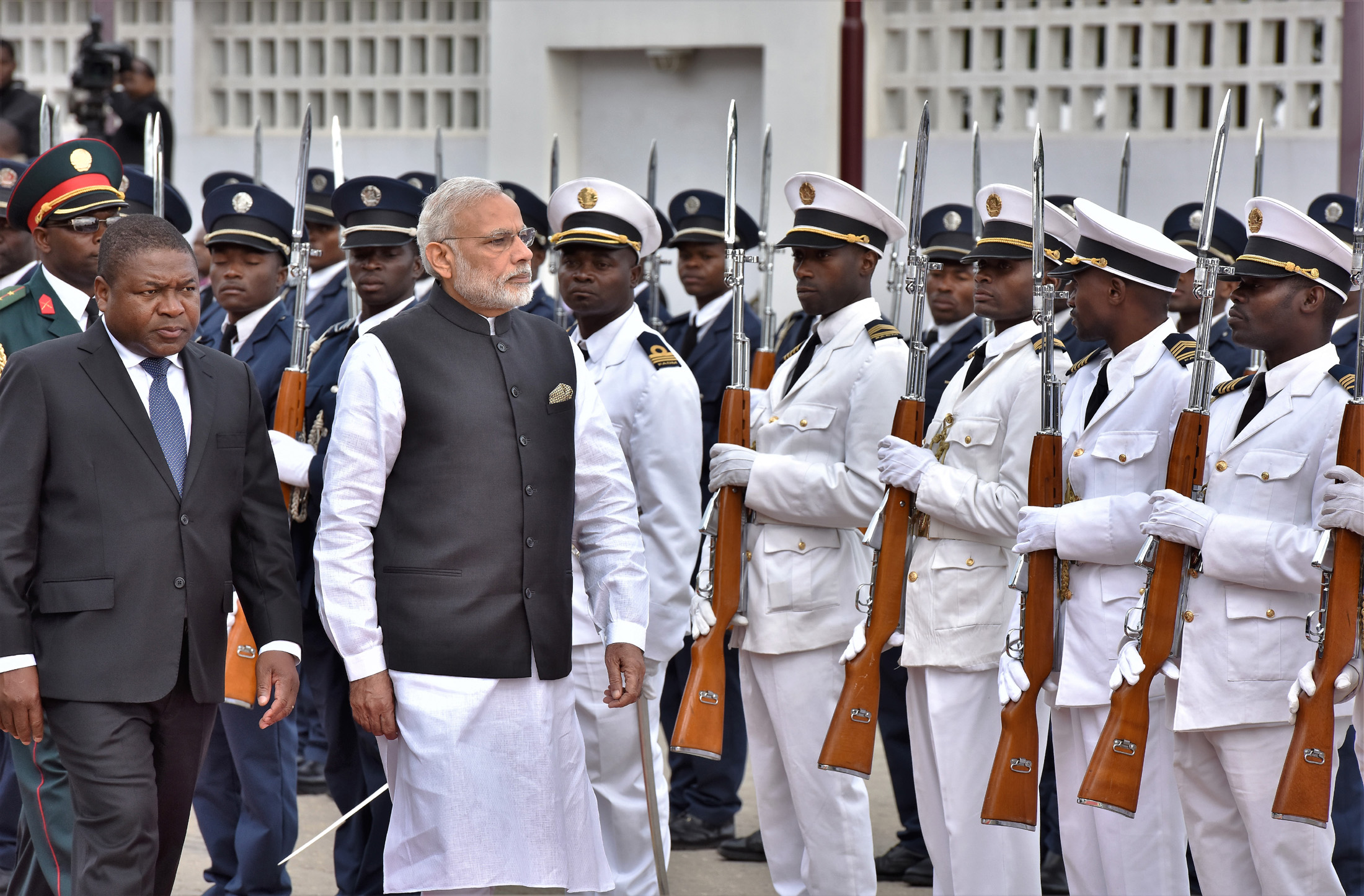
Nyusi and Indian Prime Minister Narendra Modi in Maputo, Mozambique on 7 July 2016

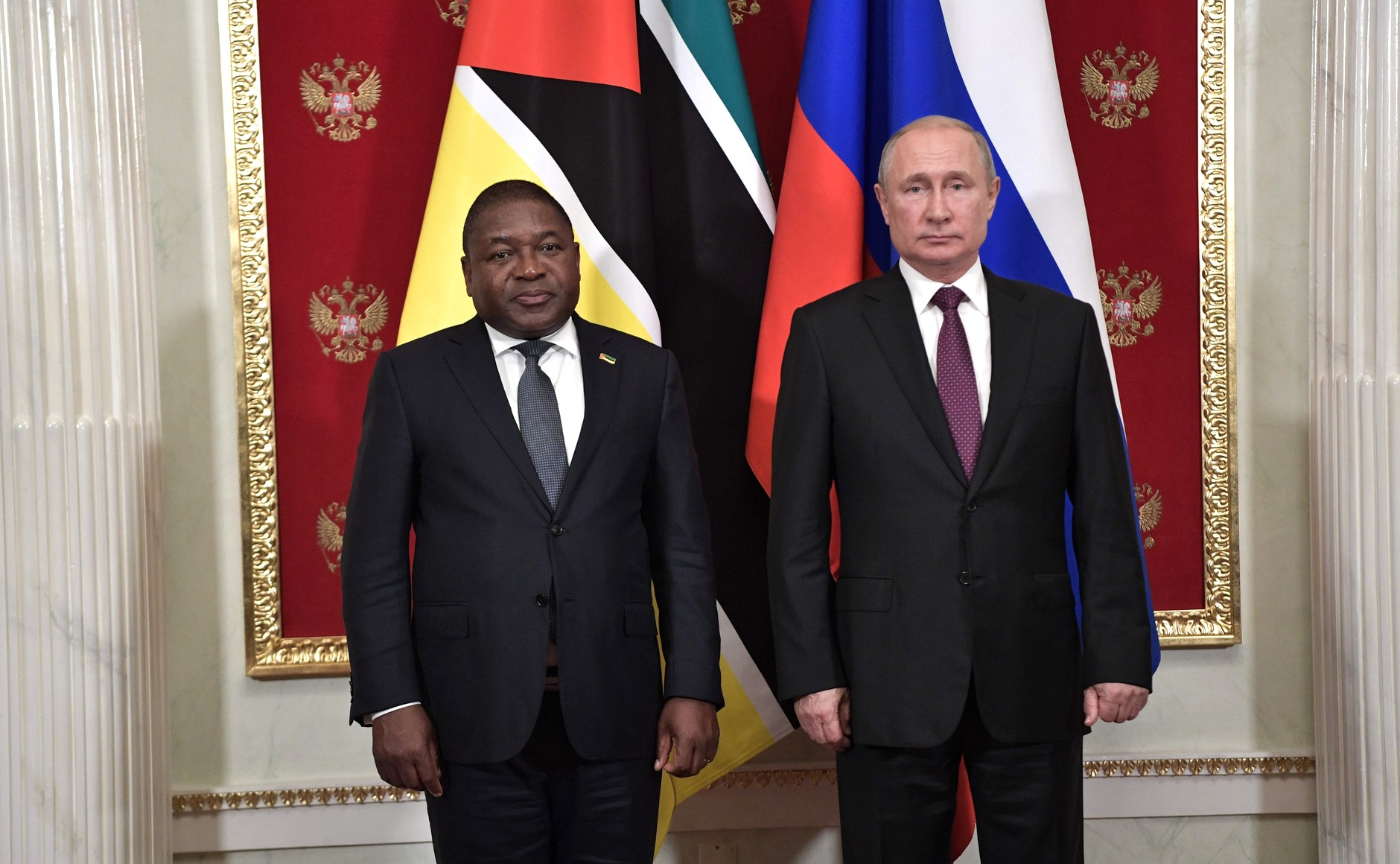
Nyusi and Russian President Vladimir Putin in Moscow, Russia, 22 August 2019

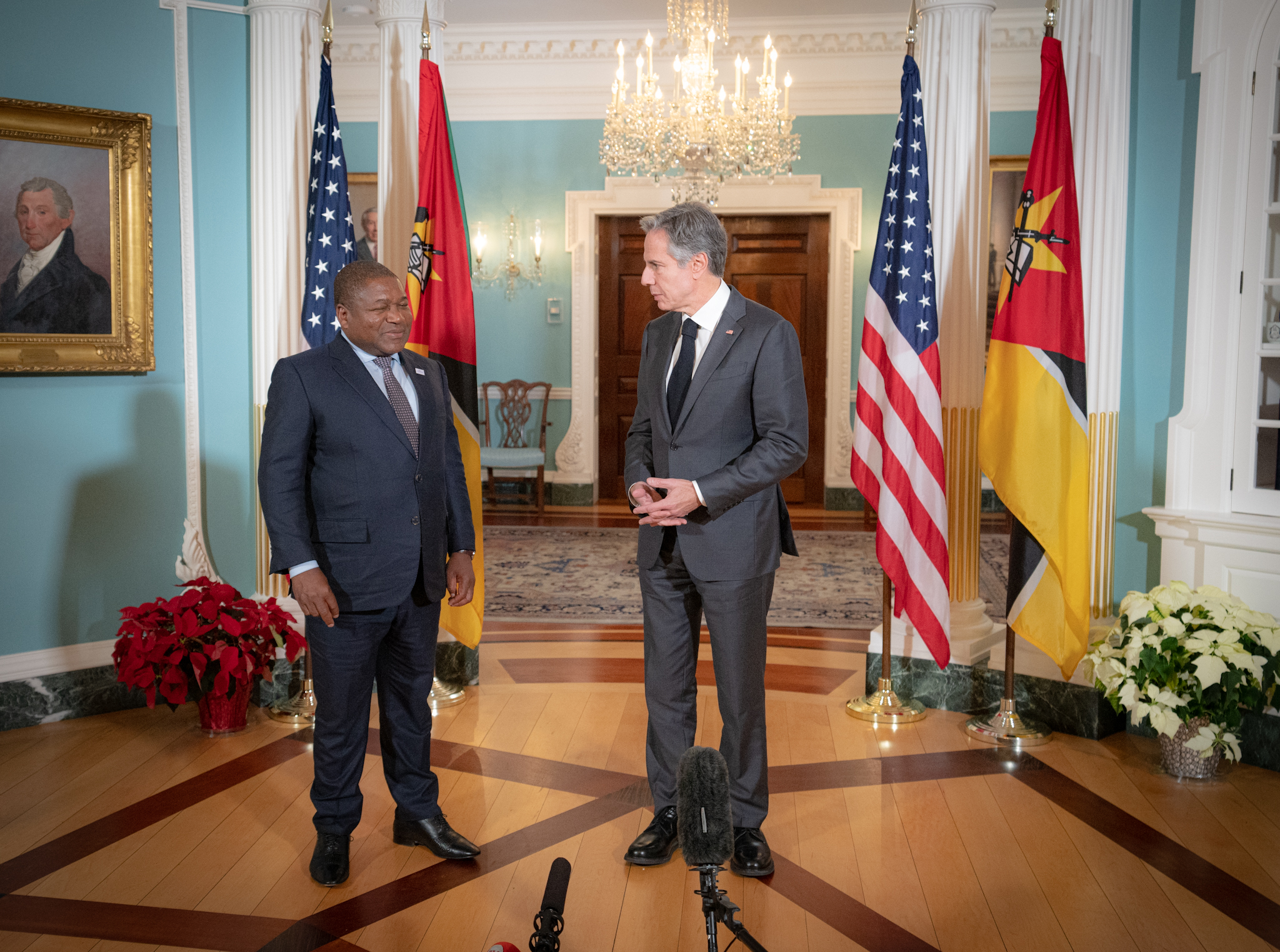
Nyusi and US Secretary of State Antony Blinken at the United States–Africa Leaders Summit in Washington on 14 December 2022

Nyusi was inaugurated for his first term as the fourth president of Mozambique on 15 January 2015 and for his second term on 15 January 2020.

During his time in office, Mozambique experienced increased poverty rates. According to the Mozambique Workers' Organization (Portuguese: Organização dos Trabalhadores de Moçambique), 23% of Mozambicans did not have any job or means to earn a living, and most of the unemployed were young. Since 2015, prominent leaders of opposition parties, academics, journalists, and leaders of civil society organizations have been assassinated throughout the country. Several assassination attempts, believed to be ordered by the Nyusi government, were made against the historical leader of opposition party RENAMO, Afonso Dhlakama, who demanded governorship in six provinces he and his party RENAMO had won in the 2014 general election. After the attempts on Dhlakama, war resumed in the traditional bastion of RENAMO in the central region of the country. The war in the central region of Mozambique continues to date. In 2017, another war started in the resource-rich northern region of the country.

=== Promoting peace and dialogue with Renamo ===
Since armed conflict re-emerged in 2013, the country has engaged in multiple efforts to secure peace. However, while these processes did not resolve the situation, they provided the platform to advance the peace process further. When the opportunity presented itself in December 2016, President Nyusi reopened dialogue with Renamo's leadership, through a nationally owned peace process that involved direct negotiations with the President of Renamo, the late Afonso Dhlakama. As part of the negotiations, President Nyusi travelled to Gorongosa to meet with Dhlakama. This was the first time in the country's history that a sitting president travelled to Renamo's stronghold.

President Nyusi's efforts culminated in the signing of the Maputo Accord for Peace and National Reconciliation in August 2019. The occasion was witnessed by Namibia's President-in-Office of the Southern African Development Community (SADC), Hage Geingob, the President of Rwanda, Paul Kagame, Former Presidents of Mozambique (Joaquim Chissano) and Tanzania (Jakaya Kikwete), the President of the Contact Group (Mirko Manzoni) and the Representative of Sant'Egidio Community (Matteo Zuppi). Since the signing of the Accord, both parties have consistently implemented agreements reached leading to the deepening of decentralisation and the implementation of the disarmament, demobilisation and reintegration (DDR) process. To date, 2,307 DDR beneficiaries (including 153 women), 44% of the total number registered as part of the DDR process, are now beginning their reintegration back into society across the country and have expressed satisfaction with the way the process is being conducted.

=== Illegal loans ===
Nyusi is accused of corruption related to an illegal loans scandal (also known as "hidden debts") that caused an economic crisis in Mozambique. Between 2013 and 2014, three state-owned companies – Ematum, Mozambique Asset Management (MAM), Proindicus – borrowed $622 million from Credit Suisse and $535 million from VTB, ostensibly for a project involving tuna fishing and maritime security. A total of $2.2 billion in hidden loans was uncovered in 2016, which triggered a collapse in the metical and a default on its debt.

In the legal actions in New York (20 November 2019) and London (15 January 2021), it was alleged that Nyusi was one of the numerous officials who received bribes, in his case at least 2 million dollars and 1 million dollars, respectively. Armando Guebuza, President of Mozambique during the time of the alleged incident, stated during a hearing with attorney general Ana Sheila Marrengula on 30 September 2020 that Nyusi should be arrested to better clarify the loans because the money from the loans that went to Ematum and MAM was intended to guarantee the defense and security of the country, and Nyusi was the Minister of Defense at the time. The independence of the judiciary in Mozambique has been questioned by experts.

Guebuza, who was instrumental in ensuring the selection of Nyusi as FRELIMO's candidate to allow Guebuza to retain influence after leaving office, is also listed as a defendant in the legal action in London in the context of the hidden loans.

=== Alleged extrajudicial killings ===
Nyusi's government has been accused of using death squads (Portuguese: esquadrões da morte) to assassinate individuals in opposition to the Mozambican government.extrajudicial assassinations of civilians by government security forces, including the Mozambique Defence Armed Forces and the Mozambique Rapid Intervention Police.

== Personal life ==
Nyusi is a member of the Makonde ethnic community. He is married to Isaura Nyusi and has four children, Jacinto, Florindo, Claudia and Angelino.

On 3 January 2022, it was announced Nyusi and his wife were in isolation after testing positive for COVID-19.

Political offices
Preceded by Armando Guebuza	President of Mozambique; 2015–2025	Succeeded by Daniel Chapo
