= List of political parties in Mozambique =

This article lists political parties in Mozambique.

Mozambique has a two-party system, which means that there are two dominant political parties, with difficulty for anybody to achieve electoral success under the banner of any other party.

== Active parties ==
=== Parties represented in parliament ===
Party	Abbr.	Established	Leader	Political position	Ideology	MPs
Liberation Front of Mozambique; Frente de Libertação de Moçambique	FRELIMO	1962	Filipe Nyusi	Left-wing	Democratic socialism	171 / 250
Optimist Party for the Development of Mozambique; Partido Otimista pelo Desenvolvimento de Moçambique	PODEMOS	2019	Hélder Mendonça	Centre-left to left-wing	Democratic socialism; Left-wing populism	43 / 250
Mozambican National Resistance; Resistência Nacional Moçambicana	RENAMO	1975	Ossufo Momade	Right-wing	National conservatism; Economic liberalism; Right-wing populism	28 / 250
Democratic Movement of Mozambique; Movimento Democrático de Moçambique	MDM	2009	Lutero Simango	Centre-right	Christian democracy	8 / 250

=== Other parties ===
- Independent Alliance of Mozambique (Aliança Independente de Moçambique or ALIMO)
- Mozambican Nationalist Movement (Movimento Nacionalista Moçambicano or MONAMO)
- National Alliance for a Free and Autonomous Mozambique (Aliança Nacional para um Moçambique Livre e Autónomo or ANAMOLA)
- National Convention Party (Partido de Convenção Nacional)
- National Unity Party (Partido de Unidade Nacional)
- Liberal Front (Frente Liberal)
- Front of Patriotic Action (Frente de Ação Patriotica)
- People's Party of Mozambique (Partido Popular de Moçambique)
- United Front of Mozambique (Frente Unida de Moçambique)
- Party for Peace, Democracy, and Development (Partido para a Paz, Democracia e Desenvolvimento)
- Independent Party of Mozambique (Partido Independente de Moçambique)
- Liberal and Democratic Party of Mozambique (Partido Liberal e Democrático de Moçambique or SOL)
- Mozambique Social Broadening Party
- National Reconciliation Party
- Party of Freedom and Solidarity
- Social Liberal and Democratic Party (Partido Social-Liberal e Democrático)
- Greens Party of Mozambique (Partido dos Verdes de Moçambique)

== Defunct parties ==
- Communist Party of Mozambique (Partido Comunista de Moçambique), was active from 1995–2009.
- National Democratic Union of Mozambique (União Democrática Nacional de Moçambique), was active from 1960–1962.
- Revolutionary Party of Mozambique (PRM; Partido Revolucionário de Moçambique), was active from 1974/76–1982.
- Mozambican National Union (UNAMO; União Nacional Moçambicana), was active from 1987–2011.

== See also ==
- Politics of Mozambique
- List of ruling political parties by country
