= 2009 Mozambican general election =

← 2004	28 October 2009	2014 →
- Presidential election
- Turnout: 44.63% (▲11.03pp)
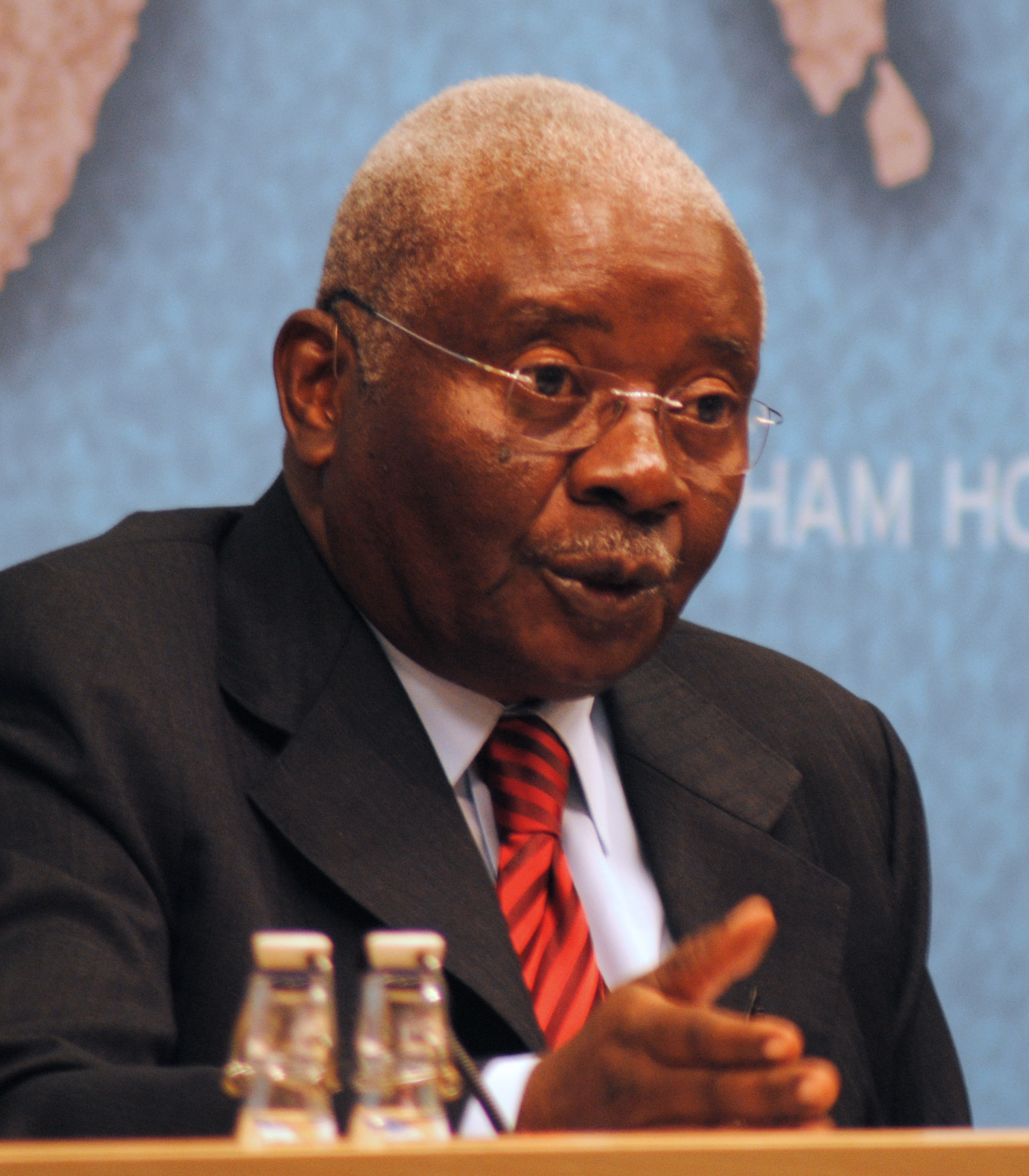

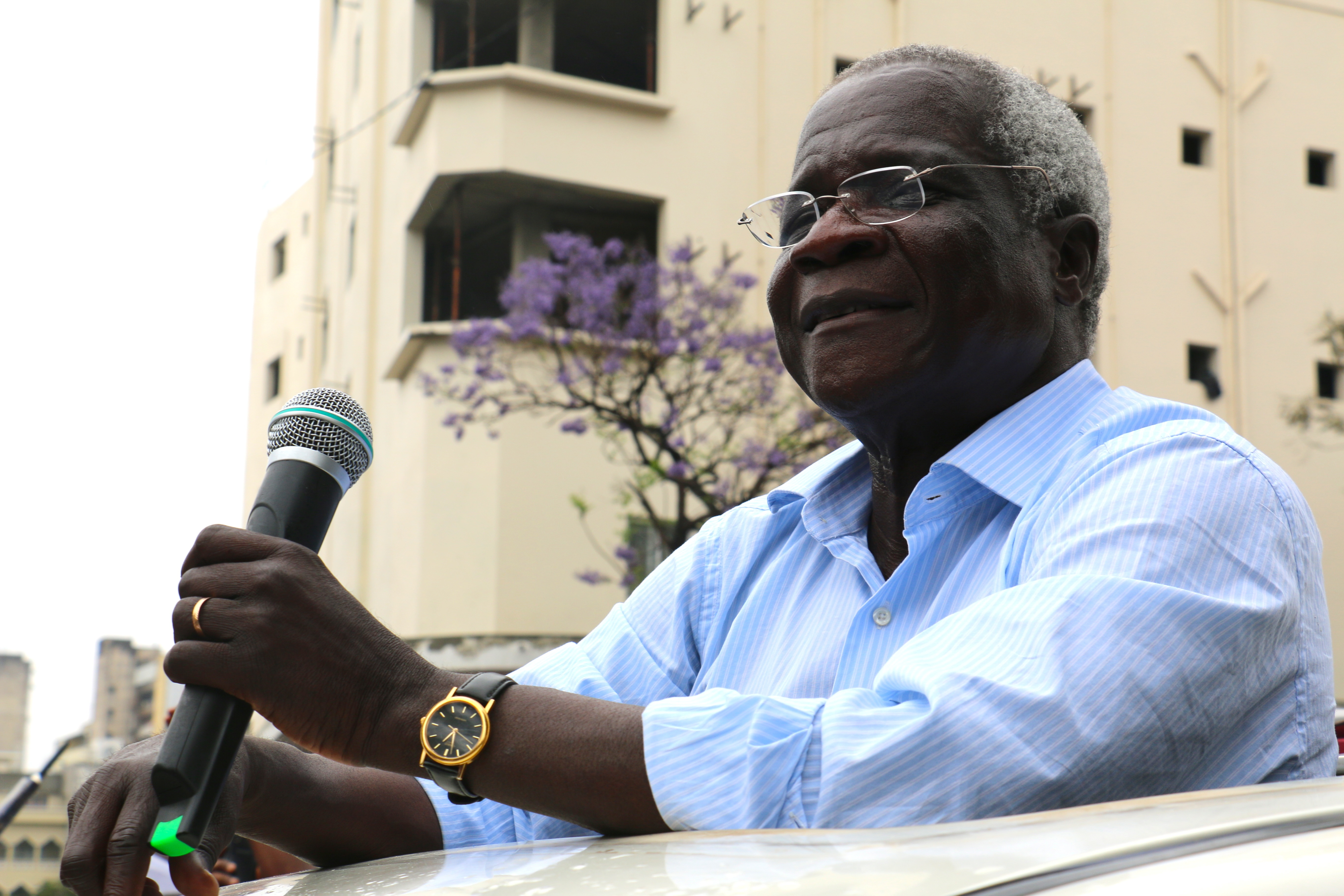

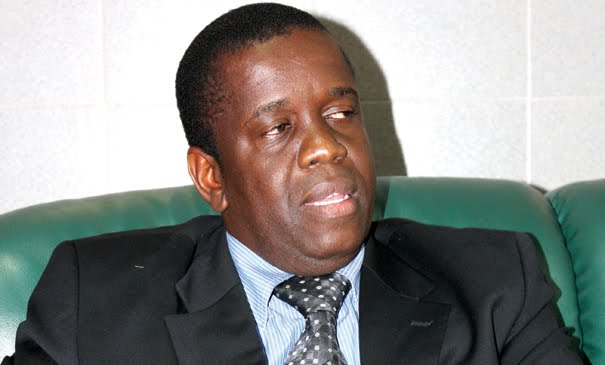
Nominee	Armando Guebuza	Afonso Dhlakama	Daviz Simango
Party	FRELIMO	RENAMO	MDM
Popular vote	2,974,627	650,679	340,579
Percentage	75.01%	16.41%	8.59%
- Parliamentary election
Party	Leader	Vote %	Seats	+/–
FRELIMO	Armando Guebuza	74.66	191	+31
RENAMO	Afonso Dhlakama	17.69	51	−39
MDM	Daviz Simango	3.93	8	New
This lists parties that won seats. See the complete results below.
- Maps
President before election
Armando Guebuza
FRELIMO
Elected President
Armando Guebuza
FRELIMO

General elections to elect the president, Assembly of the Republic, and Provincial Assemblies was held in Mozambique on 28 October 2009. Incumbent President Armando Guebuza ran for re-election as the FRELIMO candidate; he was challenged by opposition leader Afonso Dhlakama, who had stood as the RENAMO candidate in every presidential election since 1994. Also standing were Daviz Simango, the Mayor of Beira, who was a RENAMO member before founding his own party, the Democratic Movement of Mozambique (MDM), earlier in 2009.

== Campaign ==
Campaigning for the election began on 13 September 2009. There were 17 parties and two coalitions competing in the parliamentary election. Provincial assemblies were also at stake in the election. Citing problems in the papers submitted by the MDM when it filed to run, the National Elections Commission barred it from contesting the parliamentary election in nine out of 13 regions. Simango, who insisted there were no problems with the papers, was allowed to stand as a presidential candidate.

Prior to the election, Guebuza was heavily favored to win another term, and RENAMO, mired in a bitter feud with Simango and the MDM, was thought to have been seriously weakened since the previous election, held in 2004. On 14 October 2009, 20 minor parties backed Simango's candidacy. The Independent Party of Mozambique (PIMO), another minor party, chose to support Guebuza.

On the last day of campaigning, 25 October, each of the three main candidates held major rallies. At FRELIMO's rally in Nampula, Guebuza stressed a commitment to fighting poverty and working for "national unity, peace and development". Dhlakama concluded his campaign with rallies in Maputo, and he criticized the predominant role of FRELIMO in society: "Everything is mixed together today in Mozambique. The party, the police, schools, roads, journalists—everything has to be through FRELIMO. This has to stop." Simango, meanwhile, held his last rally in Beira, declaring that it was time to "end the games, end the abuses"; he pointed to the problems of unemployment and lack of medicine in hospitals when urging his supporters to turn out for the vote.

Voting at central Maputo's Polana secondary school on election day, Dklahama said that if he lost the election he would not run for president again. He also called for a high turnout, while stressing the importance of respecting the results and avoiding a post-election dispute.

== Results ==
According to provisional results announced on 2 November, incumbent president Guebuza won a landslide victory with about 75% of the vote. Turnout was estimated at 42%. SADC observers said the election result was "a true reflection of the will of the people of Mozambique". Opposition party RENAMO was less content with the electoral conduct, demanding that the election be annulled. According to RENAMO spokesperson Ivone Soares, FRELIMO supporters stuffed ballot boxes with multiple votes and were assisted in doing so by the electoral commission, which provided them with additional ballot papers. A FRELIMO spokesperson, Edson Macuacua, dismissed the allegations, asserting that the election was free and fair and characterizing RENAMO as "lost and desperate".

On 11 November, the National Elections Commission officially announced that Guebuza had won the election with 75% of the vote; Dhlakama and Simango trailed with 16.5% and 8.6% respectively. Results for the parliamentary election were also announced, showing that FRELIMO had won 191 seats, followed by RENAMO with 51 seats and eight for the MDM. The Constitutional Council confirmed the results on 28 December. Continuing to allege fraud, Dhlakama said that RENAMO would boycott the opening of parliament.

After the newly elected deputies were sworn in, they elected Veronica Macamo, a FRELIMO Deputy, as president of the Assembly of the Republic in January 2010. Macamo was the only candidate for the position.

=== President ===
Candidate	Party	Votes	%
Armando Guebuza	FRELIMO	2,974,627	75.01
Afonso Dhlakama	RENAMO	650,679	16.41
Daviz Simango	Democratic Movement of Mozambique	340,579	8.59
Total		3,965,885	100.00
Valid votes		3,965,885	90.01
Invalid votes		175,553	3.98
Blank votes		264,655	6.01
Total votes		4,406,093	100.00
Registered voters/turnout		9,871,949	44.63
Source: CNE, CNE

=== Assembly ===
Party	Votes	%	Seats	+/–
FRELIMO	2,907,335	74.66	191	+31
RENAMO	688,782	17.69	51	–39
Democratic Movement of Mozambique	152,836	3.93	8	New
Party for Liberty and Development	26,929	0.69	0	New
Party for Peace, Democracy, and Development	22,410	0.58	0	0
Party of Greens of Mozambique	19,577	0.50	0	0
Democratic Alliance of Veterans for Development	17,275	0.44	0	New
Party of Freedom and Solidarity	16,626	0.43	0	0
Independent Alliance of Mozambique	14,959	0.38	0	–
Electoral Union Coalition	6,786	0.17	0	New
National Reconciliation Party	5,610	0.14	0	0
Ecological Party-Land Movement	5,267	0.14	0	0
Patriotic Movement for Democracy	2,433	0.06	0	New
Union of Mozambican Democrats	2,190	0.06	0	New
Union for Change	1,641	0.04	0	New
Labour Party	1,239	0.03	0	0
National Party of Workers and Peasants	852	0.02	0	New
People's Democratic Party	712	0.02	0	0
Social Democratic Reconciliation Party	399	0.01	0	New
Total	3,893,858	100.00	250	0
Valid votes	3,893,858	88.75		
Invalid votes	143,893	3.28		
Blank votes	349,499	7.97		
Total votes	4,387,250	100.00		
Registered voters/turnout	9,871,949	44.44		
Source: CNE, CNE

=== Provincial elections ===
Province	FRELIMO	RENAMO	MDM
Cabo Delgado Province	73	8	0
Gaza Province	All	0	0
Inhambane Province	All	0	0
Manica Province	61	19	0
Maputo City			
Maputo Province	75	5	0
Nampula	78	11	2
Niassa	66	2	2
Sofala	59	1	20
Tete	75	5	0
Zambezia	57	31	0
Source allafrica.com
