= RENAMO insurgency (2013–2021) =

Guerrilla war in Mozambique

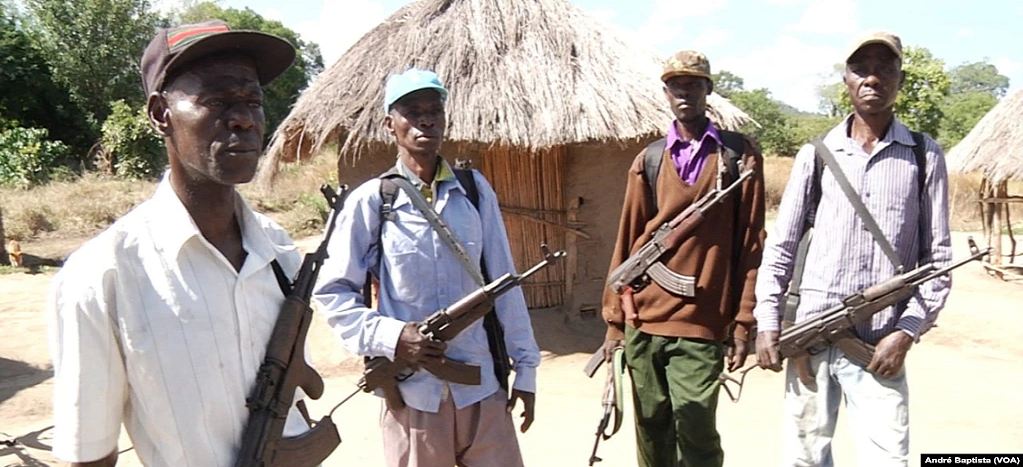
- RMJ militants, including Mariano Nhongo (far left)
Date	First phase: April 2013 – September 2014; Second phase: March 2015 – May 2018; RMJ phase: August 2019 – December 2021
Location	Mozambique
Result	Peace agreement signed between opposing factions on 1 August 2019: Most RENAMO rebels lay down arms soon afterward; A splinter faction, the RENAMO Military Junta (RMJ), continued its insurgency until 2021

Belligerents
Government of Mozambique: FRELIMO	RENAMO (until 2019); RENAMO Military Junta (from 2019)

Commanders and leaders
Armando Guebuza (until 2015); Filipe Nyusi (from 2019)	Afonso Dhlakama (1979–2018); Ossufo Momade (2018–2019); Mariano Nhongo † (2019–2021)

Strength
Unknown	500 (RMJ, self claim)

Casualties and losses
- 200+ total killed (as of 2015); 15,000 displaced (2016)

The RENAMO insurgency was a guerrilla campaign by militants of the RENAMO party and one of its splinter factions in Mozambique. The insurgency was widely considered to be an aftershock of the Mozambican Civil War; it resulted in renewed tensions between RENAMO and Mozambique's ruling FRELIMO coalition over charges of state corruption and the disputed results of the 2014 general elections.

A ceasefire was announced between the government and the rebels in September 2014. However, renewed tensions sparked violence in mid-2015.

On 1 August 2019, President Filipe Nyusi and RENAMO leader Ossufo Momade signed a peace agreement at RENAMO's remote military base in the Gorongosa mountains in order to bring an end to hostilities. Most remaining RENAMO fighters afterward surrendered their weapons. Another peace agreement was then signed by Nyusi and Momade in Maputo's Peace Square on 6 August 2019. However, a splinter faction known as the "RENAMO Military Junta" (RMJ) continued its insurgency. By February 2021, most of the RMJ had surrendered, although a few holdouts remained in rural areas without launching further attacks. RMJ ceased to exist in December 2021, when its last members surrendered.

== Background ==
The Resistência Nacional Moçambicana (RENAMO) was formed in 1976 following Mozambican independence from Portugal and incorporated a number of diverse recruits brought together by their opposition to the country's new Marxist FRELIMO government, including disgruntled former colonial troops and deserters from the post-independence army and security forces. They were welded into a cohesive fighting unit by the Rhodesian Central Intelligence Organisation and Special Air Service, and RENAMO's numbers had swelled to about 2,000 by late 1979. Militants acted as scouts for Rhodesian military units carrying raids into Mozambique, launched attacks on major settlements, and sabotaged infrastructure from October 1979 onwards. RENAMO's political wing also operated a radio station, the Voice of Free Africa, broadcasting anti-communist propaganda from Rhodesia. The fighting escalated sharply between 1982 and 1984, during which RENAMO attacked and destroyed lines of communication, the road and rail network, and vital economic infrastructure. It merged during this period with the Revolutionary Party of Mozambique (PRM), another anti-FRELIMO militant group, and received training and support from South Africa's apartheid government. What began as a decidedly low-intensity conflict escalated into an effective insurgency, then a major civil war that killed up to a million Mozambicans and created a major refugee situation in southern Africa. By the late 1980s, RENAMO controlled an estimated 25% of Mozambique's area, especially around the Manica, Sofala, and Zambezia provinces.

The end of the Cold War and FRELIMO's acceding to RENAMO demands for multi-party democracy in 1990 ensured a ceasefire and bilateral negotiations sponsored by Western governments. Both parties formally made peace with the Rome General Peace Accords on 4 October 1992. Large numbers of combatants on both sides were demobilized accordingly. An election held in 1994 returned approximately 33.7% of the votes for RENAMO's presidential candidate Afonso Dhlakama. Dhlakama also carried 112 parliamentary seats and won a decisive majority in five of the country's eleven provinces. The election results, which were closely monitored by the United Nations, were declared free and fair.

During the second round of general elections scheduled for December 1999, in which FRELIMO secured a much narrower majority of the popular vote, RENAMO contested the electoral processes and alleged widespread voter fraud. Throughout 2000 a number of pro-RENAMO demonstrations were held in major Mozambican cities such as Maputo and Beira. The government ruled the demonstrations illegal, and security forces killed some of the protestors. In Montepuez, this resulted in street clashes between protestors and the police which left a hundred dead. Another eighty people died in police custody. Some protestors began vandalizing state property and occupying official buildings, while a mob of FRELIMO supporters led by veterans of the civil war retaliated by destroying RENAMO's headquarters. The tense political climate was further shaken when unidentified gunmen raided a police station in Nampula, killing five. FRELIMO claimed that RENAMO dissidents were responsible. In January 2002 the government placed several RENAMO supporters on trial for armed insurrection.

The outbreak of violence in 2000 and the contested elections of 1999, as well as the appointment of new provincial governors, all of whom were known FRELIMO partisans, resulted in the continued breakdown of relations between the two formerly belligerent parties.

Since then, support for RENAMO has waned in Mozambique elections. Afonso Dhlakama in October 2012 began retraining ageing veterans demanding "a new political order". This followed complaints that the political system was not sufficiently inclusive and that the proceeds of economic development were not being shared fairly. RENAMO turned to arms once again, citing fears for the safety of its leader.

== Timeline ==
=== Resurgence (April 2013–August 2014) ===
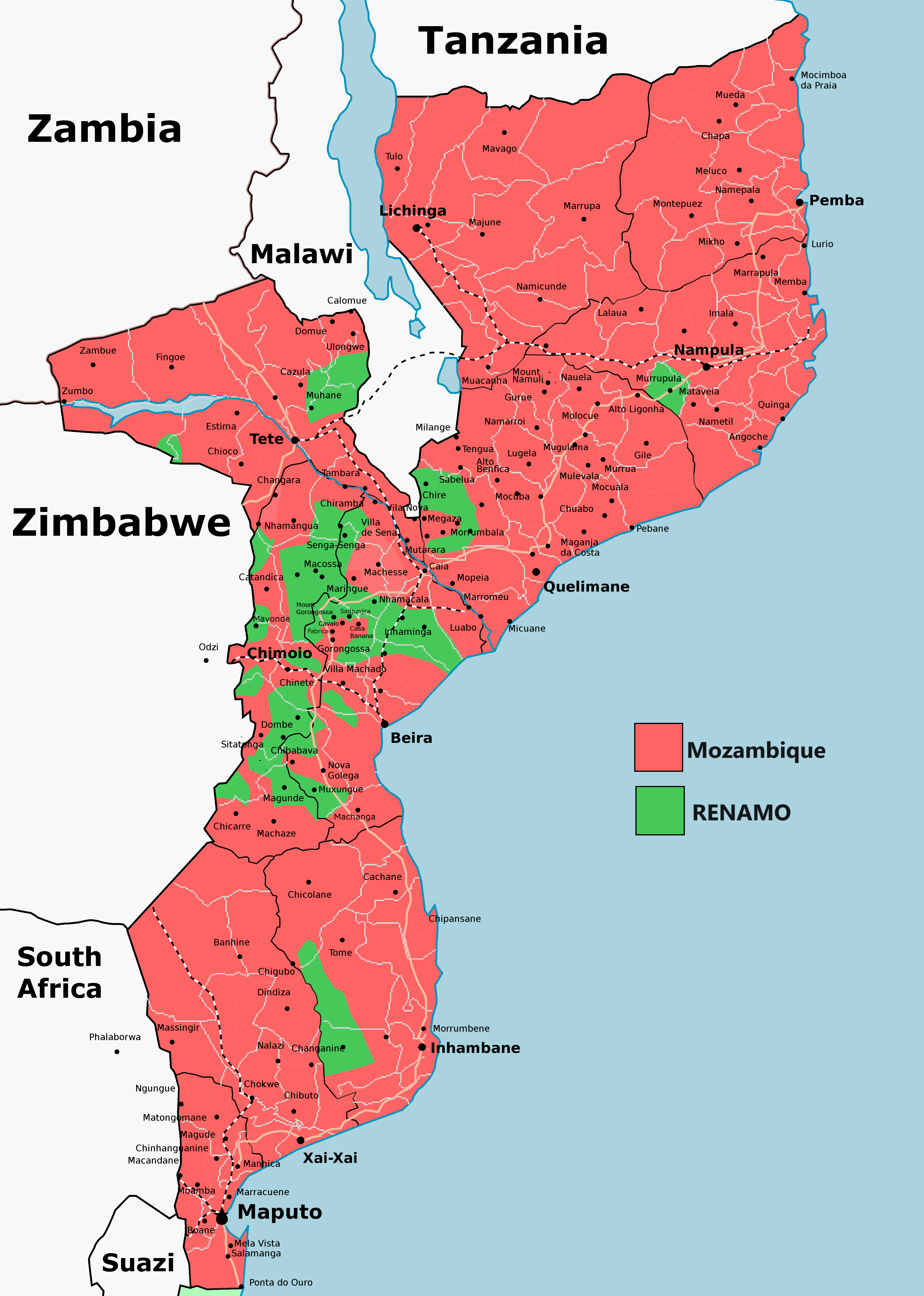
Map of RENAMO presence in 2014

The activity of RENAMO resurged in April 2013, when armed clashes broke out with a RENAMO attack on a police station in Muxungue.

RENAMO participated in two clashes in August 2013, resulting in the deaths of 36 Mozambique soldiers and policemen according to RENAMOs announcement; local media figures were put significantly lower in comparison, reporting just 2 deaths.

On 21 October 2013 a government raid on the RENAMO base in Sofala Province resulted in one rebel death.

In January 2014, 1 person was killed and five injured in a Muxungue ambush by RENAMO. In early January 2014, additional six members of the Mozambican Defense and Security Force in Homoine district.

RENAMO members were suspected of killing four policemen and wounding five others in Mozambique's district of Gorongosa in early March 2014.

A "unilateral ceasefire", decreed by its leader Afonso Dhlakama, was announced by RENAMO on 7 May 2014.

On 15 May 2014 two policemen were killed by RENAMO in the Morutane region of Mocuba district (Zambezia province).

On 31 May 2014 and 1 June 2014 RENAMO claimed to have killed 20 soldiers in the Muxungue region. On 2 June 2014 Antonio Muchanga (the spokesman of the organization) claimed that "As of today, there are no guarantees of movement". RENAMO's explanation for scrapping the truce was a claim that the government was massing forces in the Sofala district of Gorongosa in order to assassinate Dhlakama, who was living in a base on the slopes of the Gorongosa mountain range.

On 4 June 2014 the RENAMO rebel movement killed 3 people, attacking a convoy of vehicles on the main north-south highway. Earlier that week 7 people were injured at the same location by RENAMO in similar circumstances.

=== Ceasefire (August 2014–February 2015) ===
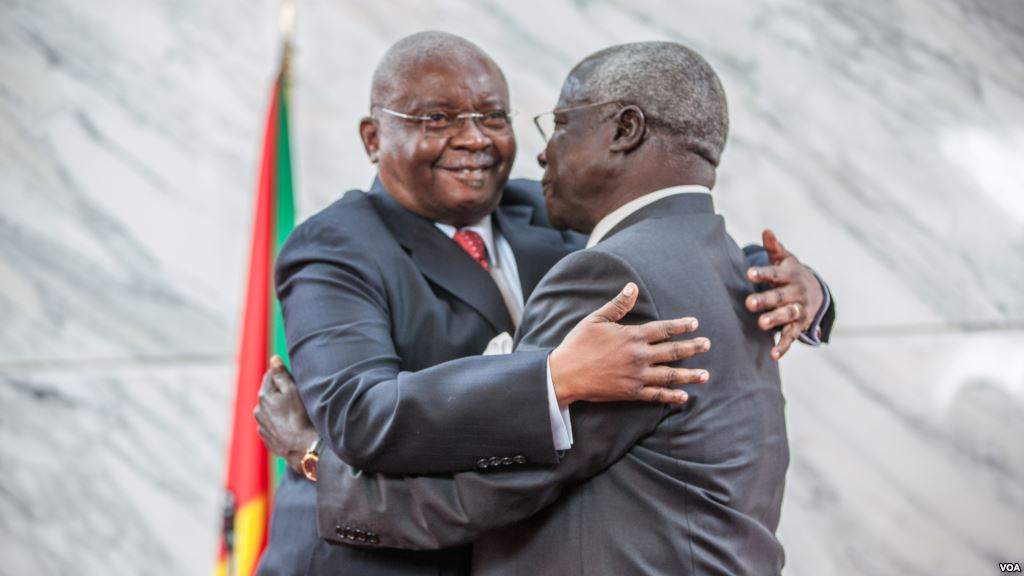
Afonso Dhlakama (right) ratifying the 2014 peace deal with Mozambique's President Armando Guebuza

The government and the RENAMO rebels signed a ceasefire on 25 August 2014. This followed almost a year of negotiations and the government release of rebels captured in fighting in the week beforehand, coming into effect at 22:00 (CAT) on that day. Simon Macuiane, the rebels' chief negotiator, called it an "important step towards national reconciliation... and a durable peace." The ceasefire was seen as part of a wider attempt to bring peace to the country ahead of elections scheduled for October 2014.

On 5 September, Mozambican President Armando Guebuza signed a peace deal with ex-rebel leader Afonso Dhlakama, who emerged from two years in hiding to sign the deal in the capital, Maputo.

Following the September 2014 agreement, provincial elections were held in Mozambique on 15 October 2014 with their results sparking a renewed political crisis in the country - Renamo at first mocked the official election results, alleging that the results released by the provincial elections commissions are "adulterated" and do not reflect what really occurred at the polling stations. In a consequent Beira conference, Renamo declared that it had won 139 seats in the seven northern and central provinces to just 34 for the ruling Frelimo Party and 14 for the Mozambique Democratic Movement. It added that it would not accept any results which did not agree with its own count. The official results of the provincial elections were completely different, resulting in a political crisis.

=== Renewed tensions and clashes (March 2015–May 2018) ===
In early March 2015, a leading legal expert in Mozambique, named Gilles Cistic, was murdered in central Maputo. Cistac had previously endorsed a proposal by RENAMO to create semi-autonomous provinces, an issue upon which the ruling FRELIMO party is divided. Following the murder, at a rally on 6 March 2015 RENAMO leader Afonso Dhlakama accused FRELIMO of committing the murder and threatened to bypass parliamentary debate and start ruling the autonomous provinces he claims for RENAMO.

On 14 June 2015 Dhlakama's forces perpetrated an ambush on Mozambican troops, claiming to kill as many as 35 government soldiers, bringing the cease-fire to a halt. According to the spokesperson for the General Command of the Mozambican police, Pedro Cossa, two policemen were wounded in the ambush, one of whom died on the way to the hospital.

In December 2015, Dhlakama once again threatened to seize control of six northern and central provinces in March 2016: Sofala, Tete, Niassa, Manica, Zambezia, and Nampula.

On 20 January 2016 the Secretary-General of RENAMO, Manuel Bissopo, was injured in a shootout, where his bodyguard died.

The Mozambican government reopened peace talks with RENAMO in July 2016, only to cancel them in the wake of escalating violence and an impasse over the status of the six northern and central provinces, which Dhlakama insisted were under his party's control. RENAMO responded by intensifying its guerrilla campaign, targeting police outposts and rail lines. Rail traffic in Sofala Province was temporarily suspended due to the fighting.

On 12 August 2016 RENAMO rebels launched a major attack in Morrumbala District, destroying a clinic and freeing some prisoners held at the local police station. Mozambican security forces retaliated with raids on the party's Morrumbala headquarters and a suspected insurgent base camp.

On the morning of 19 December 2016 six insurgents attacked the Inhazonia open prison in Báruè District and released 48 prisoners. RENAMO also attacked a health unit in the Honda administrative post, where its forces stole medical supplies.

Around late December 2016, RENAMO announced that it had reached a truce with the FRELIMO government. On 3 January 2017 Dhlakama publicly stated that the truce had been extended for another two months. This allowed schools and roads closed due to the insurgency to be reopened.

On 4 May 2017 Dhlakama announced that he had reached an agreement with the government to extend the truce indefinitely and that RENAMO militia forces would be vacating the government buildings that they had been occupying by the end of June.

On 3 May 2018 Afonso Dhlakama, the longtime and influential leader of RENAMO, died after suffering a heart attack. It is unknown if his ceasefire plan will go into effect. Due to Dhlakma's strong influence in the organization, it was also called into question if RENAMO could ever recover. The next month on 14 June 2018 Ossufo Momade, the interim leader of RENAMO, went into hiding.

=== Peace deal and rebel splintering ===
On 1 August 2019 President Filipe Nyusi and RENAMO leader Ossufo Momade signed a peace agreement bringing an end to the six-year conflict. The signing of the peace took place at RENAMO's remote military base in the Gorongosa mountains. After the agreement was signed, most RENAMO fighters surrendered their weapons. Momade told the Associated Press that "we will no longer commit the mistakes of the past. […] We are for a humanized and dignified reintegration, and we want the international community to help make that a reality." Nyusi and Momade signed another peace deal in Maputo's Peace Square on 6 August 2019.

However, parts of RENAMO strongly disagreed with the deal. Led by General Mariano Nhongo, this faction was also opposed to Momade and refused to lay down arms. Calling itself the "RENAMO Military Junta" (RMJ), the group claimed to include 500 fighters and to control eleven bases. The RMJ demanded that the Mozambican government deal directly with them, circumventing Momade, and continued to launch attacks until this demand was met. In the following years, the RMJ continued to operate in Sofala and Manica Provinces, but one of its key leaders, Andre Matsangaissa Junior, surrendered to the government in late 2020. By February 2021, most RMJ fighters and commanders had laid down weapons, and RMJ attacks had ceased. Momade urged the few remaining RMJ holdouts (including Nhongo) to abandon the bush and rejoin RENAMO's main faction in March 2021. In early May, unknown gunmen, believed to be supporters of the RMJ, shot at the residence of an administrative post head Americo Nfumane at Capirizanje, Moatize District. The attackers left a letter at the scene denouncing Momade. Nfumane was not injured in the attack. In late May, three RMJ members surrendered to the government in Manica Province. They claimed that the RMJ had suffered mass desertions, citing the example of the splinter group's former stronghold at Gorongosa, which had been reduced to seven militants.

In July 2021, RMJ leader Mariano Nhongo reaffirmed that he was ready for peace talks under the condition of excluding the RENAMO main faction. Despite his group's gradual demise, he also boasted "The [RENAMO] military junta still exists, and it will always exist". In early October, government forces discovered and seized Nhongo's hideout in the Zove hamlet deep at Inhaminga. On 11 October 2021 the RMJ leader was shot dead in a firefight with Mozambican security forces in Cheringoma District. According to Bernadino Rafael, General Commander of the Mozambican police force, Nhongo's force had attacked a patrol in the bush at Njovo. He died alongside one of his main lieutenants, Wulawucama. In December 2021, United Nations envoy Mirko Manzoni declared that the last remnant group of the RMJ, comprising 24 militants, had joined the "Demobilization, Disarmament and Reintegration" (DDR) program. The group had laid down its weapons at Murrupula, Nampula Province.

== United Nations response ==
According to the United Nations High Commissioner for Refugees (UNHCR), up to 12,000 Mozambicans were driven into exile as a result of the insurgency between the years 2013 and 2016 respectively. UNHCR is currently monitoring temporary camps established for Mozambican refugees in Malawi, although it has cited insufficient funds and food supplies as potentially serious problems.
