= 2014 Mozambican general election =

← 2009	15 October 2014	2019 →
- Presidential election
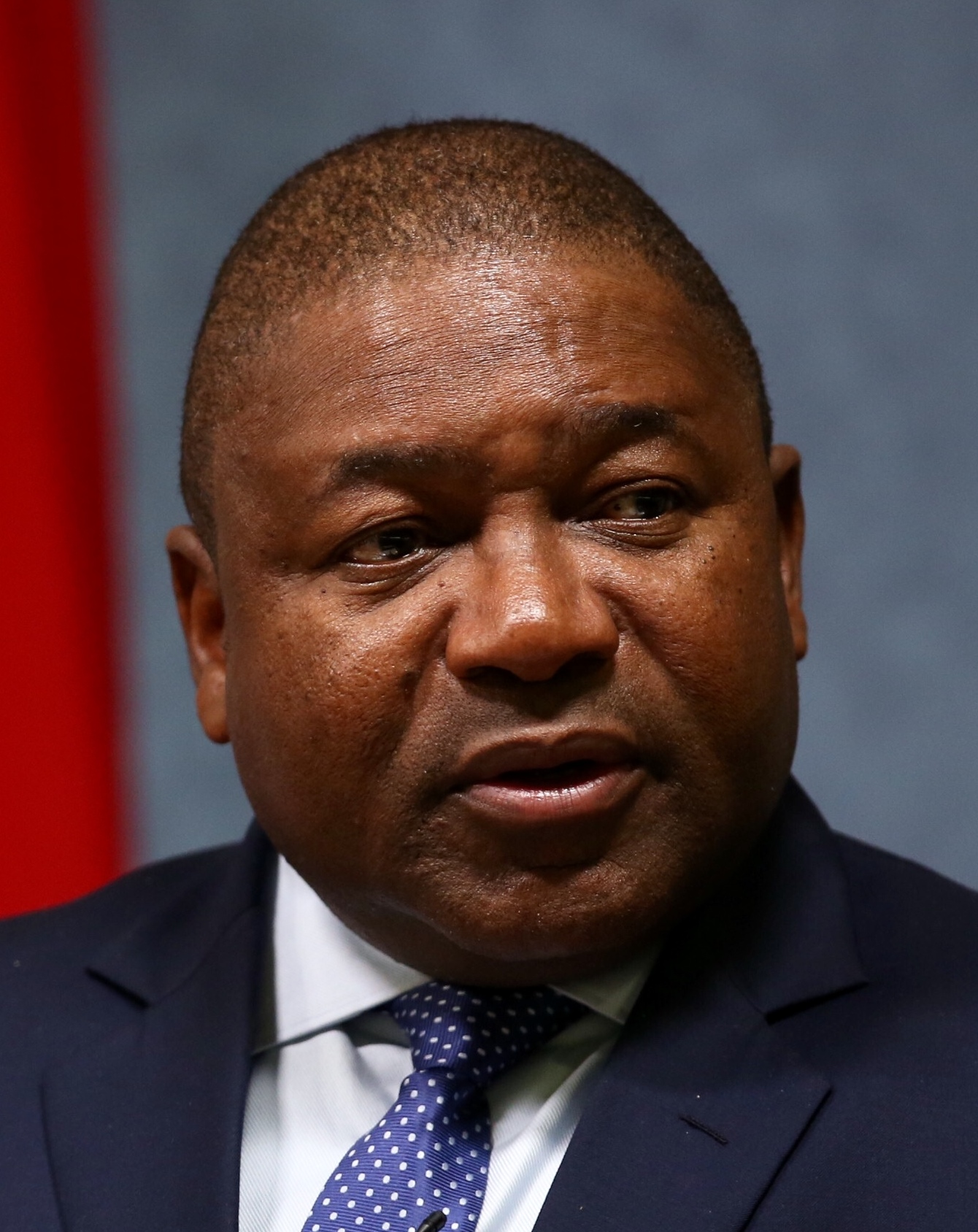

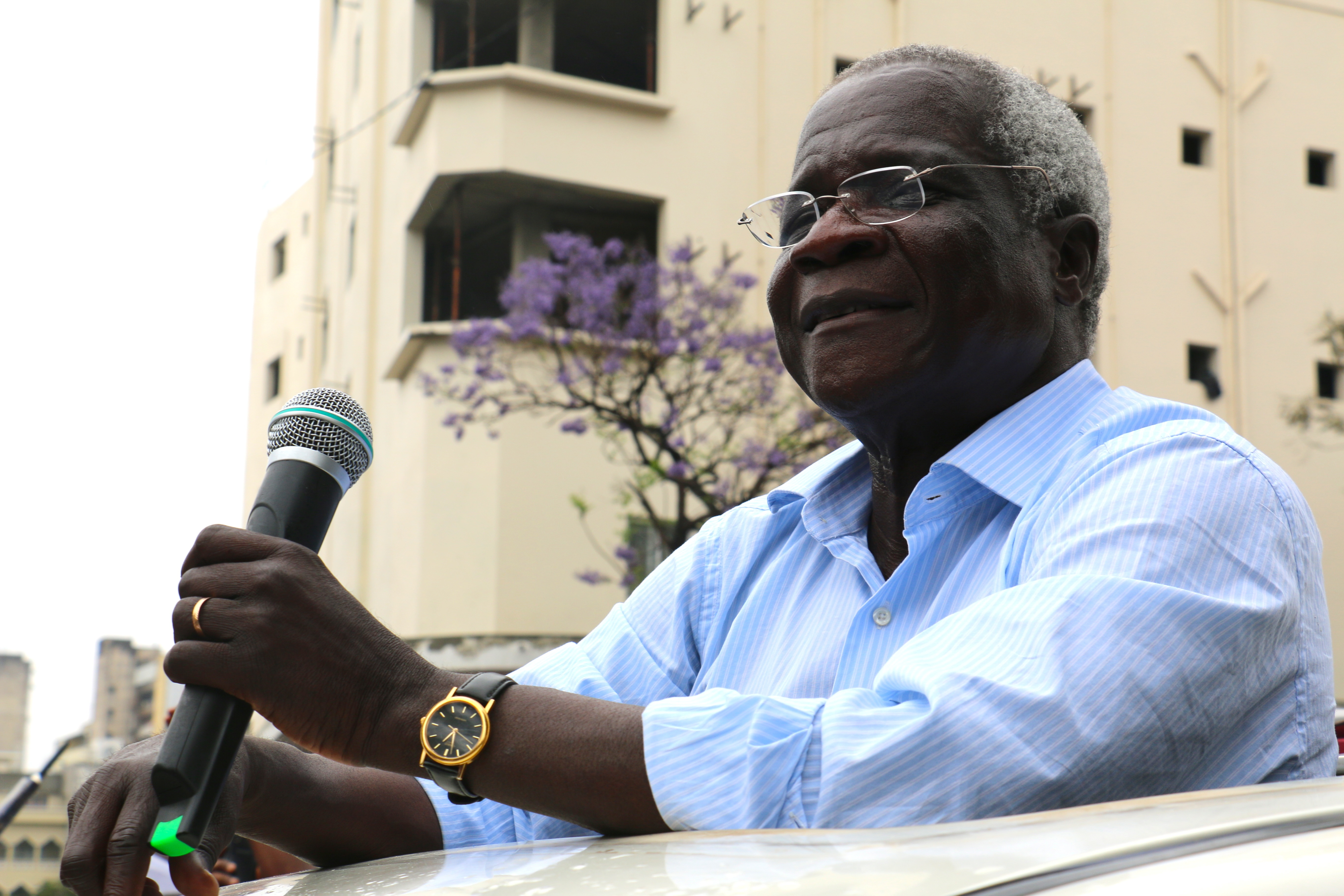

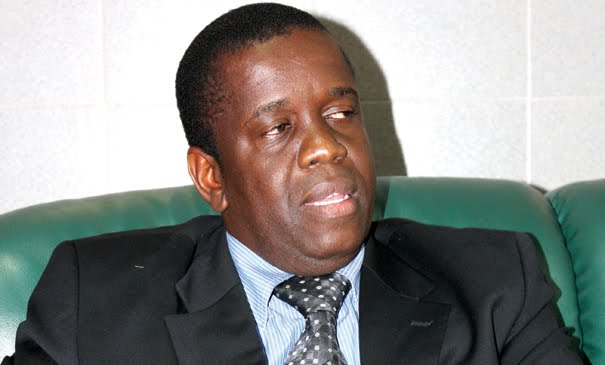
Nominee	Filipe Nyusi	Afonso Dhlakama	Daviz Simango
Party	FRELIMO	RENAMO	MDM
Popular vote	2,803,536	1,800,448	314,759
Percentage	57.00%	36.60%	6.40%
- Parliamentary election
Party	Leader	Vote %	Seats	+/–
FRELIMO	Armando Guebuza	55.68	144	−47
RENAMO	Afonso Dhlakama	32.95	89	+38
MDM	Daviz Simango	8.47	17	+9
This lists parties that won seats. See the complete results below.
- Maps
President before election
Armando Guebuza
FRELIMO
Elected President
Filipe Nyusi
FRELIMO

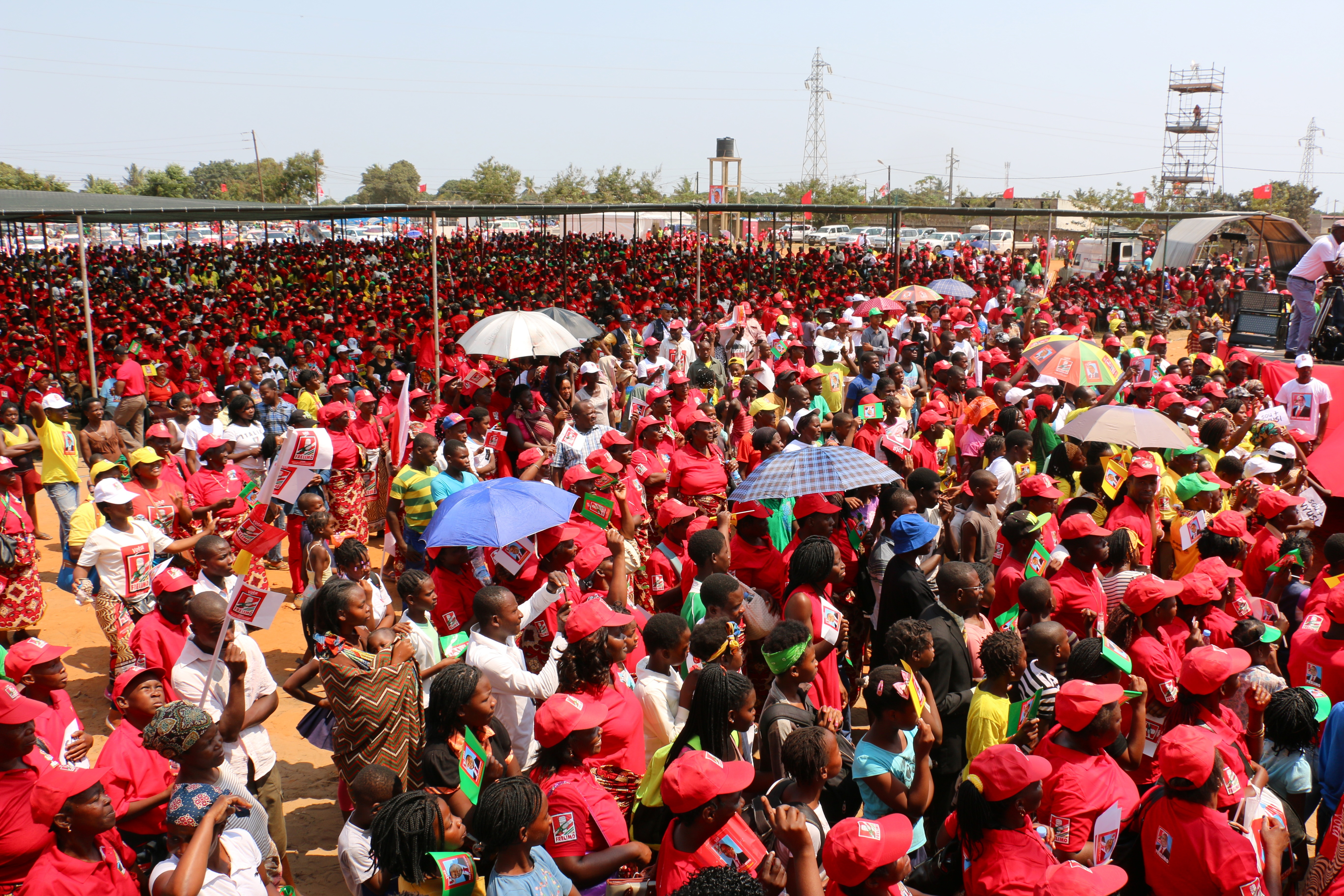
A section of the crowd at FRELIMO's final campaign rally

General elections were held in Mozambique on 15 October 2014. Filipe Nyusi, the candidate of the ruling FRELIMO, was elected president, and FRELIMO retained its parliamentary majority.

== Electoral system ==
The President was elected using the two-round system. Incumbent President Armando Guebuza was constitutionally barred from seeking a third term.

The 250 members of the Assembly of the Republic were elected in 11 multi-member constituencies based on the country's provinces and two single-member constituencies representing Mozambican citizens in Africa and Europe. Seat allocation in the multi-member constituencies was based on proportional representation using the D'Hondt method, with an electoral threshold of 5%.

== Campaign ==
=== Presidential candidates ===
Candidate	Party
Filipe Nyusi	Mozambique Liberation Front (FRELIMO)
Alfonso Dhlakama	Mozambican National Resistance (RENAMO)
Daviz Simango	Mozambique Democratic Movement (MDM)

== Conduct ==
Electoral observers from the European Union stated there were positive aspects: new electoral legislation, a non-disputed voter register and a generally peaceful electoral campaign and an orderly election day, but issues with the tabulation process, and acts of violence and intolerance during the electoral campaign underlined the necessity for important improvements for the future electoral processes.

Electoral observers from the Mozambican Electoral Observatory group concluded that their parallel vote count was broadly in line with the official results. However, the group still termed the elections "partly free and fair, and not very transparent", citing politicization and a lack of transparency of the electoral bodies, voters being turned away and other irregularities.

== Results ==
=== President ===
Candidate	Party	Votes	%
Filipe Nyusi	FRELIMO	2,803,536	57.00
Afonso Dhlakama	RENAMO	1,800,448	36.60
Daviz Simango	Democratic Movement of Mozambique	314,759	6.40
Total		4,918,743	100.00
Valid votes		4,918,743	91.49
Invalid votes		157,174	2.92
Blank votes		300,412	5.59
Total votes		5,376,329	100.00
Registered voters/turnout		10,964,377	49.03
Source: Constitutional Court

=== Assembly ===
Party	Votes	%	Seats	+/–
FRELIMO	2,534,845	55.68	144	–47
RENAMO	1,499,832	32.95	89	+38
Democratic Movement of Mozambique	385,683	8.47	17	+9
Social Broadening Party of Mozambique	10,656	0.23	0	New
Party for Peace, Democracy, and Development–AD	9,437	0.21	0	0
Youth Movement for the Restoration of Democracy	8,728	0.19	0	New
Union for Reconciliation Party	8,929	0.20	0	New
Party of Freedom and Development	8,099	0.18	0	0
National Reconciliation Party	7,872	0.17	0	0
Party of Greens of Mozambique	7,357	0.16	0	0
National Movement for the Recovery of Mozambican Unity	7,098	0.16	0	New
Ecological Party–Land Movement	6,922	0.15	0	0
Humanitarian Party of Mozambique	5,946	0.13	0	New
Patriotic Movement for Democracy	5,779	0.13	0	0
Social Renewal Party	5,692	0.13	0	New
Independent Alliance of Mozambique	5,671	0.12	0	0
Electoral Union	5,611	0.12	0	0
Independent Party of Mozambique	4,593	0.10	0	New
National Workers and Peasants Party	4,164	0.09	0	0
Party of Freedom and Solidarity	3,815	0.08	0	0
Labour Party	3,245	0.07	0	0
United Party of Mozambique for Democratic Freedom	2,980	0.07	0	New
Union for Change	2,527	0.06	0	New
Mozambique People's Progress Party	2,437	0.05	0	0
Independent Social Democratic Party	1,930	0.04	0	New
African Union for the Salvation of the People of Mozambique	1,870	0.04	0	New
Social Liberal Party	464	0.01	0	New
Popular Democratic Party	158	0.00	0	0
Social Democratic Reconciliation Party	43	0.00	0	0
Total	4,552,383	100.00	250	0
Valid votes	4,552,383	86.83		
Invalid votes	245,145	4.68		
Blank votes	445,371	8.49		
Total votes	5,242,899	100.00		
Registered voters/turnout	10,964,377	47.82		
Source: Constitutional Court

=== Provincial elections ===
Province	FRELIMO	RENAMO	MDM
Cabo Delgado Province	67	14	1
Gaza Province	69	0	1
Inhambane Province	58	11	1
Manica Province	49	39	1
Maputo Province	59	12	9
Nampula Province	46	46	1
Niassa Province	42	34	4
Sofala Province	30	45	7
Tete Province	37	42	3
Zambezia Province	37	51	4
Source Mozambique News Agency

== Aftermath ==
The leader of RENAMO, Afonso Dhlakama claimed the results of the election were fraudulent and called for a national unity government, threatening to set up a parallel government if FRELIMO did not agree. However, he later abandoned the call. RENAMO also boycotted the swearing in of the provincial parliaments, and have threatened to boycott the swearing in of the Assembly of the Republic on 12 January 2015.
