= Mozambican National Union =

Political party in Mozambique

Mozambican National Union União Nacional Moçambicana
- Abbreviation: UNAMO
- Leader: Carlos Reis
- Founder: Gimo M’Phiri
- Founded: 1987
- Registered: 1992
- Dissolved: c.2011
- Split from: RENAMO
- Ideology: Anti-Communism; Federalism; Sena interests
- Political position: Center-right to right-wing

The Mozambican National Union, better known by their acronym UNAMO, was a Mozambican rebel group and later political party, that splintered from RENAMO during the Mozambican Civil War due to leadership and ethnic disputes within RENAMO.

== Background ==
From 1964 to 1974 FRELIMO, Communist insurgents, led the fight against the Portuguese Government with backing from the Soviet Union to achieve Mozambique's independence. Following the Carnation Revolution the new Portuguese government sought to disengage from its colonial conflicts and granted independence to its colonies, however, in Mozambique's case the Portuguese gave Mozambique directly to FRELIMO, without any election or input from non-Communist forces. FRELIMO promptly turned Mozambique into a one-party Marxist-Leninist state which was both unpopular with anti-Communist forces, but also with the governments of Rhodesia and the Union of South Africa, as FRELIMO allowed other communist groups, such as ZANLA to operate within their country and conduct attacks against Rhodesia and South Africa. In response, the Rhodesian Central Intelligence Organisation began to coordinate Mozambican anti-Communist exiles in Salisbury led by André Matsangaissa into RENAMO which waged a Civil war against the Mozambican government, even long after the dissolution of Rhodesia. RENAMO absorbed a smaller anti-Communist group, the Revolutionary Party of Mozambique (PRM), in 1982, allowing them to operate in the northern parts of the country, and expand their support base. The PRM had operated from a compound just over the border in Malawi, and where led by Gimo M’Phiri, a former FRELIMO commander turned insurgent who was made the "vice-commander" of RENAMO post merger.

Despite the merger, tensions still existed between the old RENAMO core and the new PRM fighters and officers, especially since RENAMO's upper ranks were dominated by Ndau-speaking commanders from central Mozambique, while the PRM where mostly Sena-speakers from northern Mozambique. By the mid to late 1980s former PRM commanders began to accuse RENAMO's upper leadership of “Ndau tribalism”, and in 1987 RENAMO named Calisto Meque, a Ndau, to lead a campaign in Sena-speaking parts of the north. Many Ndau speaking troops where killed due to their unfamiliarity with the terrain which Meque blamed on Sena officers as a plot to weaken Ndau forces. As such Meque began a purge of Sena officers under his command consisting of both executions, but also a terror campaign against Sena civilians, while at the same time the People's National Security Service (SNASP), FRELIMO's state security agency, began to more seriously infiltrate RENAMO's leadership and "encouraged" further infighting. By 1987 M’Phiri's influence within RENAMO had reached the lowest it had ever been, with M’Phiri growing increasingly isolated and oftentimes making independent strategy decisions with forces still loyal to him.

== History ==
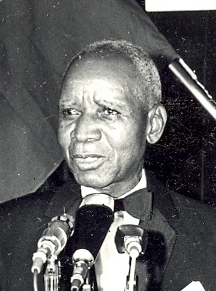
The first President of Malawi, Hastings Banda, was UNAMO's main sponsor during the Mozambican civil war.

In Late 1987 M’Phiri made the decision to retreat across the border back into Malawi with around 500 loyal fighters and formally split from RENAMO, establishing UNAMO with his longtime ally Carlos Reis acting as their political leader. Throughout the war Reis would operate out of mainland Portugal, to seek support from the new Portuguese state in their fight against FRELIMO, to little success, as Portugal was more interested in getting RENAMO and UNAMO to reunite to create a broad, moderate, opposition to FRELIMO. This defection was heavily supported by SNASP as a way to weaken RENAMO, especially due to their recent success in the north. M’Phiri was convinced that he would be able to coordinate with old Portuguese-speaking rebel networks to re-establish a group as big as the PRM. He was successful in courting support from Malawi's president Hastings Banda who had supported the secessionist Rombézia project, which would have seen the northern, mostly Sena, part of Mozambique become its own independent state. However, Banda would lose power in 1994, leaving UNAMO without foreign backing.

UNAMO's base of operations was located in the Gurúè and Mount Namuli areas, and, in effect, operated as a third force in the civil war, fighting both RENAMO and FRELIMO arguing that RENAMO was no longer a "national" resistance movement, and instead solely supported the interests of the Ndau. In 1988 UNAMO raided RENAMO's regional headquarters, killing Calisto Meque. This opposition to RENAMO was short lived, as after a FRELIMO counterattack in 1989 made significant progress in the north UNAMO and RENAMO began coordinating between each other, and allowed each other to use their roads and supply networks and by 1990 RENAMO offered M’Phiri the governorship of Zambezia Province should they win the war, to form a more formal alliance. Starting from 1990 to 1992 UNAMO advocated for a federal structure to the post-war Mozambique and proposed returning power to local traditional authorities. UNAMO also endorsed free-market policies, calling for continued privatization, encouragement of small businesses, foreign investment, and social investment in health, education, and housing. UNAMO was included in the 1994 Rome General Peace Accords, which ended the civil war, and as part of the peace agreement laid down their arms and gave up their insurgency.

=== After the war ===
After the end of the war and the introduction of multi-party democracy UNAMO sought to transition into a political party, similar to RENAMO. In 1992 UNAMO became the first opposition party to register, however, the party began to experience an internal schisim between the militant wing led by M’Phiri and the political wing led by Reis. Both M’Phiri and Reis would "expel" the other from the party, however, since Reis was the one that registered the party, the Mozambican government considered him the party's legal leader. M’Phiri, in turn, formally split from UNAMO, forming the Mozambican Democratic Union or UDEMO.

The party would contest the 1994 elections the first free and fair elections in Mozambique's history, mostly centering their campaign in the north and hoping to form a coalition with RENAMO after the election, as long as RENAMO supported their federalization scheme. However, the 1994 election was a disappointment to the party, which despite winning 120,708 votes or 2.4% of the electorate for Reis to become president, did not win any seats in the assembly as the split with M’Phiri limited any grassroots support the party saw among Sena rank and file. UNAMO joined the Renamo-UE electoral bloc for the 1999 election, the closest any opposition group has come to beating FRELIMO. However, this alliance would fall apart before the 2004 elections due to ideological differences.

For the 2004 election UNAMO would form a coalition with the minor Party of All Mozambican Nationalists (PARTONAMO) forming the United Front for Change and Good Governance (MBG) coalition with Reis standing as the MBG Presidential candidate but came in a distant fourth place, receiving roughly 0.87% of the vote. In the lead-up to the 2009 election FRELIMO changed the election laws to make it harder for smaller parties to stand, requiring 10,000 signatures to run in the Presidential election, which UNAMO was unable to secure. The party would continue to limp along as a local regionalist party in Milange, winning two seats in their city council in the 2008 local elections as Reis finished in second place for the mayoral election. UNAMO would never formally disband, however, after failing to run in the 2009 election they wouldn't stand in any subsequent elections. They remained registered legally during the 2014 and 2019 elections, but didn't have any media presence, nor receive any votes.
