= Alcido Nguenha =

Mozambican politician

Alcido Nguenha (born 31 May 1958) is a Mozambican politician. He was the Minister of Education and Culture from his first appointment in 2000 under then President Joaquim Chissano. He was reappointed by President Armando Guebuza upon his election 2004. He left the post in 2005.
