= Raul Domingos =

Mozambican politician

Raul Domingos is a Mozambican politician who was part of RENAMO until being thrown out on 7 July 2000. At the time, he had been considered the most likely successor to party leader Afonso Dhlakama. From 1994 to 1999, Domingos was head of the Renamo parliamentary group. In the 2004 Mozambican presidential elections Domingos ran for the Party for Peace, Democracy, and Development, gaining 2.7% of the popular vote.
