= United Front of Mozambique =

Political party in Mozambique

- President: Domingos Arouca
- Secretary: José Samo Gudo
- Founded: 1976

The United Front of Mozambique (Portuguese: Frente Unida de Moçambique) is a political party in Mozambique. At the last legislative elections, 1 and 2 December 2004, the party was the main part of the Renamo-UE electoral alliance, that won 29.7% of the popular vote and 90 out of 250 seats. The presidential candidate of this alliance, Afonso Dhlakama, won 31.7% of the popular vote.
