= Mozambican Nationalist Movement =

Political party in Mozambique

The Mozambican Nationalist Movement (Portuguese: Movimento Nacionalista Moçambicano) is a political party in Mozambique. In the 2004 Mozambican general election, the party was part of the Renamo-UE electoral alliance, that got 29.7% of the popular vote and 90 out of 250 seats. The presidential candidate of this alliance, Afonso Dhlakama, got 31.7% of the popular vote.
