= Insurgency in Mozambique =

Insurgency in Mozambique may refer to any insurgency in either Portuguese or independent Mozambique:

- Mozambican War of Independence (1964–1974): Mozambican insurgents versus Portuguese colonial forces
- Mozambican Civil War (1977–1992): Various insurgent groups versus the Mozambican government
- RENAMO insurgency (2013–2019): RENAMO versus the Mozambican government
- Insurgency in Mozambique (2017–present): Ansar-al Sunna and ISIL versus the Mozambican government
