= National Convention Party =

National Convention Party may refer to:

- National Convention Party (The Gambia)
- National Convention Party (Ghana)
- National Convention Party (Malaysia), or Parti Perhimpunan Kebangsaan
- National Convention Party (Mozambique)
