= 24/20 order =

The 24/20 order or 24/20 declaration was a Mozambican operation forcing the Portuguese to leave the country after the independence of Mozambique on 25 June 1975, or give up their passports and become exclusively Mozambican. Armando Guebuza, its creator, made this rule such that the Portuguese had only 24 hours to leave and could carry only 20 kg of baggage, hence its name.
