= Renamo-UE =

Political coalition in Mozambique

The RENAMO-Electoral Union (RENAMO-União Electoral) is an alliance of political parties in Mozambique, led by Afonso Dhlakamaof the Mozambican National Resistance (Resistência Nacional Moçambican).

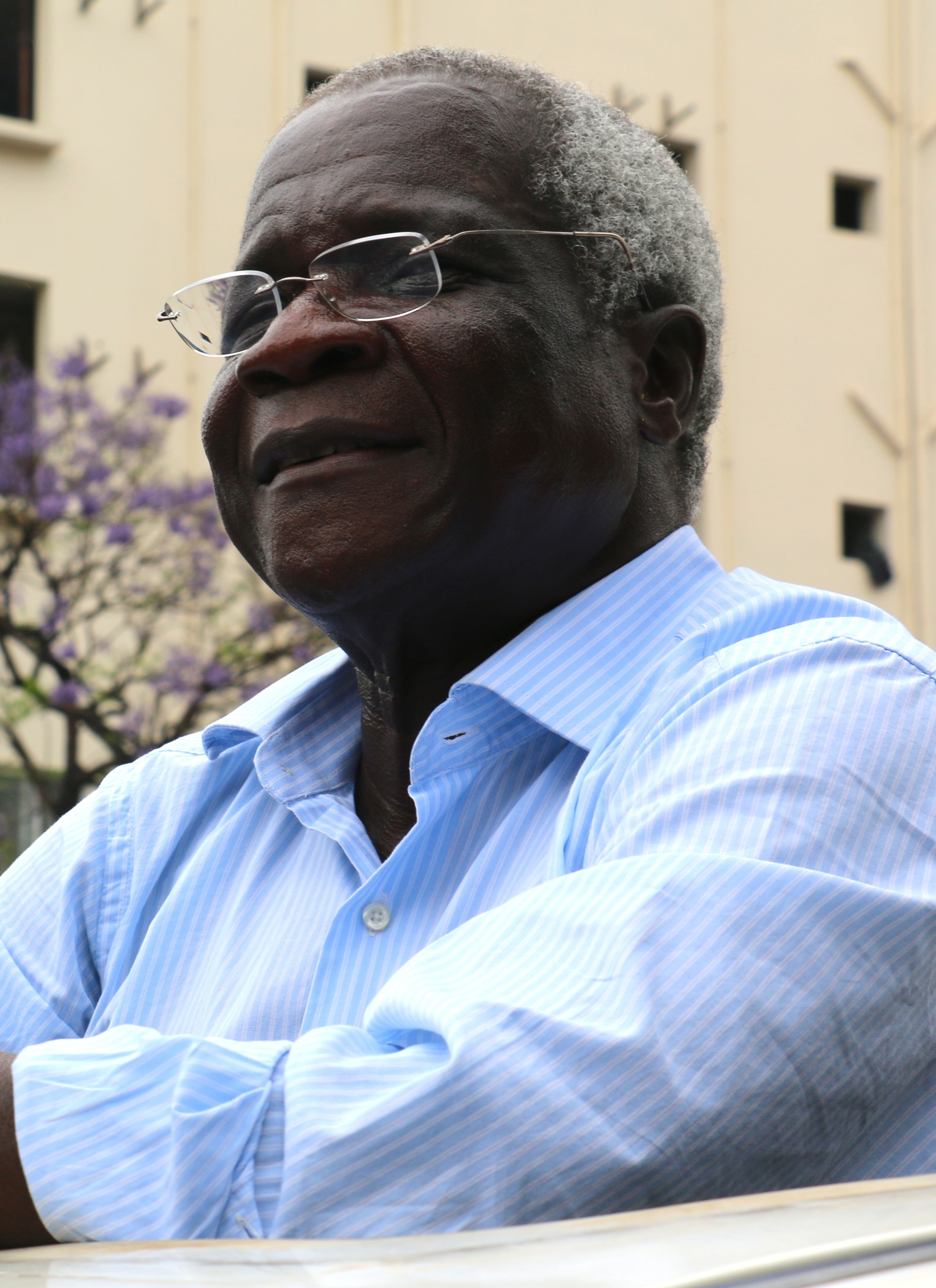
Afonso Dhlakama was the RENAMO-UE presidential candidate in 1999 and 2004.

RENAMO began as an opposition group to the FRELIMO government during the Mozambican Civil War. It was supported first by Ian Smith's Rhodesia and apartheid-era South Africa in the late 1970s and early 1980s. South Africa signed the Nkomati Accord with Mozambique in 1984 and reduced support for RENAMO as part of the accord's plan to prevent cross-border hostilities between the countries. In 1992, Mozambican government and RENAMO signed the Rome General Peace Accords to end the civil war. RENAMO transitioned to a political party ahead of the first Mozambican elections in 1994.

Ahead of the 1999 elections, the RENAMO party formed RENAMO-UE, a coalition with ten other opposition parties, in hopes of consolidating opposition to the FRELIMO president, Joaquim Chissano. RENAMO was the clear leader within the coalition, most noticeably reinforced by the fact that the other parties adopted RENAMO's flag and symbols during the campaign. The presidential election was close, but Chissano was re-elected with a 52% to 48% victory over RENATO party head Afonso Dhlakama.

In the parliamentary election held on 1–2 December 2004, the alliance received 29.7% of the popular vote and won 90 out of 250 seats. Its presidential candidate, Afonso Dhlakama, won 31.7% of the popular vote.

Aside from RENAMO, other parties in the alliance include:

- Independent Alliance of Mozambique (Aliança Independente de Moçambique)
- Mozambican Nationalist Movement (Movimento Nacionalista Moçambicano)
- Mozambican National Union (União Nacional Moçambicana)
- National Convention Party (Partido de Convenção Nacional)
- National Unity Party (Partido de Unidade Nacional)
- Front of Patriotic Action (Frente de Ação Patriotica)
- People's Party of Mozambique (Partido Popular de Moçambique)
- United Front of Mozambique (Frente Unida de Moçambique)
- Greens Party of Mozambique (Partido dos Verdes de Moçambique)
