= Front of Patriotic Action =

Political party in Mozambique

The Front of Patriotic Action (FAP) (Portuguese: Frente de Ação Patriotica) is a political party in Mozambique. In the 1999 general elections, the FAP participated in the RENAMO-UE electoral alliance alongside Mozambique's former rebel group RENAMO and nine other small opposition parties.
