= Elections in Mozambique =

Mozambique elects representatives at several levels:

- at national level a head of state – the president – and a legislature. The president is elected for a five-year term by the people. The Assembly of the Republic (Assembleia da República) has 250 members, elected for a five-year term by proportional representation.
- at provincial level, since 2009 Provincial Assemblies, elected at the same time that the national elections.
- at local level, since 1998 Municipal Elections to elect the leaders of the growing number of municipalities: the President of the Municipal Council and Municipal Assemblies.

== Latest election ==
=== President ===
Candidate	Party	Votes	%
Daniel Chapo	FRELIMO	4,416,306	65.17
Venâncio Mondlane	Optimist Party for the Development of Mozambique	1,639,333	24.19
Ossufo Momade	RENAMO	448,738	6.62
Lutero Simango	Democratic Movement of Mozambique	272,736	4.02
Total		6,777,113	100.00

=== Assembly ===
Party	Votes	%	Seats
FRELIMO	4,910,858	71.43	171
Optimist Party for the Development of Mozambique	889,788	12.94	43
RENAMO	557,724	8.11	28
Democratic Movement of Mozambique	240,409	3.50	8
Party of Greens of Mozambique	59,041	0.86	0
National Reconciliation Party	18,012	0.26	0
New Democracy	15,723	0.23	0
Democratic Revolution Party	15,712	0.23	0
Youth Movement for the Restoration of Democracy	14,864	0.22	0
Ecological Party–Land Movement	14,759	0.21	0
National Unity Party (Mozambique)	14,432	0.21	0
Patriotic Movement for Democracy	14,360	0.21	0
Mozambican National Union	13,967	0.20	0
Social Renewal Party	12,012	0.17	0
Labour Party	10,656	0.15	0
Democratic Liberal Party of Mozambique	8,386	0.12	0
Humanitarian Party of Mozambique	8,376	0.12	0
Union for Change Party	7,321	0.11	0
Reconciliation Party of Mozambique	6,516	0.09	0
Ecological Party of Mozambique	6,328	0.09	0
United Development Action Party for Integral Salvation	5,676	0.08	0
National Movement for the Recovery of Mozambican Unity	4,883	0.07	0
Party of Freedom and Development	4,561	0.07	0
National Workers and Peasants Party	3,195	0.05	0
Reconciliation Movement of Mozambique	2,536	0.04	0
Democratic Justice Party of Mozambique	2,433	0.04	0
Party for the Progress of the People of Mozambique	2,227	0.03	0
Social Broadening Party of Mozambique	2,071	0.03	0
Mozambican National Party/CRD	1,819	0.03	0
Party for the Development of Mozambique	1,663	0.02	0
Party for Peace, Democracy, and Development	1,241	0.02	0
Union of Mozambican Democrats	1,192	0.02	0
United Democrats Congress	1,060	0.02	0
Party of Social Democratic Reconciliation	774	0.01	0
People's Democratic Party of Mozambique	619	0.01	0
Total	6,875,194	100.00	250

== Electoral commission law ==
Mozambican elections are run by a National Election Commission (CNE), and the election law has changed often. In December 2012, a new law in regards to the composition of the election commission consists of eight political party representatives: five appointed by the incumbent FRELIMO, two appointed by the principal opposition RENAMO and one by the Democratic Movement of Mozambique (MDM). There are further three members nominated by civil society representatives, a judge appointed by the Higher Council of the Judicial Magistrature and an attorney appointed by the Higher Council of the Public Prosecutor's Office.

== 1994 – Presidential and Parliamentary election ==
In the first multi-party elections held in Mozambique, in 1994, FRELIMO candidate and president of Mozambique since 1986 Joaquim Chissano was elected and the opposition party and former guerrilla group RENAMO acknowledged the result. The United Nations Security Council, which had a peacekeeping operation based there due to the civil war, endorsed the results as free and fair in Resolution 960.

== 1999 – Presidential and Parliamentary election ==
In the elections in late 1999 President Joaquim Chissano from FRELIMO was re-elected with 52.3% of the vote, and FRELIMO secured 133 of 250 parliamentary seats. The main opposition parties candidate, RENAMO's Afonso Dhlakama, got 47.7% and the party won the remaining 117 parliamentary seats.

== 2004 – Presidential and Parliamentary election ==
In the 1–2 December 2004 election Armando Guebuza, the new FRELIMO candidate, won with 63.7% of the votes, more than twice as many as RENAMO's candidate Afonso Dhlakama (31.7%). In the parliamentary election FRELIMO won 62% (1.8 million) of the votes, RENAMO 29.7% (905,000 votes), and 18 minor parties shared the remaining 8%. FRELIMO will hold 160 of the parliamentary seats, RENAMO 90.

The elections have been criticized for not having been conducted in a fair and transparent manner by the National Electoral Commission. Several cases of electoral fraud have occurred and remained unsanctioned. This has been criticized among others by the European Union Election Observation Mission to Mozambique and the Carter Center. However, the elections shortcomings have probably not (also according to EU observers) affected the result in the presidential election. The distribution of parliamentary seats among the parties will have been somewhat altered, though (RENAMO probably losing a number of seats to FRELIMO).

On 2 February 2005 Guebuza was sworn in as president of the republic, but without Dhlakama and RENAMO's recognition and presence at the inauguration. RENAMO have, however, agreed to participate in the Parliament and the Council of State.

== 2009 – Presidential and Parliamentary election ==
The Presidential and Parliamentary elections were held on 28 October 2009 for the fourth time since the introduction of the multiparty system. In the elections for the Assembly of the Republic, FRELIMO and RENAMO contested all 13 parliamentary constituencies, but the newly formed MDM was able to contest only 4 parliamentary constituencies.

== 2014 – Presidential and Parliamentary election ==
The Presidential and Parliamentary elections were held on 15 October 2014 for the fifth time since the introduction of the multiparty system. In the elections for the Assembly of the Republic, FRELIMO, MDM and RENAMO contested all 13 parliamentary constituencies.

== Parliamentary election results ==
Political Party	Election Year					
Political Party	1994	1999	2004	2009	2014	2019
Mozambique Liberation Front (FRELIMO)	129	133	160	191	144	184
Mozambican National Resistance (RENAMO)	112	-	-	51	89	60
Mozambican National Resistance-Electoral Union (RENAMO-UE)	-	117	90	-	-	-
Democratic Union (UD)	09	-	-	-	-	-
Democratic Movement of Mozambique (MDM)	-	-	-	08	17	6
Total	250	250	250	250	250	250
Turnout	87.9%	69.54%	33.60%	44.63%	49.03%	51.84%

== See also ==
- Electoral calendar
- Electoral system
