= 1994 Mozambican general election =

- 27–29 October 1994
- Presidential election
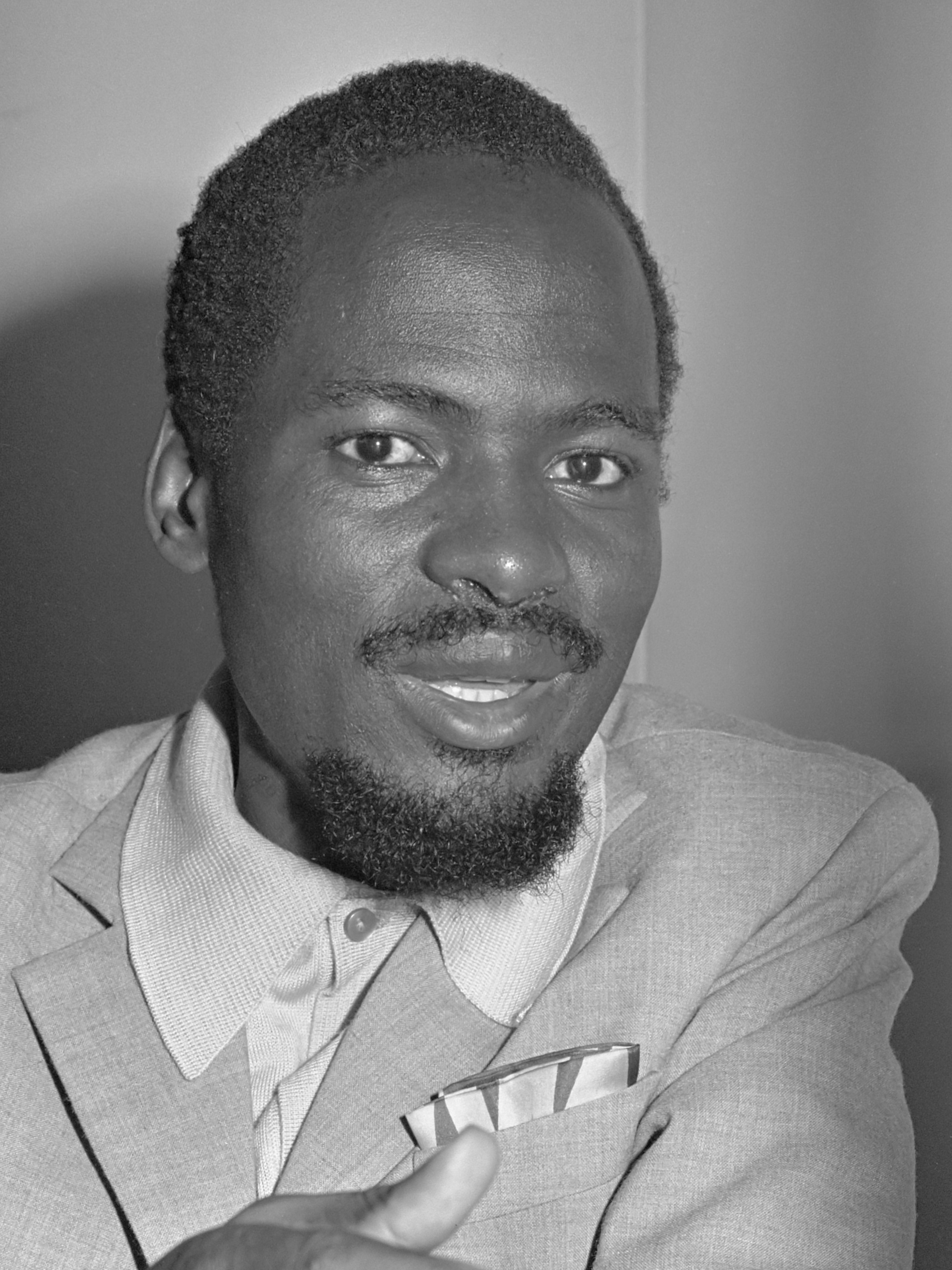

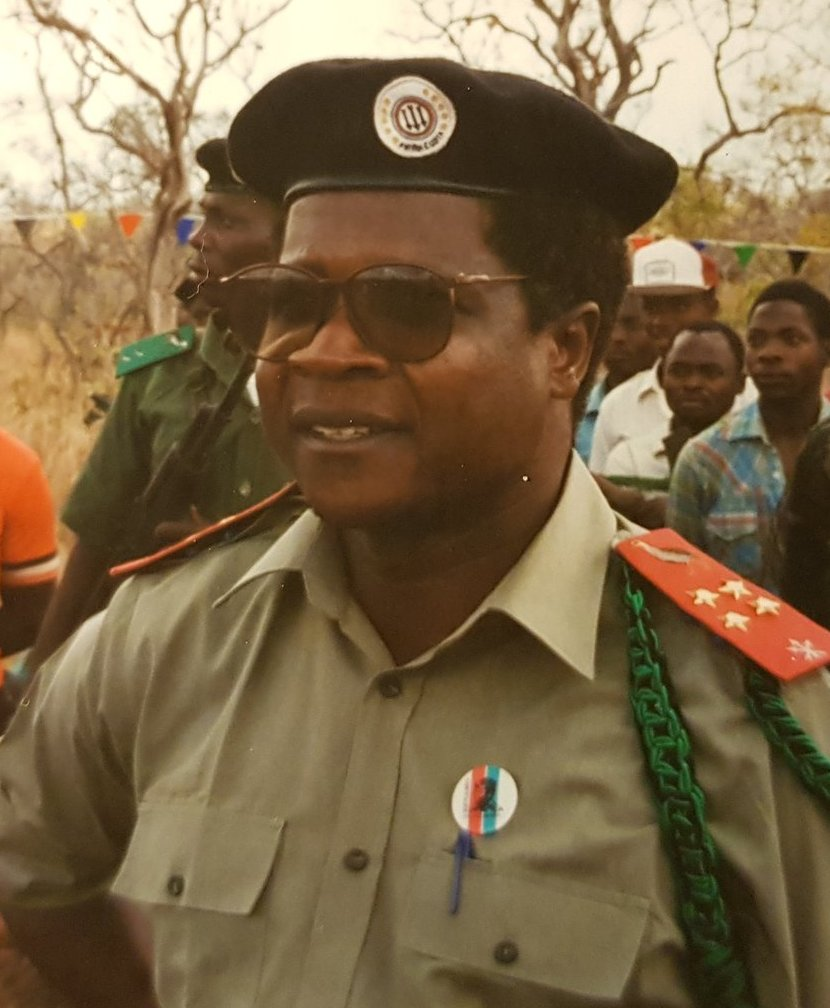
| Nominee | Joaquim Chissano | Afonso Dhlakama |
| Party | FRELIMO | RENAMO |
| Popular vote | 2,633,740 | 1,666,965 |
| Percentage | 53.30% | 33.73% |
- Parliamentary election
| Party | Leader | Vote % | Seats | +/– |
|---|---|---|---|---|
| FRELIMO | Joaquim Chissano | 44.33 | 129 | −120 |
| RENAMO | Afonso Dhlakama | 37.78 | 112 | New |
| UD | Antonio Palange | 5.15 | 9 | New |
This lists parties that won seats. See the complete results below.
- Maps
President before election
Joaquim Chissano
FRELIMO
Elected President
Joaquim Chissano
FRELIMO

General elections were held in Mozambique between 27 and 29 October 1994 to elect a president and the Assembly of the Republic. It was the first time the country had had multi-party elections, as previously FRELIMO had been the sole legal party. Nevertheless, FRELIMO maintained control of the country's political system, winning both elections. Voter turnout for the elections was 88%.

== Results ==
=== President ===
| Candidate | Party | Votes | % |
|---|---|---|---|
| Joaquim Chissano | FRELIMO | 2,633,740 | 53.30 |
| Afonso Dhlakama | RENAMO | 1,666,965 | 33.73 |
| Wehia Ripua | Mozambique Democratic Party | 141,905 | 2.87 |
| Carlos Reis | Mozambique National Union | 120,708 | 2.44 |
| Máximo Dias | MONAMO-PMSD | 115,442 | 2.34 |
| Campira Momboya | Democratic Congress Party | 58,848 | 1.19 |
| Yaqub Sibindy | Independent Party of Mozambique | 51,070 | 1.03 |
| Domingos Arouca | Mozambique United Front-Democratic Convergence Party | 37,767 | 0.76 |
| Carlos Jeque | Independent | 34,588 | 0.70 |
| Casimiro Nhamitambo | Social Liberal Party | 32,036 | 0.65 |
| Mário Machel | Independent | 24,238 | 0.49 |
| Padimbe Kamati | Mozambique People's Progress Party | 24,208 | 0.49 |
| Total | | 4,941,515 | 100.00 |
| Valid votes | | 4,941,515 | 91.46 |
| Invalid/blank votes | | 461,425 | 8.54 |
| Total votes | | 5,402,940 | 100.00 |
| Registered voters/turnout | | 6,148,842 | 87.87 |
Source: CNE

=== Assembly ===
| Party | Votes | % | Seats | +/– |
|---|---|---|---|---|
| FRELIMO | 2,115,793 | 44.33 | 129 | −120 |
| RENAMO | 1,803,506 | 37.78 | 112 | New |
| Democratic Union | 245,793 | 5.15 | 9 | New |
| Patriotic Alliance | 93,031 | 1.95 | 0 | New |
| Social Liberal Party | 79,622 | 1.67 | 0 | New |
| Mozambique United Front-Democratic Convergence Party | 66,527 | 1.39 | 0 | New |
| National Convention Party | 60,635 | 1.27 | 0 | New |
| Independent Party of Mozambique | 58,590 | 1.23 | 0 | New |
| Democratic Congress Party | 52,446 | 1.10 | 0 | New |
| Mozambique People's Progress Party | 50,793 | 1.06 | 0 | New |
| Democratic Renewal Party | 48,030 | 1.01 | 0 | New |
| Mozambique Democratic Party | 36,689 | 0.77 | 0 | New |
| Mozambique National Union | 34,809 | 0.73 | 0 | New |
| Labor Party | 26,961 | 0.56 | 0 | New |
| Total | 4,773,225 | 100.00 | 250 | +1 |
| Valid votes | 4,773,225 | 88.32 | | |
| Invalid/blank votes | 630,974 | 11.68 | | |
| Total votes | 5,404,199 | 100.00 | | |
| Registered voters/turnout | 6,148,842 | 87.89 | | |
Source: CNE
