= Revolutionary Party of Mozambique =

Mozambican rebel group

- Portuguese: Partido Revolucionário de Moçambique
- Leaders: Amos Sumane (1974/76–1980); Gimo Phiri (1980–1982)
- Dates active: 1974/76–1982
- Merged into: RENAMO
- Active regions: Northern Mozambique, southern Malawi
- Ideology: Anti-communism; Freedom of religion Democracy

The Revolutionary Party of Mozambique (PRM; Portuguese: Partido Revolucionário de Moçambique) was an armed rebel group in northern Mozambique during the Mozambican Civil War. Founded by Amos Sumane in 1974 or 1976, the PRM was strongly opposed to Mozambique's FRELIMO government and its communist ideology. The party waged a low-level insurgency in the provinces of Zambezia, Tete and Niassa from 1977. Sumane was captured in 1980 and executed by the Mozambican government in 1981. The PRM's leadership passed to Gimo Phiri under whom the party merged with another rebel group, RENAMO, in 1982.

== Etymology ==
The Revolutionary Party of Mozambique was also known as Revolucionário de Forças Moçambique and África Livre ("Free Africa"). According to historian Sérgio Inácio Chichava, the PRM and África Livre were often conflated. The name África Livre originates from the radio station Voz da África Livre (Voice of Free Africa) created by the Rhodesian Central Intelligence Organisation to broadcast anti-FRELIMO propanganda. Those listening began to regard reports from the station detailing attacks against FRELIMO targets as part of an África Livre movement. PRM leader Gimo Phiri stated in an interview that África Livre did not refer to an actual organization but served as a collective term for all anti-FRELIMO groups in Zambezia. Accordingly, a variety of minor anti-FRELIMO movements in northern Mozambique, including Sagwati, Maramara, Nharene, Involiwa, and COREMO as well as UNAR remnants have been termed África Livre.

== History ==
=== Foundation ===
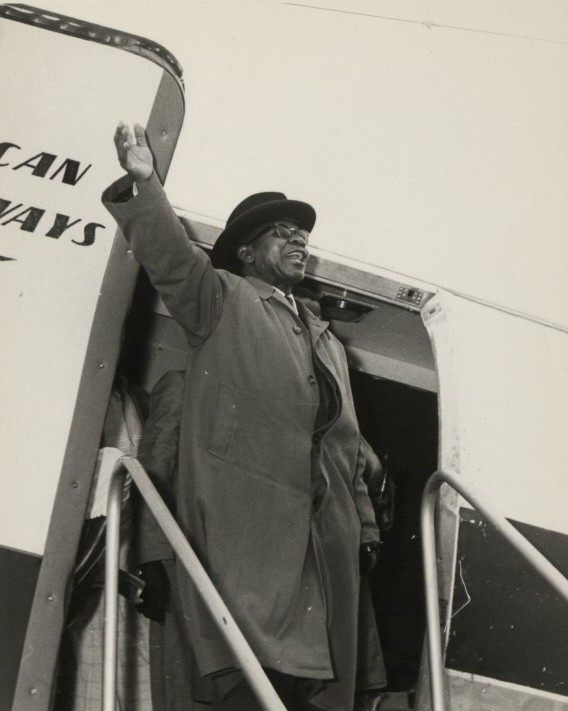
Malawi under President Hastings Banda (pictured) played a major role in supporting UNAR, a predecessor of the PRM.

Several rebel groups, most importantly FRELIMO, fought against Portugal in the Mozambican War of Independence from 1964. One insurgent faction, the Mozambique Revolutionary Committee (COREMO), was active in northwestern Mozambique. It splintered in 1968 when its deputy president Amos Sumane broke off and founded the Rumbezi African National Union (UNAR). UNAR was primarily active in Zambezia Province, a region where FRELIMO had little popular support. Sumane's forces fought for the separation of "Rumbezia", the region between the Rovuma and Zambezi rivers, from Mozambique and its eventual unification with Malawi. FRELIMO claimed that UNAR was created by the Portuguese PIDE-DGS secret police and the Malawian government under President Hastings Banda. UNAR was short-lived, but Sumane remained active and forged close links to the Mozambican community in Malawi.

The war of independence ended in 1974 with the Portuguese withdrawal from Mozambique, whereupon FRELIMO seized power in the country and marginalized other rebel forces. Some factions responded by founding RENAMO and launching a rebellion against the FRELIMO government, resulting in the Mozambican Civil War. Sumane also took up arms against FRELIMO, but opted to organize a separate rebel group known as Revolutionary Party of Mozambique (PRM) in 1974 or 1976. The group was described as successor or rebranding of UNAR, and was based in Malawi. According to researchers Jeremy W. Weinstein and Laudemiro Francisco, the PRM was founded with "active Malawian support". (Note: Generalist encyclopedia editors Arthur S. Banks and Thomas C. Muller quote an unreferenced source that claims PRM was "not related to outside assistance.") Paul Favert noted that former PIDE Mozambican operatives exiled in Malawi acted in concert with Sumane to organise cross-border attacks. (Note: A substantial number of Portuguese colonial secret police agents as well as FRELIMO deserters joined the Malawian military, police, and civil service following Mozambique's independence.) Historian David Hedges specifically regarded Jorge Jardim, a Portuguese businessman, as one of the PRM's main instigators and supporters.

=== Insurgency ===
Map of Mozambique, showing locations of PRM activity during the civil war.

The PRM managed to attract a significant following among the rural population of northern Mozambique. Parts of the region such as Milange District had a long history of banditry, and many local armed groups were opposed to FRELIMO. Militants in northern Mozambique included peasant rebels, remnants of earlier separatist factions, "externally sponsored destabilization forces", and regular criminals. The PRM absorbed former COREMO elements, and the remnants of "Rumbezia separatist" groups, most importantly local branches of UNAR. Sumane's force mostly recruited ethnic Lomué tribesmen who had suffered economically due to the collapse of the regional plantation economy, and had been marginalized by FRELIMO's rural modernization policies such as the establishment of communal villages. The PRM consequently regarded the FRELIMO-organized communal villages as primary target, but also attacked other government-associated locations such as "People's Shops", party offices, local branches of FRELIMO mass organizations, homes of officials, and police stations.

The PRM's political commissar Gimo Phiri would later claim that the group's first attack on FRELIMO troops took place at Jalasse in Zambezia Province on 8 August 1978. In spite of this claim, there were reports of PRM already waging a low-level insurgency in Tete and Niassa Provinces by 1977. From its foundation, the PRM suffered from a lack of adequate weaponry; it was forced to use sticks, axes, machetes, and spears in combat. In order to get access to guns, the group had to capture them from FRELIMO troops. The Mozambican government initially regarded the PRM as mere bandits, though admitted that they enjoyed some support from locals in Zambezia Province. After its first attacks, the PRM gradually grew in numbers and expanded its operations. It forged alliances with the rural population including tribal chiefs, infiltrated FRELIMO's women's league, and had contacts in Malawi. By 1979, the group was active in Milange, Gurué, Namarroi, Lugela, and Mecanhelas Districts. In course of 1980, the PRM took control of much of Milange, and many local government representatives defected to the insurgents. Around the same time, the Malawian government began to normalize its relations with the FRELIMO government of Mozambique, and pledged to prevent cross-border attacks by Mozambican rebels. It proved to be unable to fulfill this pledge. The Malawian government did not fully control "its own state apparatus", and consequently did not expel the PRM.

As the PRM became more active, the Mozambican government began to take the rebels more seriously, and intensified its counter-insurgency operations. Its agents abducted Sumane from Blantyre in Malawi around 1980; he was executed in 1981. Other prominent PRM members such as Joaquim Veleia, Matias Tenda, and Lucas Saguate were also killed. Despite these setbacks, the PRM's insurgency and cross-border attacks continued. Phiri was appointed as Sumane's successor, and the party even expanded its operations in Zambezia, Tete, and Niassa under his leadership. David Hedges argued that the PRM's partial resurgence stemmed from support by South Africa, channeled through Malawi. The Mozambican government increasingly pressured Malawi to suppress PRM activity, whereupon 18 PRM members were arrested and extradited to Mozambique on 26 January 1981.

By 1982, the group was launching raids near Lake Amaramba and in Mutarara District. On 20 September 1982, the PRM destroyed Muabanama, the only communal village of Lugela District. This event "reduced to nothing the achievement" of local government policies, as Muabanama had acted as pioneer project for the region. The PRM's campaign greatly hindered the implementation of FRELIMO's communal village system. The Mozambican government eventually resorted to forcing people to relocate to communal villages in some areas such as Milange District, hoping that this would isolate the rural population from the rebels. Despite this, the PRM's actual military successes were limited, and it remained resource-poor. RENAMO fighters who operated alongside PRM militants later claimed that the latter resorted to "rudimentary" tactics and were "mainly relying on stones" to fight the Mozambican government.

=== Merger with RENAMO and legacy ===
In mid-1982, RENAMO contacted the PRM with an offer to merge their forces. RENAMO representative Khembo dos Santos met with Gimo Phiri in Malawi, but their first talks were inconclusive. The PRM had previously requested assistance from RENAMO, but never received any. This resulted in doubts about the honesty of the merger proposals. Negotiations continued, and RENAMO entered Zambezia Province to fight alongside the PRM against FRELIMO in August 1982. The PRM officially agreed to merge during a conference at a camp on Mount Namuli, and consequently provided the core for RENAMO's presence in Zambezia. According to researcher William Finnegan, the merger was facilitated by RENAMO's South African allies with the purpose of opening a northern front against FRELIMO. Phiri rose to a senior leadership position under RENAMO chief Afonso Dhlakama. His followers were distributed to three RENAMO bases in Zambezia, and provided with much-needed weaponry.

As result of leadership struggles, tribal disputes, and policy disagreements in RENAMO, Phiri and about 500 followers (Note: Phiri claimed that he broke off with 3,000 fighters.) broke off in late 1987 or early 1988, founding the Mozambican National Union (UNAMO) ostensibly in honor of Sumane. Phiri's troops consequently waged their own low-level insurgency, clashing with RENAMO loyalists and FRELIMO along Malawi's southeastern border. This marked the only major split of RENAMO during the civil war. According to researchers Weinstein and Francisco, Phiri believed that he could compete with RENAMO using his past experience as independent commander and the weaponry which his forces had gained through the merger. He hoped to replenish his stockpiles by capturing weapons from the government, and through external support. Regardless, UNAMO's insurgency was short-lived. Phiri was unable to gain foreign backers, and the costs of maintaining his troops were "far too high". UNAMO began to occasionally ally with FRELIMO to defeat RENAMO forces, and Phiri agreed to join sides with the Mozambican government in 1988.

UNAMO organized the so-called "Maria Group" to patrol certain areas in Zambezia, and fought for FRELIMO for the rest of the civil war. The UNAMO fighters were demobilized as part of the General Peace Agreement (AGP). After the civil war's end, UNAMO was legalized and took part in the elections. However, its leader Phiri was deposed during internal party struggles, and subsequently founded the Democratic Union of Mozambique (Udemo) in protest. The Mozambican government also renegaded on the promises made to him during the civil war. In response, Phiri threatened to start a new insurgency in 1996, but this was just a bluff. He subsequently became politically insignificant.

== Organization, ideology, and tactics ==
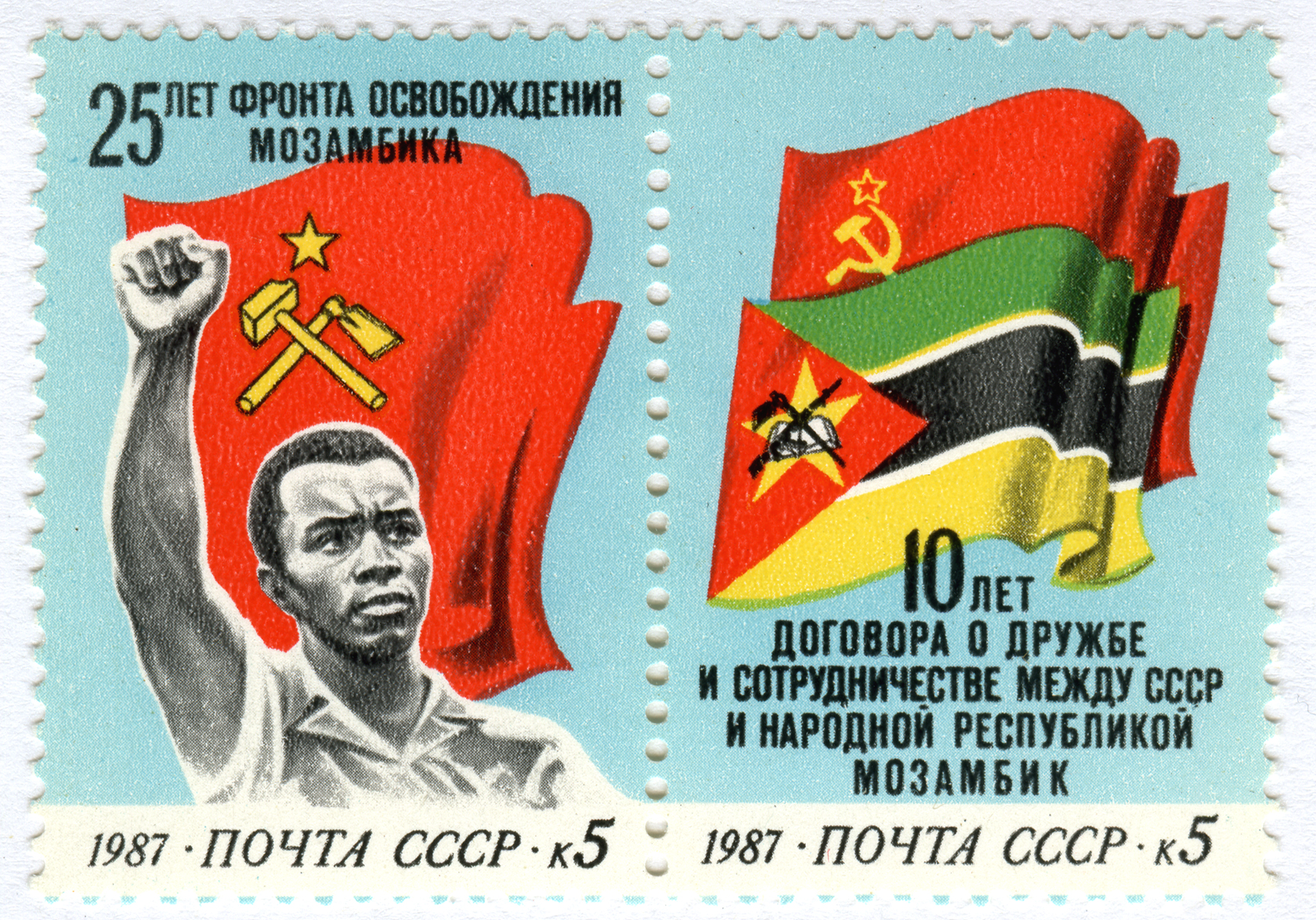
The PRM was anti-communist and opposed to FRELIMO's left-wing policies (pictured: Soviet stamp commemorating FRELIMO)

The PRM was led by Amos Sumane, an ex-member of FRELIMO and COREMO, until his capture and execution by the Mozambican government. He was succeeded by Gimo Phiri, a native of Mutarara District. Besides Sumane and Phiri, Lucas Saguate served as one of the group's main commanders. (Note: Lucas Saguate was an ex-soldier of the São Tomé and Príncipe colonial army who had been imprisoned for ten years after joining an anti-Portuguese rebellion in Mozambique. Following his release, he joined FRELIMO and served as military instructor before defecting to the PRM. According to legends, he possessed magical powers. Sugate was killed in a FRELIMO trap on 6 April 1981.)

The PRM claimed to fight for "true independence, democracy, development, freedom of worship", and regarded FRELIMO as authoritarian as well as tribalist. The group was anti-communist and consequently opposed to FRELIMO's government policies such as the communal villages and "people's shops". These were targeted by the PRM as part of the "wotcha weka" (translated "I will burn you myself") tactics: Militants of the group entered communal villages, fired into the air, and then "organised" the locals to burn the settlements and return to their original homes. Phiri argued that "wotcha weka" was done in benefit of the rural population. According to researcher Sérgio Chichava, many peasants were actually dissatisfied with the communal villages and supported the PRM; others destroyed their settlements out of fear of reprisals by the insurgents. The destruction of communal villages was a generally effective strategy, as it not just exploited anti-FRELIMO sentiments of civilians, but also separated the population from government influence. The PRM actually contributed to the failure of the communal village system in northern Mozambique.

In its insurgency, the PRM often used stolen uniforms to disguise its members as government agents and police officers. It was thus able to infiltrate locations and carry out surprise attacks. Furthermore, the group enlisted militias of traditional chiefs as auxiliaries to bolster its numbers.
