= List of presidents of Mozambique =

President of Mozambique
- Presidente de Moçambique (Portuguese)
- Presidential standard

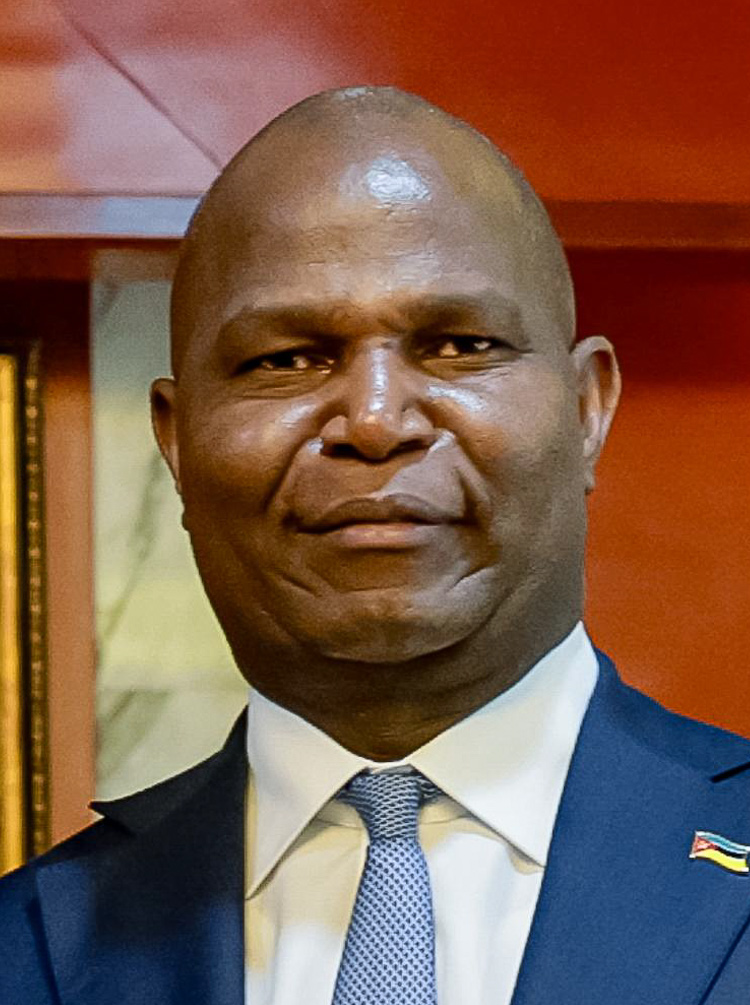
- Incumbent; Daniel Chapo since 15 January 2025
- Type: Head of state; Head of government; Commander-in-chief
- Residence: Palácio da Ponta Vermelha, Maputo
- Term length: Five years, renewable once
- Constituting instrument: Constitution of Mozambique (2004)
- Inaugural holder: Samora Machel
- Formation: 25 June 1975; 51 years ago
- Succession: President of the Assembly of the Republic
- Salary: US$46,800 annually

This article lists the presidents of Mozambique, since the establishment of the office of president in 1975.

The current president of Mozambique is Daniel Chapo. Chapo was inaugurated for his first term as the country's fifth president on 15 January 2025. The president is also the commander-in-chief of the armed forces.

== Term limits ==
As of 2021, there is a two-term limit for the president in the Constitution of Mozambique. The first president for whom the term limits applied was Joaquim Chissano in 2005.

== Presidents of Mozambique (1975–present) ==
No.	Portrait	President	Took office	Left office	Time in office	Party	Election
People's Republic of Mozambique
1	Samora Machel	Samora Machel (1933–1986)	25 June 1975	19 October 1986 †	11 years, 116 days	FRELIMO	1977
–	Political Bureau of the Central Committee of FRELIMO	Political Bureau of the Central Committee of FRELIMO; Acting	19 October 1986	6 November 1986	18 days	FRELIMO	—
2	Joaquim Chissano	Joaquim Chissano (born 1939)	6 November 1986	1 December 1990	4 years, 25 days	FRELIMO	1986
Republic of Mozambique
(2)	Joaquim Chissano	Joaquim Chissano (born 1939)	1 December 1990	2 February 2005	14 years, 63 days	FRELIMO	1994; 1999
3	Armando Guebuza	Armando Guebuza (born 1943)	2 February 2005	15 January 2015	9 years, 347 days	FRELIMO	2004; 2009
4	Filipe Nyusi	Filipe Nyusi (born 1959)	15 January 2015	15 January 2025	10 years	FRELIMO	2014; 2019
5	Daniel Chapo	Daniel Chapo (born 1977)	15 January 2025	Incumbent	1 year, 249 days	FRELIMO	2024

== Latest election ==
Candidate	Party	Votes	%
Daniel Chapo	FRELIMO	4,416,306	65.17
Venâncio Mondlane	PODEMOS	1,639,333	24.19
Ossufo Momade	RENAMO	448,738	6.62
Lutero Simango	MDM	272,736	4.02
Total		6,777,113	100.00
Valid votes		6,777,113	93.63
Invalid votes		205,601	2.84
Blank votes		255,313	3.53
Total votes		7,238,027	100.00
Registered voters/turnout		17,169,239	42.16
Source: Conselho Constitucional

== See also ==
- List of prime ministers of Mozambique
- List of colonial governors of Mozambique
- List of heads of the National Resistance Government of Mozambique
