= National Convention Party (Mozambique) =

Political party in Mozambique

The National Convention Party (Portuguese: Partido de Convenção Nacional) is a political party in Mozambique. At the last legislative elections, 1 and 2 December 2004, the party was the main part of the Renamo-UE electoral alliance, that won 29.7% of the popular vote and 90 out of 250 seats. The presidential candidate of this alliance, Afonso Dhlakama, won 31.7% of the popular vote.
