= Party of Greens of Mozambique =

Political party in Mozambique

Party of Greens of Mozambique Partido os Verdes de Moçambique
- Founded: 1997
- Ideology: Green politics
- Regional affiliation: Federation of Green Parties of Africa (observer)

The Party of Greens of Mozambique (Portuguese: Partido os Verdes de Moçambique, PVM) is a political party formed in 1997. Before the 1999 elections the party split in two factions over whether to support the RENAMO-Electoral Union. In the 2004 elections the party gained 0.33% of the vote, and in 2009 the party received 0.50%.

In 2023, the leader was Joao Massango.
