= People's Party of Mozambique =

Political party in Mozambique

The People's Party of Mozambique (Portuguese: Partido Popular de Moçambique) is a political party in Mozambique. In 2009, the party was in a coalition with RENAMO and other small parties. In the 2019 legislative election, the party was the main part of the Renamo-UE electoral alliance, which won 21.48% of the popular vote and 60 out of 250 seats.
