= 2004 Mozambican general election =

- 1–2 December 2004
- Presidential election
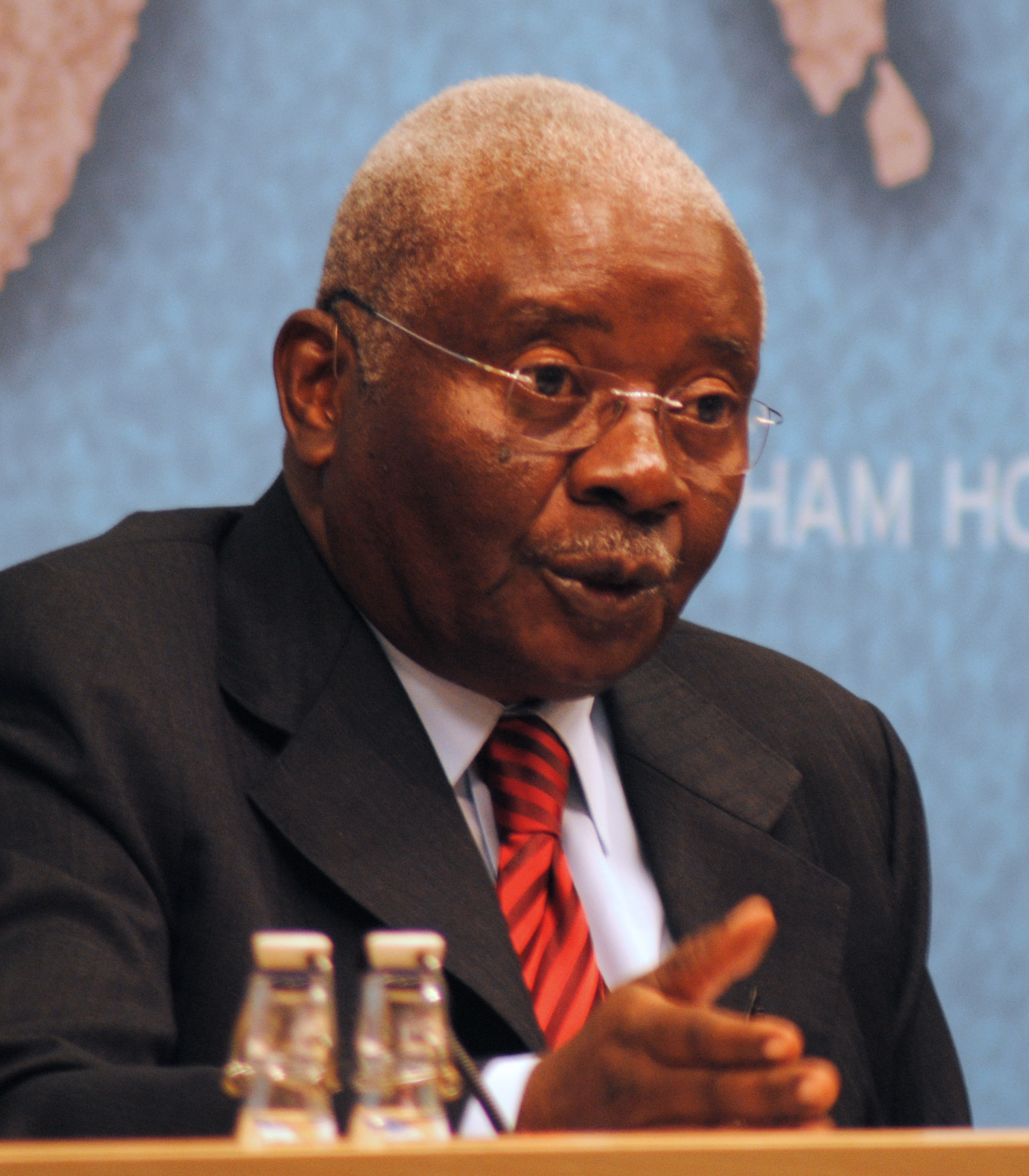

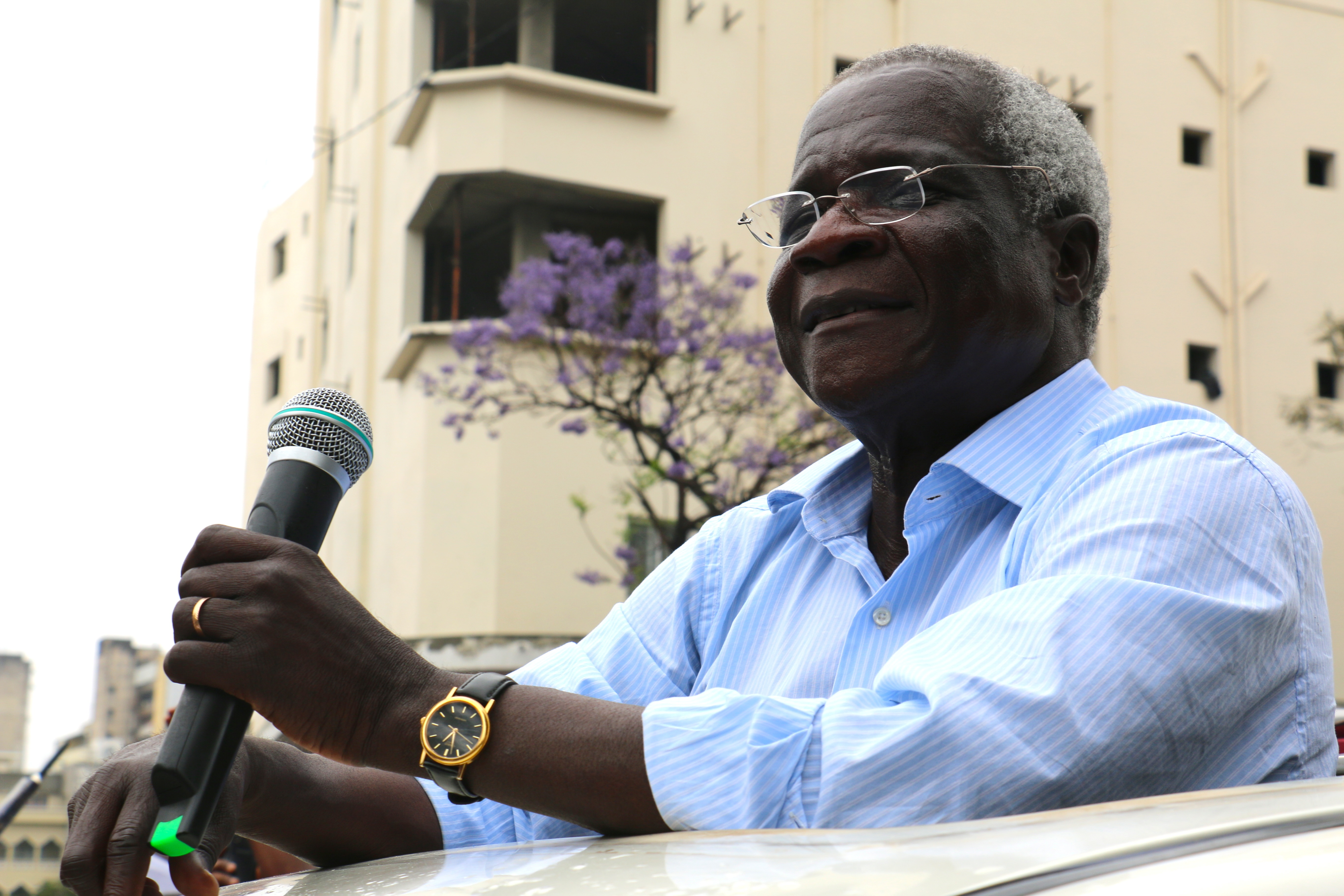
Nominee	Armando Guebuza	Afonso Dhlakama
Party	FRELIMO	RENAMO
Popular vote	2,004,226	998,059
Percentage	63.74%	31.74%
- Parliamentary election
Party	Leader	Vote %	Seats	+/–
FRELIMO	Armando Guebuza	62.03	160	+27
Renamo-UE	Afonso Dhlakama	29.73	90	−27
This lists parties that won seats. See the complete results below.
- Maps
President before election
Joaquim Chissano
FRELIMO
Elected President
Armando Guebuza
FRELIMO

General elections were held in Mozambique on 1 and 2 December 2004 to elect a president and the Assembly of the Republic. Incumbent president Joaquim Chissano stepped down after 18 years in power, with five candidates running to succeed him. Armando Guebuza of the ruling FRELIMO party won, with over 60% of the vote. FRELIMO also won the Assembly elections, taking 160 of the 250 seats. Turnout for both elections was just over 36%.

== Results ==
=== President ===
Officials expected the winner to be formally announced on 17 December, but it was delayed until 21 December. Guebuza won with 63.7% of the vote, and took office in February 2005. Afonso Dhlakama of RENAMO came second with 31.7% of the vote, and announced that he did not recognize the results.

Candidate	Party	Votes	%
Armando Guebuza	FRELIMO	2,004,226	63.74
Afonso Dhlakama	RENAMO	998,059	31.74
Raul Domingos	Party for Peace, Democracy, and Development	85,815	2.73
Yaqub Sibindy	Independent Party of Mozambique	28,656	0.91
Carlos Reis	United Front for Change and Good Governance	27,412	0.87
Total		3,144,168	100.00
Valid votes		3,144,168	94.44
Invalid/blank votes		184,999	5.56
Total votes		3,329,167	100.00
Registered voters/turnout		9,142,151	36.42
Source: Carter Center, IFES

=== Assembly ===
Party	Votes	%	Seats	+/–
FRELIMO	1,889,054	62.03	160	+27
Renamo-UE	905,289	29.73	90	–27
Party for Peace, Democracy, and Development	60,758	2.00	0	New
Party of Freedom and Solidarity	26,686	0.88	0	New
National Reconciliation Party	18,220	0.60	0	New
Independent Party of Mozambique	17,960	0.59	0	0
Mozambique Social Broadening Party	15,740	0.52	0	0
Labor Party	14,242	0.47	0	0
Social Liberal Party	13,915	0.46	0	0
Ecological Party-Land Movement	12,285	0.40	0	New
United Front for Change and Good Governance	11,059	0.36	0	New
Democratic Union	10,310	0.34	0	0
Party of Greens of Mozambique	9,950	0.33	0	New
Liberal and Democratic Party of Mozambique	9,263	0.30	0	0
Democratic Reconciliation Party	9,026	0.30	0	New
Union for the Salvation of Mozambique	8,661	0.28	0	New
Broad Opposition Front	7,591	0.25	0	New
Mozambique Democratic Liberal Party	3,720	0.12	0	0
United Congress of Democrats	1,252	0.04	0	New
People's Democratic Party	448	0.01	0	New
Total	3,045,429	100.00	250	0
Valid votes	3,045,429	91.68		
Invalid/blank votes	276,497	8.32		
Total votes	3,321,926	100.00		
Registered voters/turnout	9,142,151	36.34		
Source: EISA
