= 1999 Mozambican general election =

- 3–5 December 1999
- Presidential election
- Turnout: 69.51% (▼18.36pp)
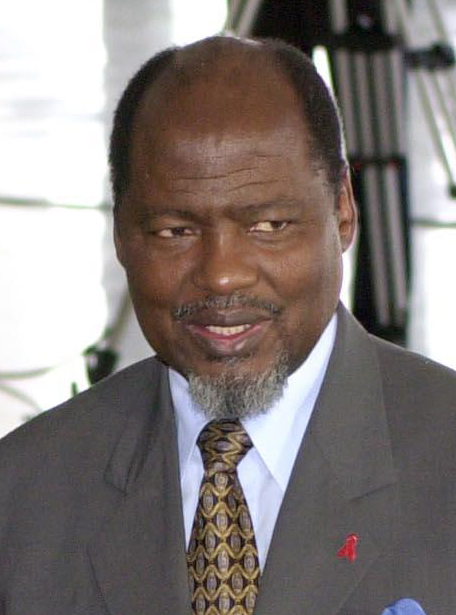

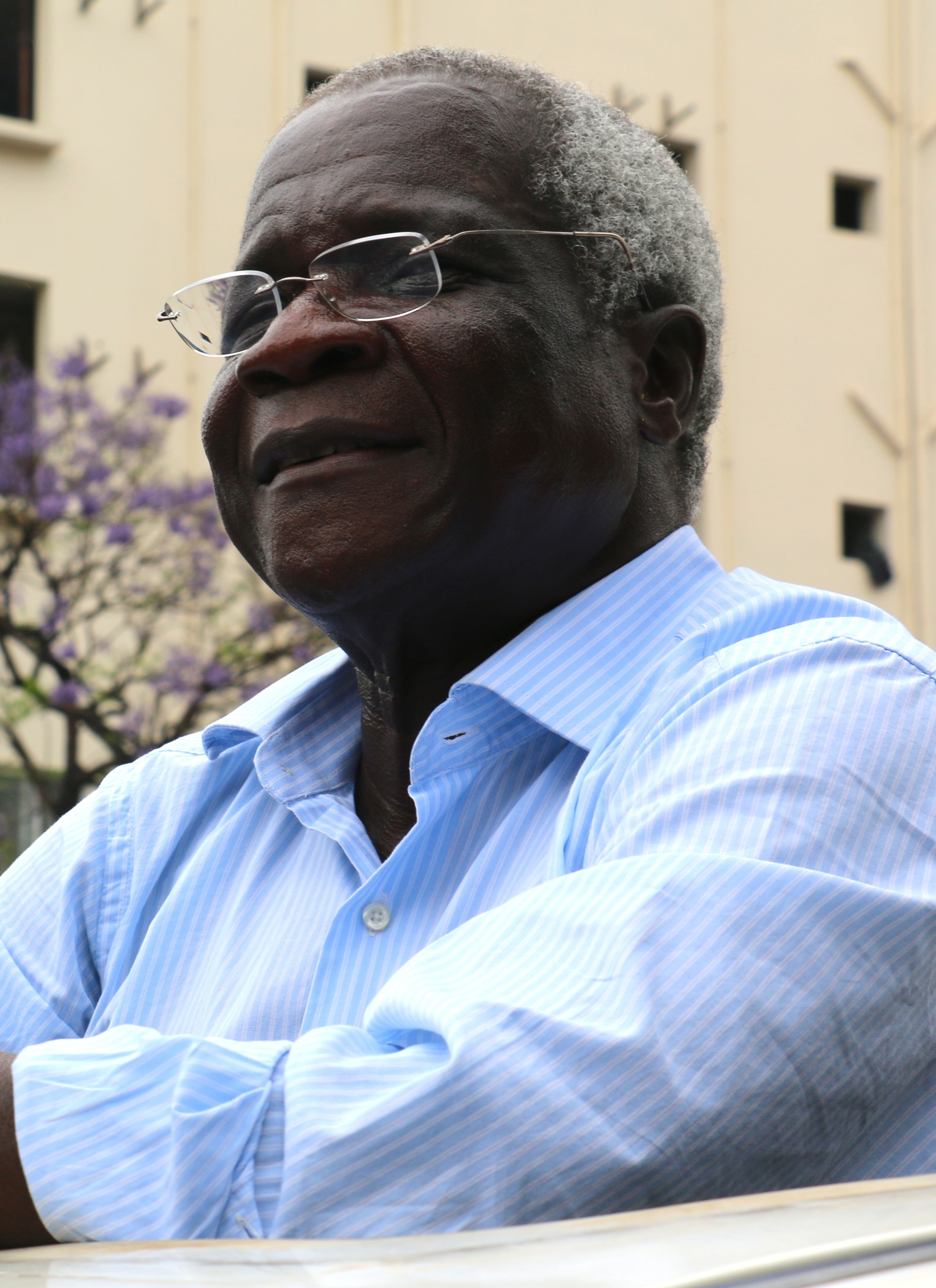
Nominee	Joaquim Chissano	Afonso Dhlakama
Party	FRELIMO	RENAMO
Popular vote	2,339,848	2,134,255
Percentage	52.30%	47.70%
- Parliamentary election
Party	Leader	Vote %	Seats	+/–
FRELIMO	Joaquim Chissano	48.55	133	+4
Renamo-UE	Afonso Dhlakama	38.79	117	+5
This lists parties that won seats. See the complete results below.
- Maps
President before election
Joaquim Chissano
FRELIMO
Elected President
Joaquim Chissano
FRELIMO

General elections were held in Mozambique between 3 and 5 December 1999 to elect a president and the Assembly of the Republic. Incumbent president Joaquim Chissano won a narrow victory against Afonso Dhlakama, whilst Chissano's FRELIMO party won the Assembly elections, taking 133 of the 250 seats. Voter turnout for the elections was around 68–70%.

== Results ==
=== President ===
Candidate	Party	Votes	%
Joaquim Chissano	FRELIMO	2,339,848	52.30
Afonso Dhlakama	RENAMO	2,134,255	47.70
Total		4,474,103	100.00
Valid votes		4,474,103	90.63
Invalid votes		141,690	2.87
Blank votes		320,955	6.50
Total votes		4,936,748	100.00
Registered voters/turnout		7,099,105	69.54
Source: CNE

=== Assembly ===
Party	Votes	%	Seats	+/–
FRELIMO	2,008,165	48.55	133	+4
Renamo-UE	1,604,470	38.79	117	+5
Labor Party	111,280	2.69	0	0
Liberal and Democratic Party of Mozambique	102,115	2.47	0	New
Social Liberal and Democratic Party	83,515	2.02	0	0
Mozambican Opposition Union	64,182	1.55	0	0
Democratic Union	61,276	1.48	0	−9
Democratic Liberal Party of Mozambique	33,247	0.80	0	New
Independent Party of Mozambique	29,456	0.71	0	0
National Workers and Peasants Party	24,615	0.60	0	New
Liberal Progress Party of Mozambique	11,684	0.28	0	New
Social Broadening Party of Mozambique	2,153	0.05	0	New
Total	4,136,158	100.00	250	0
Valid votes	4,136,158	85.79		
Invalid votes	222,330	4.61		
Blank votes	463,011	9.60		
Total votes	4,821,499	100.00		
Registered voters/turnout	7,099,105	67.92		
Source: CNE
