= Armando Guebuza =

President of Mozambique from 2005 to 2015

Armando Guebuza MEOPA
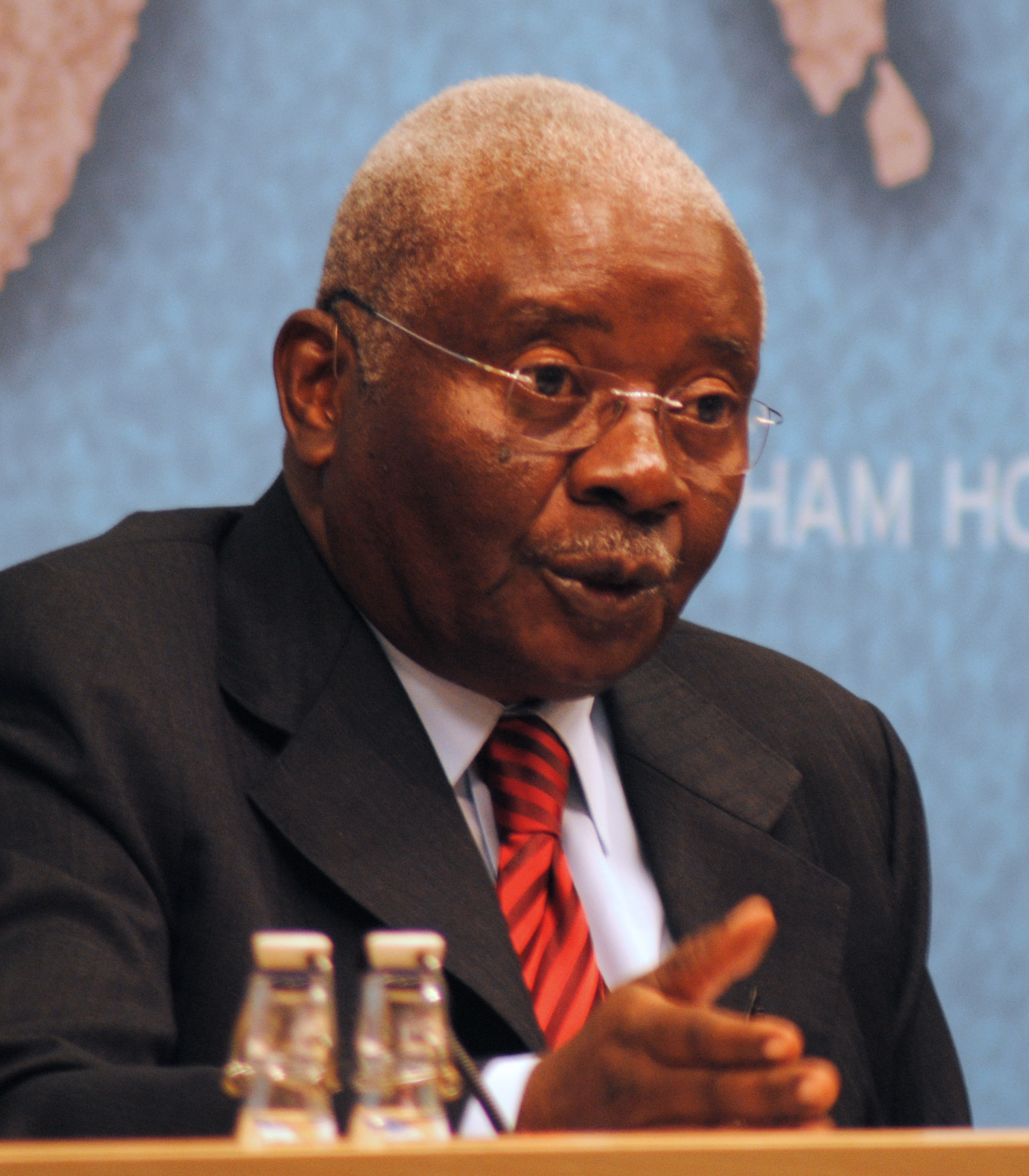
- Guebuza in 2012

3rd President of Mozambique
- In office 2 February 2005 – 15 January 2015
- Prime Minister: Luisa Diogo; Aires Ali; Alberto Vaquina
- Preceded by: Joaquim Chissano
- Succeeded by: Filipe Nyusi

Personal details
- Born: 20 January 1943 (age 83) Murrupula, Nampula; Portuguese Mozambique, (now Mozambique)
- Party: FRELIMO
- Spouse: Maria da Luz Guebuza
- Children: 5: Valentina (deceased); Armando; Ndambi; Norah; Mussumbuluko
- Nickname(s): Four by Four; Mr Guebusiness

Military service
- Allegiance: FRELIMO
- Branch/service: Paramilitary wing
- Rank: General
- Battles/wars: Mozambican War of Independence

Armando Emílio Guebuza (born 20 January 1943) is a Mozambican politician who was the President of Mozambique from 2005 to 2015.

== Career ==
Guebuza, born at Murrupula in Nampula Province, joined the Mozambique Liberation Front (FRELIMO) at the age of 20, shortly after it began Mozambique's war of independence against Portugal. By the time independence was achieved in 1975, Guebuza had become an important general and leader in FRELIMO.

He became interior minister in the Samora Machel government and issued an order forcing most Portuguese residents to leave within 24 hours, known as the 24/20 order because the residents in question were restricted to 20 kilograms of luggage.

During the 1980s Guebuza developed an unpopular program known as "Operation Production" in which jobless people from urban areas were moved to rural areas in the northern part of the country.

Following Machel's 1986 death in a plane crash in South Africa, Guebuza, a member of FRELIMO's Politburo, served briefly as part of a 10-member collective head of state. He was part of a committee investigating the circumstances of the crash, which came to no certain conclusion. He represented FRELIMO at the peace negotiations with the RENAMO guerrilla group that led to the Rome General Peace Accords, signed in Rome on 4 October 1992. During the transitional phase towards the first general elections in 1994, he represented the Government of Mozambique in the joint Supervision and Monitoring Commission, the highest implementing body of the General Peace Accords.

Following the abandonment of socialist economic policies by President Joaquim Chissano, which included the privatization of state companies, Guebuza became a successful and wealthy businessman, particularly in the construction, exports and fishing industries.

He was chosen as FRELIMO's presidential candidate in 2002 after a tough contest within the party. He became Secretary General of the party in the same year.

== President ==
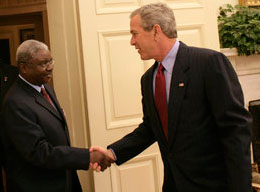
Armando Guebuza meets George Bush at the Oval Office, June 13, 2005

Guebuza was the candidate of FRELIMO for the December 2004 presidential elections, in which he won with 63.7% of the vote. He became president of Mozambique on 2 February 2005 and was re-elected for a second five-year term of office on 28 October 2009. Guebuza is the first man to enter the Mozambican presidency with a non-socialist party programme and ideology.

International observers to the elections criticized the fact that the National Electoral Commission (CNE) did not conduct fair and transparent elections. They listed a range of shortcomings by the electoral authorities that benefited the ruling party – FRELIMO.

== Personal interests ==
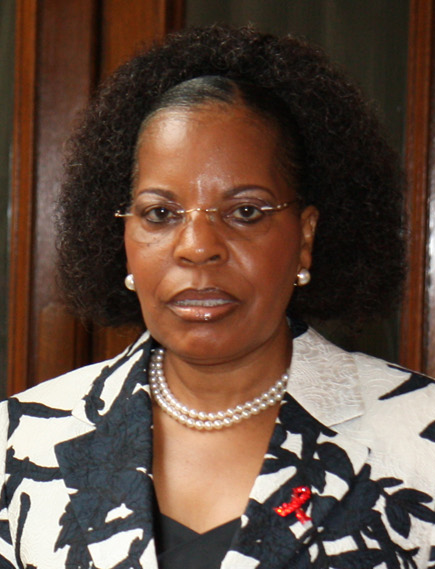
Maria da Luz Guebuza, the First Lady of Mozambique, in London (June 2014).

Armando Guebuza is one of the wealthiest individuals in Mozambique, which according to Marcelo Mosse has earned the president the nickname Mr Gue-Business: He was a shareholder of Laurentina, the first Mozambique brewery, and was one of the main shareholders in the Nosso Banco (formerly Banco Mercantil de Investimentos).

=== Eponyms ===
- Armando Emilio Guebuza Bridge, across the Zambezi River at Caia (2.3 km)

== See also ==
- List of heads of the executive by approval rating

Political offices
Preceded by Joaquim Chissano	President of Mozambique; 2005–2015	Succeeded by Filipe Nyusi
