= Afonso Dhlakama =

Mozambican politician (1953–2018)

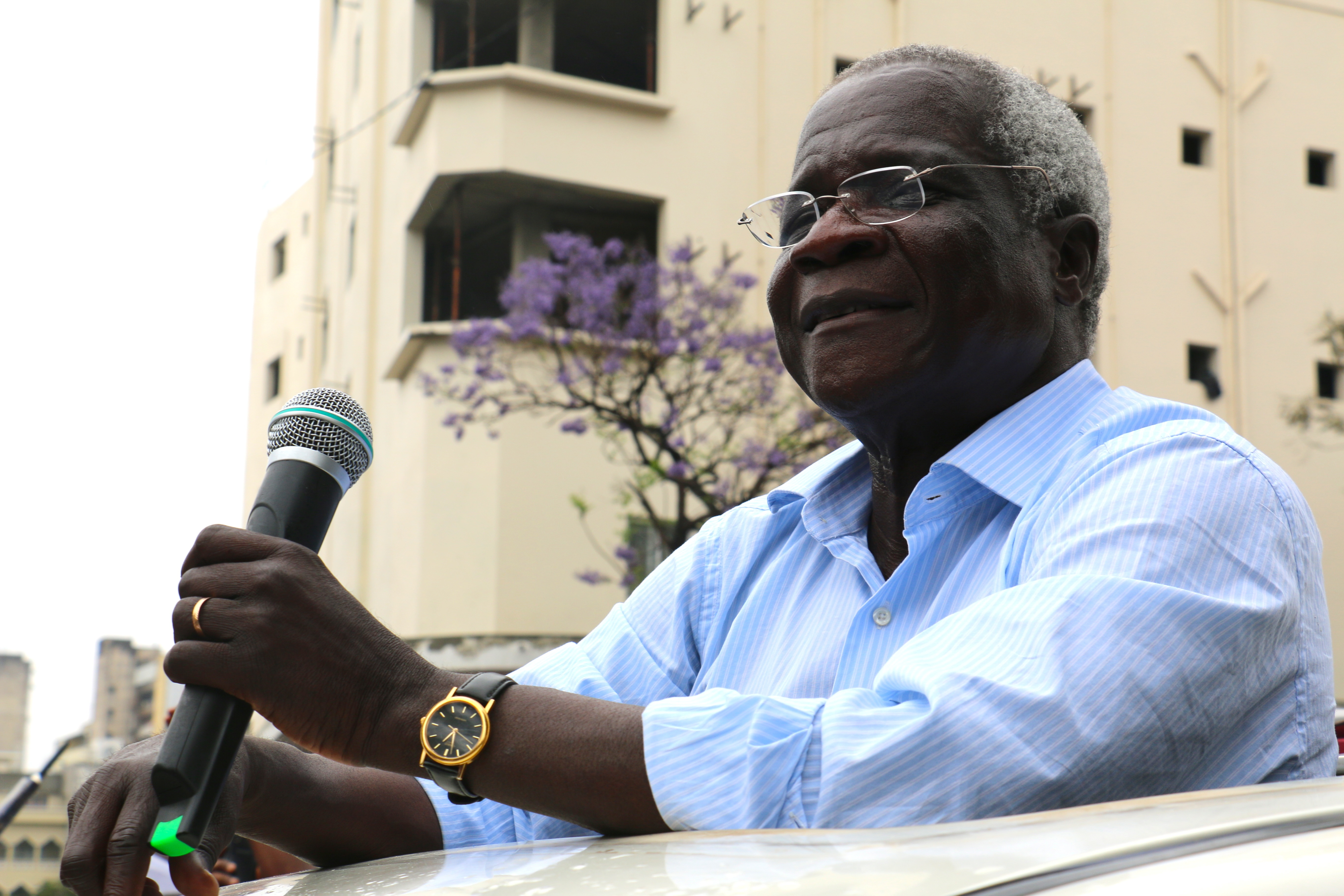

Leader of RENAMO
- In office 17 October 1979 – 3 May 2018
- Preceded by: André Matsangaissa
- Succeeded by: Ossufo Momade

Personal details
- Born: 1 January 1953 Mangunde, Sofala Province; Portuguese Mozambique
- Died: 3 May 2018 (aged 65) Gorongosa, Sofala Province, Mozambique
- Party: RENAMO

Afonso Marceta Macacho Dhlakama (1 January 1953 – 3 May 2018) was a Mozambican politician and the leader of RENAMO, an anti-communist guerrilla movement that fought the FRELIMO government in the Mozambican Civil War before signing a peace agreement and becoming an opposition political party in the early 1990s. Dhlakama was born in Mangunde, Sofala Province.

== Mozambican Civil War ==
After RENAMO's first leader, André Matsangaissa, was killed by Mozambican government forces in 1979, Dhlakama became leader. By 1984, Dhlakama was both commander in chief of RENAMO's forces and head of the governing body, the 12-member executive council. As leader of RENAMO Dhlakama sought to destabilise the FRELIMO government through guerilla strategies. Under his command, RENAMO reached the peak of its power, controlling large parts of the country, especially in the north and being able to carry out raids virtually anywhere outside the major cities. In its fight, RENAMO was supported by conservative circles in some western countries, including the United States, Portugal, the Brazilian right-wing military regime, and most importantly by the white led governments of Rhodesia and South Africa to whom FRELIMO-ruled Mozambique was a target due to its support of rebel movements within their countries. However, the end of the cold war, the collapse of Rhodesia's Smith government and, most importantly, the transition taking place in South Africa eventually deprived RENAMO of its financial supporters and arms suppliers. Thus, RENAMO and FRELIMO, which had also lost its supporters from the eastern power block, finally signed a peace treaty in October 1992. RENAMO subsequently transformed itself into a legal political party under the continued leadership of Afonso Dhlakama.

== Allegation of war crimes and crimes against humanity ==
According to the US State Department and some other sources, under Dhlakama's leadership RENAMO systematically committed crimes against humanity as part of its war effort. These include mass killing and mutilation of non-combatants during raids on villages and towns as well as systematically forcing civilians into RENAMO's employment, though FRELIMO had used similar methods during its fight against the Portuguese. What differed was the abduction of children to use them as child soldiers. It is estimated that one third of RENAMO forces were under 18. Abducted people also had to serve RENAMO in administrative or public service functions in the areas it controlled. Refusing to work for RENAMO would be punished by heavy beating or even on-the-spot execution as were flight attempts, though this was also used by FRELIMO. One particularly gruesome practice was the mutilation and killing of children left behind by escaped parents.

== Post-Civil War activity ==
=== Political activity ===
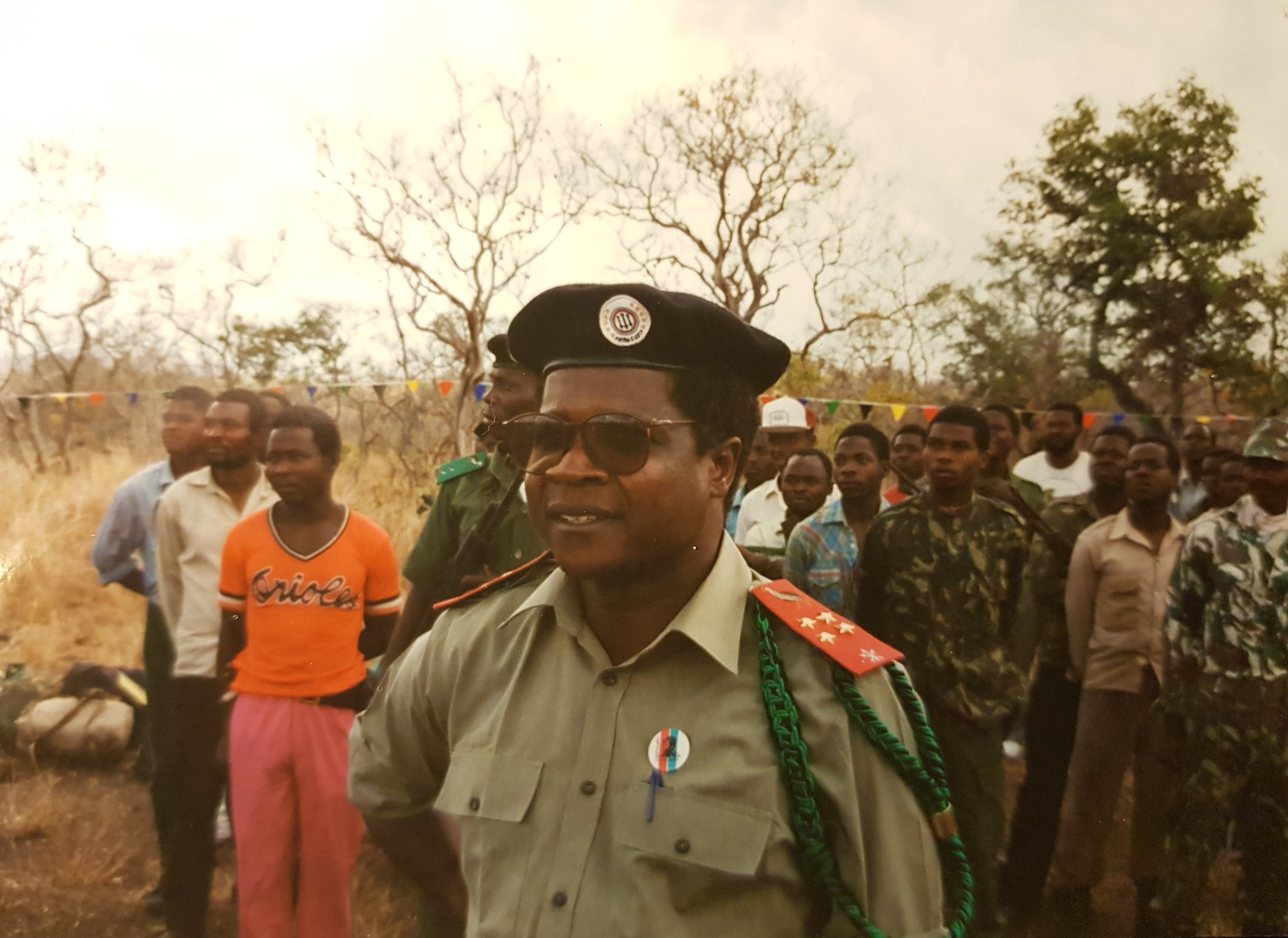
Dhlakama in 1993

Dhlakama has competed as the RENAMO candidate in all three multiparty presidential elections held in Mozambique. In 1994, he was defeated by incumbent president and FRELIMO candidate Joaquim Chissano by a margin of 53.3% to 33.7%. He received 47.7% of the vote in the 1999 presidential election with Chissano capturing 52.3%. In the December 2004 presidential election, he was defeated by FRELIMO candidate Armando Guebuza, who received 63.7% of the vote to his 31.7%.

International observers to the elections criticised the fact that the National Electoral Commission (CNE) did not conduct entirely fair and transparent elections. They listed a whole range of serious shortcomings by the electoral authorities that benefited the ruling party FRELIMO.

Upon the creation of the Council of State, a body tasked with advising the President, Dklahama was included on the Council due to his role as leader of the opposition; he and the other members of the council were sworn in on 23 December 2005. He said that he accepted his seat on the council for the sake of national stability.

Dhlakama was injured in a car crash in Maputo on 10 June 2007. A RENAMO spokesman described the injuries as minor.

Although RENAMO was apparently weakened by the defection of Daviz Simango, who formed a new party, Dhlakama was re-elected for another five-year term as RENAMO leader on 22 July 2009 at a party congress in Nampula Province, defeating another candidate, Rogerio Francisco Joao. He was RENAMO's candidate in the October 2009 presidential election.

=== War threats ===
Dhlakama repeatedly threatened to reestablish RENAMO's armed forces and to let the country "burn". In 2011 he stated that RENAMO was preparing a "revolution" to rid the government from power and establishing new barracks for this purpose.

In October 2012 Dhlakama relocated to RENAMO's former headquarters near Casa Banana in Gorongosa and set up a training camp for several hundred partially armed followers. He threatened to destroy the country if his political demands were not met. However, the local press considered this threat to be another bluff, doubting that Dhlakama had the means to start any serious insurrection.

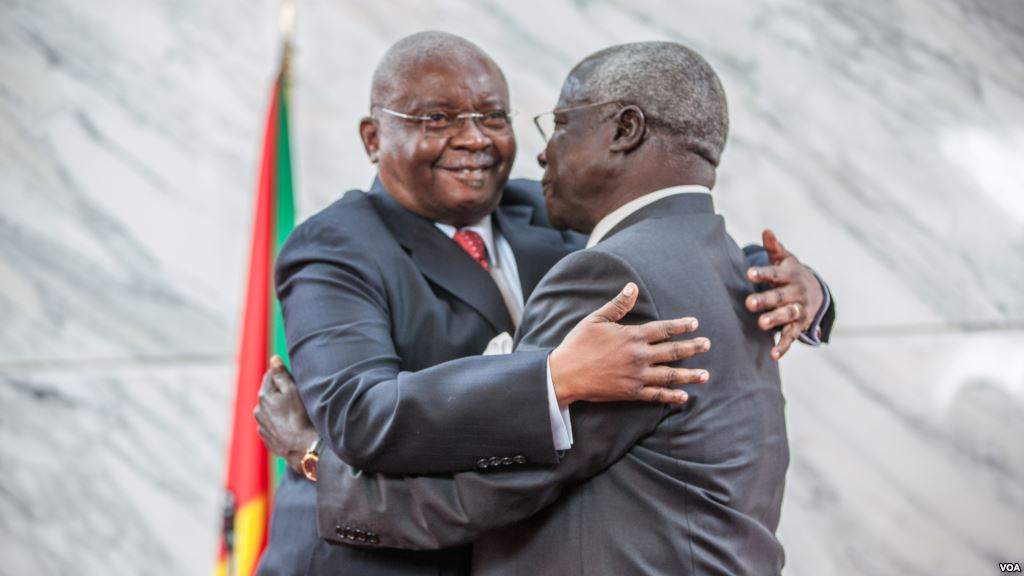
Dhlakama (right) ratifying a 2014 peace deal with Mozambique's President Armando Guebuza

In April 2013, Renamo militants attacked the riot police's headquarters in the central Mozambican town of Muxungue. Four policemen and a civilian were confirmed dead, while ten servicemen were hospitalised. According to the police, the leader of the attackers was also killed. The attackers were trying to free fifteen of their comrades who had been arrested in a police raid on a Renamo camp the day before. Police claimed that Renamo was conducting illegal military training at the camp. A Renamo spokesman pronounced that "Our demobilised soldiers will retaliate against any attack and not only in the location where it occurs, but across the entire country, including [...] Maputo." Dhlakama later confirmed that he had personally ordered the attack on the police post.

On 17 October 2013, suspected RENAMO guerrillas ambushed a military patrol near Gorongosa, RENAMO's stronghold, killing seven soldiers, according to local media. Further clashes followed and, in response, on 21 October, FADM forces captured Sathunjira base after days of combat. RENAMO spokesman Fernando Mazanga claimed that the government forces had shelled the base with heavy weapons (artillery), and that Dhlakama had fled the base. A RENAMO statement said that the capture of the base put an end to the 1992 peace deal.

=== 2014 peace process ===
On 5 September 2014 Dhlakama and president Guebuza signed a peace deal in an effort to end the two-year period of instability. The deal included integration of RENAMO forces into the army and a reform of the election oversight commission. However, after RENAMO's refusal to accept the 2014 presidential elections, problems in the implementation of the peace deal and after continued efforts by government forces to disarm RENAMO met resistance, Dhlakama broke off the peace process in August 2015. Since then there have been renewed clashes between government and RENAMO forces. Dhlakama claimed there were two attempts by the government to assassinate him.

== Death and impact ==
On 3 May 2018, Dhlakma died in Gorongosa after suffering a heart attack. An unnamed official in RENAMO acknowledged this and also stated that Dhlakma had been ill prior to his death. Regarding the future of RENAMO following Dhlakma's death, Ed Hobey Hamsher, an analyst with Maplecroft, stated that "no potential successor has Dhlakama's stature" and that anybody who succeeds him "will struggle to unify Renamo's factions." At the time of Dhlakma's death, the RENAMO Congress was unable to fix a date to vote on a successor. The next month on 14 June 2018, Ossufo Momade, who was picked to serve as the interim leader of RENAMO until the organization's Congress could vote on a permanent successor to Dhlakma, went into hiding.
