= Mexico–Mozambique relations =

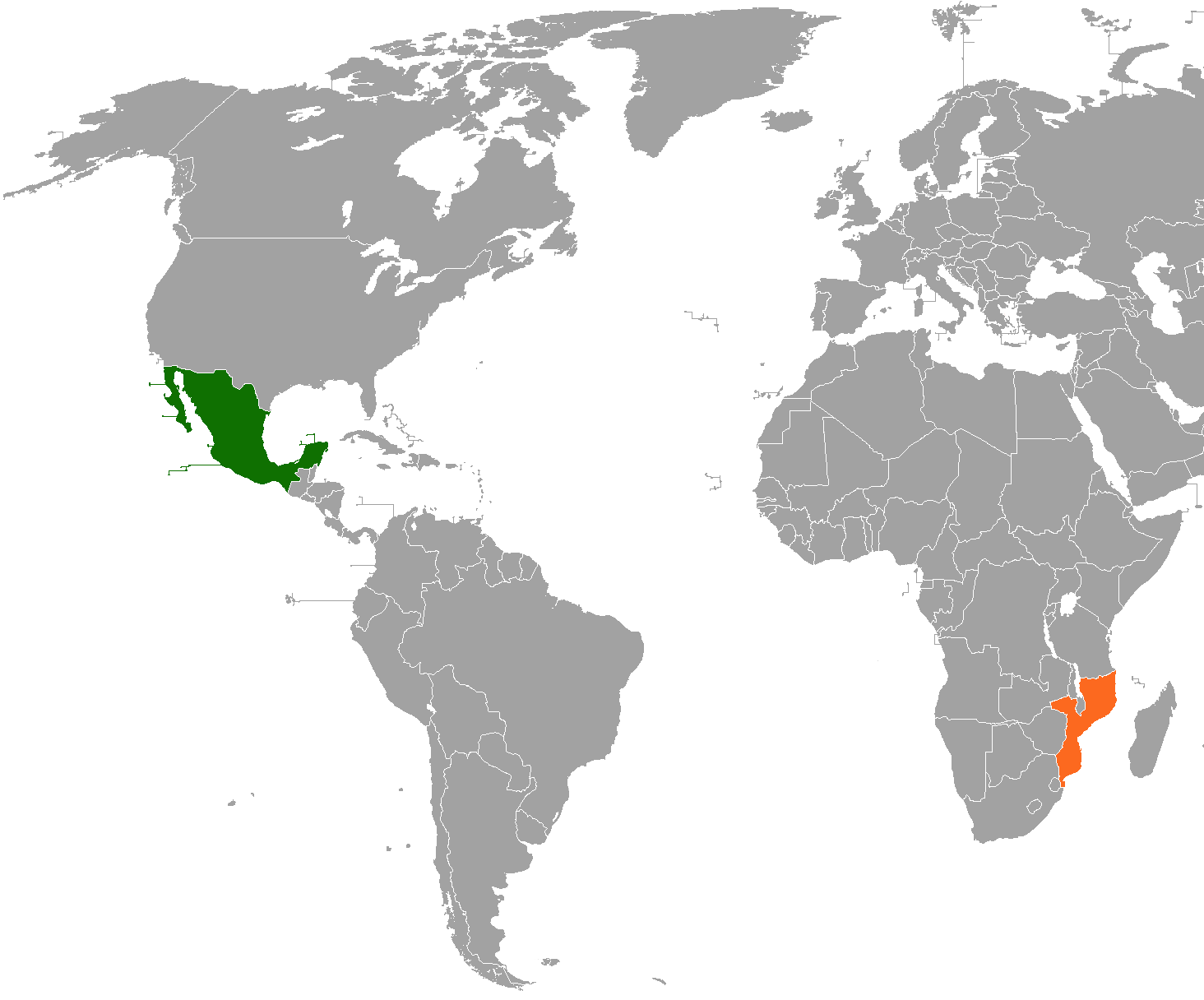

- Mexico: Mozambique

The nations of Mexico and Mozambique established diplomatic relations in 1988. Both nations are members of the United Nations.

== History ==
During the Atlantic slave trade, Portugal and Spain transported many enslaved people from Mozambique to Mexico where they arrived primarily to the port city of Veracruz. In June 1975, Mozambique gained its independence from Portugal. Mexico and Mozambique established diplomatic relations on 26 February 1988. Since the establishment of diplomatic relations; relations between both nations have taken place primarily in multilateral forums such as the United Nations.

In October 1986, Mexico called for an inquiry into the death of Mozambican President Samora Machel at the United Nations after his plane crashed in South Africa. In June 1999, Mexico Foreign Secretary Rosario Green met with Mozambican President Joaquim Chissano while both were attending the inauguration for South African President Thabo Mbeki in Pretoria.

In March 2002, Mozambican Prime Minister Pascoal Mocumbi paid a visit to Mexico to attend the Monterrey Consensus. During his visit, Prime Minister Mocumbi met with President Vicente Fox.

In December 2010, Mozambican Minister of the Environment, Alcinda Abreu, paid a visit to Mexico to attend the 2010 United Nations Climate Change Conference in Cancún. In October 2015, Mozambican Minister of Justice José Ibraimo Abudo paid a visit to Mexico and met with Mexico's National Human rights Commissioner, Luis Raúl González Pérez. During the visit, both nations agreed for joint activities to be developed in the field of protection and dissemination of human rights, training and advice between both nations.

In 2024, both nations celebrated 36 years of diplomatic relations.

== High-level visits ==
High-level visits from Mozambique to Mexico

- Prime Minister Pascoal Mocumbi (2002)
- Minister of the Environment Alcinda Abreu (2010)
- Minister of Justice José Ibraimo Abudo (2015)

== Bilateral agreements ==
In 2004, both nations signed an Agreement in Educational and Cultural Cooperation.

== Trade ==
In 2023, trade between both nations totaled US$24.1 million. Mexico's main exports to Mozambique include: medicines, chocolates and other candies, trailers and semi-trailers, valves and similar pipes, articles of iron or steel, and fish. Mozambique's main exports to Mexico include: aluminum cables, titanium ores and their concentrates, data processing machines, clothing, hides, minerals, and precious stones.

== Diplomatic missions ==
- Mexico is accredited to Mozambique from its embassy in Pretoria, South Africa.
- Mozambique is accredited to Mexico from its embassy in Washington, D.C., United States.
