= José Condungua Pacheco =

Mozambican politician

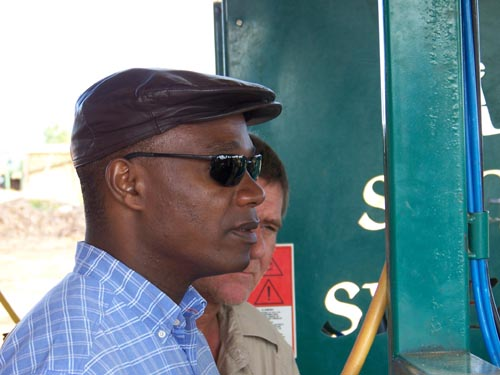
- June 2025, Director General SISE

Minister of Foreign Affairs
- In office 2017–2020
- President: Filipe Nyusi
- Prime Minister: Carlos Agostinho do Rosário
- Preceded by: Oldemiro Balói
- Succeeded by: Verónica Macamo

Minister of Agriculture and Fisheries
- In office 2010–2017
- President: Armando Guebuza, Filipe Nyusi
- Prime Minister: Aires Ali, Alberto Vaquina, Carlos Agostinho do Rosário

Minister of the Interior
- In office 2005–2009
- President: Armando Guebuza
- Prime Minister: Luísa Diogo

Governor of Cabo Delgado Province
- In office 1998–2005
- President: Joaquim Chissano, Armando Guebuza
- Prime Minister: Pascoal Mocumbi, Luísa Diogo

Personal details
- Born: 10 September 1958 (age 67) Sofala Province, Portuguese Mozambique
- Awards: Eduardo Mondlane Order

José Condungua Pacheco (born 10 September 1958 in Sofala Province) is a Mozambican politician who was the Minister of Foreign Affairs for Mozambique between 2017 and 2020. He previously served as minister of Agriculture from 2010 to 2017; Minister of the interior from 2005 to 2009. Pacheco was governor of Cabo Delgado Province from 1998 to 2005 and vice minister of agriculture from 1995 to 1998. He is a certified agricultural technology engineer.
