= Leonardo Simão =

Mozambican politician

Leonardo Simão (born 5 June 1953) is a Mozambican politician. Simão joined the FRELIMO government in 1982 as the Director of Health in Zambezia. In 1986, he became the Minister of Health, remaining in that role until the 1994 election when he was elected to parliament. In December 1994, Simão became the Minister of Foreign Affairs and Cooperation of Mozambique under Joaquim Chissano, until February 2005 when Armando Guebuza, also of FRELIMO, became President, replacing Simão with Oldemiro Baloi.

In 2023 Dr Leonardo Santos Simão, was appointed as Special Representative of the Secretary General of the United Nations for West Africa.

== Sources ==
- Leonardo Simão on Africa Database
