= Esperança Bias =

Mozambican politician

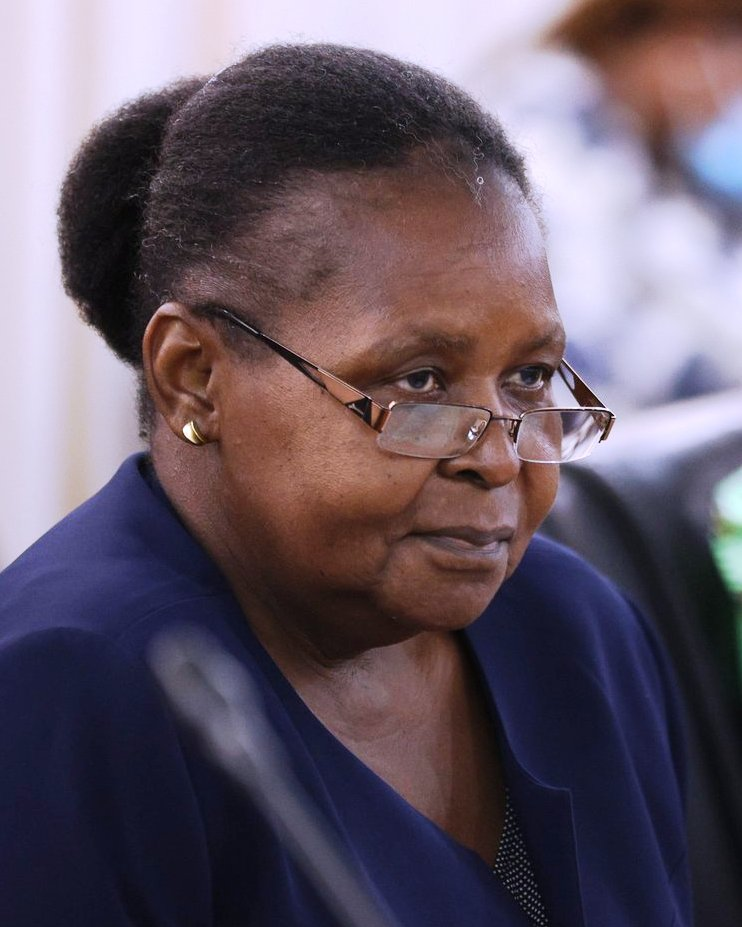
- Bias in 2022

President of the Assembly of the Republic
- In office 13 January 2020 – 13 January 2025
- Preceded by: Verónica Macamo
- Succeeded by: Margarida Talapa

Personal details
- Born: Esperança Laurinda Francisco Nhiuane Bias; 28 July 1958
- Political party: FRELIMO

Esperança Bias (born 28 July 1958) is a Mozambican politician. She is a graduate of the Faculty of Economy at the Eduardo Mondlane University. From 1999 to 2005, she served as the Deputy Minister of Mineral Resources (beginning in 1999). From 2005 to 2015, she served as Mozambique's Minister of Mineral Resources. In 2015, incoming president Filipe Nyusi replaced her with Pedro Conceição Couto.

In February 2016, she was elected to the Secretariat of Mozambique's FRELIMO party as Secretary for Administration and Finance.

She was Speaker of the Assembly of the Republic from January 2020 to January 2025.

Political offices
Preceded by	Minister of Mineral Resources and Energy; 2005–2015	Succeeded by Pedro Conceição Couto
