= Cidália Chaúque Oliveira =

Mozambican politician

Cidália Manuel Chaúque Oliveira (born 1972) is a Mozambican politician. In January 2015 Filipe Nyusi appointed her Minister of Gender, Children and Social Welfare in the Cabinet of Mozambique.
