= Júlio Eduardo Zamith Carrilho =

Mozambican politician (1946–2021)

- Born: June 26, 1946; Pemba, Mozambique
- Died: December 5, 2021 (aged 75); Maputo, Mozambique

Júlio Eduardo Zamith Carrilho (Pemba, 26 June 1946 – Maputo, 5 December 2021) was a Mozambican politician, long-time member of FRELIMO, as well as a university professor and author. Carrilho started his professional career as an architectural draftsman in a private architecture office in his hometown of Pemba. He moved to Lisbon in 1971 to study for his undergraduate degree (Licenciatura) in Architecture at the University of Lisbon (Escola Superior the Belas-Artes), which he completed in 1973. He held a PhD in Architecture and Environment from the Sapienza University of Rome (2006). He lived briefly in Sweden, where he fled to escape the Portuguese secret police PIDE, then returning to Maputo in September 1974, at the age of 28. Already a member of FRELIMO then, he was appointed to the Transition Government as the Secretary of State for Public Works and Housing, transitioning to the office of Minister for Public Works and Housing in the first government of independent Mozambique. He held this post between 1975 and 1978, 1980–1983 and 1983–1987, the latter as the Minister of Construction and Water. He also served as Minister of Industry and Energy between 1978 and 1980.

As the Minister of Public Works and Housing, he was responsible for overseeing the implementation in 1976 of FRELIMO's decision to nationalize all rental units in all Mozambican cities. Initially targeting only the apartment buildings within the colonial urban core of cities, known as 'cidade de cimento' (the cement city), the decision was interpreted by the population as extending also to all rental units, including those in 'subúrbios' (loosely translated as 'the suburbs'), the areas where the vast majority of the African population lived in colonial times.

He had five children – André, Elga, Katia, Ntzanzi, and Taila. André Carrilho is the son of Portuguese architect Isabel Maria de Sá Machado. Júlio Carrilho was married to Fernanda Machungo, an obstetrician and gynaecologist, who he met after joining FRELIMO. She is the sister of the late Mário da Graça Machungo, a FRELIMO politician who held various government offices since the Transition Government in 1974, including the office of Prime Minister of Mozambique (1986–1994).

Júlio Carrilho taught at the Faculty of Architecture and Physical Planning of Eduardo Mondlane University since 1993 until his retirement.

Júlio Carrilho is the author of the book Ibo: A Casa e o Tempo (2005) about the architecture of Mozambican island of Ibo.
