= Council of Ministers (Mozambique) =

The Council of Ministers is part of the executive branch of the Mozambican government. The Council currently consists of 20 members; The President, Prime Minister, and 18 ministers. Each minister is the leader of a different ministry. The Prime Minister is the leader of the Council of Ministers and oversees all ministry operations, the Prime Minister and Ministers are all appointed by the president.

The size of the Council of ministers changes frequently. When the President is elected they decide how large their council will be. The current president, Daniel Chapo, started out with 12 ministers and has appointed six more since then. He also plans to appoint two more but they have not been announced yet.

== History ==
The Council of ministers was established following the country's independence from Portugal on June 25, 1975, as part of the newly formed government of the People's Republic of Mozambique, led by the Front for the Liberation of Mozambique (FRELIMO).

=== 1975-1990: One Party Socialist period ===
During this period, Mozambique operated under a one-party system governed by FRELIMO, which adopted a Marxist-Leninist political orientation. The council of ministers operated directly under the control of the party, all ministers were appointed and accountable to the central executives. Policy decisions were made by the Council collectively but usually aligned with the directives of the FRELIMO central ideas. At this point the members of the council were exclusively party members and all state governance was centralized.

=== 1990-1992: Constitutional Reform ===
In 1990, Mozambique introduced a new constitution that officially ended the one party system and created a multiparty democracy, freedom of speech, and a market based economy. The new constitution also created a clearer separation of powers between the executive, judicial, and legislative branches. The Council of ministers continues to carry out executive orders but they now had to be more transparent and accountable.

=== Post 1992: Peace and Liberalization ===
Following the Rome General Peace Accords, which ended the Mozambican civil war, the country had their first multiparty elections in 1994. Multiple parties became prominent but FRELIMO was still the dominant party. The council of ministers continued to be the primary executive body, but the composition varied due to presidential appointments. The structure and responsibilities have changed over time often reflecting the priorities of the current government. Despite constitutional reforms and increased competition, FRELIMO has maintained significant control over the executive branch.

== Current Ministers ==
Ministry	Current minister
Agriculture, Environment, and Fisheries	Roberto Albino
Communications and Digital Transformation	Américo Muchanga
Economy	Basílio Muhate
Education and Culture	Samaria dos Anjos Filemon Tovela
Economy and Finance	Carla Louveira
Foreign Affairs and Cooperation	Maria Manuela Lucas
Health	Ussene Isse
Interior	Paulo Chachine
Justice, Constitutional and Religious Affairs	Mateus Finiasse Saize
Labour, Gender, and Social Action	Ivete Ferrao Alane
Mineral Resources and Energy	Estevão Pale
National Defense	Cristóvão Chume
Planning and Development	Salim Valá
Public Works, Housing, and Water Resources	Fernando Rafael
State Administration and Civil Service	Inocêncio Impissa
Transport and Logistics	João Matlombe
Veterans’ Affairs	Nyeleti Brooke Mondlane
Youth and Sports	Caifadine Manasse

== See also ==
- Politics of Mozambique
