= Minister of Mineral Resources and Energy (Mozambique) =

The Minister of Mineral Resources and Energy (Portuguese: Ministro dos Recursos Minerais e Energia) is a cabinet-level position in the national government of Mozambique. The minister oversees policymaking, operation and development of mineral resources and energy. The Ministry of Mineral Resources and Energy, colloquially known for its acronym MIREME, was first created in 1994. After independence, between 1975 and 1983, the portfolios of energy and mineral resources were under the ministry responsible for industry. Between 1983 and 1994, mineral resources and energy were allocated to separate ministries. They were briefly separated again between 2005 and 2015.

== Ministers of Mineral Resources and Energy (since 1994) ==
- John Kachamila, 1994-2000
- Castigo Langa, 2000-2005
- Salvador Namburete (Minister of Energy), 2005-2010 and 2010-2015
- Esperança Bias (Minister of Mineral Resources), 2005-2010 and 2010-2015
- Pedro Couto, 2015-2016
- Letícia Klemens, 2016-2017
- Ernesto Max Elias Tonela, 2017-2022
- Carlos Zacarias, 2022-...

== Ministers responsible for the Energy portfolio (1975–1994) ==
- Mário Machungo (Minister of Industry and Commerce), 1975-1976
- Mário Machungo (Minister of Industry and Energy), 1976-1978
- Júlio Carrilho (Ministry of Industry and Energy), 1978-1980
- António Branco (Ministry of Industry and Energy), 1980–1986, 1986-1990 and 1990-1991
- Octávio Filiano Muthemba (Ministry of Industry and Energy), 1991-1994

== Ministers responsible for the Mineral Resources portfolio (1975–1994) ==
- Mário Machungo (Ministry of Industry and Commerce), 1975-1976
- Mário Machungo (Ministry of Industry and Energy), 1976-1978
- Júlio Carrilho (Ministry of Industry and Energy), 1978-1980
- António Branco (Minister of Industry and Energy), 1980-1983
- José Carlos Lobo (Minister of Mineral Resources), 1983-1984
- Abdul Magid Osman (Minister of Mineral Resources), 1984-1986
- John Kachamila (Minister of Mineral Resources), 1986-1994
