= Eduardo Joaquim Mulémbwè =

Mozambican politician

President of the Assembly of the Republic
- In office 12 January 1995 – 12 January 2010
- Preceded by: Marcelino dos Santos
- Succeeded by: Verónica Macamo

Personal details
- Political party: FRELIMO

Eduardo Joaquim Mulémbwè is a politician from Mozambique. He is a member of the FRELIMO party and president of the Assembly of the Republic of Mozambique from 1994 to 2009. He is also a member of the Pan-African Parliament.
