= Verónica Macamo =

Mozambican politician (born 1957)

Verónica Nataniel Macamo Dlhovo
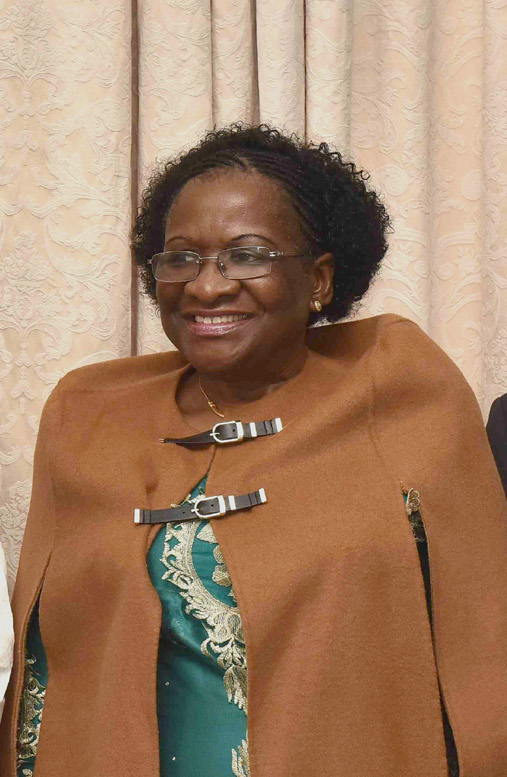

Minister of Foreign Affairs
- In office 15 January 2020 – 15 January 2025
- President: Filipe Nyusi
- Preceded by: José Condungua Pacheco
- Succeeded by: Maria Manuela Lucas

President of the Assembly of the Republic
- In office 12 January 2010 – 13 January 2020
- Preceded by: Eduardo Mulémbwè
- Succeeded by: Esperança Bias

Personal details
- Born: 13 November 1957 (age 67)
- Political party: FRELIMO

Verónica Nataniel Macamo Dlhovo (born November 13, 1957) is a Mozambican politician who has served as the Minister of Foreign Affairs since 2020. She served as the President of the Assembly of the Republic of Mozambique from 2010 to 2020. Dlhovo is a member of Frelimo.

She started her career as a politician in Gaza Province as a member of Organization of Mozambican Women and got to the peak of her career when she became the first female president of the Assembly since Mozambique gained independence.

== Early life, education and personal life ==
Veronica Nataniel Macamo Dlhovo was born on 13 November 1957, in Bilene, Gaza Province. She is married and has 3 children. Dlhovo earned a degree in Law from the Eduardo Mondlane University in 1994.

== Work experience and politics ==
Dlhovo started working for Frelimo even before independence and after Mozambique became independent, she worked in many areas for the party. She has been involved in social work working in the Political Commission of the Military Political Preparation in Moamba 1975 to 1977, as the Legal Advisor of Companies since 1994, Councilor for Justice from 2005 to 2007, and as Justice Counselor and Chairman of the Board of the Tourism Fund from 2000 to 2009. She also worked with women's organizations working as the Nacional Secretary for Formation of the Organization of Mozambican Women from 1985 to 1989, she was elected the Honorary Member of the Mozambican Women's Organization and Head of the Women's Department at Headquarters of the Central Committee, from 1994 to 1995. As a politician, Dlhovo was elected to the assembly in 1999 from the Gaza Province. In 1999 she was elected the Vice-President of the National Assembly. In 2004, she was elected as a member of the Pan-African Parliament from Mozambique.

Dlhovo was elected as the first female president of the Assembly in 2010, with 192 total votes out of 194. As the President of the assembly, Dlhovo was known for her strong personality. She gave her opinion in topics related to politics in Mozambique and played an important role in the creation of laws, including laws concerning teenage marriage and child abuse. She was re-elected as speaker in 2015.

On 17 January 2020, president Filipe Nyusi appointed her as the Minister of Foreign Affairs in his new cabinet.

== Sources ==
- Results of the 1999 Legislative election in Mozambique
