= Minister of Foreign Affairs (Mozambique) =

Minister of Foreign Affairs and Cooperation (Portuguese: Ministro dos Negócios Estrangeiros e Cooperação) is a cabinet level position in the national government of Mozambique.

== List of ministers ==
- 1975–1987: Joaquim Chissano
- 1987–1994: Pascoal Mocumbi
- 1994–2005: Leonardo Simão
- 2005–2008: Alcinda Abreu
- 2008–2017: Oldemiro Balói
- 2017–2020: José Condungua Pacheco
- 2020–2025: Verónica Macamo
- 2025–present: Maria Manuela Lucas
