= Politics of Mozambique =

Politics in Mozambique takes place in a framework of a semi-presidential representative democratic republic, whereby the President of Mozambique is head of state and head of government in a multi-party system. Executive power is exercised by the Prime Minister, Council of Ministers, and the President of the Republic. The Assembly of the Republic is the country's only national legislative chamber. The judiciary branch has the Constitutional Council, the highest court on Constitutional issues; the Administrative Tribunal, the highest court on administration matters; and the Supreme Court, the highest criminal and civil court. The judiciary is managed by the Superior Council of the Judiciary.

In their 2024 report, the Economist Democracy Index classified Mozambique as an authoritarian regime due to election manipulation. Observers from organizations like the European Union and Carter Foundation have found election irregularities. Opposition parties often allege election fraud. The 2024 national election saw a surge of demonstrations and police violence towards protestors. FRELIMO has been and currently remains the country's ruling party. Mozambique has faced insurgencies both from RENAMO, one of the opposition political parties, and Al-Shabaab, a jihadist militant group. Mozambique has ratified several international treaties, is a member of the Southern African Economic Partnership Agreement, and participates in international organizations such as the World Health Organization, Interpol, and the Commonwealth of Nations.

== Civil war and transition to democracy ==
Portuguese colonial rule ended in 1974 following the decade long Mozambican War of Independence. The conflict was originally led by Eduardo Mondlane until his assassination in 1969. Mozambique declared its independence in 1975. The military campaign leaders of Frente de Libertação de Moçambique (FRELIMO) quickly formed a one-party state allied with the Soviet bloc. Under FRELIMO's leadership, political pluralism, religious educational institutions, and the role of traditional leaders came to an end. Due to the group splitting into several factions along with its lack of respect for spiritual and traditional leadership, over 85 percent of the population did not recognize FRELIMO's rule as legitimate.

Armando Guebuza ordered Mozambique's Portuguese population to leave the country within 24 hours. Since they were only permitted to carry 20 kilograms of belongings, they had to leave behind most of their assets. Those who returned to Portugal were derided for their poverty since aiding them was seen as a drain on the country's limited resources. Many of the returning refugees went on to commit suicide.

FRELIMO's government supported both the South African (ANC) and Zimbabwean (ZANU-PF) guerrilla movements by providing food and shelter. The governments of apartheid South Africa and Rhodesia funded an armed rebel movement in central Mozambique called the Mozambican National Resistance (RENAMO). RENAMO was opposed to FRELIMO's Marxist autocratic government; their goal was to force FRELIMO to bring about democratic multiparty elections. By 1980, RENAMO came under the control of South Africa's military intelligence. The U.S. State Department describes this period as, "Civil war, sabotage from neighboring states, and economic collapse characterised the first decade of Mozambican independence."

RENAMO exploited FRELIMO's lack of respect towards religion and farmers to gain popularity in rural regions. However, RENAMO was also strongly disliked due to its violent methods to gain control of the civilization population, giving it a reputation as a "parasite army" internationally.

The Mozambican Civil War ravaged the countries infrastructure. Between 1977 and 1992, about a million people died as a result of fighting or famine. 1.7 million fled to surrounding nations, and six million more people were displaced within Mozambique. During the third FRELIMO party congress in 1983, President Samora Machel acknowledged that socialism had failed as well as the need for political and economic reform. Progress would be hindered by a plane crash three years later that killed Machel and several advisors.

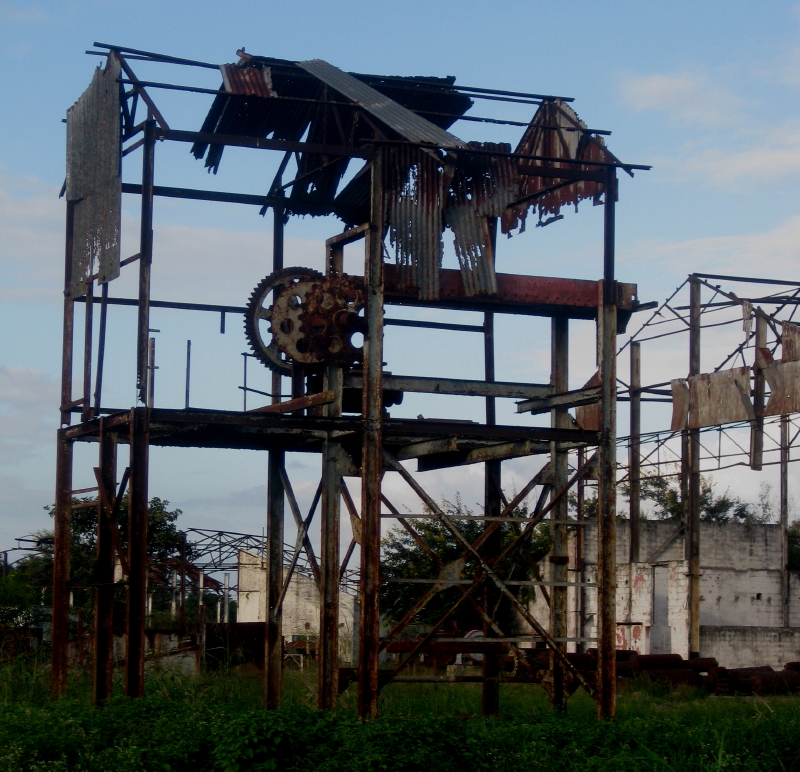
Ruins of Luabo, a town destroyed in the midst of the civil war which remains in disrepair decades later

Joaquim Chissano continued political reforms, including starting peace talks with RENAMO. In November 1990, a new constitution set up for the nation a democratic multi-party system with a market-based economy. The Mozambican Civil War ended on October 4, 1992, with an agreement brokered by the United Nations known as the Rome General Peace Accords.

Mozambique's first democratic election was held in 1994; Chissano was elected as President of the Republic. The elections for the Assembly of the Republic (the nation's parliament) resulted in 129 FRELIMO deputies, 112 RENAMO deputies, and 9 deputies from minor parties becoming members of the assembly. By mid-1995, the over 1.7 million Mozambican refugees who sought asylum in neighboring countries returned. It was the largest repatriation in Sub-Saharan Africa. 4 million Mozambicans who were internally displaced during the war returned to their places of origin. The ONUMOZ peacekeeping force of the United Nations supervised to ensure peace was maintained.

The modern Constitution of Mozambique was adopted in November 2004. It came into effect in January 2005 and created the Constitutional Council, Ombudsman, and Council of State.

== Executive branch ==
Main office-holders
Office	Name	Party	Since
President	Daniel Chapo	FRELIMO	15 January 2025
Prime Minister	Maria Benvinda Levy	FRELIMO	15 January 2025

The Constitution of Mozambique stipulates that the President of the Republic functions as the head of state, head of government, commander-in-chief of the armed forces, and as a symbol of national unity. He is directly elected for a five-year term via run-off voting; if no candidate receives more than half of the votes cast in the first round of voting, a second round of voting will be held in which only the two candidates who received the highest number of votes in the first round will participate, and whichever of the candidates obtains a majority of votes in the second round will thus be elected president.

The President of the Republic is advised by the Council of State, a body which consists of the Ombudsman, the Prime Minister, the President of the Constitutional Council, previous Presidents of the Republic, the former President (speaker) of the Assembly of the Republic, seven council members elected by the Assembly of the Republic, four appointees chosen by the President of the Republic, and the runner up for President of the Republic in the elections.

The Prime Minister is appointed by the President. His functions include convening and chairing the Council of Ministers (cabinet) who assist the President in governing the country and coordinate the functions of the other ministries. The Council of Ministers powers include the following: sign, ratify, follow, or end international agreements; supervise provincial, district, and local governments; draft bills to the Assembly of the Republic; pass decreed laws (subject to the assembly's ratification or refusal); defend the government's property and land; regulate economic and social sector activity; promote entrepreneurship and the development of co-operatives; ensure public order, social discipline, and the rights and freedoms of citizens; guide, direct, and regulate the country's representative bodies; create the Economic and Social Plan; create the State's Budget; and implement the State's Budget and Economic and Social Plan once they are approved by the Assembly of the Republic. The Council of Ministers also directs government sectors (especially health and education), labor policy, social security policy, and housing.

== Legislative branch ==
The legislature of Mozambique's national government is unicamerical, so the Assembly of the Republic (Assembleia da República) is the only legislative chamber. It has 250 members, elected for a five-year term by proportional representation. A political party or coalition must get at least five percent of the vote to be eligible for a seat in the Assembly of the Republic.

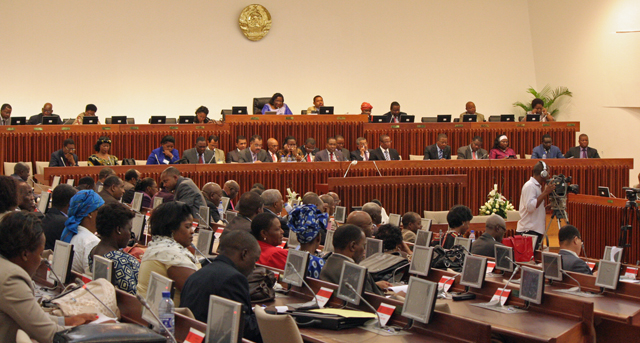
Photo of the Assembly of the Republic (2015)

The Speaker of the Assembly of the Republic (also called the President of the Assembly of the Republic) is elected among the members of the assembly through the assembly's vote. The speaker is responsible for convening the assembly and its Standing Commission; representing the assembly publicly and internationally; signing laws before submitting them for enactment; promoting relations between the Assembly of the Republic and provincial assemblies; ordering and signing public resolutions from the assembly, and ensuring compliance with the assembly's decisions. Vice Presidents of the Assembly of the Republic are nominated by the parties with the greatest representation in the assembly, then elected by the assembly members. They can take up the speaker's duties in the case of absence or disability. The latest Speaker of the Assembly of the Republic is Margarida Ambugy Talapa, whose term started in January 2025.

Legislation can be introduced by individual members, parliamentary committees or groups, the President, and government members. Legislation is most often proposed by the executive branch. It is passed by simple majority vote.

The assembly has eight departmental commissions/committees: Constitutional Affairs, Human Rights and Legality; International Relations; Petitions; Planning and Budget; Social Affairs, Gender and Environmental; Public Administration, Local Government and Media; Agriculture, Rural Development, Economic Activities and Services; and Defense and Public Order. There is also one house management committee called the Parliamentary Ethics Committee. There is also the Standing Commission which remains active even while the rest of the assembly is not in session.

== Judicial branch ==
The judiciary consists of the Supreme Court, Constitutional Council, Administrative Tribunal, the Superior Council of the Judiciary and provincial, district, and municipal courts.

=== Supreme Court ===
The Supreme Court is the highest court in Mozambique on criminal and civil matters along with matters not assigned to other courts like the Administrative Trubinal and Constitutional Council. The Supreme Court's judges are elected by the legislature. The President of the Supreme Court and Vice President of the Supreme Court are appointed by the President of the Republic and ratified by the Assembly of the Republic. Supreme Court judges are nominated by the President of the Republic at the recommendation of the Superior Council of the Judiciary. There is a minimum of seven judges. Criminal cases may have their initial trial before the Supreme Court or they can be appealed by a lower court to the Supreme Court. The Supreme Court is the final court for appeals.

=== Constitutional Council ===
The Constitutional Council determines the legality of legislative action and has final say on whether or not a law is constitutional. The President may request the Constitutional Council to review a law before ratifying it. Constitutional issues can be appealed to the Constitutional Council by lower courts. A matter may be presented before the Constitutional Council at the request of the President of the Republic, the Speaker of the Assembly of the Republic, groups of at least 2000 citizens, the Ombudsman, the Prime Minister, the Attorney-General, or at the vote of at least one third of the Assembly of the Republic.

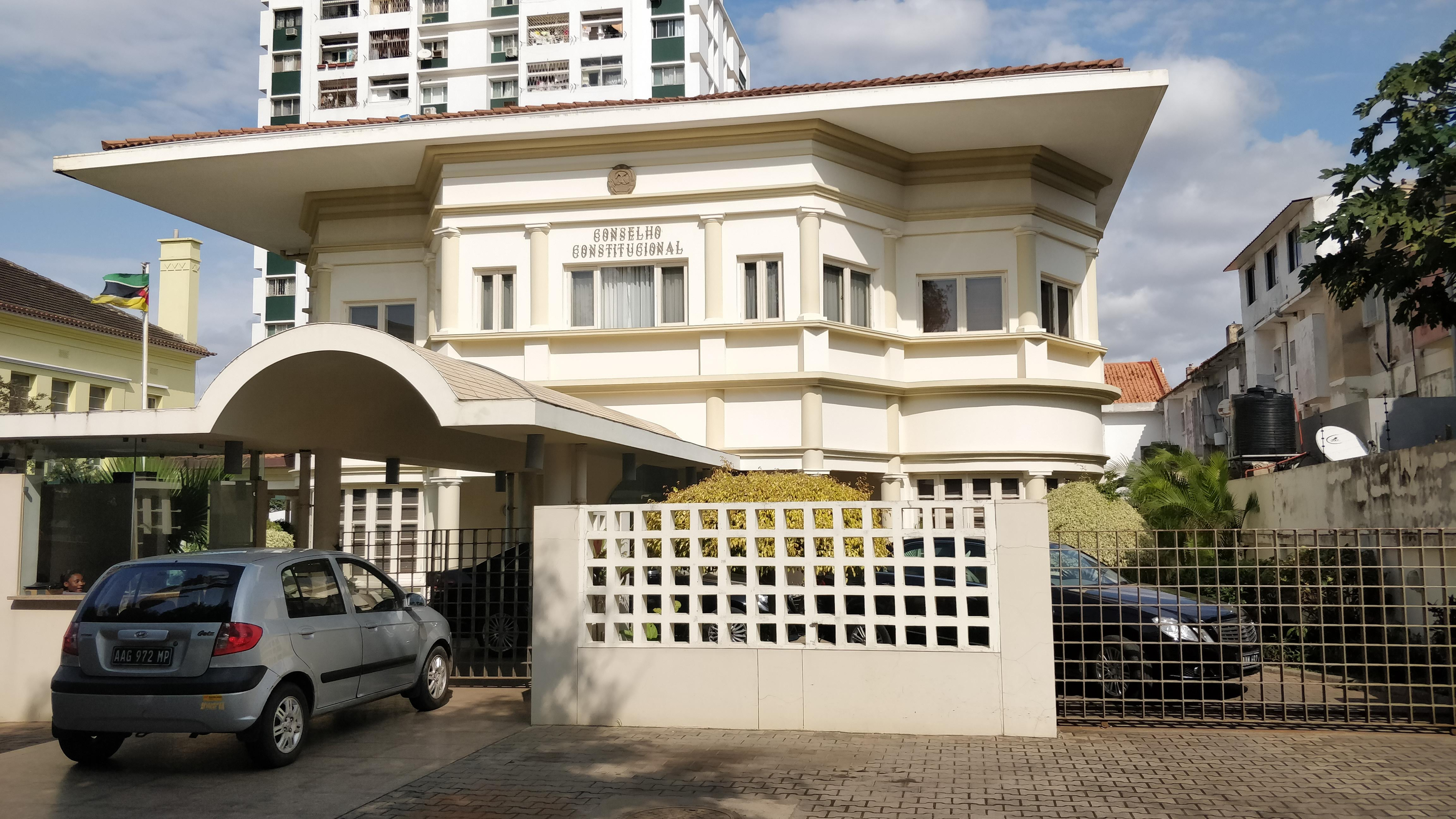
Constitutional Council building in Maputo, Mozambique's capitol

The Constitutional Council consists of seven judges. One of the judges, the President of the Constitutional Council, is appointed by the President of the Republic after consulting with the Superior Council of the Judiciary; the appointee is ratified by the Assembly of the Republic. Five more judges are appointed by the Assembly of the Republic; these judges are elected proportionally to each party's represention with the assembly. One judge is appointed by the Superior Council of the Judiciary.

The Constitutional Council's judges have a term length of 5 years and are able to serve multiple terms. In November 2023, Albano Macie, a judge counselor to the Constitutional Council, proposed a non-renewable 9 year term to help keep the court politically independent.

=== Administrative Tribunal ===
The Administrative Tribunal oversees public spending and is the highest court on deciding matters of public administration. The tribunal makes decisions regarding taxes and customs as well as appealing rulings from the Audit Office. The tribunal consists of ten judges. The judges are chosen by the Superior Council of the Judiciary; the President of the Tribunal is nominated by the President of the Republic and ratified by the Assembly of the Republic.

Different sections of the tribunal handle first hearings of a case (first instance) or rehearings (second instance) depending on the issue. Each section has three judges. The first section handles first instances about public law, the second section handles first and second instance cases about customs and taxes, and the third section has a subsection that handles visas and a subsection that handles cases about public expenses. Rulings can appealed for the case to be dealt with by the entire Administrative Tribunal for a final ruling. The entire tribunal can make the first and last ruling depending on the claimant.

=== Superior Council of the Judiciary ===
The Superior Council of the Judiciary, also called the Superior Council of the Judicial Magistracy, manages and disciplines the judicial system. According to Article 221 of Mozambique's Constitution, the Superior Council of the Judiciary has the power to appoint, transfer, promote, evaluate, exonerate, or discipline members of the judiciary. It can also propose investigations, inspections and inquiries to the court as well as evaluate and discipline officers of justice. The government, Speaker of the Assembly, or President of the Republic can seek policy feedback and suggestions from the council. The council can provide policy opinions of its own accord too.

The Superior Council of the Judiciary is presided over by the President of the Republic, the President of the Supreme Court, and the Prosecutor General of the Supreme Court. The council consists of the both President and Vice President of the Supreme Court, five members elected by the President of the Republic, seven members elected by the country's magistrates, and two appointees chosen by the President of the Republic. Each judge on the Superior Council of the Judiciary has a five-year renewable term.

== Administrative divisions ==
Mozambique is divided in 10 provinces: Cabo Delgado, Gaza, Inhambane, Manica, Maputo, Nampula, Niassa, Sofala, Tete, Zambezia. The City of Maputo (not to be confused with the province of the same name) also has its own administrative division.

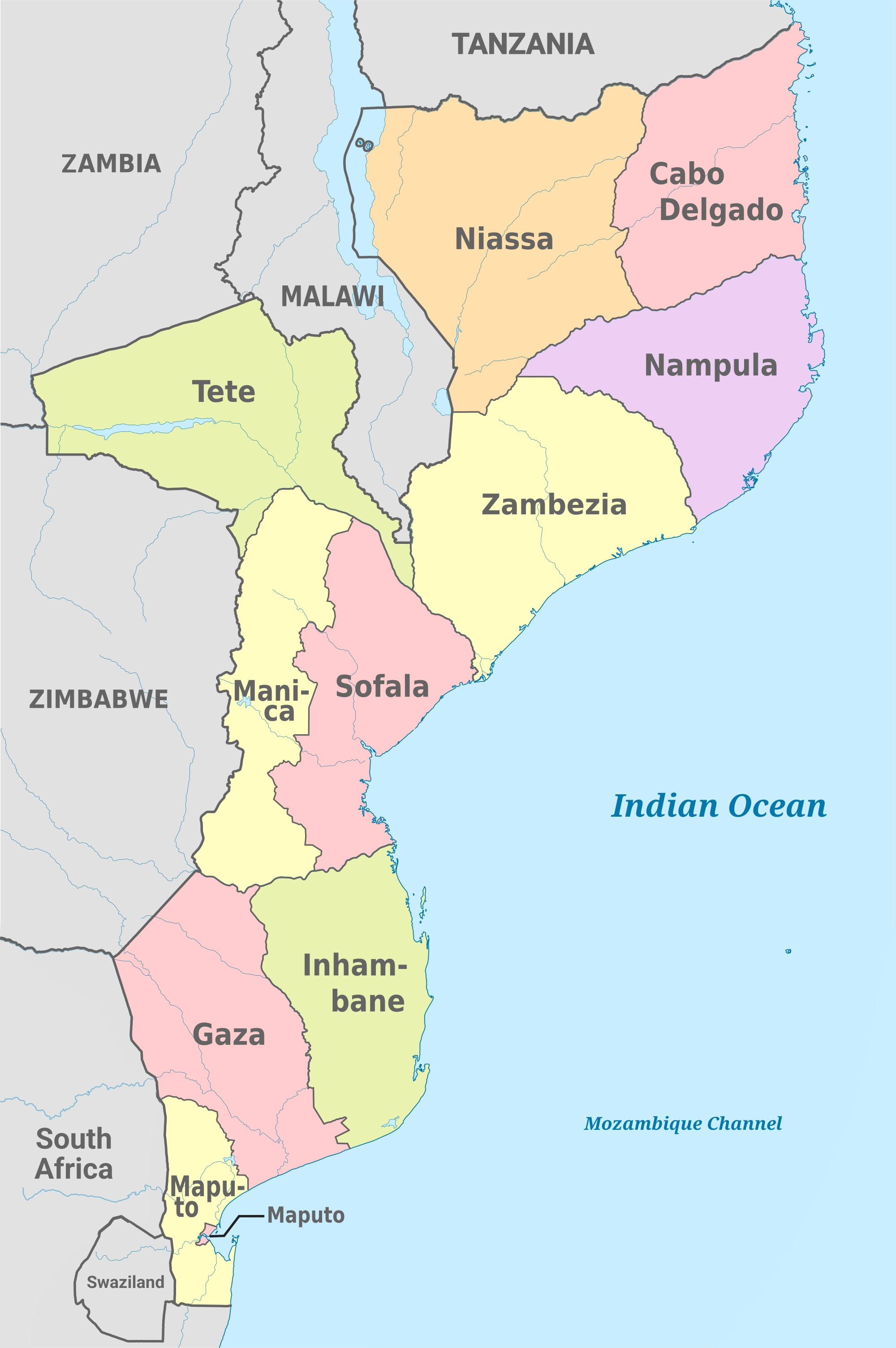
Map of administrative divisions in Mozambique

== Political parties and elections ==
=== Election security and distrust ===
In early 1994, a law passed establishing the National Election Commission headed by Brazão Mazula. The commission was politically mixed, consisting of 10 FRELIMO members, 7 RENAMO members, and 3 members from minor parties; they must unanimously agree on election results. The same year, FRELIMO and RENAMO agreed to form a second election committee called the Secretariat for Elections Administration. Regardless, suspicions around elections remain high both among the country's political parties and the populace.

FRELIMO has won all presidential, governor, national assembly, and provincial assemby elections. They have only been defeated by other parties, RENAMO and the Mozambican Democratic Movement (MDM) on a municipal level. Despite having 35 approved political parties run for national assembly seats in the 2024 election, FRELIMO, RENAMO, MDM, and ND (New Democracy) were the only parties represented in parliament from the 1999 election until the 2024 election. In the later, PODEMOS (The Optimistic Party for the Development of Mozambique) gained 47 assembly seats, becoming the largest minority party in the Assembly of the Republic. Most of the other minor parties run candidates to obtain government funding.

Since 1994, RENAMO has regularly contested election results. Voter participation has steadily declined even as every election since 1999 has been supervised by thousands of independent observers.

Fraud used to be attempted on an individual level by public servants or election officials. This began to change in the 2018 municipal elections as State institutions began manipulating elections. Institional manipulation continued into 2023 local elections as well as the 2019 and 2024 general elections. According to the Center for Public Integrity, the Electoral Administration Technical Secretariat had created 1.2 million nonexistent voters. These nonexistent voters created artificial inflated support for FRELIMO. Observers also reported seeing folded up stacks of ballots which may be evidence of ballot box stuffing.

Distrust lead to protests and violence following the 2023 and 2024 elections. In the civil unrest after the later election, 400 people died. Due to election manipulation, the Economist Democracy Index classified Mozambique as an authoritarian regime since 2019.

=== First post-war election (1994) ===
In 1993, the Technical Commission for Preparation of the Elections was formed to organize the country's first election after the war. The 1994 election faced several challenges due to the consequences of the Mozambican Civil War. Damaged roads and remaining landmines made voter registration and setting up polling locations difficult, and millions of citizens were still displaced by the time the election was being planned. Due to FRELIMO and RENAMO struggling to agree on voter education materials, civic educational efforts started ten days before voter registration opened. Traditional leaders were used to assist with education in rural areas.

1,600 Voter registration brigades traveled the country, often facing difficulties reaching and receiving food in rural areas. Remote areas had to be reached by planes and helicopters funded by donors such as the UNDP; the cost of fuel and labor for air transportation was 10.8 million U.S. dollars, 17 percent of the election budget. By the deadline, eighty percent of eligible voters were registered.

The election was monitored by 2,500 international observers, mainly from the United Nations. 15 political parties ran in the first election with the two main contenders being RENAMO and FRELIMO. There was an atmosphere of dustrust between the two parties. RENAMO threatened to boycott the election, but decided against it the night before. FRELIMO's leader Joaquim Chissano ran against RENAMO's leader Afonso Dhlakama for the presidency and won. In the national assembly elections, FRELIMO won 129 seats, RENAMO won 119 seats, and the Democratic Union won 9 seats. UNOMOZ finished supervising Mozambique's transition into peace following the election and withdrew on January 31, 1995.

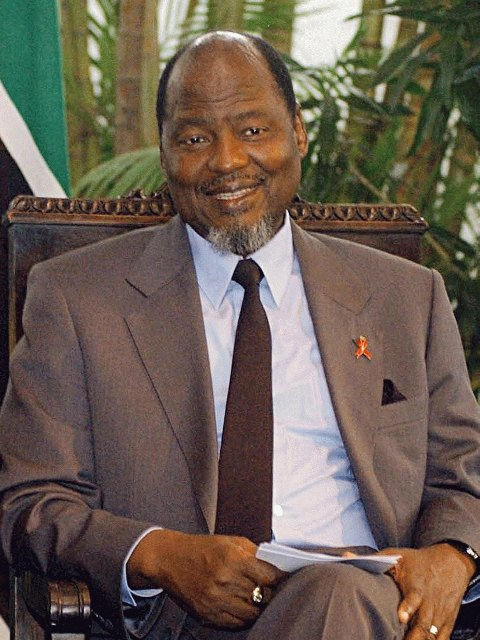
Photo of President Chissano

=== Other elections ===
==== 1999 election ====
Chissano won another term as President of the Republic in the 1999 national election, defeating RENAMO's candidate Afonso Dhlakama with a slim majority (52.29 percent). No minor parties won election seats, so the Assembly of the Republic consisted of only of members from the two major parties; FRELIMO won 133 seats and RENAMO won 117. RENAMO said there was election fraud and threatened to form its own government in the six provinces it controlled; however, US President Jimmy Carter and other international observers refuted their position.

==== 2004 election ====
The 2004 national election saw the lowest voter turnout of all of Mozambique's national elections with 36.3 percent of registered voters participating. The Carter Center, which was invited to observe the election, noticed voting adnormalities. Several districts in the provinces of Niassa, Gaza, and Tete had unusually high voter turnouts, including some having impossible turnouts (over one hundred percent.) Other issues included distrust between the Secretariat for Elections Administration and political parties as well as tally sheets not matching some polling stations. The National Election Commission was not very cooperative with the Carter Center and did not provide the rejected tally sheets for review. In a first for the country's national elections, results were verified with parallel vote tabulation (PVT). This was conducted by the Electoral Observatory, an umbrella group approved by multiple nonpartisan groups.

Chissano's successor, Armando Guebuza, represented FRELIMO in the presidential election, and Afonso Dhlakama continued to represent RENAMO. Guebuza won the presidency with 63.7 percent of the vote. FRELIMO won 160 seats in the Assembly of the Republic. RENAMO won 90 seats and no minor parties gained representation in the assembly. The National Election Commission later acknowledged that there was ballot stuffing in the province of Tete. They also admitted 1,400 vote summary sheets supporting RENAMO, equaling over 5 percent of the vote, were stolen from the Zambezia province. A FRELIMO assembly seat was transferred to RENAMO as compensation for the stolen votes.

==== 2009 election ====
Leading up to the 2009 national election, the MDM party split from RENAMO under the leadership of Daviz Simango. Simango would compete alongside Guebuza and Dhlakama for the presidency. Tensions arose between MDM and RENAMO after police connected an assassination attempt on Simango to Dhlakama's body guards. Dhlakama denied these allegations. RENAMO allegedly abducted several MDM members campaigning in central Sofala and held them in the RENAMO office for hours. Police chief Pedro Manteiga confirmed that officers were able get all MDM members peacefully released.

The National Election Commission allowed only two coalitions and 17 of the 30 applicant political parties to run for the national assembly. MDM was also only able to run for the assembly in four of their eleven electoral districts. The National Elections Commission cites registration irregularities as the reason for these limitations. All presidential candidates other than Simango, Dhlakama, and Guebuza were also disqualifued by the commission due to signature irregularities.

FRELIMO, RENAMO, and MDM had similar campaigns focusing on combating corruption, attracting foreign investment, and developing rural areas. FRELIMO's candidate Armando Guebuza won another term as President of the Republic. FRELIMO won 191 seats in the national assembly, RENAMO won 51, and MDM won 8. Both RENAMO and MDM contested the results. RENAMO alleged election fraud, but these allegations were dismissed by the Constitutional Council.

==== 2014 election ====
About a month before the 2014 election, a peace agreement was signed with Dhlakama, who had gone into hiding two years prior and started a low-level insurgency. Dhlakama and Daviz Simango were both defeated by FRELIMO's candidate Filipe Nyusi who won 57 percent of the vote. RENAMO alleged systemic fraud including police intimidation, ballot stuffing, and bias towards FRELIMO in state media. International observers found the election's voting acceptable; although the European Union had concerns about delayd in vote tabulation. FRELIMO won 144 seats in the Assembly of the Republic, RENAMO won 89 seats, and MDM won 17 seats.

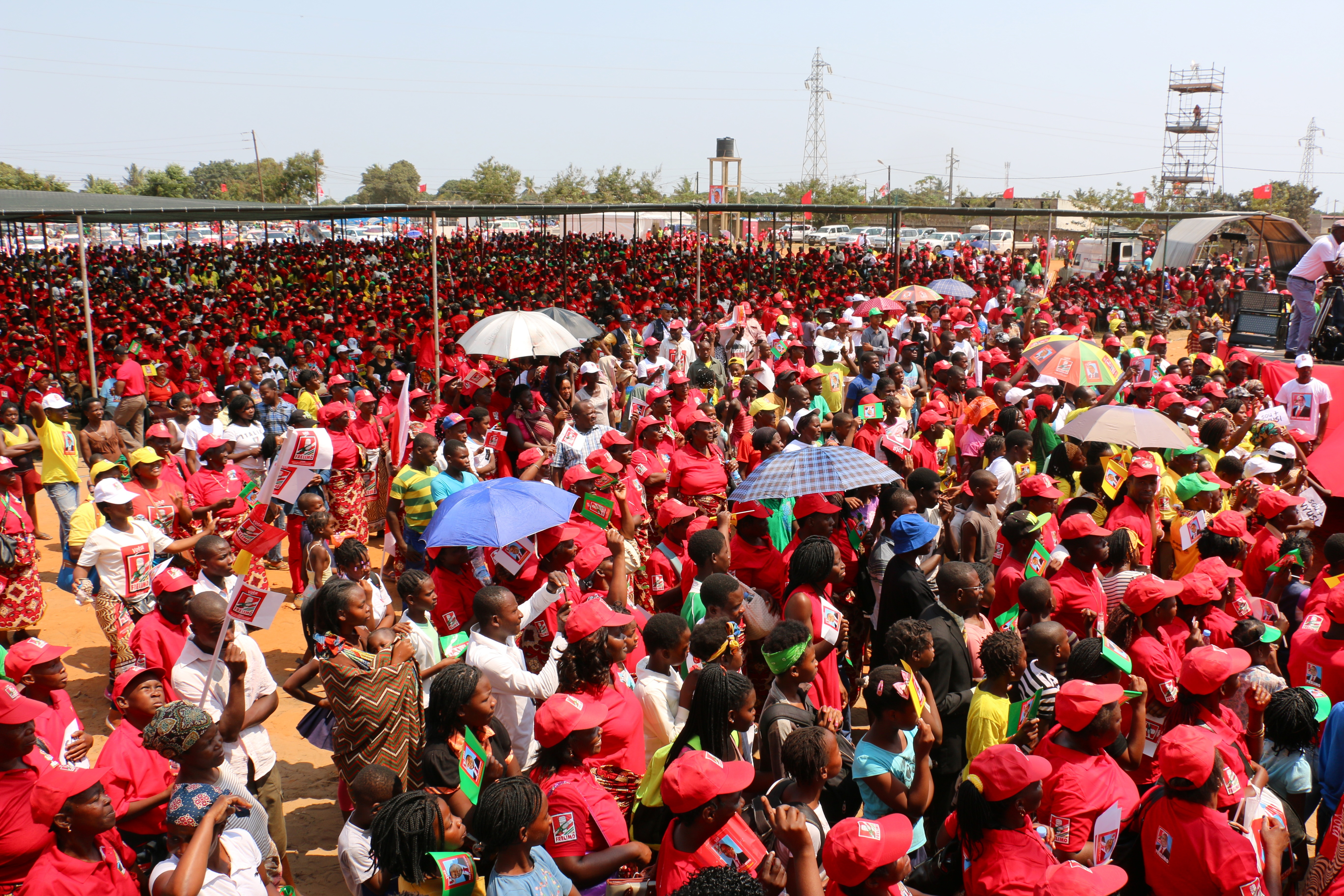
FRELIMO campaign rally in 2014

==== 2019 election ====
Leading up to the 2019 election, a nonpartisan election observer was killed by an elite police force. Systemic problems such as inconsistency applying election procedures and lack of transparent vote tabulation remained. Civil organizations and foreign observers such as the European Union were concerned over voting irregulaties including the arrest and intimidation of opposition observers, late release of campaign funds to their political parties, and vote falsification.

In October 2019, President Filipe Nyusi was re-elected after a landslide victory in general election against RENAMO candidate Ossufo Momade and MDM candidate Daviz Simango. Frelimo won 184 seats, RENAMO got 60 seats and the MDM party received the remaining six in the National Assembly. FRELIMO secured two-thirds majority in parliament which allowed FRELIMO the ability to re-adjust the constitution without needing opposition agreement.

Opposition did not accept the results because of allegations of fraud and irregularities. According to a press statement from the U.S. Department of State, "The United States notes that opposition parties, civil society groups, and election observers have made credible allegations of significant election-related fraud and intimidation. These irregularities raise concerns about Mozambique’s commitment to free and fair elections." Election results were certified by the Constitutional Council on December 23, 2019.

==== 2024 election ====
The 2024 elections continued to see opposition claims of election manipulation. The National Election Commission announced FRELIMO candidate Daniel Chapo got 70.7 percent of the votes while independent candidate Venâncio Mondlane received 20.3 percent, RENAMO candidate Ossufo Momade got 6 percent, and MDM candidate Lutre Simango got 3 percent. This was corrected after a ruling by the Constitutional Council to 65.2 percent for Chapo and 24.2 percent for Mondlane. However, Mondlane said that he should have won 53 percent of the vote based on the PODEMOS tally.

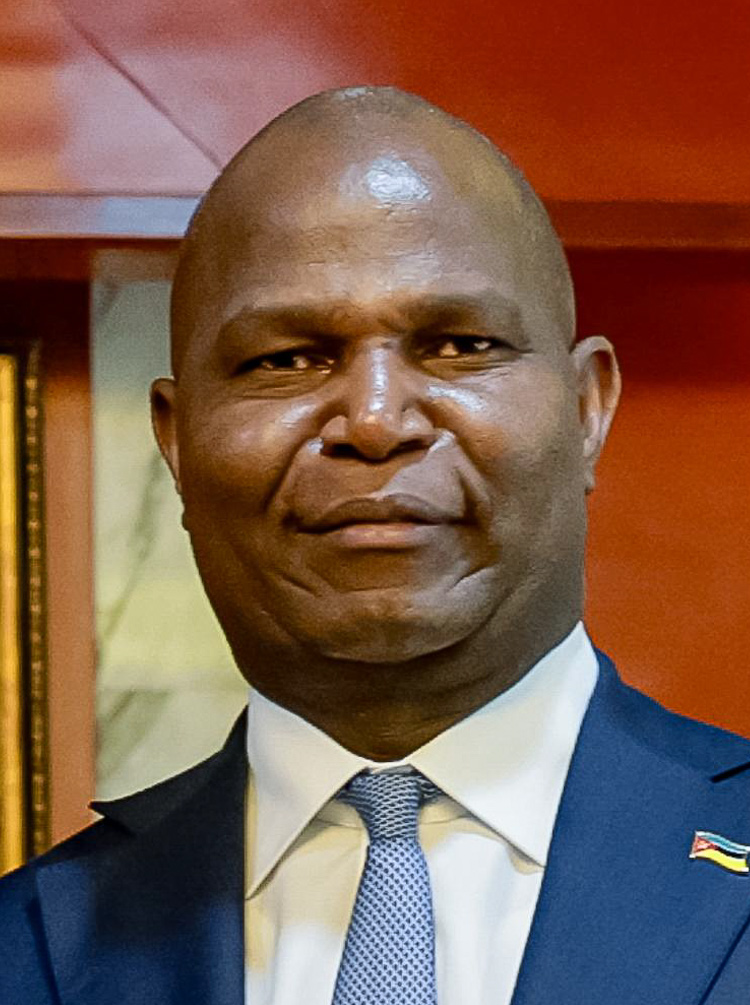
President Daniel Chapo (2025)

Mondlane and PODEMOS, the party who supported him, believe there was electoral fraud. Mondlane alleged there was election rigging voter intimidation towards PODEMOS supporters. Lutre Simango and Momade both denounced the election results. PODEMOS claims it should have won 138 seats in the Assembly of the Republic rather than 31 and MDM says it should have won 15 seats instead of 4. EU observers noted "irregularities during counting and unjustified alteration of election results at polling station and district level." A Catholic bishop's association alleged ballot stuffing.

Mondlane called for a national labor strike to be held on October 21. On October 19, Mondlane's lawyer Elvino Dias and PODEMOS spokesperson Paulo Guambe were murdered, but the original plan resumed. Police split up the peaceful demonstration, and Mondlane called for a 25-day strike in Dias' honor.

The National Election Commission announced that Chapo won the presidency on October 24, sparking further a two-day protest. On January 15, 2025, Daniel Chapo was sworn in as Mozambique's fifth president. Protests continued to in the months after his ascent to office. Though these protests have been mostly peaceful, police have used unlawful force including tear gas grenades, kinetic impact projectiles, and bullets. 400 people died in the ensuing civil unrest. In February, the alliance between PODEMOS and Mondlane broke after PODEMOS declined to boycott the national assembly. Ultimately, FRELIMO got 171 seats in the Assembly of the Republic, PODEMOS got 43 seats, RENAMO got 28 seats, and MDM got 8 seats.

== Insurgencies ==
=== RENAMO insurgency (2013-2021) ===
In 2013, RENAMO attacked a police station, announced a security zone cutting off railroads from the city of Beira to the province of Tete, and boycotted municipal elections. A peace agreement in August 2014 lead to a ceasefire.

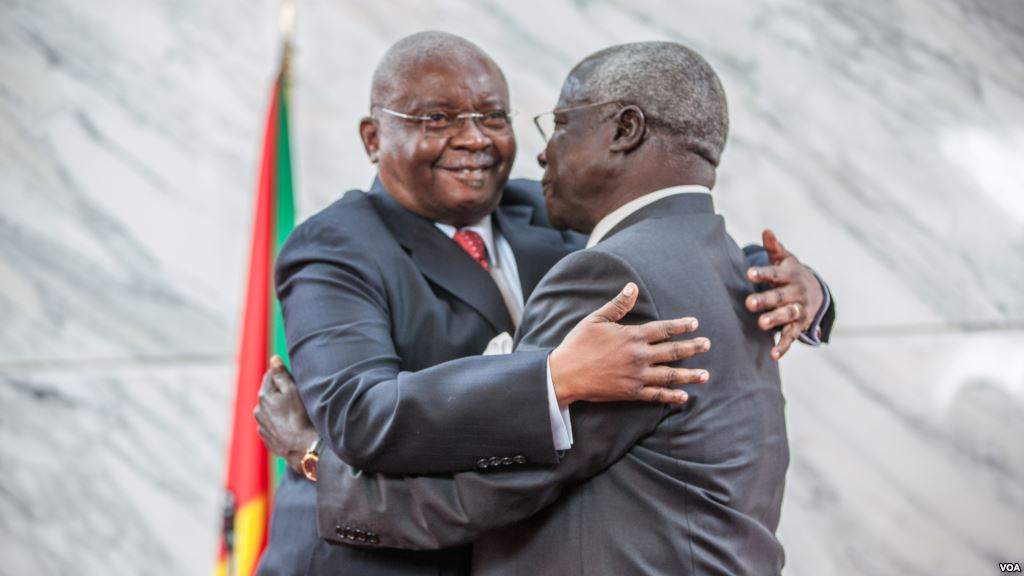
RENAMO leader Dhlakama and President Guebuza embrace after peace agreement

The following year legal expert and RENAMO supporter Gilles Cistac was killed. Dhlakama broke the conditions of the ceasefire a few months later after ordering an ambush on government forces in Moatize district of Tete. The ruling party FRELIMO called for his forces to be disarmed. In early 2016, Dhlakama swore to take over six northern and central provinces. That year, two coal trains and a health unit were attacked by RENAMO's forces. Peace talks are halted as politicians from both FRELIMO and RENAMO are killed. At the end of the year, Dhlakama declared a one week long truce, which extend into a two-month truce before becoming an indefinite truce as peace talks continued.

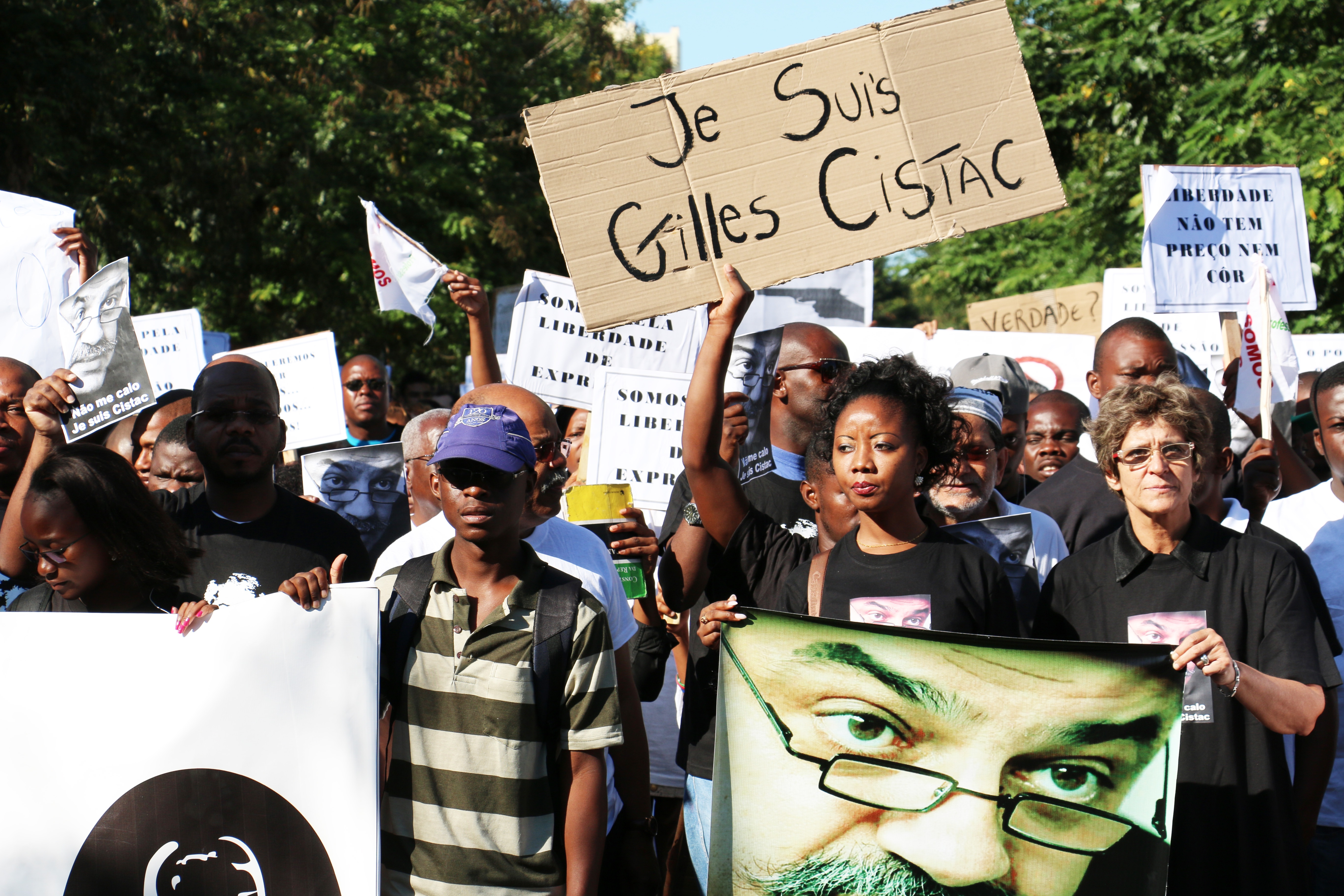
March in honor of Gilles Cistac

Dhlakama died in 2018 without a clear successor. Though he was succeeded by Ossufo Momade, a faction of RENAMO split off and formed the RENAMO military junta under the leadership of Mariano Njongo. Momade and President Nyusi signed the Maputo Accord for Peace and National Reconciliation in summer 2019. The main RENAMO party distanced itself from Njongo's forces.

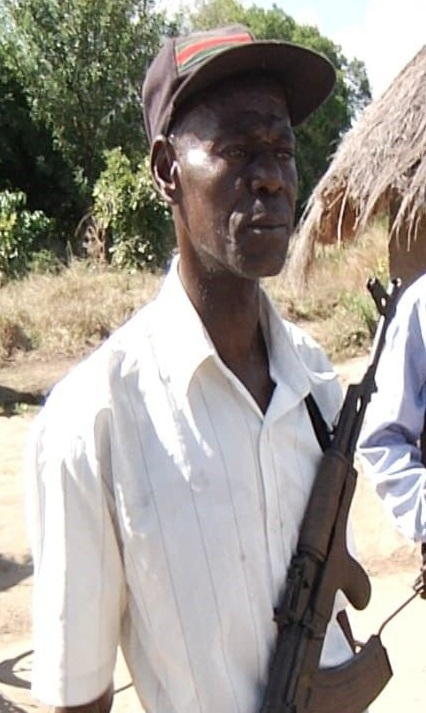
Photo of Mariano Nhongo

Per the peace agreement, the government offered to rehabilitate and reintegrate former RENAMO fighters through the Demobilization, Disarmament and Reintegration program (DDR). The United Nations aided the program by giving returnees a say in community planning and budget. Another program within DDR called Local Development for Peace Consolidation, or DELPAZ was launched in 2021 and supported by the Austrian Development Agency, the Italian Agency for Development Cooperation and the UN Capital Development Fund. It created local consultative councils which made community development proposals.

Nhongo refused to join the DDR program. In 2020, his forces were responsible for several attacks including attacking a bus, a police post, motor vehicles, and attacks on Nation Road No. 1 between Gorongosa and Nhamatanda. In October 2021, Njongo died in combat with Mozambican Defence and Security forces in the Cheringoma district of Sofala. He had no designated successor. Later that year, the last few members of the RENAMO military junta joined the DDR program. The last dissident RENAMO base was closed in June 2023 under the DDR program.

=== Al-Shabaab insurgency (2017-present) ===
A decade before the jihadist insurgency, local Muslim religious leaders noticed an unusual type of Islam springing up in Mocímboa da Praia District of the Cabo Delgado province. The group consisted of discontent young men who drank alcohol and attended mosques in shorts and shoes. They created the Ansaru-Sunna/Al-Shabaab, built mosques, and practiced a harsher form of Islam. Suggested contributing factors to the later insurgency include expulsion of ruby miners in Montepuez and the lack of promised jobs following major developments of the Cabo Delgado's gas industry. In an anonymous interview with CNN, a USAID official attributed the insurgency to "extreme poverty and marginalization, including an absolute lack of basic services like health and education."

In October 2017, jihadist insurgents began occupying the central Mocímboa da Praia District. They attacked police, stole weapons, looted, and freed prisoners. They called for Mozambicans to take up arms against moral corruption. The Al-Shabaab insurgents confronted local Islamic religious groups and trained while hiding in the bush.

In 2018, they attacked several areas in the north, especially Palma, Mocímboa da Praia and Nangade. Insurgency persisted even after Palma was shelled by helicopter. Al-Shabaab stole military weapons, raided villages for food, killed local authorities, and displaced residents. The group became linked with ISIS in 2019 after a social media video showed insurgents swearing their alliance to Abu Bakr al-Baghdadi; Al-Shabaab fell under the leadership of Islamic State Central Africa Province. In late 2019, IS Somalia began providing support through military training and providing funds the following year.

Violence greatly increased in 2020. Attacks moved from remote to urban villages. That year, 570 violent incidents occurred including kidnapping and killing, sometimes by beheading. 670,000 people in the northern provinces of Cabo Delgado, Niassa and Nampula were displaced that year as a result of the violent environment. Insurgents took over the town of Mocimboa da Praia within the district of the same name. They threatened the Palma's liquid gas project twice. The United States and Portugal assisted Mozambique's forces by providing military training.

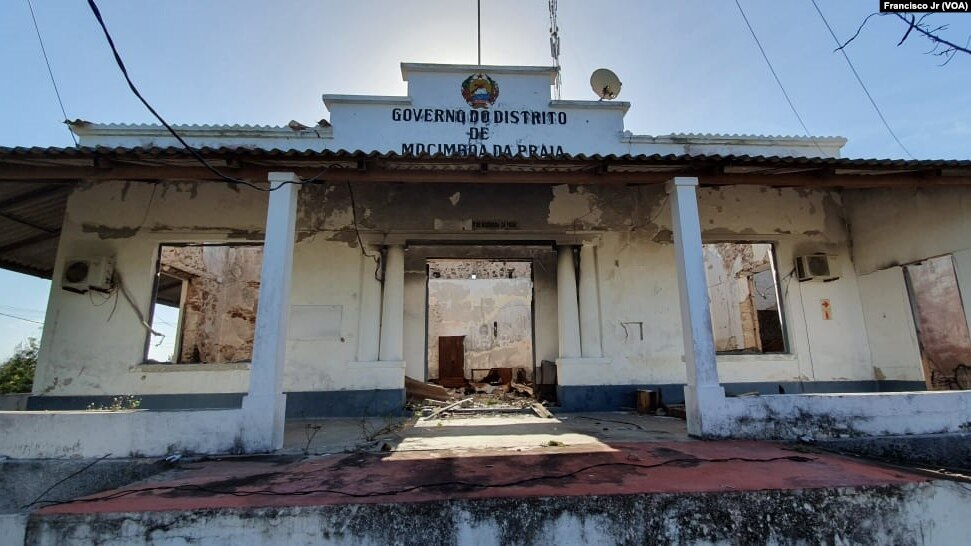
Photo of the damaged Mocímboa da Praia District Office (2020)

According to an Amnesty International report, war crimes were committed both by Al-Shabaab and defending forces. Dyck Advisory Group, a private South African militia, fought insurgents alongside government forces. The military, Dyck, and the insurgents killed hundreds of civilians according to an Amnesty International report. Some of the reported war crimes include the following: Dyck attacked crowds and fired into civilian infrastructure such as hospitals, houses and schools; Al-Shbaab burned down communities and kidnapped children for the purpose of marriage or rape of abducted girls, or to turn into soldiers for abducted boys; government forces (both police and military) enacted torture and extrajudicial executions on suspected insurgents, as well as abducted women to a nearby base where they were detained, beaten, and killed more than the men held there.

In 2021, Al-Shabaab attacked Palma, putting the natural gas project in jeopardy. Following the attack, the French company TotalEnergies had to declare force majeure, a clause that a legal agreement cannot be fulfilled due to extreme circumstances such as war. Rwanda Security Forces (RSF) deployed into Mozambique in 2021 to fight the insurgency; they gained control of the district headquarters in Palma and Mocímboa da Praia in August. The same year, SADC's Southern African Development Community Mission in Mozambique (SAMIM) deployed in the districts of Nangade, Macomia, Mueda, and Muidumbe districts to fight against the insurgents. The Mozambican military, RSF and SAMIM begain reclaiming key territory from the insurgents.

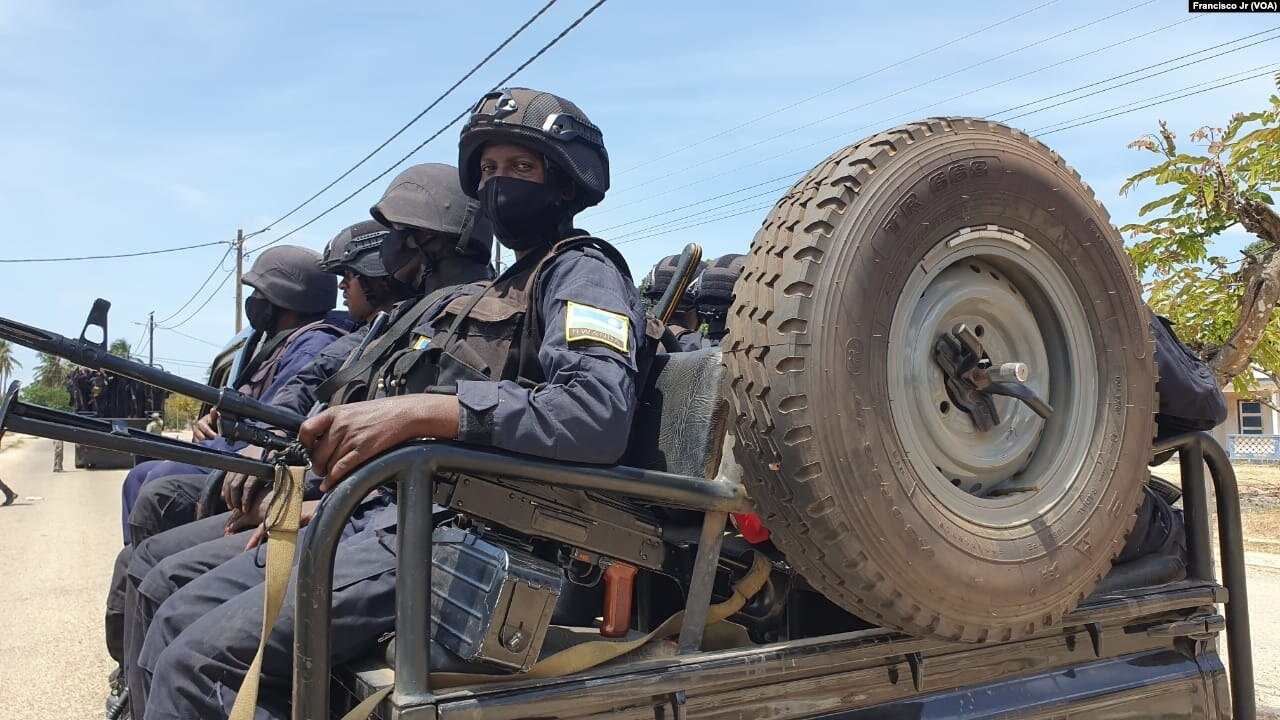
Rwanda Security Forces on patrol in Mocímboa da Praia

In May 2022, Al-Shabaab began operating under the name Islamic State Mozambique Province (ISM). Their terrorist attacks continued, but their acts of violence declined as compared to the previous year. The EU provided funding and training to Mozambique's forces. The lack of coordination between the RSF and SAMIM caused Al-Shabaab's forces to disperse throughout Cabo Delgado by the end of 2022.

ISM violence against civilians continued to decrease in 2023. As violence declined that year, 420,000 of the displaced people returned to their place of origin, although hundreds of thousands remained displaced. Some ISM attacks would continue: attacking government bases, burning homes and targeting Christians in the village of Naquitengue, and attacking a village in Mapate. In January, a video captured SAMIM throwing corpses into rubble, a violation of international humanitarian law. In August, the Mozambique's defense ministry announced that ISM's leader, Bonomade Machude Omar, had been killed. In December, SAMIM decided to withdrawal from Mozambique; the withdrawal would begin in April.

Violence greatly rose in early 2024. Jihadists in the eastern Democratic Republic of the Congo began moving into Cabo Delgado and vice versa, interconnecting their forces. Congolese jihadists also spread the practice of gaining funds through kidnapping and smuggling drugs and weapons. Displacement of citizens increased in 2024 as two cyclones along with the ongoing violence displaced hundreds of thousands of people. Humanitarian aid dropped, leading to heightened food insecurity and malnutrition. The violence lead to the destruction of religious and residential buildings as well as community buildings like schools and health centers.

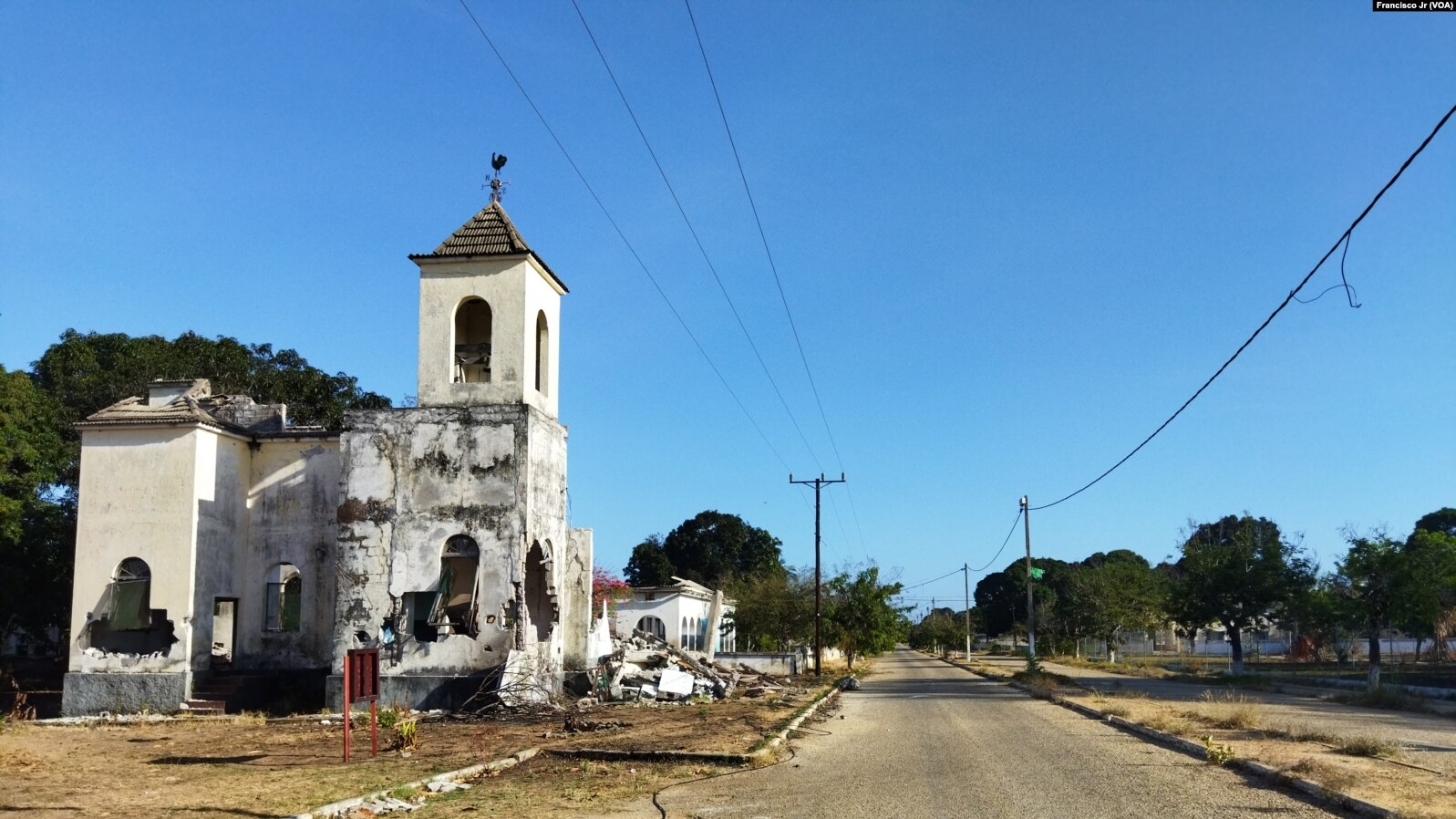
Destroyed Catholic church in Mocímboa da Praia

Violence and lack of humanitarian support continued into 2025. Rwandan forces became less effective and Mozambican forces would take charge. ISM kidnappings for the purposes of marriage or gaining child soldiers increased. Attack starting July 20 displaced tens of thousands, with Chiúre being the most heavily impacted. In September, attacks targeting Christians occurred over several weeks in Mocímboa da Praia; dozens of Christian men were beheaded by insurgents. By 2025, 2,800 civilians had died. 80 percent were killed by the ISM while 9 percent were killed by Mozambican forces. The gas project in the Cabo Delgado by TotalEnergies is hoped to resume although project contributor ExxonMobil in November 2025 is deciding on a course of action.

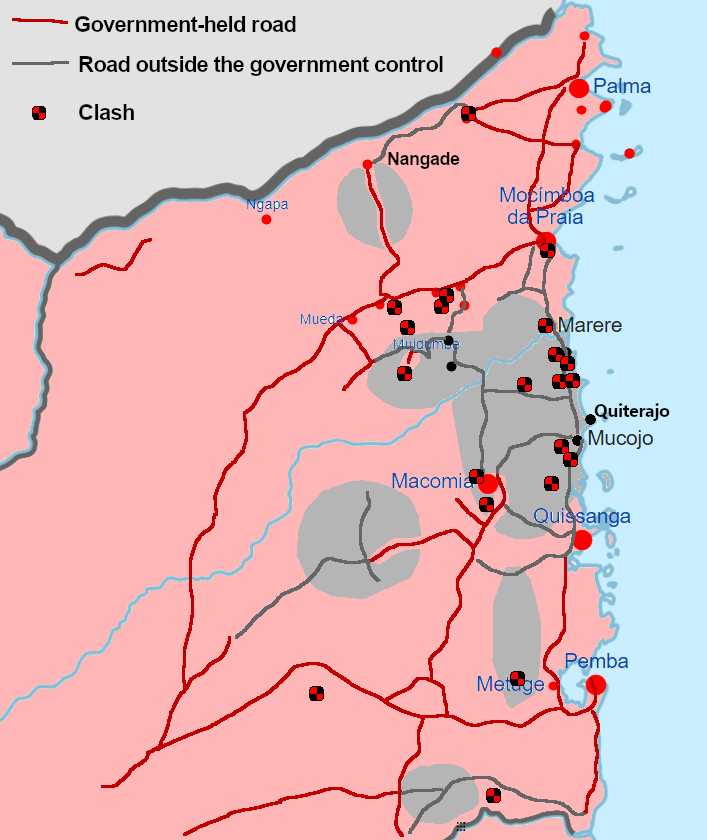
Map showing areas under government control and areas of conflict in Cabo Delgado as of September 2025

== International relations ==
=== International organizations ===
According to the CIA World Factbook and IMUNA, Mozambique participates in the following international organizations:

ACP, AfDB, AU, Commonwealth of Nations, CD, CPLP, EITI (compliant country), FAO, G-77, IAEA, IBRD, ICAO, ICC (NGOs), ICRM, IDA, IDB, IFAD, IFC, IFRCS, IHO, ILO, IMF, IMO, IMSO, Interpol, IOC, IOM, IPU, ISO (correspondent), ITSO, ITU, ITUC (NGOs), MIGA, NAM, OIC, OIF (observer), OPCW, SADC, UN, UNCDF, UNCTAD, UNDP, UNDSS, UNECA, UNEP, UNESCO, UNFPA, UNHCR, UNIDO, UNODC, UNOPS, UNV, UNWTO, Union Latina, UPU, WCO, WFP, WFTU (NGOs), WHO, WIPO, WMO, and WTO.

=== Treaties ===
In 2018, the Assembly of the Republic ratified Mozambique joining the Arms Trade Treaty, a multinational treaty to increase peace by regulating the trade of weapons. Mozambique has ratified several United Nations Human Rights treaties such as the Optional Protocol to the Convention on the Rights of the Child on the Sale of Children, Child Prostitution and Child Pornography in 2003, the Convention on the Rights of Persons with Disabilities in 2012, the International Convention on the Protection of the Rights of All Migrant Workers and Members of Their Families in 2013, and the Optional Protocol of the Convention against Torture in 2014. In August 2025, defence ministers Cristóvão Chume of Mozambique and Juvenal Marizamunda of Rwanda signed a Status of Forces Agreement (SOFA). Rwandan troops have been assisting with counter-terrorism in Cabo Delgado four years prior to the agreement; the SOFA will regulate Rwandan forces.

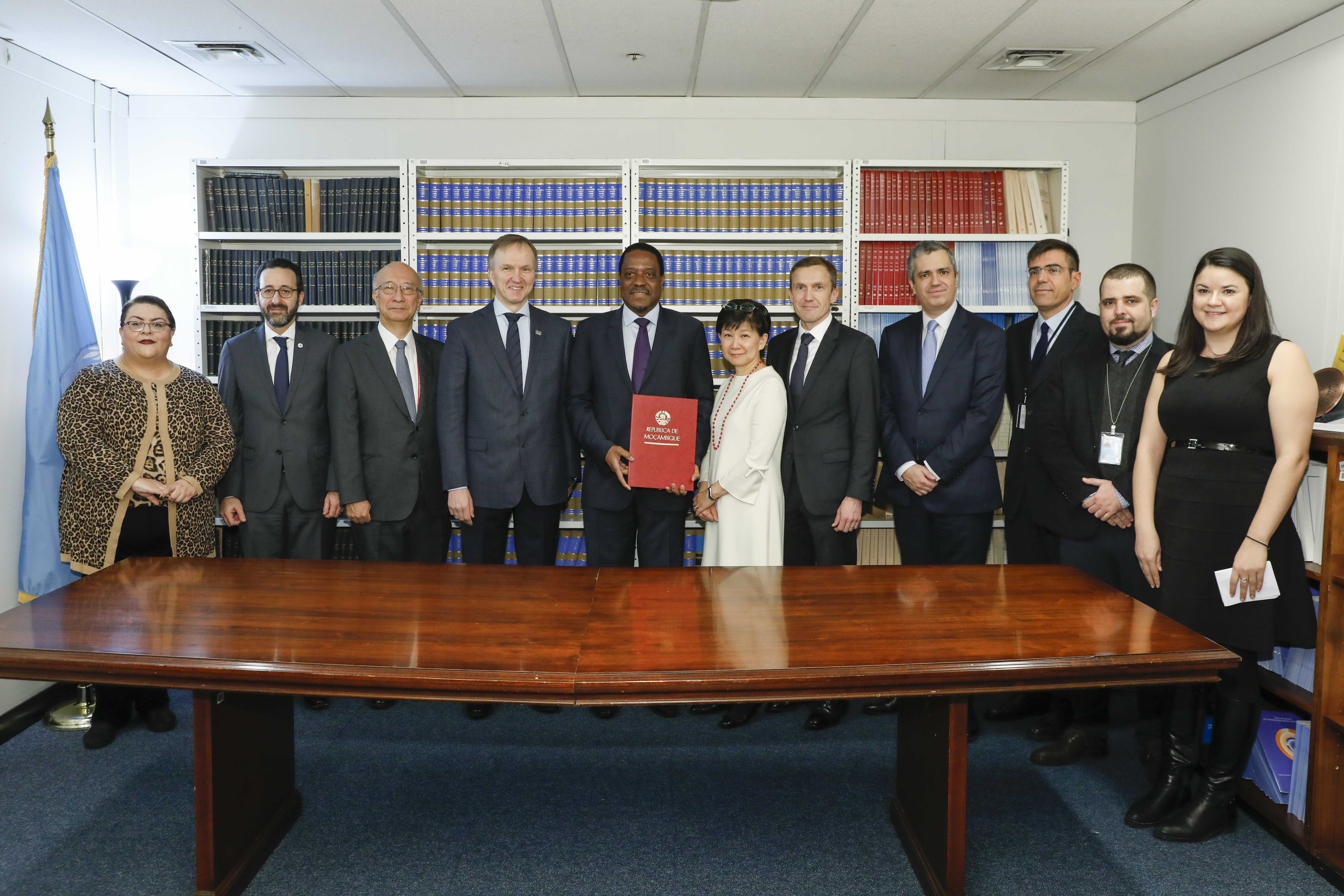
Mozambican Ambassador António Gumende (center-left) alongside other diplomats and officials celebrating Mozambique becoming the 100th country to join the Arms Trade Treaty

=== Trade agreements ===
Mozambique alongside other member countries signed the Southern African Economic Partnership Agreement in June of 2016. The Southern African Economic Partnership Agreement created by the European Union (EU) and South African Development Community (SADC). It allows Mozambique to not have to pay customs duties on its 2 billion euros worth of exports to the EU. Mozambique began applying the Southern African Economic Partnership Agreement provisionally since 2018. The country's main exports to the EU are raw cane sugar, tobacco, and aluminum.

Mozambique is also part of SADC's partially implemented free trade agreement with other countries in the agreement including Botswana, Comoros, Democratic Republic of the Congo, Eswatini, Lesotho, Madagascar, Malawi, Mauritius, Namibia, Seychelles, South Africa, Tanzania, Zambia and Zimbabwe. Mozambique has also been in a preferred trade agreement with Malawi since December 2025. It allows free trade of goods originating from the respective countries with some exceptions (sugar, tobacco, weapons, chickens, etc.)

The United States and Mozambique have had an unofficial agreement since 2018 called the U.S.-Mozambique Memorandum of Understanding. It facilitates investment and trade with several industries like energy, agriculture and tourism. Under the African Growth and Opportunity Act and the Generalized System of Preferences, many Mozambican exports to the U.S. are exempt from customs duties, including apparel and cloth.

== See also ==
- History of Mozambique
- United Nations Operation in Mozambique
