= Salvador Namburete =

Mozambican politician

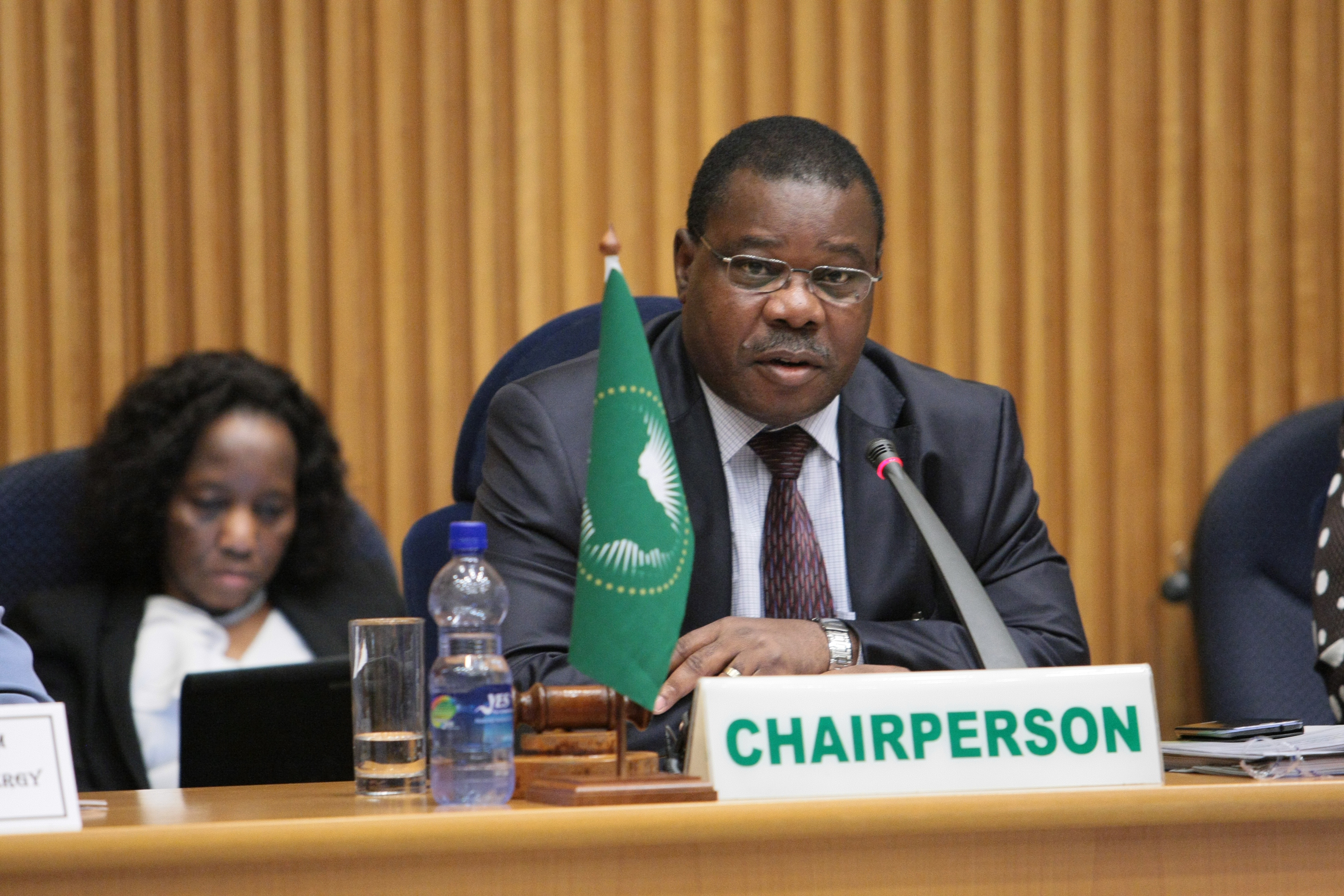

Minister of Energy of Mozambique

Personal details
- Occupation: politician

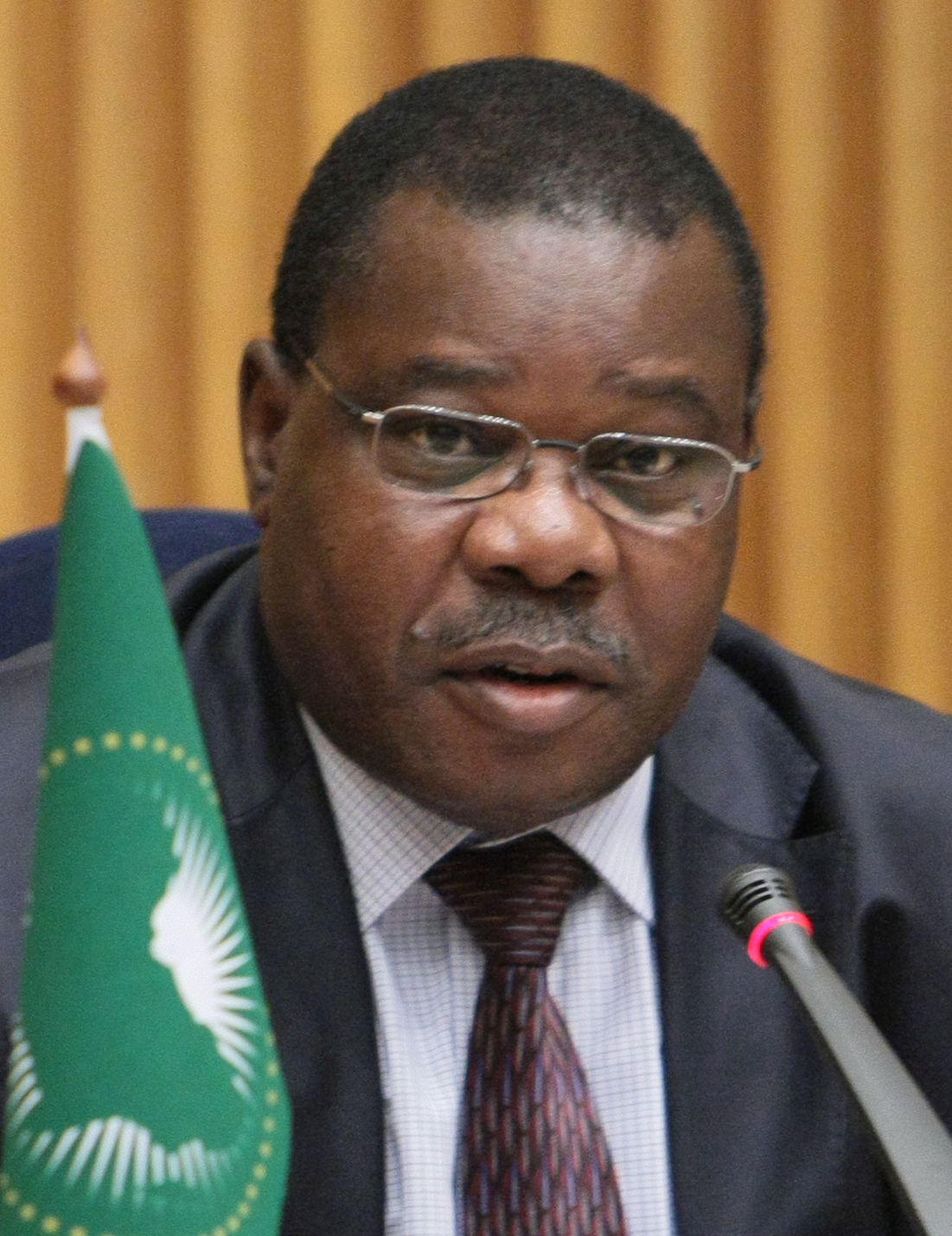
Salvador Namburete in 2012

Salvador Namburete was Minister of Energy of Mozambique. He held the office between 2005 and 2015, during the two-term presidency of Armando Guebuza.
