= Margarida Talapa =

Mozambican politician (born 1962)

President of the Assembly of the Republic
- Incumbent
- Assumed office 13 January 2025
- Preceded by: Esperança Bias

Personal details
- Born: May 6, 1962 (age 63)
- Party: FRELIMO

Margarida Adamugy Talapa (born 5 June 1962) is a Mozambican politician who has been President of the Assembly of the Republic since January 2025.

== Early life ==
Margarida Adamugy Talapa was born in Memba, Nampula Province, on 5 June 1962. She is a member of the Macua ethnic group.

== Career ==
Talapa joined FRELIMO in 1974, just after the country's war of independence ended. She joined the party's youth and women's movements in 1976. She was a member of the first Secretariat of the Mozambican Youth Organisation (OJM) in the District of Member in 1977. In August 1991, she became a member of the Frelimo Central Committee.

From 1994, Talapa worked in the provincial and central offices preparing for elections. In 1997, she was elected as a delegate for the party's seventh congress.

Talapa was elected to parliament in 2000. She was elected to the central committee of the party and then in February 2010 she was elected to the lead the party's parliamentary group. She was deputy head of the parliamentary group from 2000 to 2009. During the 2012 congress, she played a significant role in helping Armando Guebuza maintain control of the party and spoke of her admiration for him.

Talapa was the government appointed non-executive director of telecom company Mcel from 2007 to 2013, resigning after the parliament approved a law of public integrity that limited conflicts of interest.

Talapa served as Minister of Labour and Social Security from 2020 to January 2025 in the government of President Filipe Nyusi.

Talapa was elected chair of the Assembly of the Republic on 13 January 2025 after standing as the sole candidate for the ruling Frelimo Party. She is the third woman to serve as parliamentary speaker in Mozambique, succeeding Esperança Bias who was President from 2020 to 2025. In her first speech as President of the Assembly, Talapa said she was aware she was taking over at a challenging time and that she would seek to ensure the Assembly remains a worthy representative of all Mozambicans. She said, "We will work with all living forces to pacify society, with national unity and the strengthening of democracy, tolerance and a culture of peace. Regardless of whether we are from different parliamentary benches, we must look to the people."

In May 2025, Talapa spoke on a panel on "The Role of Women for Environmental Well-Being" at the 10th International Ecological Congress in St Petersburg, Russia.

== Personal life ==
Talapa is a Muslim. Her daughter, Anchia Safina Talapa Formiga was elected to the Parliamentary Assembly in 2025.
