= Oldemiro Balói =

Mozambican politician (1955–2021)

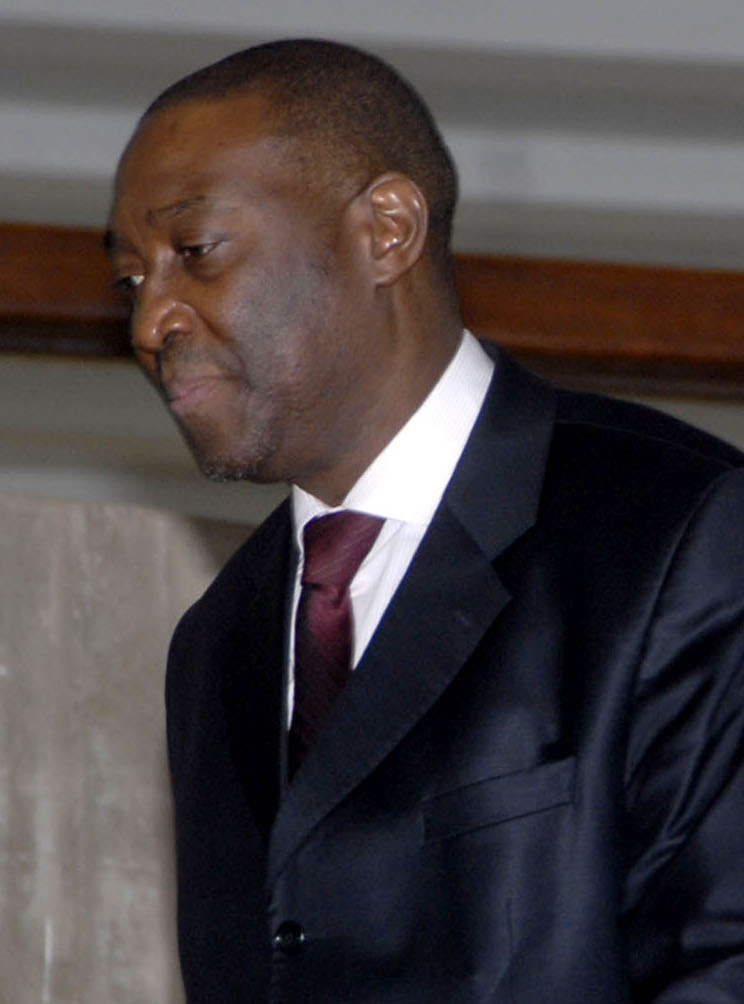
- Born: April 9, 1955
- Died: April 12, 2021 (aged 66)
- Occupation: Politician
- Known for: Served in the government of Mozambique as Minister of Foreign Affairs from 2008 to 2017

Oldemiro Júlio Marques Balói (April 9, 1955 – April 12, 2021) was a Mozambican political figure who served in the government of Mozambique as Minister of Foreign Affairs from 2008 to 2017.

== Career ==
Balói served as Deputy Minister of Cooperation in the early 1990s; in this role he was instrumental in bringing an end to Mozambique's civil war, working in partnership with the international aid agencies. He then served as Minister of Industry, Trade and Tourism from 1994 to 1999. He was subsequently active in the International Bank of Mozambique (Banco Internacional de Moçambique), serving as a member of its board of directors and its executive board. On March 10, 2008, he was appointed Minister of Foreign Affairs, replacing Alcinda Abreu.

== See also ==
- List of foreign ministers in 2017
- List of current foreign ministers
