= José Ibraimo Abudo =

Mozambican politician (born 1947)

- Born: Jose; 16 September 1947 (age 78)
- Citizenship: Mozambique
- Education: University of Lisbon
- Occupation: Politician Minister
- Known for: Minister of Justice of Mozambique
- Political party: FRELIMO

José Ibraimo Abudo (born 16 September 1947) is a Mozambican politician who served for a time as Minister of Justice, a position created in 1994 with the first multi-party elections in Mozambican history. He is a member of FRELIMO. He is a graduate of the University of Lisbon, where he received a master's degree in corporate law. He is a Muslim.

== Sources ==
- see page 36 for details
