= Mário da Graça Machungo =

Mozambican politician (1940–2020)

Mário Fernandes da Graça Machungo

1st Prime Minister of Mozambique
- In office 17 July 1986 – 16 December 1994
- President: Samora Machel; Joaquim Chissano
- Preceded by: Position established
- Succeeded by: Pascoal Mocumbi

Personal details
- Born: 1 December 1940 Maxixe, Inhambane Province, Portuguese Mozambique
- Died: 17 February 2020 (aged 79) Lisbon, Portugal

Mário Fernandes da Graça Machungo (1 December 1940 – 17 February 2020) was a Mozambican politician. He served as Minister of Industry and Commerce between 1975–1976, then as Minister of Industry and Energy from 1976–1978. He was Minister of Planning from 1982 to 1986, when he became Prime Minister of the country from 17 July 1986 to 16 December 1994. Mário Machungo served as the Chairman of the Board and President of BIM Banco Internacional de Moçambique SA.

Preceded by (–)	Prime Minister of Mozambique; 1986–1994	Succeeded by Pascoal Mocumbi
