= Maria Manuela Lucas =

Mozambican career Diplomat and Politician

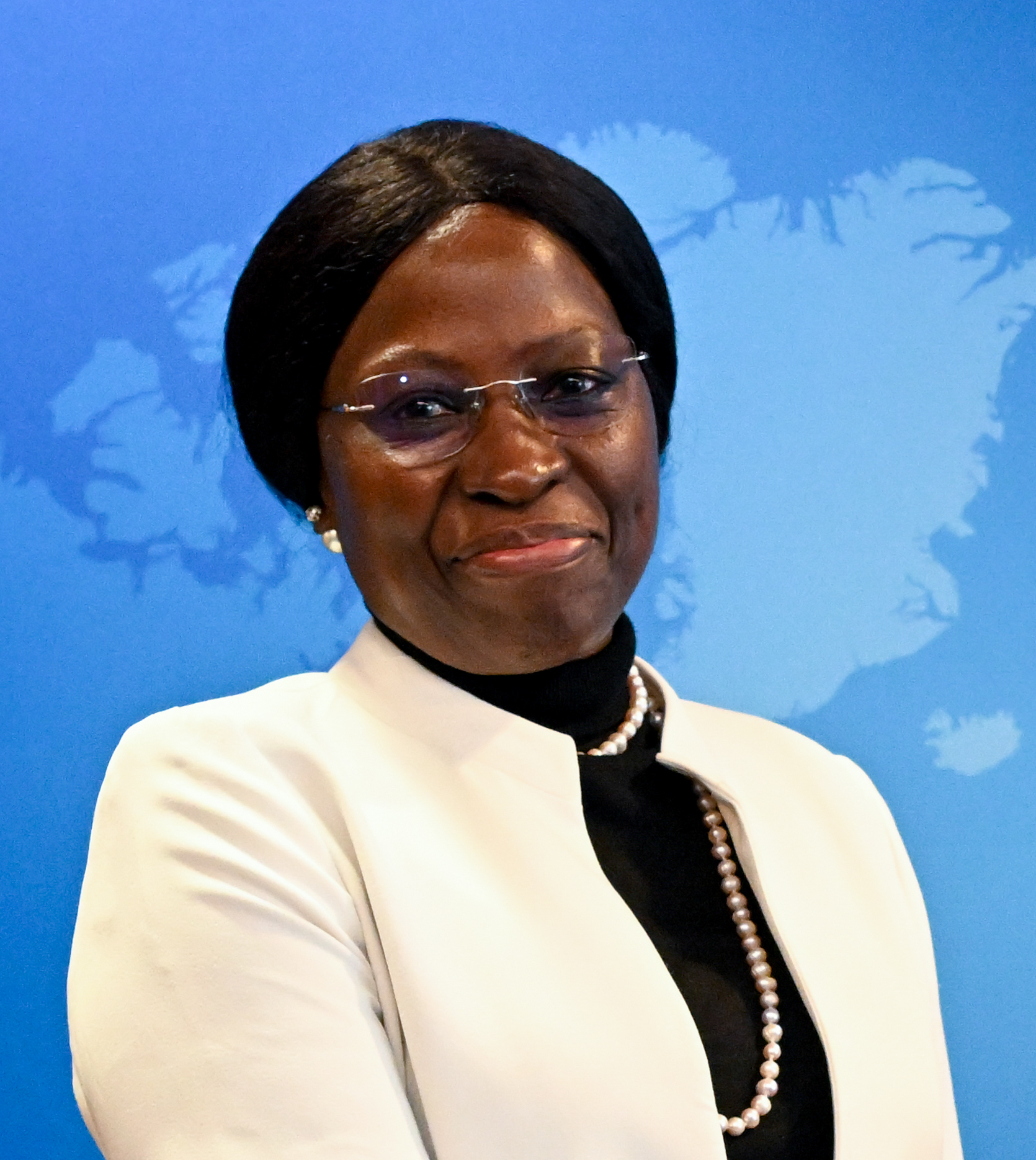
- Lucas in 2025

Minister of Foreign Affairs
- Incumbent
- Assumed office 17 January 2025
- Preceded by: Verónica Macamo

Personal details
- Education: University of Birmingham

Maria Manuela dos Santos Lucas (born November 9, 1961) is a Mozambican diplomat and politician who has served as the Minister of Foreign Affairs and Cooperation of Mozambique since January 2025. She has held several senior positions in the Mozambican diplomatic service, including Ambassador to Belgium, the Netherlands, Luxembourg, Italy, Spain, and High Commissioner to South Africa. Lucas has been a career diplomat since 1981.

== Early life and education ==
Lucas was born in Matola, Mozambique. She completed her primary and secondary education in Matola and later attended the Escola Comercial in Maputo. She earned a degree in International Relations from the Instituto de Relações Internacionais in 1985 and obtained a master's degree in International Relations from the University of Birmingham in 1993. She also received a diploma in Public Administration in South Africa in 1996.

== Diplomatic career ==
Lucas began her diplomatic career in 1981 at the Ministry of Foreign Affairs. Her early postings included service at Mozambique’s embassy in Addis Ababa and later as Consul in Cape Town. From 1997 to 1999 she served as a counsellor at the Mozambican Embassy in Brasília.

From 1999 to 2003, Lucas was Director of the Directorate for International Organizations and Conferences. In 2003, she was appointed Ambassador to Belgium, the Netherlands and Luxembourg, also serving as Mozambique’s representative to the European Union. She remained in this post until 2011.

Lucas later served as Ambassador to Italy and subsequently as Deputy Minister of Foreign Affairs and Cooperation. In 2021, she was appointed Ambassador to Spain, and in 2023 she became High Commissioner to South Africa.

== Minister of Foreign Affairs ==
Lucas previously served as Deputy Minister of Foreign Affairs and Cooperation from 2017 to 2020 during President Filipe Nyusi’s first term in office. On 17 January 2025, she was appointed Minister of Foreign Affairs and Cooperation, becoming the first career diplomat to hold the position in Mozambique. Her appointment took place at the beginning of President Daniel Chapo’s administration.

== Honours ==
Lucas received a Diploma of Honour from the President of Mozambique for her role in supporting the organization of the 2003 African Union Summit in Maputo. She was also named an Honorary Academic Member of the Diplomatic Academy of the Kingdom of Spain.

== Personal life ==
Lucas speaks Portuguese, Guitonga, Xirhonga, English and French. She has one child.
