= Alcinda Abreu =

Mozambican politician (born 1953)

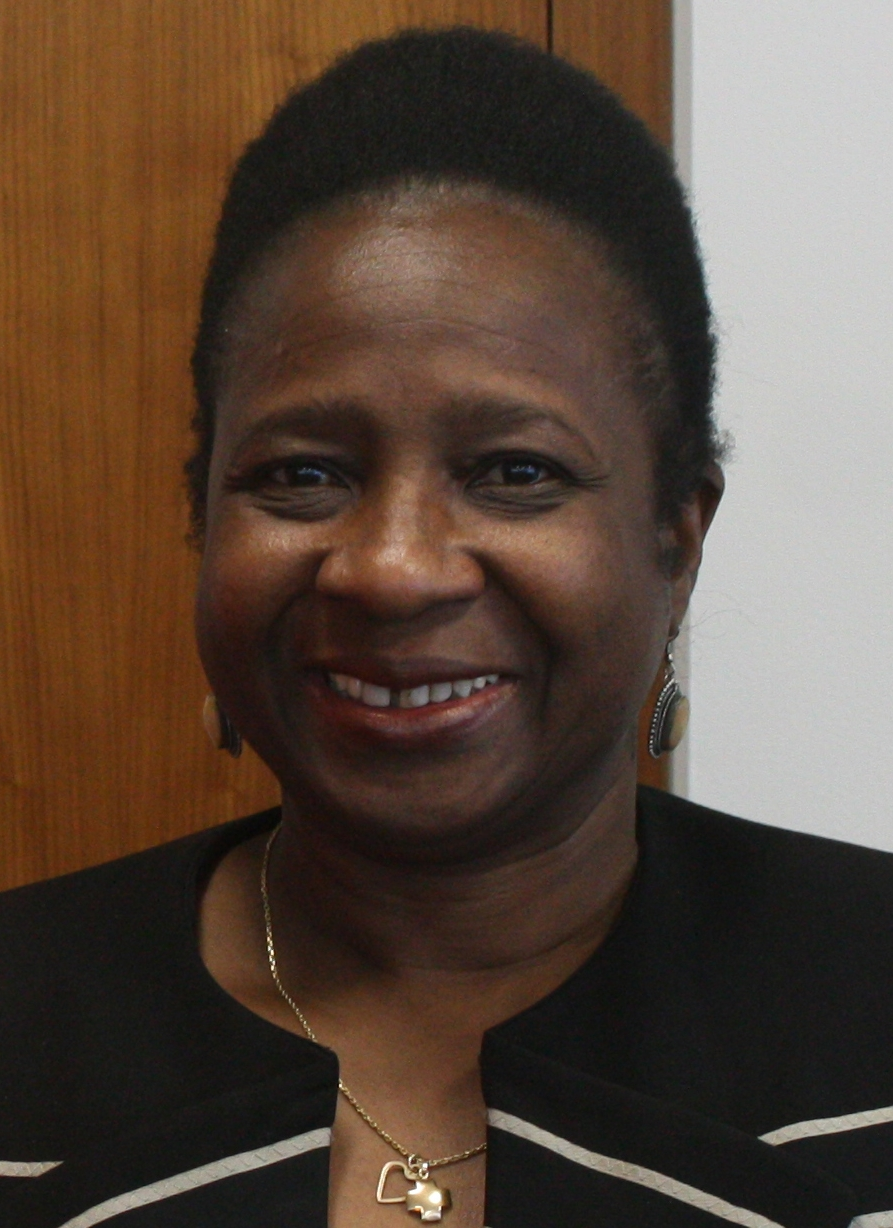
Alcinda Abreu in 2010

Alcinda António de Abreu (born 13 October 1953) is a Mozambican politician. She was Minister of Foreign Affairs of Mozambique from 2005 to 2008, having previously been the Minister of Social Welfare. She most recently served as Minister of the Environment. She has worked to increase the role of women in climate change.

== Life and career ==
Alcinda António de Abreu was born in 1953 in Mozambique. She was active in the Mozambique Youth Association and served as its Deputy Secretary-General in the late 1970s and early 1980s. Abreu was Minister of Social Welfare from 1994 to 1997. Abreu was appointed by FRELIMO as a member of the National Elections Commissions (CNEs) responsible for organizing the 1998 municipal elections and the 1999 general election. At FRELIMO's 2002 congress, she was elected to the party's 15-member Political Committee.

She was appointed as Minister of Foreign Affairs by President Armando Guebuza on February 3, 2005, when Guebuza named his new government shortly after taking office. Later that year, she visited José Manuel Barroso, President of the European Commission.

Following a cabinet reshuffle on March 10, 2008, she was reassigned to the post of Minister of the Environment; and was sworn in 17 days later on March 27. She commissioned a national strategy for the impact of climate change on women within Mozambique, the first time such a strategy had been devised anywhere in the world. She explained that societies need to adapt their plans to allow women in rural areas to become involved in climate change work, because of the impact this has on subsistence farming.
