= Joaquim Chissano =

Mozambican politician (born 1939)

His Excellency Joaquim Alberto Chissano
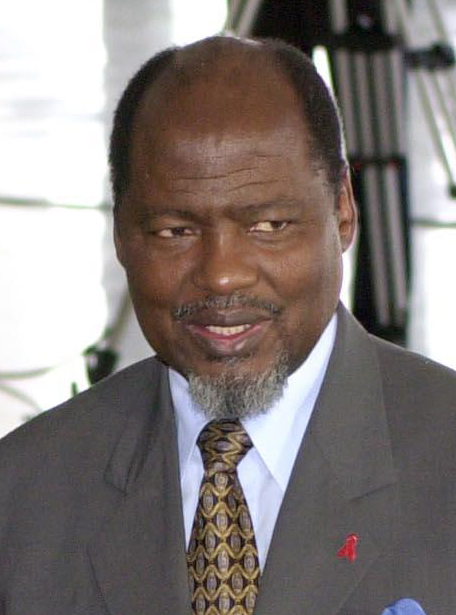
- Chissano in 2004

2nd President of Mozambique
- In office 6 November 1986 – 2 February 2005
- Prime Minister: Mário da Graça Machungo; Pascoal Mocumbi; Luísa Diogo
- Preceded by: Samora Machel
- Succeeded by: Armando Guebuza

Minister of Foreign Affairs
- In office 25 June 1975 – 19 October 1986
- Preceded by: Position established
- Succeeded by: Pascoal Mocumbi

Personal details
- Born: 22 October 1939 (age 87) Malehice, Gaza Province, Portuguese Mozambique
- Party: FRELIMO
- Spouse: Marcelina Rafael Chissano
- Children: 4

Joaquim Alberto Chissano (born 22 October 1939) is a Mozambican politician who served as the second President of Mozambique, from 1986 to 2005. He is credited with transforming the war-torn country of Mozambique into an African democracy. After his presidency, Chissano became an elder statesman, envoy and diplomat for both his home country and the United Nations. Chissano also served as Chairperson of the African Union from 2003 to 2004.

== Early life ==
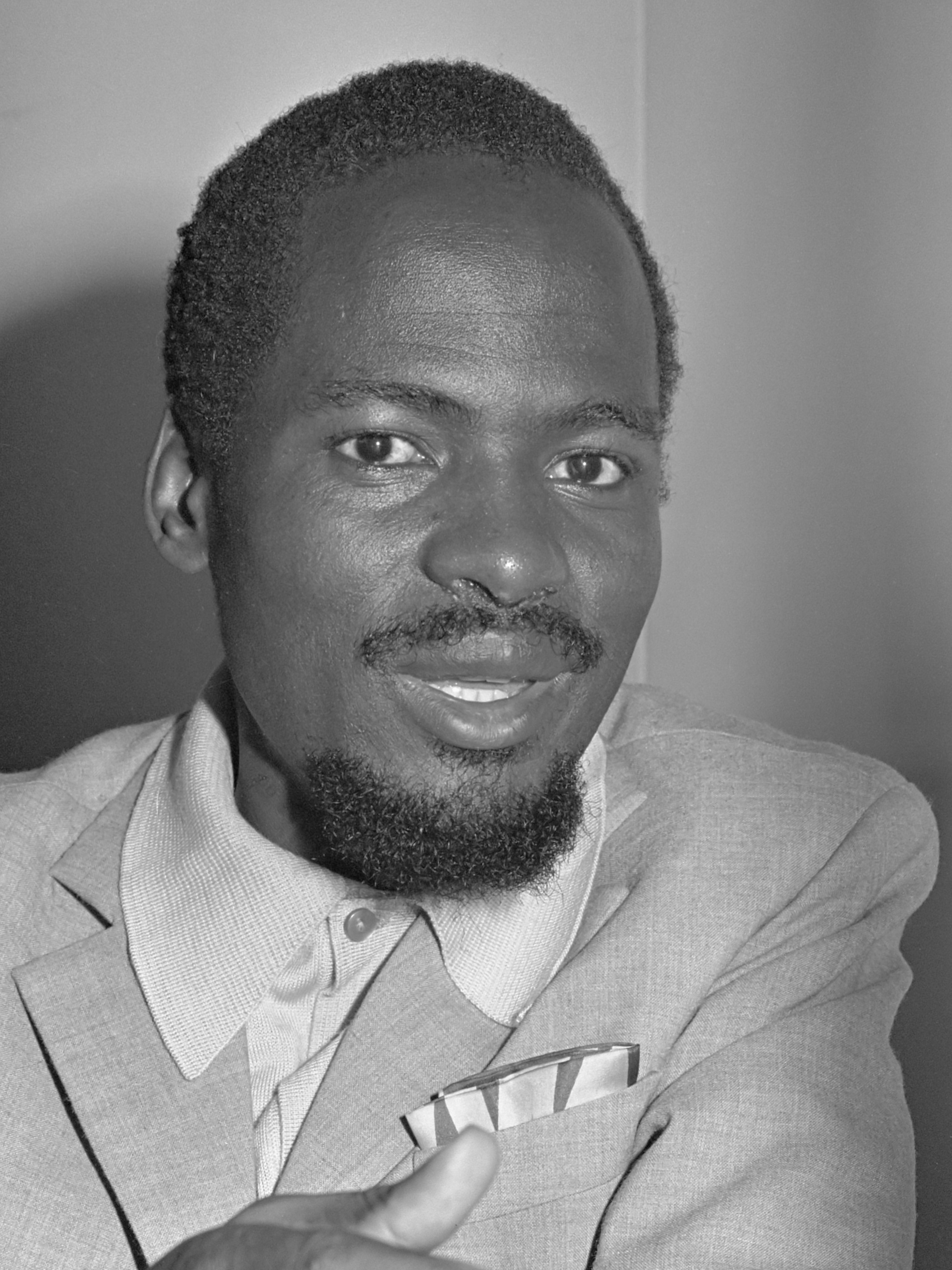
Chissano in 1972

Joaquim Chissano was born in the remote village of Malehice, Chibuto district, Gaza Province of the Portuguese colony of Mozambique (then called Portuguese East Africa). Chissano was the first black student to attend the only high school in the colony, Liceu Salazar in Lourenço Marques (present-day Maputo). After leaving secondary school, he went to Portugal to study medicine at the Faculty of Medicine of the University of Lisbon. However, his political leanings caused him problems and he moved to France where he continued his studies at the University of Poitiers. In 1962, he went to Tanzania where he participated on the political movement that resulted in the foundation of the Mozambique Liberation Front (FRELIMO) and a year later he abandoned his studies to move to Tanzania in order to serve on the fight for the independence of Mozambique.

== Career ==
Chissano became "one of the founding members" of the Mozambique Liberation Front (FRELIMO), which demanded autonomy from Portugal. Later, Chissano played a fundamental role in the negotiation of the Lusaka Accord of 1974, which paved the way for the country's independence in 1975. The new President of Mozambique, Samora Machel, appointed him as Minister of Foreign Affairs.

=== President of Mozambique ===
Chissano succeeded to the presidency and became FRELIMO party leader in 1986 when Samora Machel's presidential aircraft crashed in mountainous terrain in South Africa. Chissano ended the Mozambican Civil War in 1992 by negotiating a peace treaty with the rebel forces that "promised no prosecutions or punishments" and gave them 50% of the positions in the Mozambican army. The Renamo rebels later established their own political party.

In 1992, Chissano learned the Transcendental Meditation technique and introduced it to other government officials and their families. Two years later, Chissano and his generals ordered all police and military to "meditate twice a day for 20 minutes." In addition, 16,000 soldiers and 30,000 civilians were taught Transcendental Meditation and its advanced TM-Sidhi Program including Yogic Flying. According to Transcendental Meditation literature, Chissano said the result was "political peace and balance in nature in my country." According to Tobias Dai, the 2001 defence minister, "the effect was overwhelming" and included reduced crime, drought aversion and three times the expected level of economic growth. In 1993 Chissano received an honorary degree from Maharishi Vedic University in MERU, Holland and in 1994 negotiated an agreement with Maharishi Heaven on Earth Development for the agricultural development of 20 million hectares (49,000,000 acres) of "unused land" beginning with 2.5 million acres of timber, cotton and fruit. The 50-year contract promised 20% to 40% of the profits for the Mozambique government but other government officials refused the deal.

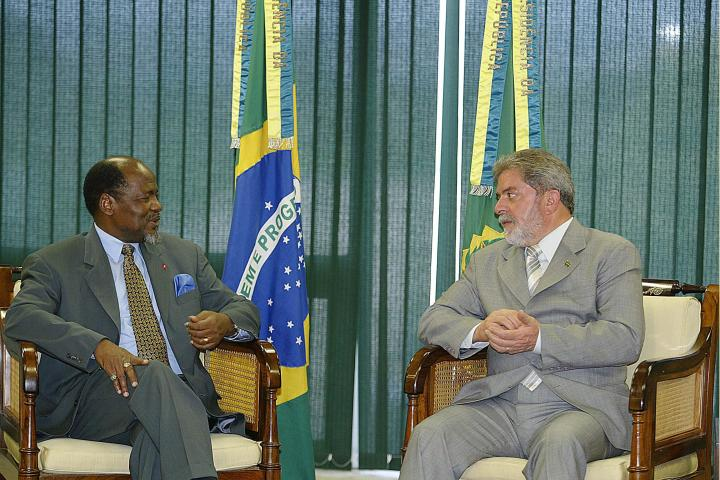
Chissano meets the President of Brazil, Lula da Silva in 2004.

Chissano was reelected to the presidency in 1994 (53.3% of votes) and again in 1999 (52.9% votes), when he defeated the former rebel leader, Afonso Dhlakama. After winning re-election Chissano's priority became poverty eradication but his efforts were complicated by a severe flood in 2000. However, Chissano had a fundamental role in convincing the G8 to write off £22 billion of Mozambique's debt in 2005. Chissano chose not to run for a third term in the elections of 2004, although the constitution would have allowed him to do so. During Chissano's presidency, almost 3 million people, about 15% of the country's citizens, were removed from "extreme poverty" and the country achieved an economic growth rate of eight percent. In addition, child mortality rates for children under age five decreased by 35% and there was a 65% increase in primary school attendance.

=== Post presidency ===
Since leaving the presidency Chissano has assumed the role of elder statesman and has campaigned for peace through his work as an envoy and peace negotiator for the United Nations. Chissano served as Chairperson of the African Union from July 2003 to July 2004. On 4 December 2006, the United Nations Secretary-General Kofi Annan appointed Chissano the Special Envoy of the Secretary-General to Northern Uganda and Southern Sudan, to resolve the conflict with the Lord's Resistance Army (LRA). On Chissano's 68th birthday in 2007, he was awarded the inaugural $5 million Prize for Achievement in African Leadership awarded by the Mo Ibrahim Foundation. Chissano was absent from the award ceremony because he was still working on his United Nations mission in southern Sudan. According to the award's judges "Mr Chissano's decision not to seek a third presidential term reinforced Mozambique's democratic maturity and demonstrated that institutions and the democratic process were more important than the person".

In 2010, Chissano wrote an article for The Huffington Post about water scarcity in Africa. Chissano is a member of the Fondation Chirac's honour committee. He is also an independent non-executive director at Harmony Gold Mining, a South African underground and surface gold mining company, as well as an Eminent Member of the Sergio Vieira de Mello Foundation.

In 2014, Chissano has spoken out in favor of LGBT rights in Africa.

On July 3, 2023, he was appointed Honorary President of the new International Association of Friends of the Algerian Revolution. This organization aims to promote the principles of the Algerian Revolution and provide support to colonized peoples.

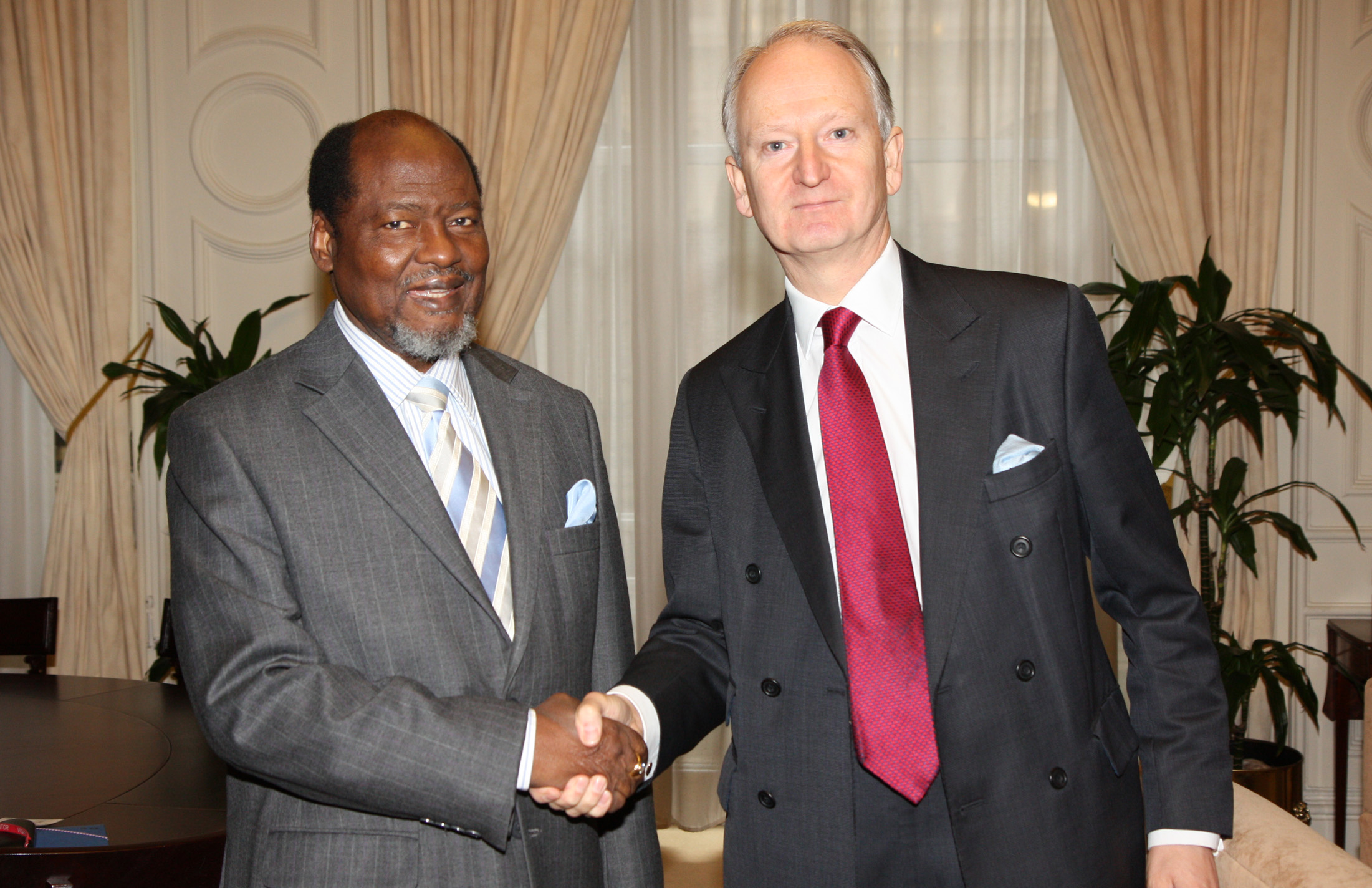
Joaquim Chissano and Henry Bellingham

== Awards and nominations ==
- On 9 December 2004, he received the Order of the Athir, one of the National Order of Merits of Algeria.
- In February 2005, he received the Honoris Causa title from the University of Minho. The title was awarded with the institution justifying the tribute with the action developed by Chissano as President of the Republic and "also for the role he played in the peace process in Mozambique, in the evolution and construction of a democratic and opening up the country to development".
- In 2006, he received the Chatham House Prize.
- In 2007, Kofi Annan announced the former President of Mozambique as the winner of the Mo Ibrahim Prize for Achievement in African Leadership by the Mo Ibrahim Foundation. President Chissano received the inaugural Ibrahim Prize for his achievements in bringing peace, reconciliation, stable democracy and economic progress to his country following the 16-year civil war which lasted until 1992. The Prize also recognises the major contribution he has made outside his country's borders.
- Chairs the Joaquim Chissano Foundation and the Forum of Former African Heads of State and Government.
- According to a UNISA statement, released in Maputo, the former head of state would be distinguished, on 24 May, with the title doctor 'honoris causa' in Literature and Philosophy, for the "political and diplomatic work developed in the last five decades." On 24 May 2011 he received it.

== Personal life ==
Chissano is married to Marcelina Rafael Chissano. He is the father of four children and his son received a scholarship to Maharishi International University in Fairfield, Iowa. Chissano has been criticized for his continued friendship with Zimbabwean President Robert Mugabe and there have been allegations that Chissano's son Nyimpine Chissano (who died in 2007) promised payment for the assassination of journalist Carlos Cardoso.

Chissano speaks fluent Portuguese, French, English, and Swahili. He speaks Changana as well.

== See also ==
- List of heads of the executive by approval rating
- Portuguese Colonial War

Political offices
Preceded by Samora Machel	President of Mozambique; 1986–2005	Succeeded by Armando Guebuza
Preceded by Thabo Mbeki	Chairperson of the African Union; 2003–2004	Succeeded by Olusegun Obasanjo
Preceded by New post	Special Envoy of the Secretary-General for LRA-affected areas 2007–present day	Succeeded by Incumbent
Awards and achievements
Preceded by New award	Prize for Achievement in African Leadership; 2007	Succeeded by Festus Mogae
Preceded by Viktor Yushchenko	Chatham House Prize; 2006	Succeeded by Moza bint Nasser
