= Nazira Abdula =

Mozambique pediatrist and politician (born 1969)

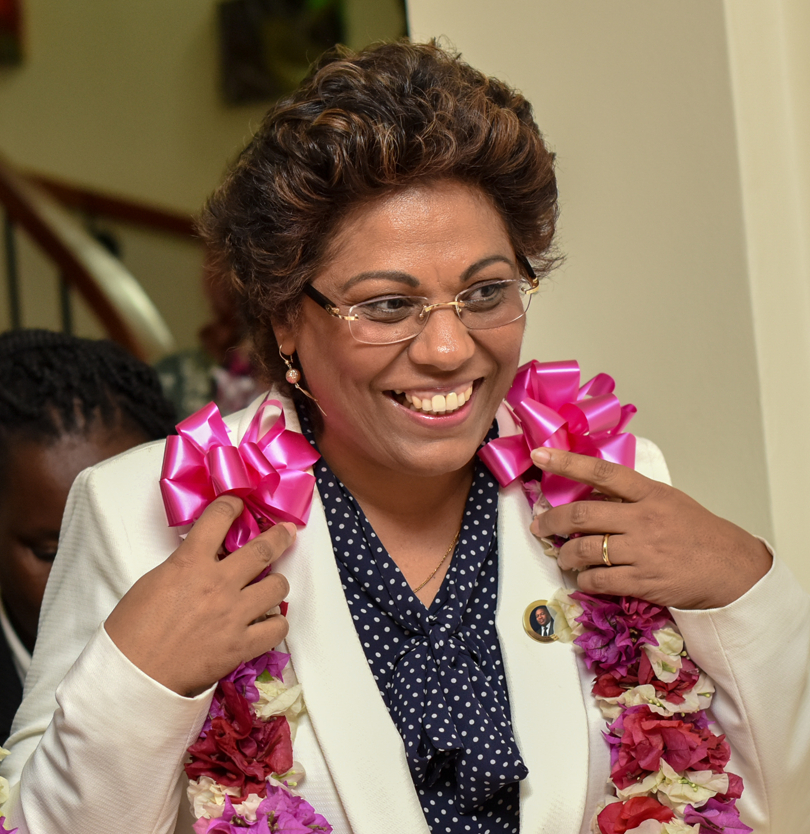
- Abdula in 2018
- Born: 1969 (age 56–57); Nampula, Portuguese Mozambique
- Education: Eduardo Mondlane University; Flinders University
- Occupation: Mozambican Minister of Health
- Years active: since 2015

Nazira Karimo Vali Abdula (born 1969) is a pediatrician and politician from Mozambique. She has served as Minister of Health in the government of Filipe Nyusi from January 19, 2015, until January 17, 2020.

== Biography ==
Abdula was born in the city of Nampula, Portuguese Mozambique in 1969. She completed her primary studies in and around Nampula before enrolling at the Eduardo Mondlane University, in Maputo, where she received her degree in medicine in 1993.

Abdula began her medical residency at Maputo Central Hospital, with later work at São João do Porto Hospital in Portugal. She received her Master's in Nutrition from Flinders University in Australia in 2006.

Abdula worked as a general practitioner at Mavalane General Hospital from 1993 to 1997, where she participated in a program fighting Malaria in the region. She also worked to combat a Cholera epidemic at Maputo Central Hospital in 1997. She later worked closely with the Catholic University of Mozambique and the Institute of Science and Health in Maputo and Beira.

=== Political life ===
Abdula was named Minister of Health on January 19, 2015, the first female minister of health in Mozambique since independence in 1975. In her role, she has worked on the fight against HIV/AIDS in Mozambique for the Nyusi government, who hopes to eliminate the disease by 2030. She has worked against the theft and sale of illicit drugs as well as the sale and trafficking of counterfeit medications. Outside of her work with the government, Abdula has written several scientific articles about antimicrobial resistance.

== Personal life ==
She is a Muslim.
