= Education in Mozambique =

Literacy (2022)
- Total: 62%
- Male: 74%
- Female: 52%

Enrollment (2002)
- Total
- Primary: 103% (gross enrollment rate); 55% (net enrollment rate)

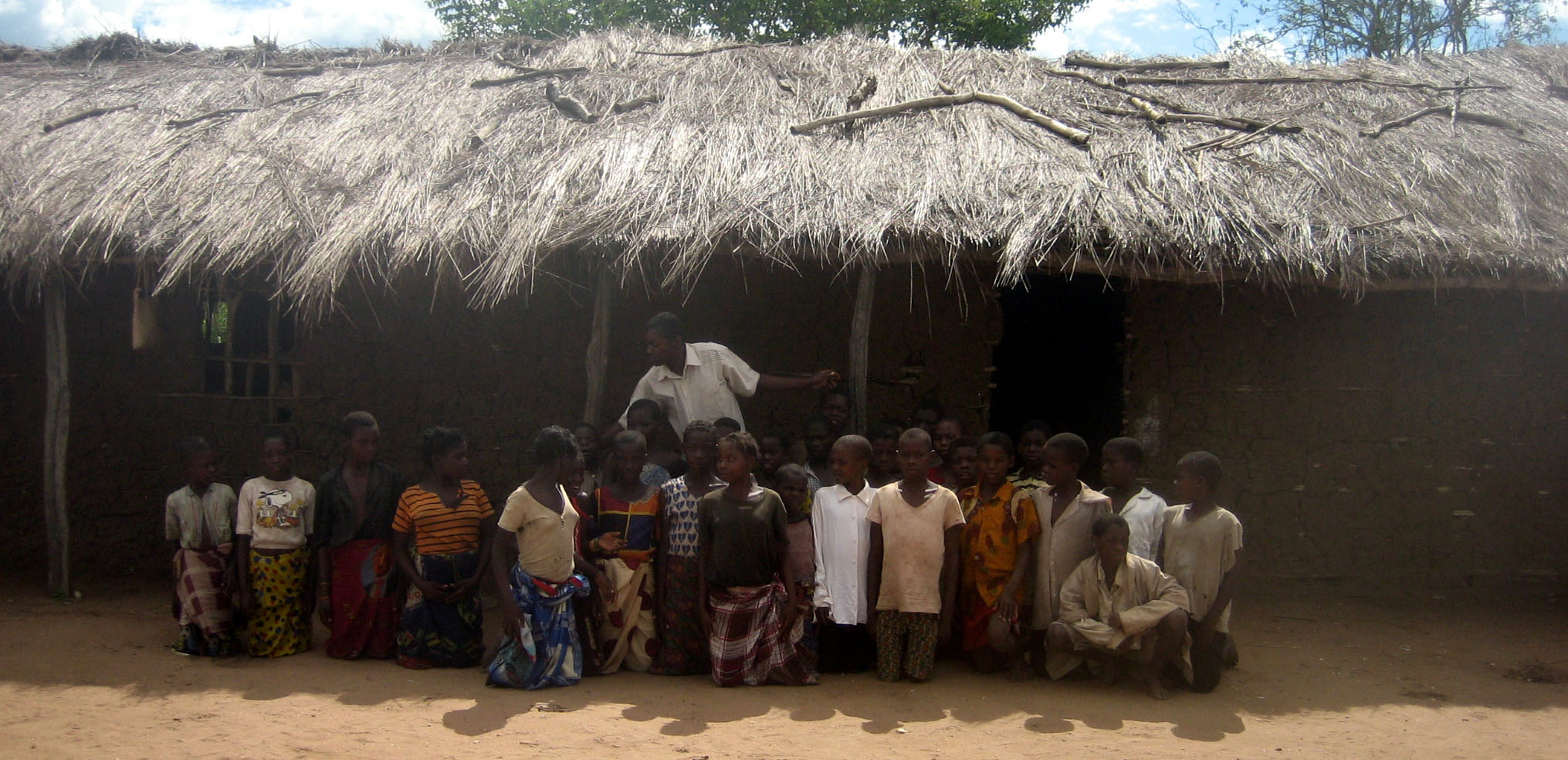
Students in front of their school in Nampula, Mozambique

Education in Mozambique is organized by three main stages: primary education, secondary education and higher education. Although having a national public education system, several educational programmes and initiatives in Mozambique are mainly funded and supported by the international community.

The Human Rights Measurement Initiative (HRMI) finds that Mozambique is fulfilling only 70.3% of what it should be fulfilling for the right to education based on the country's level of income. HRMI breaks down the right to education by looking at the rights to both primary education and secondary education. While taking into consideration Mozambique's income level, the nation is achieving 100.0% of what should be possible based on its resources (income) for primary education but only 40.5% for secondary education.

== History ==
=== Colonial period ===
Prior and during the colonial period, native African education in Portuguese East Africa was essentially informal, with initiation rites within tribes the only formal element. Formal education was however provided by Koranic schools in Muslim towns, primarily in the north. These schools focused on knowledge of the Koran and Koranic Arabic. In areas of Portuguese control or influence, schooling was also undeveloped. From the seventeenth century, Portuguese and a small number of Africans received a basic level of education (and inculcation in Portuguese cultural and religious values) at mission schools in Portuguese towns, but many of the children of Portuguese or African princes were instead sent to Goa or Portugal for their education. The small number of educated Africans meant a lack of literate workers, the shortfall being made up in part by Indians.

A growth in the educational activities of missionaries from other countries prompted the introduction of various controls in 1907: education could henceforth be conducted only in Portuguese or the native languages, while schools and textbooks were subject to government approval.

In 1927, the class of assimilados was introduced, creating a separate class of Africans who were required to possess, among others, a fluent command of written and spoken Portuguese. This class remained small, however: even by the early 1970s, the literacy rate had reached only 5%. It has been argued that the Portuguese authorities deliberately withheld education from the African population in an effort to prevent the growth of an independence movement, and that education was provided to a select few in order to isolate them from the general population.

In 1930, the education system consisted of 47 elementary schools (28 government-run, and 19 Catholic) with 11,217 students between them, roughly equally divided between Portuguese and Africans; 186 rudimentary schools, which taught basic Portuguese to just under 30,000 Africans (with another 8132 in rudimentary schools run by foreign missionaries); and one secondary school in the capital, which was educating 164 Europeans, 26 Indians, 17 of mixed race, and one African.

Such education as was provided for the African population was strongly geared towards increasing their suitability for work: the Accordo Missionário of 1940, which set out the framework for the provision of education by the church, stated that rudimentary education was for,

"the perfect training of the indigenas in national and moral ideals and the acquisition of habits and aptitudes for work... Moral ideals being understood to include the abandonment of idleness and the training of future rural workers and artisans".

The Portuguese did put expand educational provision towards the end of the colonial period: the number of schools of adaptation (successors to the rudimentary schools) rose from 1,122 in 1951 to 2563 in 1958. Education's share of the budget rose from 5.4% in 1964 to 9.5% in NATE. Even this, however, was still dominated by education for the white minority, and by 1962 still only 25% of the population had any education at all. In 1964 attendance was made compulsory for all children within five kilometres (three miles) of a school, though the lack of facilities prevented this from being fully implemented. .

=== The Frelimo era ===
Frelimo took steps to provide education even before it started the Mozambican War of Independence. A school for Mozambican exiles was founded in Dar es Salaam in the 1960s, though by 1967 it still had only 150 students. The school foundered following the assassination of Eduardo Mondlane in 1969.

As the organisation took control of areas of Mozambique in the 1970s, it promoted education among both children and adults. Literacy among women was particularly encouraged. By 1971, there were 20,000 students in the FRELIMO-controlled areas of the country, and 1.3 million children were in school by 1977. By 1978, the organisation claimed a nationwide literacy rate of 15%. However, the literacy drive suffered from a lack of trained teachers and from the practical need for many students to spend time on farmwork rather than in classrooms.

The subsequent Mozambican Civil War (1977–1992) also took its toll on educational efforts. Schools, as part of the governmental infrastructure, were a particular target of Renamo attacks and the literacy rate fell from 20% in 1983 to 14% in 1990. The situation improved after the end of the war in 1992, and in 1998 the UN estimated a literacy rate of 40%; however, the rate among women was still only half that among men. Educational enrolment also showed a strong tapering at higher levels: in 1997, 66.8% of primary age children were enrolled, 6.9% in secondary, and only 0.3% in higher education.

As of 2022, the literacy rate among those aged 15 or over was 62%. The rate was 52% for females and 74% for males.

== Primary and secondary education ==
Education is compulsory and free through the age of 12 years, but matriculation fees are charged and are a burden for many families. Families below the poverty line can obtain a certificate waiving the fee. Enforcement of compulsory education laws is inconsistent, because of the lack of resources and the scarcity of schools in the upper grades.

In 2002, the gross primary enrollment rate was 103 percent, and the net primary enrollment rate was 55 percent. Gross and net enrollment ratios are based on the number of students formally registered in primary school and therefore do not necessarily reflect actual school attendance. In 1996, 51.7% of children ages 7 to 14 years were attending school. As of 2001, 49% of children who started primary school were likely to reach grade 5. At the end of 2003 an estimated 370,000 children in Mozambique were AIDS orphans. It is estimated that HIV/AIDS could lead to a decline in teacher numbers by 2010.

In 2007, one million children still did not go to school, most of them from poor rural families, and almost half of all teachers in Mozambique were still unqualified. Girls' enrolment increased from 3 million in 2002 to 4.1 million in 2006 while the completion rate increased from 31,000 to 90,000, which testified a very poor completion rate.

== Higher education ==
=== History ===
Higher education (HE) has never reached more than a tiny fraction of Mozambicans. In 1996, the country had only 40 HE students per 100,000, compared to 638 in Zimbabwe and 5,339 in the United States. The first institution was founded in 1962 and was upgraded to university status (University of Lourenço Marquez) in 1968. It was overwhelmingly white, with only 40 African students at the time of independence in 1975. Independence initially produced a huge exodus of staff and students, student numbers at the university falling from 2433 in 1975 to 750 at the renamed Eduardo Mondlane University (UEM) in 1978. At that time there were only ten Mozambican teachers, with staff from the Communist bloc filling many of the vacancies; the university at this time has been described as, "truly a Tower of Babel". The percentage of foreign teachers at the institution has steadily declined since then, to 33% in 1991, and then 14% in 2001. During the 1980s, many Mozambican students attended higher education instead in Eastern Europe and the Soviet Union.

To increase the number of qualified teachers in the country, a Faculty of Education at the university was established in 1980, but this was superseded by the foundation of the country's second HE institution, Universidade Pedagógica (UP), in 1985. A third, the Higher Institute for International Relations (ISRI), was founded to train diplomats in 1986.

In 1996, the Catholic University of Mozambique was established. It now has campuses in Beira, Chimoio, Cuamba, Nampula, Pemba, Quelimane and Tete.

Partly due to the establishment of the private universities, student numbers rose from below 4000 in 1990 to almost 12,000 in 1999. Nevertheless, UEM and UP remain by far the largest HE institutions, with approximately 7000 and 2000 students respectively, compared to around 1000 each for UCM and ISPU.

=== Access ===
There are almost twice as many male students as female (1.8:1 in 1999); this discrepancy is more severe in the government universities, where men outnumber women 3:1. There are also substantial class inequalities in access to education. HE students are disproportionately likely to have Portuguese as their native language, and are far more likely than the general population to have educated parents. The two main universities have markedly different catchment patterns: almost 60% of UEM students are from urban areas, and a quarter from rural areas, while for UP these proportions are reversed.

Until 1990, access to HE at UEM was guaranteed for all those completing secondary school. This changed with the introduction of entrance exams the following year. Demand for places now substantially outstrips supply: in 1999, there were 10,974 applicants for 2,342 places. This over-subscription generally applies only to the government schools, with the non-governmental institutions having roughly equal numbers of applicants and places.

=== Completion rates ===
Completion rates at Mozambican HE institutions are extremely low. In the late 90s, only 6.7% of UEM students and 13.1% of UP students eventually graduated. Mario et al. have suggested that the difference between these two rates can be attributed to UEM's requirement of a final dissertation. They caution that the low proportion of students completing their studies can actually be a sign of success, as many students find work before ending their courses, and so do not feel the need to formally graduate.

=== Non-governmental institutions ===
The advent of the non-governmental universities has prompted some controversy. They have been criticised for their motivations (financial and religious, rather than purely educational), and for luring teachers away from the state sector. Many teachers work part-time at the private institutions in addition to their government jobs, so it has been argued that the private universities do at least increase the amount of education which they are providing. As noted above, the new universities have also helped to increase the number of places available and the geographical range of provision.

=== Institutions ===
Universities include:

- Universidade Eduardo Mondlane - Maputo public
- Universidade São Tomás de Moçambique private
- Universidade Católica de Moçambique - Nampula, Sofala, Cabo Delgado private
- Universidade Mussa Bin Bique private
- Instituto Superior Politécnico e Universitário - Maputo, Quelimane private
- Instituto Superior de Ciências e Tecnologia de Moçambique private
- Instituto Superior de Relações Internacionais private
- Instituto Superior de Transportes e Comunicações private
- Maputo University - Maputo public
- Universidade Técnica de Moçambique
- Academia Militar Samora Machel public
- Universidade de Lúrio- Nampula, Cabo Delgado, Niassa public
- Academia de Ciencias Policiais - Maputo private
- Universidade Zambeze - Beira public
