= Bruno Podesser =

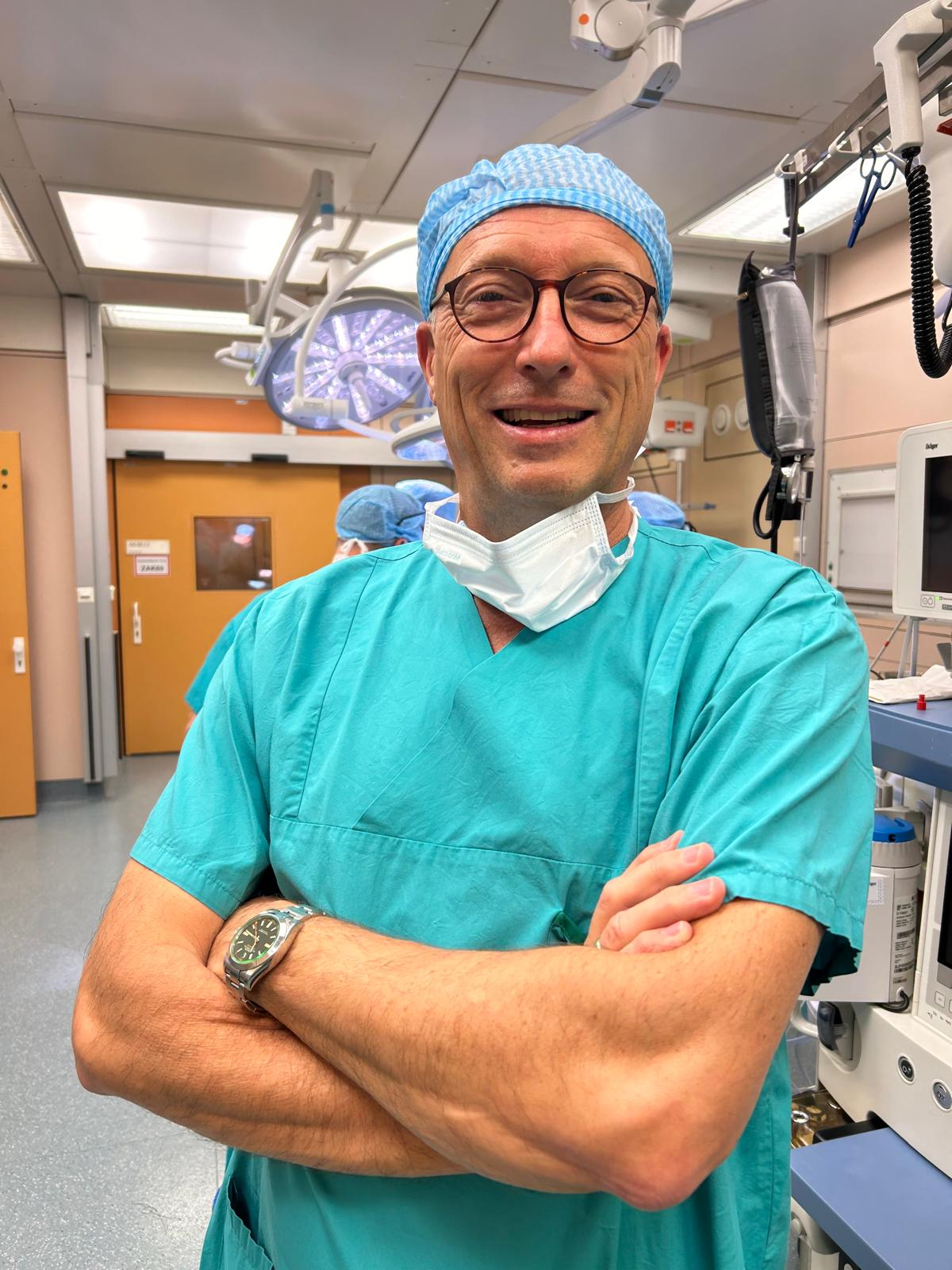
Bruno Podesser

Bruno Karl Podesser (December 21, 1964) is an Austrian professor for Laboratory Medicine and an associate professor for Surgery and Cardiosurgery at the Medical University of Vienna.

== Life ==
After obtaining his MD at the University of Vienna, he started his training as a surgeon in the 2nd Department of Surgery at Vienna General Hospital. In 1991 he got a US fellowship at Prof. William Pierce department at Penn State Milton S. Hershey Medical Center and in 1996 a Max Kade Fellowship at the Cardiac Muscle Research Lab of Prof. Carl S. Apstein at Boston University.

He is head of the Center for Biomedical Research and Translational Surgery at the Medical University Vienna.

In 2022 he was awarded an honorary doctorate from the Medical University of Vienna.

In 2024 he took over the Vice-Presidency of the Cardiac Surgery Intersociety Alliance of Prof. R. Bolman III.

== Main research areas ==
In 2011 he published together with David J. Chambers from King's College London: New Solutions for the Heart - An Update in Advanced Perioperative Protection (Springer Publishing)

One of his international collaborations involved a new technology for a heart valve - together with cardiac surgeon Peter Zilla and his team from the University of Cape Town. It is to be used specifically for rheumatic fever, which affects around 30 million people in developing countries. The first application in humans was planned for October 2020, but the coronavirus travel restrictions intervened. In order to still carry out the implantations on animals required for approval, the introduction and positioning of the valve was carried out in Vienna and monitored and controlled by the experts from Cape Town via Zoom.

== Selected patents ==
- 2010: Pharmaceutical Preparations comprising a COS releasing compound, (with G. Brunhofer-Bolzer, T. Erker, C. Studenik and G. Pomper), Patent Nr. EP09180821.2

== Other responsibilities ==
Podesser has been Secretary General of the Austrian Society for Surgical Research since 2017 and was its President from 2006 to 2007. His focus is on integrating neighbouring societies from Germany and Hungary as well as promoting young talent.

He is Vice President of the Cardiac Surgery Intersociety Alliance (CSIA), which was founded in September 2017, and took part in the 1st Partner Training Week at Maputo Central Hospital in Mozambique as a mentor in July 2024.
