= Amélia Nakhare =

Mozambican economist and politician

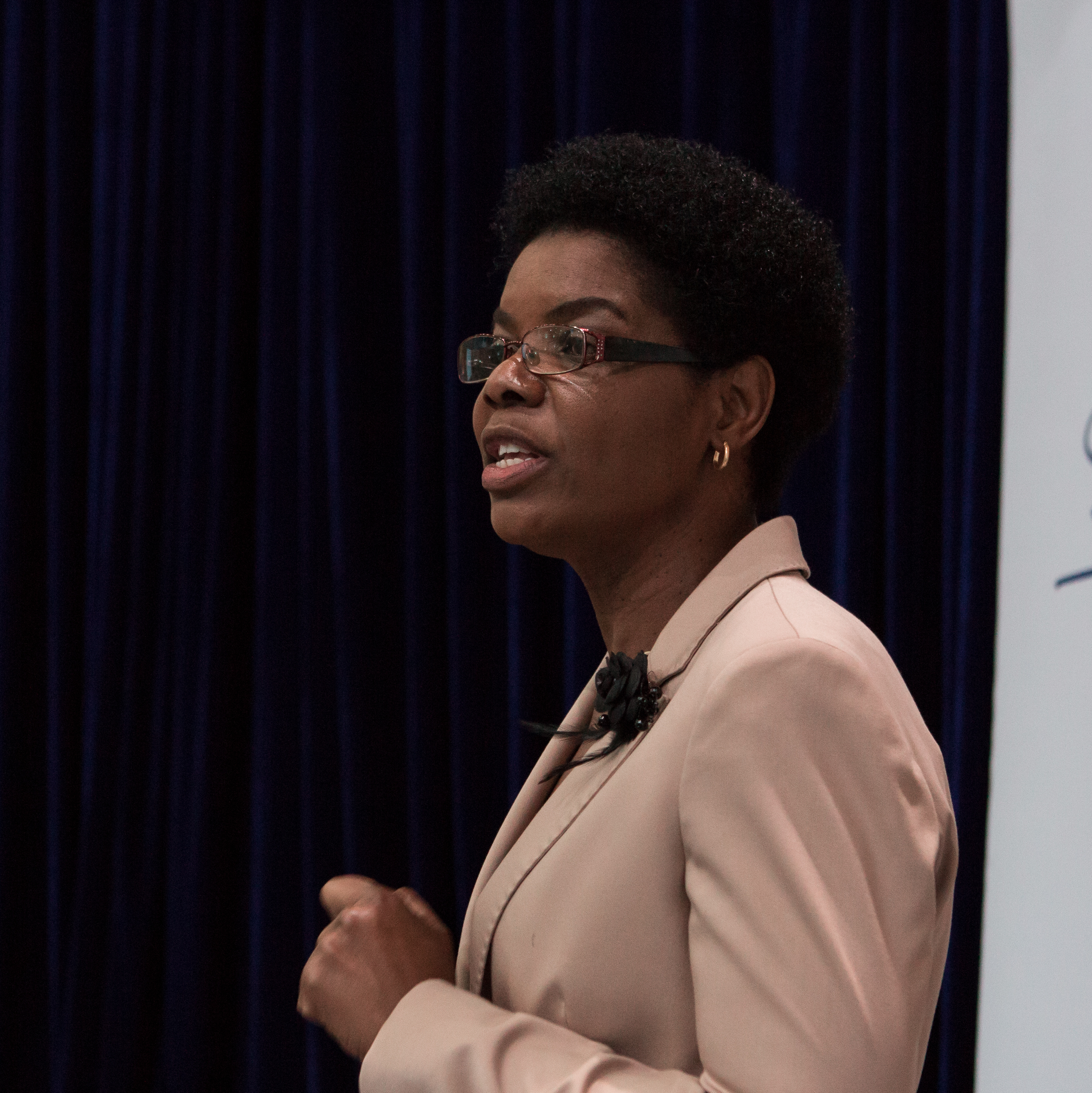
- talking about tax
- Born: 25 January, 1965; Maputo
- Other name: Amélia Tomás Taime Muendane Nakhare
- Occupations: economist and politician
- Known for: Deputy Minister under two Presidents

Amélia Tomás Taime Muendane Nakhare (born 25 January, 1965) is a Mozambican economist and politician. She was deputy minister under two presidents before leading the tax authority. In 2024 she became president of the board at Mozambique Airports.

== Life ==
Nakhare was born in 1965 in Maputo.

Nakhare trained as a teacher in 1983/84 and taught at secondary schools in Maputo. Between 1987 and 1991, Nakhare trained at the Maputo Business School. In 1992, Nakhare joined the National Statistical Office, where she became the coordinator for foreign trade statistics and, in time, director of the National Statistical Office from 2009 to 2010.

Alongside her career at the agency, Nakhare studied economics at the Universidade Eduardo Mondlane (graduating in 1997) and business management at the Catholic University of Mozambique (until 2015).

In 2011, President Armando Guebuza appointed Nakhare to the cabinet, where she took over the post of Deputy Minister in the Ministry of Planning and Development from Maria José Lucas. Together with the department head, Aiuba Cuereneia, she co-chaired the ministry until 2014. She was at the World Investment Forum in 2012.

She campaigned for Filipe Nyusi to be president, and he retained Nakhare in his cabinet after he was elected. She moved to the Ministry of Economy and Finance, where she also served as deputy head from January to August 2015. In September 2015, Nyusi appointed Nakhare head of the national tax authority (Autoridade Tributária de Moçambique), replacing Carla Alexandra Oreste do Rosário Fernandes Louveira.

In December 2015, Nakhare called on the Mozambican population to pay more taxes, as less than one percent of the population paid taxes. In her role as head of the tax authority, she halved the number of management positions in the authority and reduced salaries in 2016 due to the Mozambican economic crisis. Her successor as Deputy Minister of Economy and Finance was appointed by President Nyusi in March 2016, who named Maria Isaltina Lucas.

In 2024 she left the tax authority after nine years and took up the lead of the struggling Airports of Mozambique (Amélia Tomás Taime Muendane) as President of the board following a presidential order.
