= Eduardo Mondlane University =

University in Maputo, Mozambique

- Portuguese: Universidade Eduardo Mondlane
- Type: Public
- Established: 21 August 1962
- Affiliations: AAU
- Rector: Manuel Guilherme Júnior, PhD
- Students: 39,078 (2015)
- Undergraduates: 35,809
- Postgraduates: 3,207
- Doctoral students: 62
- Location: Maputo, Mozambique; 25.9667°S 32.5833°E
- Website: www.uem.mz

The Eduardo Mondlane University (Portuguese: Universidade Eduardo Mondlane; UEM) is the oldest and largest university in Mozambique. The UEM is a secular public university, unaffiliated with any religion, and does not discriminate on the basis of gender, race, ethnicity, or religion. The university is located in Maputo and has about 40,000 students enrolled.

== History ==
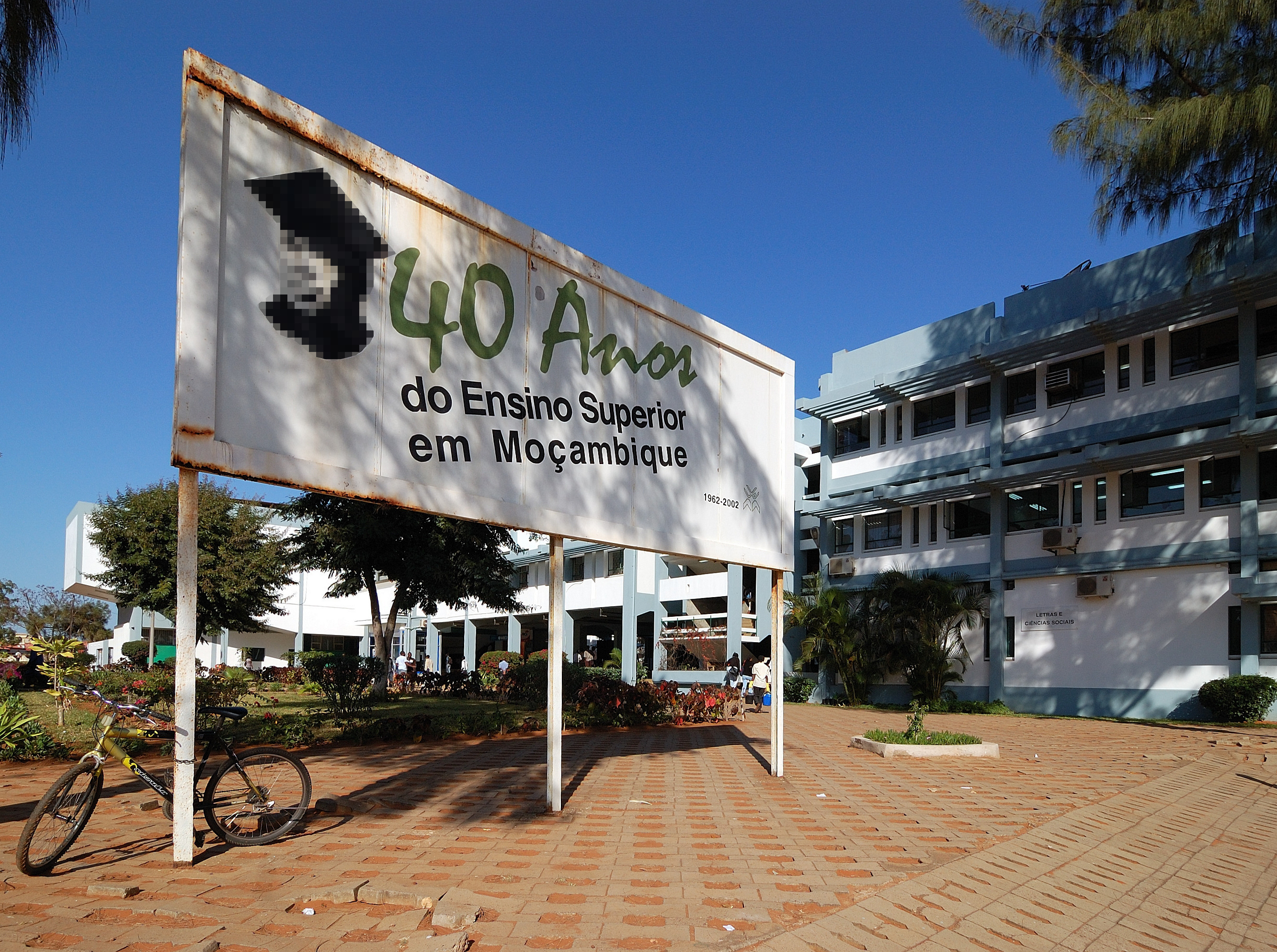
Eduardo Mondlane University

The institution was set up as a center for higher education in 1962 in what was then Lourenço Marques, the capital of Portugal's overseas province of Mozambique. Founded by the time of Overseas Minister Adriano Moreira, it was called Estudos Gerais Universitários de Moçambique (Mozambique General University Studies) after Studium Generale; in 1968 it became the Universidade de Lourenço Marques (University of Lourenço Marques). After Mozambique became independent in 1975, the city was renamed Maputo and the university was renamed in honor of FRELIMO leader Eduardo Mondlane in 1976.

== Student enrolment ==
All students at the Universidade Eduardo Mondlane are full-time, contact students. As of 2015, the university consists of around 40,000 students, of which around 3,300 are pursuing postgraduate courses

== Notable alumni ==
- Nazira Abdula, Mozambican Minister of Health
- Mari Alkatiri, first Prime Minister of Timor Leste
- U. Aswathanarayana, Honorary Director of the Mahadevan International Centre for Water Resources Management, India
- Alice Banze, trained social scientist active with Oxfam
- Mia Couto, Mozambican author, poet, journalist, and biologist
- Carla Louveira, Mozambican Finance Minister
- Venâncio Mondlane, Mozambican politician
- Odete Muximpua, Mozambican engineer
- Amélia Nakhare Mozambique Deputy Minister and tax expert
- Carmelita Namashulua (born 1962), Minister of Education and Human Development for Mozambique, previously Minister of State Administration and the Public Service of Mozambique (2015–2020)
- Adriano Nuvunga, Mozambican scholar, anti-corruption advocate and human rights defender

== See also ==
- Education in Mozambique
