= Chicuque Rural Hospital =

Coordinates: 23.8178°S 35.3480°E

Geography
- Location: Chicuque, Mozambique

Services
- Beds: 135

History
- Opened: 1913

Links
- Lists: Hospitals in Mozambique

Chicuque Rural Hospital is a hospital in Chicuque, located in the municipality of Maxixe, province of Inhambane in Mozambique. Containing 135 beds, the hospital was founded in 1913 by United Methodist Church missionary Charles John Stauffacher. It services approximately 500,000 local residents. The hospital was nationalized in 1975 at the time of Mozambique's independence from the Portuguese Empire and incorporated into the country's Ministry of Health. However, the Methodist Church was approached in 1986 to operate the hospital in partnership with the government.

== History ==
Chicuque Rural Hospital was built in 1914 on instruction of Dr. Charles Stauffacher while he was on a Methodist Mission, he had arrived in Chicuque the previous year and had started medical work. Dr Stauffacher educated midwives in the hospital, who worked in the area, instructing people on how to improve their environmental hygiene conditions, such as through digging latrines or securing clean water. Dr Stauffacher visit remote clinics twice a year to ensure they were stocked with medicine, until his death in 1974.

In 1975, the hospital was nationalised by the Mozambique government however, the United Methodist Church continued to play a role in the management and provides for gaps in the government service. The primary government hospital in the area had been across the bay in Inhambane, and during periods without a resident doctor, seriously ill patients would be sent there by sailboat. In 1995, the hospital was given funding as part of the Community Development and Health Project to improve the overall health of Mozambicans.

== Facilities ==
The Chicuque Rural Hospital is the second largest hospital in Inhambane Province with 135 beds at its main site. It serves five districts in the area. A number of other clinics in the area offer services to the community and transfer patients to Chicuque if required. Alongside its outpatient service, the hospital performs surgical procedures, inpatient care, maternity and paediatric treatments.
