= Carmelita Namashulua =

Mozambican teacher and politician (b. 1962)

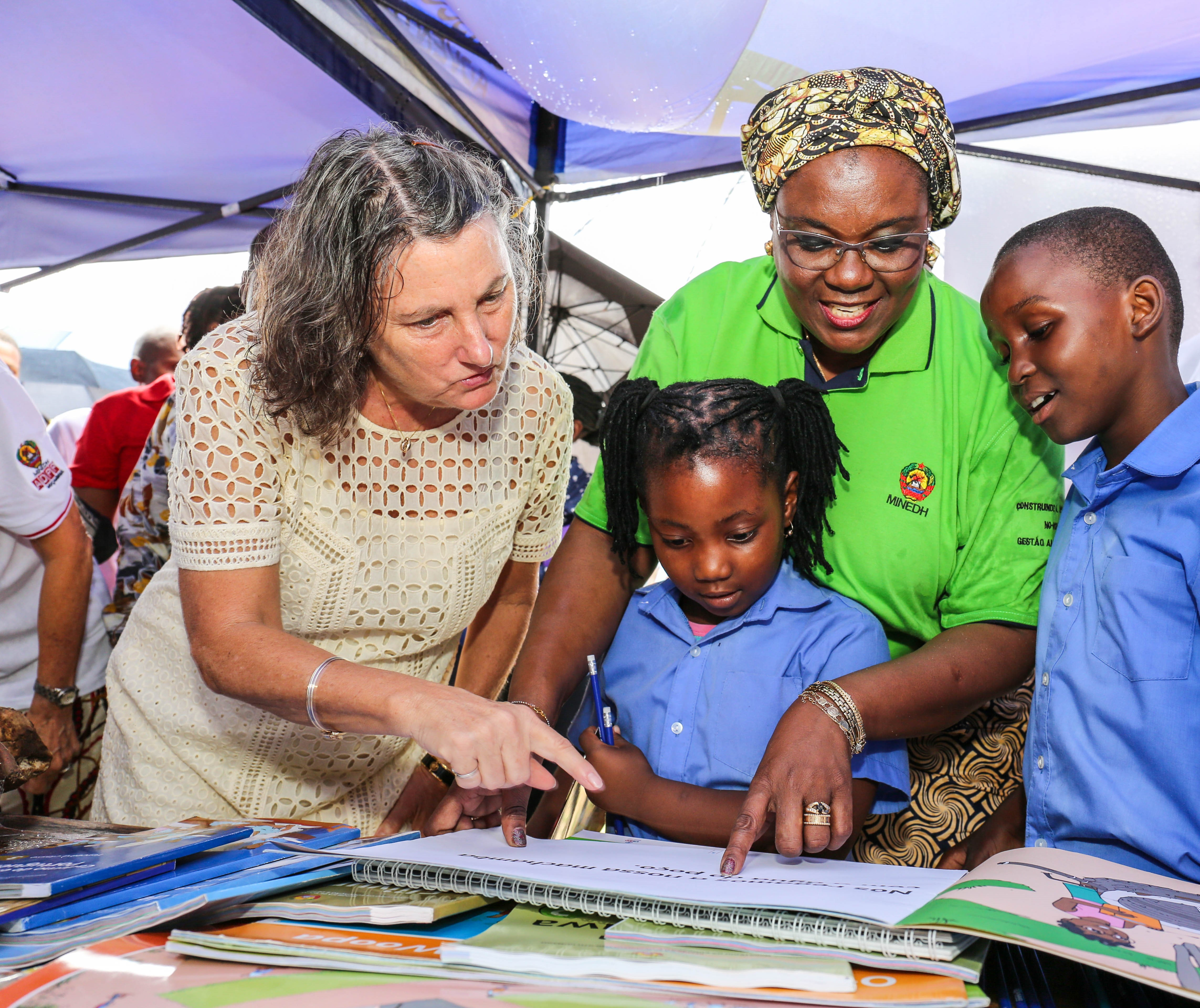
- Namashulua reading in Ronga with USAID Mission Director Jennifer Adams and children during International Mother Languages Day in 2020

Minister of Education and Human Development of Mozambique
- Incumbent
- Assumed office 17 January 2020
- Leader: Filipe Nyusi

Minister of State Administration and the Public Service of Mozambique
- In office 15 January 2015 – 17 January 2020

Personal details
- Born: Carmelita Rita Namashulua; 2 December 1962 (age 63) Dar es Salaam
- Party: FRELIMO
- Children: 2
- Education: FRELIMO Secondary School
- Alma mater: Eduardo Mondlane University; Pedagogical University

Carmelita Rita Namashulua (born 2 December 1962) is a Mozambican teacher, civil servant and politician of the ruling FRELIMO (from Portuguese: Frente de Libertação de Moçambique, translated as Mozambique Liberation Front) party. During president Filipe Nyusi's second mandate (2020–2025), Namashulua was appointed the Minister of Education and Human Development for Mozambique (MINEDH). She was previously Minister of State Administration and the Public Service of Mozambique between (2015–2020) and Deputy Minister of the Public Administration of Mozambique.

== Early life and career ==
Namashulua was born on 2 December 1962 in Dar es Salaam, Tanzania. She speaks Shimakonde, Kiswahili, Portuguese and English.

Namashulua moved from Tanzania to Mozambique as a child and was educated at the FRELIMO Secondary School in Ribaué until 1981. She studied for a degree in mathematics and physics from Eduardo Mondlane University (UEM) in Maputo and a degree in psycho-pedagogy from the Pedagogical University in Maputo. Namashulua was awarded the Socialist Emulation in 1985.

After graduating, she worked as a Physics teacher at Josina Machel Secondary School in Maputo. She then worked as the Coordinator of Support Programs for Vulnerable Women in the Office of the First Lady and as an Advisor to the National Institute of Social Action.

== Political career ==
Namashulua is a politician of the ruling FRELIMO party and since September 2006 has been a member of the Central Committee and the Secretariat of the Central Committee. In 2005, she was Deputy Minister of Public Administration of Mozambique and visited Harare in Zimbabwe to discuss strengthening co-operation and diplomatic ties between the nations.

Namashulua served as Minister of State Administration and the Public Service of Mozambique between 2013 and 2020. In this role, she tackled the fraud of 30,000 "ghost workers" on the civil service payroll, which cost the government $250m in two years, and aimed to increase the number of female primary school teachers. She has spoken to the international press about tackling state corruption in Mozambique, including "favouritism, nepotism, illicit charges for admitting people to jobs in public administration and the falsification of licences."

Namashula was then appointed Minister of Education and Human Development for Mozambique. She oversaw education closures and the reopening of primary schools during the COVID-19 pandemic from December 2020 and spoke at the Education Ministry's Coordinating Council about the estimated 1.5 billion meticais worth of damage to education buildings done by ISIS terrorists in the northern area of Cabo Delgado Province of Mozambique.

In June 2022, Namashula ordered the immediate withdrawal of sixth grade social science text book Our Continent from schools, due to errors such as the incorrect geographical and historical location of Zimbabwe and an incorrect illustration of the Mozambican parliament, the Assembly of the Republic. She also suspended the official responsible for producing the text books.

When teachers demonstrated due to a lack of overtime payments in 2022 and 2023, Namashula appealed for teachers to remain calm. She has also supported initiatives such as International Mother Language Day and World Book Day.

In 2023, Namashula announced 500 million maticais (7.8 million dollars) for the construction of unfinished schools.
