= Maputo Private Hospital =

Geography
- Location: Maputo, Mozambique
- Coordinates: 25.943013°S 32.611574°E

Services
- Beds: 105

History
- Opened: 2012

Links
- Website: www.maputohospital.com
- Lists: Hospitals in Mozambique

Maputo Private Hospital is a private hospital in Maputo, Mozambique. It cost 38 million US dollars to complete and was inaugurated by Armando Guebuza, the President of Mozambique, in 2012.

The hospital has 105 beds. The partners in the Maputo Private Hospital (MPH) are the South African company Lenmed Health, with 60 per cent of the capital, and the Mozambican group Invalco, with 40 per cent.

The hospital was planned since 2003, and permission was granted in 2009 by the government.

The hospital offers surgical, orthopedic, obstetric, paediatric and gynaecological services. It has a maternity ward, intensive care unit, pharmacy and a morgue. In the future a medical faculty, or a nursing school will be appended.

MPH recruit staff locally and abroad - but, unlike the private clinics, its staff are full time, meaning that it is not possible for a doctor to work partly in the national health service, and partly in the MPH.

According to reports in the South African press, funding is being procured from Scandinavian banks, and from South Africa's Industrial Development Corporation, while General Electric is to provide the equipment and consultancy services.
