= Adriano Nuvunga =

Mozambican social activist

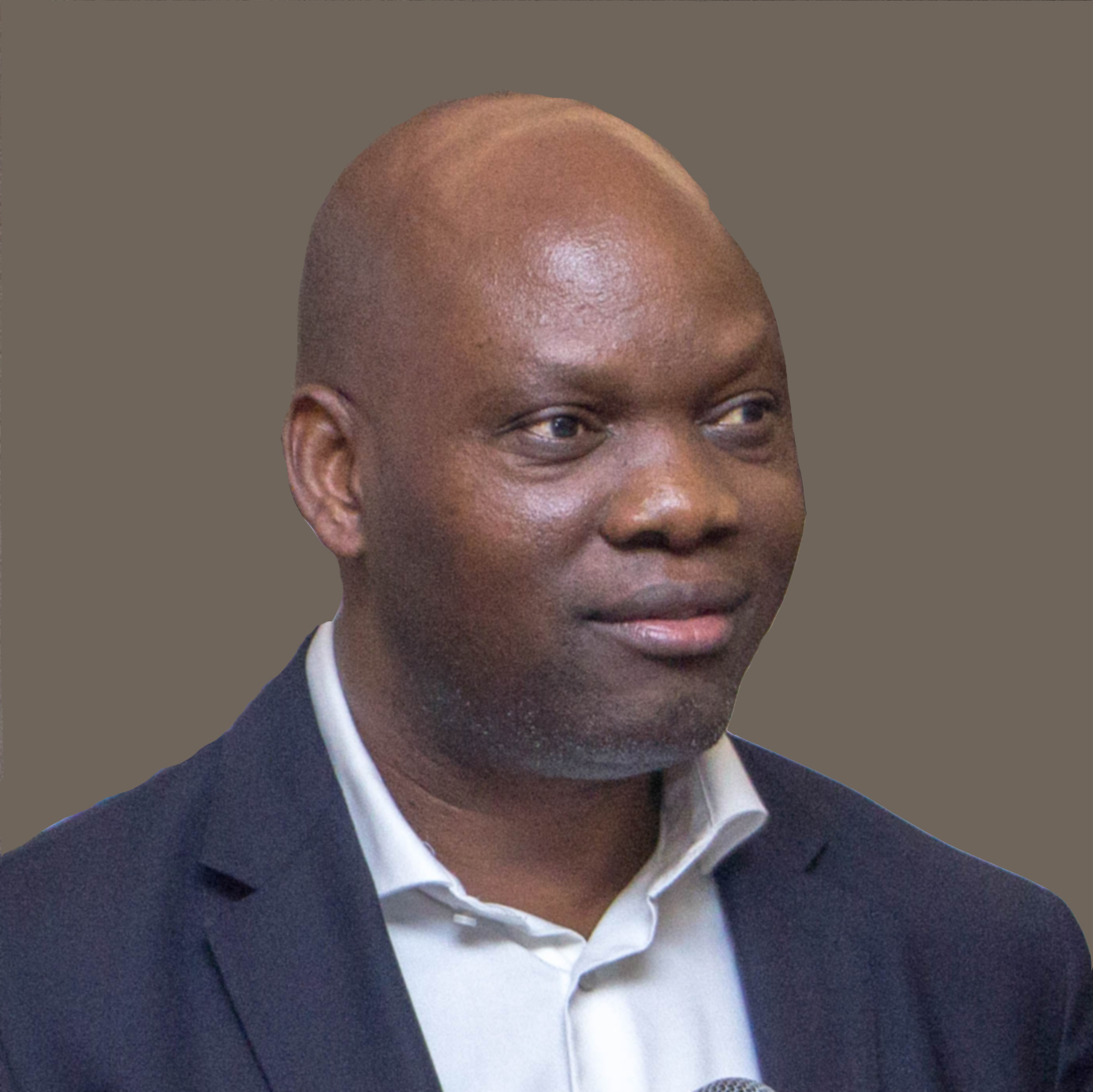
- Occupations: Social Activist; Professor

Adriano Nuvunga is a Mozambican scholar, anti-corruption advocate and human rights defender. He is the director of the Center for Democracy and Human Rights (CDD), an organization that promotes democracy and protects human rights in Mozambique.

== Early life and education ==
Nuvunga is a Ph.D. scholar.

== Career ==
Nuvunga is a professor of political science and governance at the Eduardo Mondlane University in Maputo.

He is a senior research fellow at Good Governance Africa (GGA) in Johannesburg, South Africa, where he is involved in research and discourse on governance and societal development. He is the chairperson of the Southern Defenders, a network of human rights defenders in Southern Africa. He directs the activities of the Mozambique Human Rights Defenders Network, related to human rights causes in the region. Nuvunga is a board member of the Africa Centre for Energy Policy (ACEP) based in Accra, Ghana.

He has written books on the issues of governance and human rights in Mozambique in particular and in African region in general.

In 2022, Nuvunga was included in a list of the 100 most influential Africans by the New African magazine.
