= Health care in Mozambique =

After its independence from Portugal in 1975, the Mozambique government established a primary health care system that was cited by the WHO as a model for other developing countries. Over 90% of the population had been provided with vaccination. During the period of the early 1980s, around 11% of the government budget was targeted on health care. The Mozambique civil war led to a great setback in the primary health system in Mozambique. RENAMO's attack on government infrastructures included health and education systems from 1980 to 1992.

== Health policy ==
Domestic health policy initiatives have begun making their own contributions to improvements in the country's health care, as well as through collaboration with international aid. In 2005, the Government of Mozambique formulated the National Public Investment plan – a nationwide initiative towards poverty reduction and social development. Likewise, in 2015 the Government of Mozambique released Agenda 2025, which highlighted the goals for the country's long term social and economic growth as a framework for international aid partners around the world.

In 2013, an integrated three-year plan for improved and expanded investment in public programming was implemented, including public health programming. This plan, along with a medium term expenditure framework and a strategic health sector plan laid forth a plan for the country to develop, monitor, and evaluate poverty reduction and social progression initiatives.

Through the duration of these and more social programming in Mozambique post-civil war, an emphasis was placed on improving dispersion of resources for the prevention and treatment of Mozambique's most prevalent health challenges, as well as towards improvement in public health education initiatives as a means of prevention.

Substantial improvements in access to healthcare facilities has been made since the turn of the century, with increased governmental expenditure on health, increased funding towards the staffing and training of health facilities throughout the country, and a decrease in the population per clinic average by more than 50% from 1997 to 2007.

== Medicines ==
The National Health Service depends on external financing to pay for medicine. There is considerable reliance on foreign non-governmental organizations. There is a small private sector in urban areas, and there are still traditional medicine practitioners. In the National Health Service prescribable medicines must be included in the National Medicine Form or in the List of Essential Medicines. Hospital medicine, some basic medicine and medicines distributed by Community Health Workers are free. Medicine dispensed by the primary care network in rural areas is charged at a standard rate of 20 Mozambican metical per prescription. The National Regulatory Authority of Medicines was established in 2017. The State Pharmacies Company runs community pharmacies. There is a black market and counterfeit medicine is circulated. The country has one of the lowest proportions of clinicians in the world. A National Health Service has been established, but only extends to about half the population. Those who can afford to often seek medical attention in South Africa.

== History ==
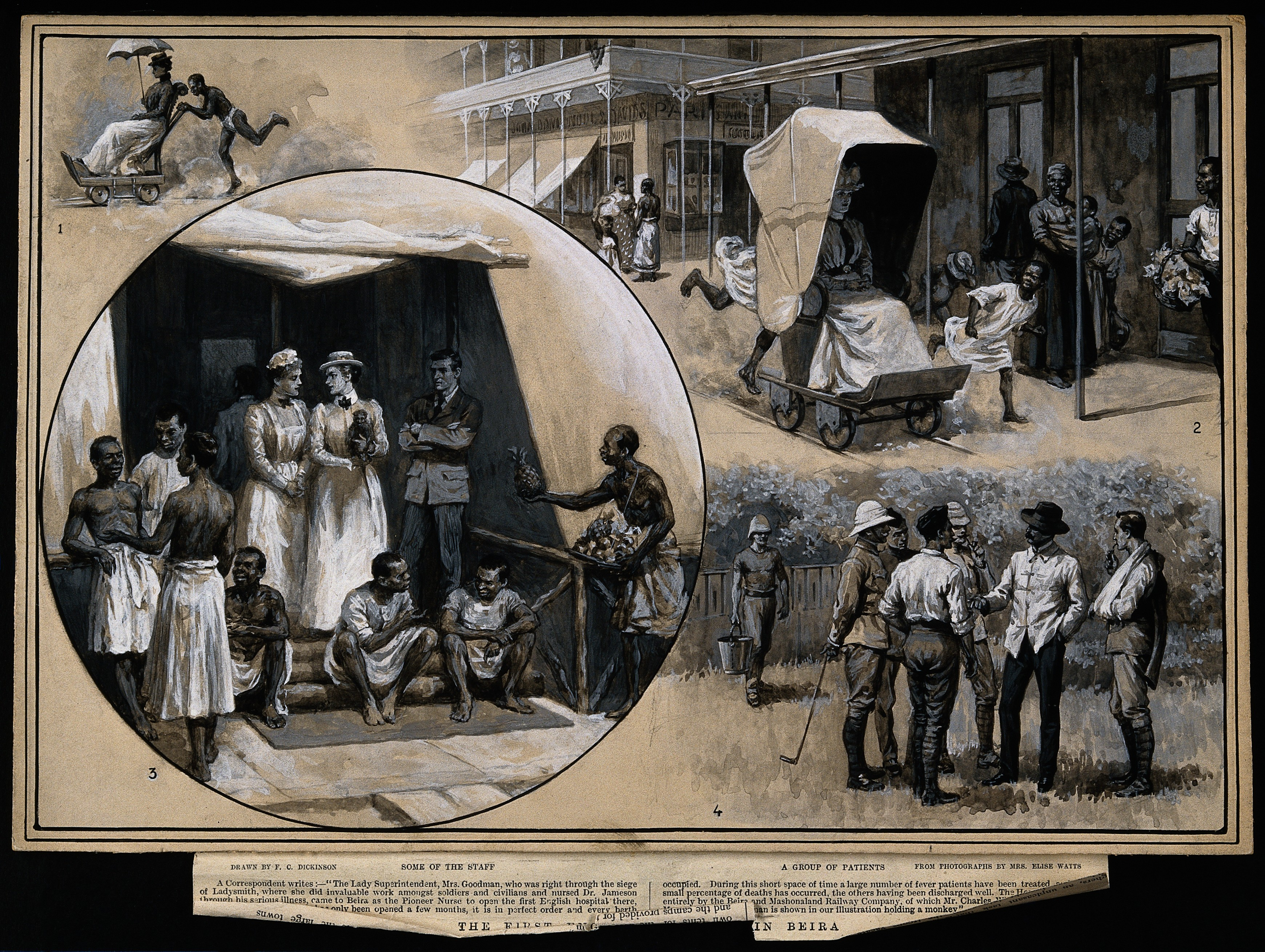
Four scenes from the first English hospital in Mozambique.

The Healthcare System in Mozambique has adopted various policies over the years in accordance with fluctuations in the health status of the population. Mozambique has experienced civic conflict, natural disasters, and more – all of which have contributed to the health challenges that the country has faced historically and in present day. One staunch divider of Mozambican history is the Civil War, which raged from 1975 to 1992. This period in history is also useful in defining periods of change in the country's health care administration.

Very little research on the subject of health in pre-colonial Mozambique exists today. However, according to historian Mario Azevedo, it has been agreed upon by experts in the field that collective national initiatives in health were not seen in Mozambique prior to the arrival of the Portuguese. Shortly after Vasco de Gama set foot on East African soil in the 15th century, colonization of the country began alongside Catholic intervention. For the next 400 years, it is suspected that like many fellow Sub-Saharan African colonies, Mozambique's health facilities were run by European Catholic missionaries in the area. The Chicuque Rural Hospital opened in 1913.

Prior to the commencement of the Mozambican Civil War in 1975, the country had already been facing conditions of hardship since the 1960s. During this time, the country was plagued with violence and poverty in accordance with its struggle for independence from Portugal. Although very little is known about health initiatives in Mozambique throughout the nearly twenty-year period of violent conflict post-independence, it is known that period acted as a precursor and risk factor for many of the most prevalent health challenges the country faces today, due to the infrastructural health, environmental health, and social health impacts of war.

=== Post Civil War ===
When the Mozambican civil war concluded in 1992, the country began making progress towards recovery through domestic and international aid initiatives.

One of the most notable international aid interventions was the Heavily Indebted Poor Countries Initiative, sponsored by the International Monetary Fund and World Bank. In 1996, this initiative began helping governments reduce the debt they were incurring through public health spending, effectively encouraging them to promote these healthy initiatives in their countries. With the aid of this initiative, federal expenditure on health care was able to increase from US$4.6 billion in 1997, to US$7.5 billion in 2002.

The funds that governments saved with the help of the Heavily Indebted Poor Countries Initiative was left in the hands of poverty-reduction strategy papers (PRSP), whose primary responsibility was to ensure access of the poor to social resources - like health care - food security, and government transparency. In Mozambique, two specific initiatives the PRSP pushed were (1) increasing community knowledge surrounding health challenges, diseases, and resources; and (2) preventing and slowing the spread of sexually transmitted diseases around the country through public health campaigns that increased public knowledge about modes of transmission and personal protection against STDs.

See also Health in Mozambique

== Hospitals ==
In 2019, there were 1,579 medical facilities in Mozambique. Besides hospitals, other facilities included rural and urban health centers. In 2020, the government of Mozambique announced plans to build 49 new district hospitals.

Hospitals in Mozambique
Name	Province	Type of hospital	Coordinates	Ref
Chiúre Hospital Rural	Cabo Delgado Province	Rural	13.3825°S 39.7844°E	
Hospital de Mocímboia Da Praia Hospital Rural	Cabo Delgado Province	Rural	11.3494°S 40.3586°E	
Hospital de Montepuez Hospital Rural	Cabo Delgado Province	Rural	13.1272°S 38.9986°E	
Hospital de Mueda Hospital Rural	Cabo Delgado Province	Rural	11.6628°S 39.5536°E	
Metuge Hospital Rural	Cabo Delgado Province	Rural	12.934616°S 40.350294°E	
Miteda Hospital Rural	Cabo Delgado Province	Rural	12.043319°S 40.145186°E	
Pemba Hospital Provincial	Cabo Delgado Province	Provincial	12.9658°S 40.4953°E	
Chibuto Hospital Rural	Gaza Province	Rural	24.6894°S 33.5328°E	
Chicumbane Hospital Rural	Gaza Province	Rural	24.9944°S 33.5506°E	
Chokwe Hospital Rural	Gaza Province	Rural	24.527439°S 33.005138°E	
Cidade Chokwe Hospital	Gaza Province	Rural	24.53528°S 33.00567°E	
Mandlakazi Hospital Rural	Gaza Province	Rural	24.7122°S 33.8861°E	
Xai Xai Hospital Provincial	Gaza Province	Provincial	25.0683°S 33.6583°E	
Chicuque Rural Hospital	Inhambane Province	Rural	23.817854°S 35.347654°E	
Hospital de Quissico Hospital Distrital	Inhambane Province	District	24.712205°S 34.439931°E	
Inhambane Hospital Provincial	Inhambane Province	Provincial	23.8792°S 35.4325°E	
Massinga Hospital Distrital	Inhambane Province	District	23.332003°S 35.382°E	
Vilanculos Hospital Rural	Inhambane Province	Rural	21.9844°S 35.3211°E	
Catandica District Hospital	Manica Province	District	18.05°S 33.17°E	
Espungabera Hospital Distrital	Manica Province	District	20.4528°S 32.7722°E	
Gondola Hospital Rural	Manica Province	Rural	19.0772°S 33.6417°E	
Hospital de Chimoio Hospital Provincial	Manica Province	Provincial	19.115652°S 33.44899°E	
Manica Hospital Distrital	Manica Province	District	18.9406°S 32.8753°E	
Chamanculo Hospital General	Maputo	General	25.950743°S 32.557036°E	
J.Macamo Hospital General	Maputo	General	25.9478°S 32.545°E	
Maputo Central Hospital	Maputo	Central	25.9673°S 32.5899°E	
Mavalane Hospital General	Maputo	General	25.9317°S 32.5858°E	
Hospital Da Matola Hospital Provincial	Maputo Province	Provincial	26.046712°S 32.334093°E	
Hospital de Xinavane Hospital Rural	Maputo Province	Rural	25.0456°S 32.8053°E	
Machava Hospital General	Maputo Province	General	25.9142°S 32.5328°E	
Manhiça Hospital Distrital	Maputo Province	District	25.4092°S 32.8081°E	
Maputo Private Hospital	Maputo Province	Private	25.943013°S 32.611574°E	
Alua Hospital Distrital	Nampula Province	District	13.9356°S 39.9251°E	
Angoche Hospital Rural	Nampula Province	Rural	16.2294°S 39.9078°E	
Hospital Central Nampula Hospital Central	Provincial	Central	15.1231°S 39.2619°E	
Marrere Hospital General	Nampula Province	General	15.1194°S 39.1894°E	
Moma Hospital Distrital	Nampula Province	District	16.7625°S 39.2228°E	
Monapo Hospital Rural	Nampula Province	Rural	14.9097°S 40.3333°E	
Nacala Porto Hospital Distrital	Nampula Province	District	14.490936°S 40.733554°E	
Namapa Hospital Rural	Nampula Province	Rural	13.7163°S 39.8226°E	
Ribaue Hospital Rural	Nampula Province	Rural	14.9464°S 38.3209°E	
Cuamba Hospital Rural	Niassa Province	Rural	14.8022°S 36.5344°E	
Lichinga Hospital Provincial	Niassa Province	Provincial	13.3108°S 35.2511°E	
Marrupa Hospital Distrital	Niassa Province	District	13.1978°S 37.4989°E	
Beira Hospital Central	Sofala	Central	19.849887°S 34.876659°E	
Hospital de Muxungue Hospital Rural	Sofala	Rural	20.3902°S 33.935°E	
Hospital Distrital Caia Hospital Distrital	Sofala	District	17.8356°S 35.3431°E	
Hospital Rural Buzi Hospital Rural	Sofala	Rural	19.8828°S 34.5928°E	
Hospital Rural de Marromeu Hospital Rural	Sofala	Rural	18.2989°S 35.9544°E	
Hospital Rural de Nhamatanda Hospital Rural	Sofala	Rural	19.2713°S 34.2043°E	
Hospital Provincial de Tete Hospital Provincial	Tete	Provincial	16.1525°S 33.5839°E	
Mutarara Hospital Rural	Tete Province	Rural	17.4514°S 35.0788°E	
Songo Hospital Rural	Tete Province	Rural	15.599°S 32.7674°E	
Ulónguè Hospital Rural	Tete Province	Rural	14.7231°S 34.3631°E	
Zumbo Hospital Distrital	Tete Province	District	15.6147°S 30.4394°E	
Alto Molocue Hospital Rural	Zambézia	Rural	15.64669°S 37.727695°E	
Gile Hospital Distrital	Zambézia	District	16.1464°S 38.3725°E	
Gurue Hospital Rural	Zambézia	Rural	15.4625°S 36.9836°E	
Maganja Da Costa Hospital Distrital	Zambézia Province	District	17.3094°S 37.5089°E	
Mocuba Hospital Distrital	Zambézia Province	District	16.8406°S 36.9875°E	
Morrumbala Hospital Distrital	Zambézia Province	District	16.89972°S 35.740693°E	
Quelimane Hospital Provincial	Zambézia Province	Provincial	17.8822°S 36.8872°E	
