= Odete Muximpua =

Mozambican water and sanitation engineer

Odette Muximpua is a Mozambican engineer, a specialist

== Life ==
Odete Muximpua was raised by her mother and grandmother in Quelimane.She was the first person in her family to go to university, topping the national entry exam to study civil engineering at Eduardo Mondlane University. One of five women in a class of 55 students, she completed her BSc in 2004. She then worked as a researcher at the university, studying sustainable water resource use and community water supplies in wetlands. In 2007 she started working at the World Bank, and returning to university to study for a Master's. In 2015 she became the first Mozambican woman to get a Master's degree in engineering.
