= Health in Mozambique =

A reference for the location of Mozambique within the continent of Africa

Health in Mozambique has a complex history, influenced by the social, economic, and political changes that the country has experienced. Before the Mozambican Civil War, healthcare was heavily influenced by the Portuguese. After the civil war, the conflict affected the country's health status and ability to provide services to its people, breeding the host of health challenges the country faces in present day.

Mozambique faces a number of ongoing health challenges including both infectious and chronic disease. Limited access to quality food and water, high levels of poverty and inaccessible health services influence health and prevalence of disease among people in Mozambique. Through national and international organizations, public programming, clinical work, and education, Mozambique is working to remedy these risk factors and to improve the health and wellbeing of its population.

The Human Rights Measurement Initiative finds that Mozambique is fulfilling 78.5% of what it should be fulfilling for the right to health based on its level of income. When looking at the right to health with respect to children, Mozambique achieves 95.2% of what is expected based on its current income. In regards to the right to health amongst the adult population, the country achieves only 80.8% of what is expected based on the nation's level of income. Mozambique falls into the "very bad" category when evaluating the right to reproductive health because the nation is fulfilling only 59.5% of what the nation is expected to achieve based on the resources (income) it has available.

== Health conditions ==
Development of life expectancy

Mozambique is plagued by a series of health conditions, both communicable and chronic. The most prevalent diseases in Mozambique include perinatal disorders, HIV, and malaria. Many of said conditions in Mozambique are a result of similar risk factors, including the leading risk factor of malnutrition.

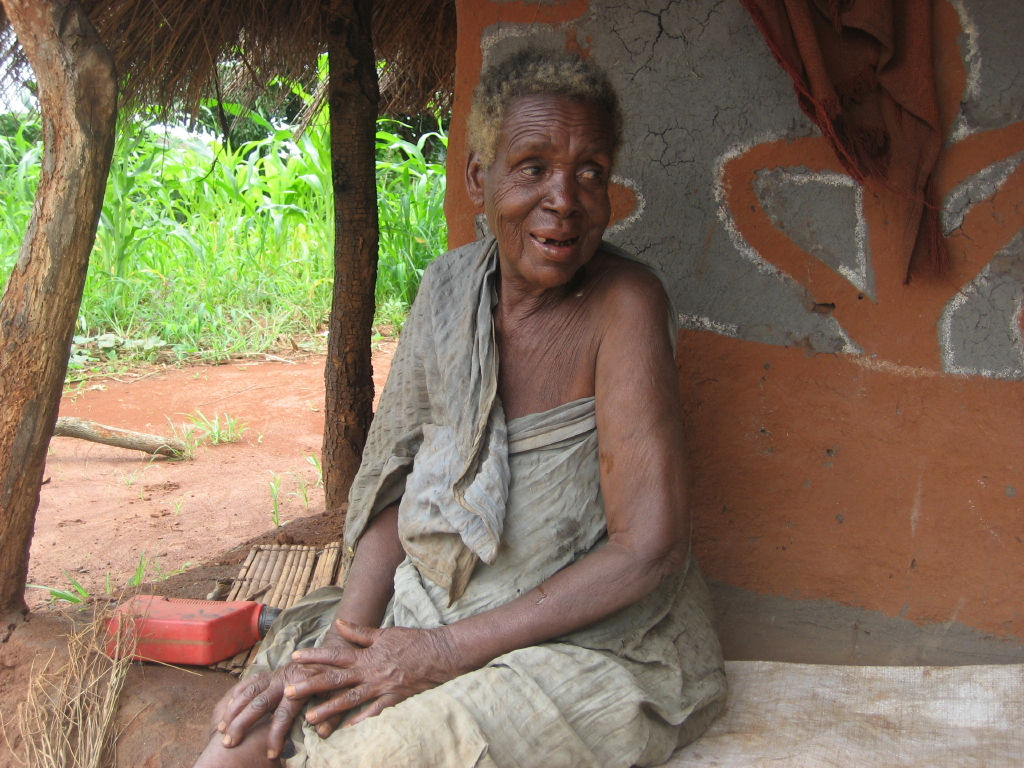
Rufina Koreia (96 years old) in front of her house in Zembe village, Manica province of Mozambique, struggling with malaria.

=== Communicable diseases ===
==== Malaria ====
In Mozambique, malaria is a major cause of morbidity and mortality, especially among children and relating to maternal mortality. For instance, a study in the early 1990s found that 15.5% of all maternal moralities in the Mozambican capital of Maputo were due to malaria.

Malaria represents approximately 45% of all outpatient cases, 56% of inpatient cases at pediatric clinics, and 26% of all hospital deaths in Mozambique. According to the Demographic Health Survey of 2011, the prevalence of malaria among children under the age of five years old is 46.3% in rural areas and 16.8% in urban areas of Mozambique. This fact is supported by a study conducted by Ricardo Thompson et al. and published by the American Journal of Tropical Medicine and Hygiene, which found that malaria is more prevalent in suburban areas than in urban areas due to a higher dispersal of infection, more nesting sites, and a less dense population, making disease control more difficult.

Malaria is endemic throughout Mozambique with seasonal peaks during and after the rainy season. The seasonal intensity of transmission varies depending on the amount of rain and the air temperature.

==== HIV/AIDS ====
In 2011, the prevalence of HIV/AIDS in Mozambique was 11.5% for civilians between the ages of 15 and 49. The distribution of HIV/AIDS throughout the country is not even, with certain provinces, including the provinces of Maputo and Gaza, having incidence rates twice as high as the national average.

In 2011, health authorities estimated that 1.7 million Mozambicans were HIV-positive, of whom 600,000 were in need of anti-retroviral treatment. However, as of December 2011 only 240,000 Mozambicans were receiving this treatment. In response to high rates of HIV incidence and low rates of treatment in Mozambique, the government implemented a national initiative to combat HIV/AIDS with anti-retroviral treatments at the day clinic level. According to the 2011 UNAIDS Report, the HIV/AIDS epidemic in Mozambique appears to be slowing, as evidenced by the fact that in March 2014 over 416,000 Mozambicans were receiving anti-retroviral treatment for HIV/AIDS.

HIV/AIDS continues to maintain a high incidence rate in females in Mozambique due to gender norms and religious involvement. According to a 2005 study by Victor Agadjanian published in the Journal of Social Science and Medicine, women are deficient as compared to men in both knowledge of HIV/AIDS infection and prevention of the disease. In the future, Mozambique may look towards religious institutions for public health campaigns related to HIV/AIDS in order to mitigate these disparities.

=== Chronic diseases ===
==== Malnutrition ====
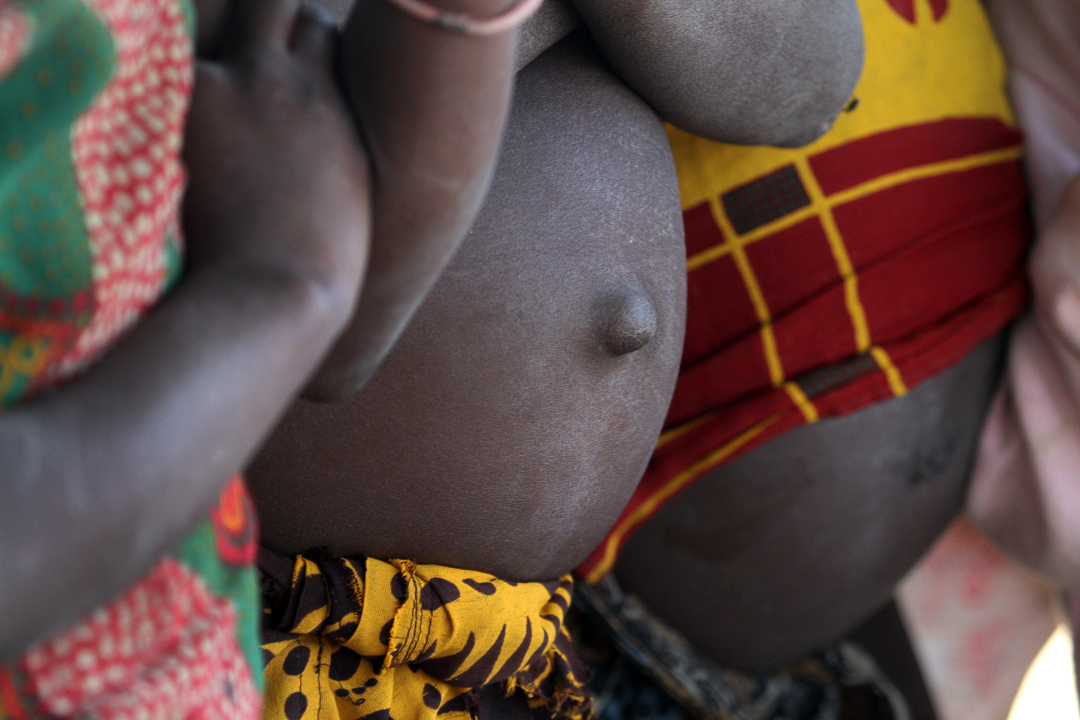
Mozambican children - often bloated bellies are a sign of malnutrition.

According to the World Health Organization (WHO), malnutrition affected 43.7% of Mozambican children between the years of 2005 and 2011. The primary causes of malnutrition in Mozambique are poor diets, insufficient food intake, and multiple and/or reoccurring infectious diseases. Similarly, in 2007 study by Cambridge University, it was found that over 2 million children suffer from Vitamin A deficiency, the most prevalent pediatric nutrient deficiency in the country. There has been steady progress over the past 20 years with declining rates of underweight children and deaths by malnutrition and its related consequences. According to a study by Jan Low et al. published in the Journal of Nutrition, Mozambique is combating this deficiency using an integrated approach of both food and supplements.

Maternal malnutrition is also a primary concern for Mozambique, as it has direct consequences on fetal and infant growth and disease prevalence. Additionally, a 2003 study by Francesco Burchi published in the Journal of Economics and Human Biology found that an increase in maternal schooling, especially when supplemented with nutritional education, significantly decreases childhood malnutrition rates of those children raised by educated mothers. Current public health interventions in Mozambique seek to reduce rates of malnutrition by studying risk factors of malnutrition and food insecurity in urban and rural areas, as well as addressing historical and current social determinants of health at the primary health care level.

==== Maternal and child health ====
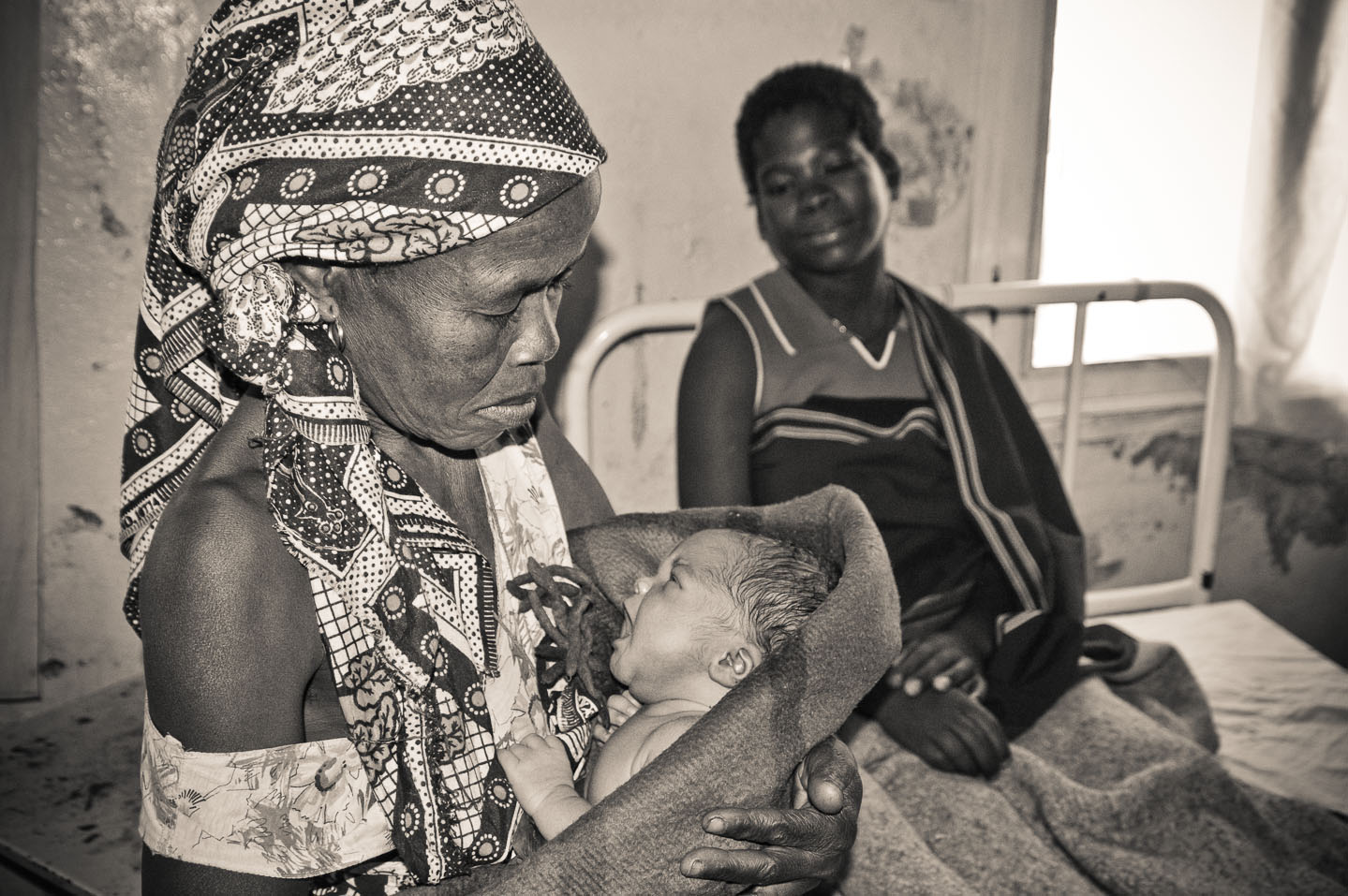
One of few delivered successfully at a health post in a rural Mozambican village.

According to a USAID report, there has been significant expansion in maternal and child health programming since the turn of the century. For example, the report cites that 97 percent of pregnant women in Mozambique now have access to pre-natal care. Additionally, the Overseas Development Institute has stated that infant mortality and child-under-five mortality rates in Mozambique have both been reduced by over 50% between the years of 1997 and 2011. Per the same source, maternal mortality rates also declined faster during this 14-year period than in any other sub-saharan country – falling from 692/100.000 to 408/100.000 between 1997 and 2011.

Health resources for pregnant women in Mozambique have also been improving in order to be more accessible in recent years thanks to overarching government initiatives in human rights, which influence access to information, education, and resources to women in need. In Mozambique 23% of women are of reproductive age and 46% are younger than 15. Because of this large proportion of women potentially requiring access to sexual, reproductive, and maternal healthcare, domestic and international initiatives have been in the works since 2000 to remove legal barriers to women's access to these services.

== See also ==
- Health care in Mozambique
- COVID-19 pandemic in Mozambique
- Suicide in Mozambique
