= Alice Banze =

Social scientist

- Born: Maputo, Mozambique
- Education: Eduardo Mondlane University; University of Pretoria
- Occupation: Social scientist
- Organization(s): Gender and Sustainable Development Association
- Known for: Member of the National Elections Commission; Gender advocacy

Alice Banze is a trained social scientist with a career in civil society organizations like Oxfam, and Gender Links and government. She is the executive director of Gender and Sustainable Development Association and a member of the UN Women-supported African Women Leaders Network. In December 2020, Banze was elected member of the National Elections Commission with the support of the Women's Forum, an umbrella grouping of Mozambican women's rights organizations.

== Background and education ==
Alice Banze was born and raised in Maputo, Mozambique. Banze attained a diploma in social science from the Francisco Mayanga Secondary School. She then pursued a bachelor's degree in law from the Eduardo Mondlane University. Banze has a degree in social sciences from Eduardo Mondlane and Pretoria University. She has undergone further training in research skills, methods and methodologies on the Feminization of Poverty Research project as a partner investigator at the Centre of Research Studies in Canberra, Australia, and also Strategic Planning and Change Management at Regenesys Business School at Sandton, South Africa.

== Career ==
Banze served as the national coordinator of the Austrian North-South Institute for Development Cooperation between 1997 and 2000. She then worked with Oxfam in various capacities. First serving as the gender and advocacy coordinator between 2001 and 2007, she was then assigned to work as the regional gender service coordinator still with Oxfam, a role she has served in from 2007. She has also served as the acting gender justice and governance lead, Pan African Program, at Oxfam from 2011. Banze was the gender, environment and climate change advisor to the minister of environment in Mozambique, implementing the Gender, Environment and Climate Change Strategy with focus on empowerment of women and communities on the best way of use and of natural resources to adapt to the climate change negative impacts. Banze is the Lusophone executive director for Gender Links, managing Angola and Mozambique Lusophone countries. Banze resigned three days after being appointed the spokesperson for the National Elections Commission (CNE).

== Works ==
=== Books ===
Banze is one of the authors of the Southern African Development Community (SADC) Gender Protocol 2014 Barometer as she is the Mozambique Country Barometer Author. She also co-edited The African Women's Protocol: Harnessing a Potential Force for Positive Change with Rose Gawaya, a book by Rosemary Semufumu Mukasa.

=== Activism ===
Most of the work that Banze has focused on has been majorly centered on gender equality. She has done this by training numerous women leadership roles as well as advocating for equal representation of women in all spheres in her country. She has also worked on the equality of women rights.
