= Catholic University of Mozambique =

University in Mozambique

- Universidade Católica de Moçambique
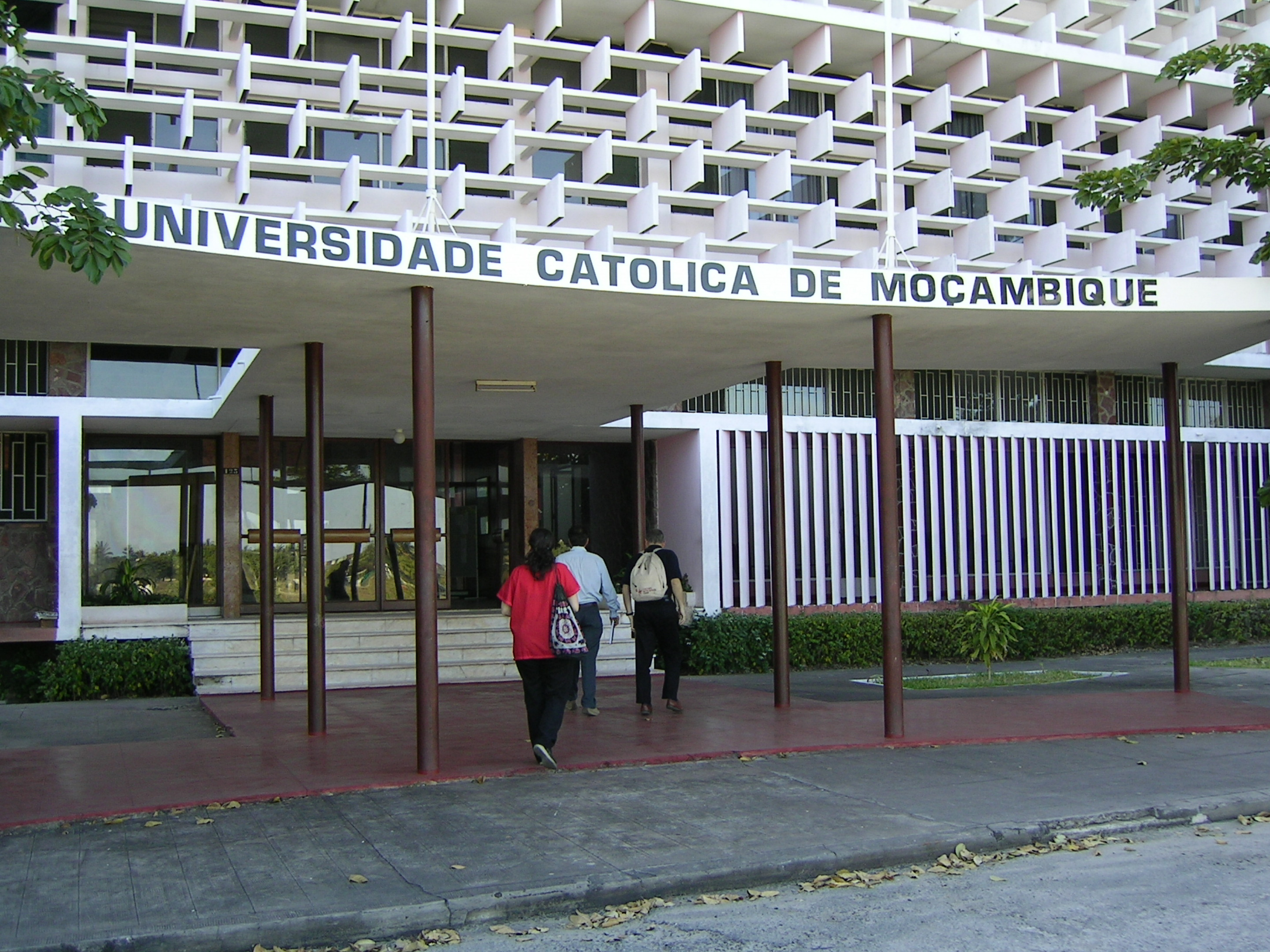
- A view of Catholic University of Mozambique
- Established: 1996
- Students: 7,000
- Location: Rua Comandante Gaivão Nº 688, Ponta-Gêa, CP 821,, Beira, Mozambique; 19.8473°S 34.8654°E
- Campus: Beira, Chimoio, Cuamba, Nampula, Pemba, Quelimane and Tete
- Website: http://www.ucm.ac.mz/

The Catholic University of Mozambique (Portuguese: Universidade Católica de Moçambique, UCM) is a university in Mozambique.

UCM was founded on August 10, 1996, by the Mozambican conference of Bishops to make higher education available to central and northern Mozambique. Before UCM's creation, higher education in Mozambique was only available in the capital, Maputo. Campuses are located in Beira, Chimoio, Cuamba, Nampula, Pemba, Quelimane and Tete. The rector is Prof. Dr. Padre Alberto Ferreira.

== History ==
The initiative to create the Catholic University of Mozambique (UCM) came up during the peace negotiations in Rome between FRELIMO and RENAMO. In June 1992, negotiations were deadlocked; later, the mediator, Dom Jaime Pedro Gonçalves, Archbishop of Beira, presented the idea to establish a quality university for the center and north of Mozambique and to correct the unequal concentration of higher education institutions in Maputo. Subsequently, this led to the signing of the peace agreement on October 4, 1992, between FRELIMO and RENAMO.

The Catholic University of Mozambique was established as an institutional compromise, and was officially founded in 1995 (Boletim da República, Decreto N° 43/95, September 14). In August 1996, UCM opened its first faculties in Beira and Nampula.

== Enrollment ==
In 2000, UCM had an enrollment of 50 students; by 2005, this had increased to 405 students; and by 2008, UCM had an enrollment of 4,497 students. In 2008?, over 7,000 students have graduated from UCM. In 2008, 64% of enrolled students were male and 36% were female.

Table 1: UCM student enrolment from 2000 to 2008
Year	Number of female students	Number of male students	Total
2000	10 (20%)	40 (80%)	50
2001	24 (36%)	43 (64%)	67
2002	50 (39%)	79 (61%)	129
2003	63 (38%)	103 (62%)	166
2004	121 (36%)	213 (64%)	334
2005	140 (35%)	265 (65%)	405
2006	234 (42%)	322 (58%)	556
2007	348 (43%)	470 (57%)	818
2008	1,627 (36%)	2,870 (64%)	4,497
Total			7,022

== Institution ==
UCM belongs to the Episcopal Conference of Mozambique. UCM is governed by the chancellor, the Archbishop of Beira, the rector, the vice-rector for finance and administration, and secretary general, and the vice-rector for academic affairs and development.

UCM currently has six faculties in four provinces:

- Faculty of Economics and Management (Beira)
- Faculty of Health Sciences (Beira)
- Faculty of Law (Nampula)
- Faculty of Education and Communication (Nampula)
- Faculty of Agriculture (Cuamba)
- Faculty of Tourism Management and Information Technology (Pemba)

UCM opened faculty delegations in Chimoio (Economics and Law), Nampula (Economics), Beira (Information Technology), Tete (Economics) and Quelimane (Information Technology and Law). Each faculty has a faculty board composed of the dean, pedagogic director and administrator. Centres only have directors.

== Finances ==
As a private institution, UCM is funded by tuition fees, sometimes by private and public scholarships. In 2008, tuition fees for a three-year bachelor program were fixed at US$1,200; tuition fees for an additional year to obtain a Bachelor of Honour's degree were set at US$1,500, the same as the annual tuition fees for the medicine faculty.

== Notable alumni ==
- Amélia Nakhare Mozambique Deputy Minister and tax expert
