= HIV/AIDS in Mozambique =

Regions of Mozambique

Mozambique is a country particularly hard-hit by the HIV/AIDS epidemic. According to 2008 UNAIDS estimates, this southeast African nation has the 8th highest HIV rate in the world. With 1,600,000 Mozambicans (11.5 percent of the population) living with HIV, 990,000 of which are women and children, Mozambique's government realizes that much work must be done to eradicate this infectious disease. To reduce HIV/AIDS within the country, Mozambique has partnered with numerous global organizations to provide its citizens with augmented access to antiretroviral therapy and prevention techniques, such as condom use. A surge toward the treatment and prevention of HIV/AIDS in women and children has additionally aided in Mozambique's aim to fulfill its Millennium Development Goals (MDGs). Nevertheless, HIV/AIDS has made a drastic impact on Mozambique; individual risk behaviors are still greatly influenced by social norms, and much still needs to be done to address the epidemic and provide care and treatment to those in need.

== History ==
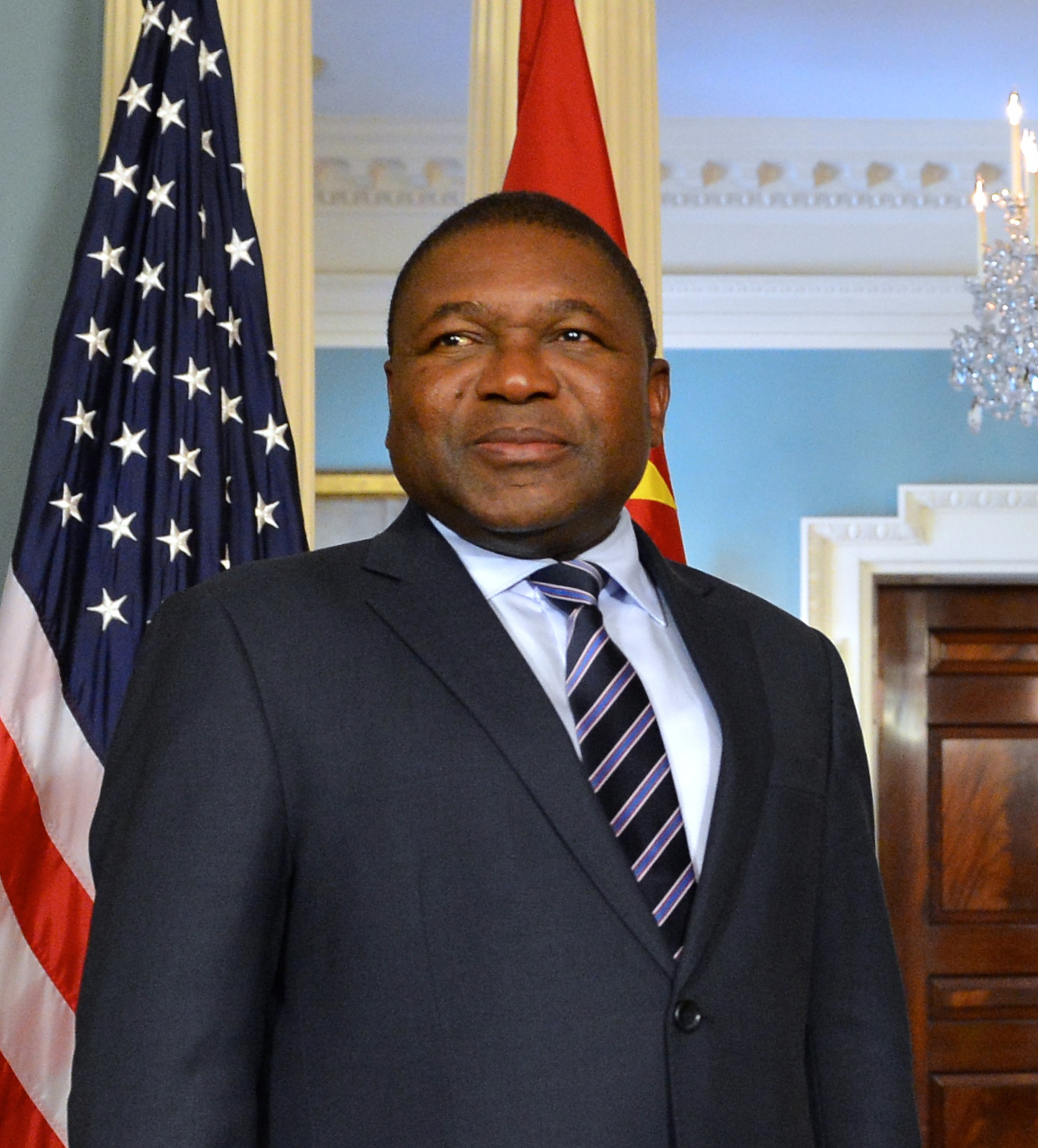
Filipe Nyusi, President of Mozambique (2017)

Beginning in 1964, the Mozambican people initiated a 10-year war of independence from Portugal. Immediately following this fight, in 1977, a 15-year civil war broke out, an event that concluded in 1992, around the same time that HIV first swept through the southern regions of Africa. As a consequence of the war, Mozambique's healthcare system was in shambles, so very little could be done to aid individuals who contracted the virus during this time, especially due to the increasingly evident effects of the end of Mozambique's national isolation and international premiere as a weak post-conflict state. However, with time, HIV began to spread in Mozambique to such high levels that the government was forced to act to save as much of its poor and dying population as possible. With this fervor, the quest to reduce the AIDS epidemic within Mozambique persists, with the country's government partnering with various outside organizations to provide treatment and care for those critically in need.

Mozambique's first case of HIV was reported in 1986 in the Cabo Delgado province. By the year 2001, HIV had infected more than one million people, 53,000 of which were children under 18 years of age and 570,000 of which were women. The first governmental response to the HIV/AIDS epidemic occurred in 1988 with the establishment of four sentinel surveys in Maputo, Beira, Chimoio, and Tete to keep track of HIV rates within the country. In 2004, antiretroviral therapy (ART) medications became publicly available throughout the nation, after having been limited to pilot programs for some years, with the help of international funding. Before the nationwide introduction of ART, only cotrimoxazole prophylaxis and drugs to diminish the effects of opportunistic infections were administered to people living with HIV/AIDS (PLWHA). In 2006, opt-out HIV diagnostic tests were offered to pregnant women for the first time. Several campaigns and organizations have launched since 1986 to combat the HIV epidemic in various ways, and by reaching various sectors of Mozambican society. Yet, since the end of the civil war in 1992, rural areas of Mozambique continue to face repercussions of the HIV/AIDS epidemic, prominently due to the inability of the nation to quickly rehabilitate as a result of inadequate funds allocated towards addressing both educational and healthcare system infrastructural repairs.

== Awareness and Risk Perception ==
Although HIV/AIDS spans across all demographic categories, and personal risk perception is generally underestimated amongst all Mozambican individuals, women and children are the groups most at-risk for infection. What's more, women and children are more likely than men to experience a general lack of awareness of the cause, transmission, and ways of prevention of HIV/AIDS.

As Audet et al. points out, high-risk activities amongst both men and women living in Mozambique may stem from the traditional and cultural customs of some subgroups of the Mozambican population, such as intravaginal practices; intergenerational and transactional sex; "widow cleansing," where a close relative of the deceased family member's wife has sex with his widow; and early sexual initiation. HIV could additionally spread through the use of unclean needles and syringes for injections and treatment within Mozambican healthcare settings. Additionally, the lack of a highly effective and efficient national blood bank could further propagate the spread of viral infection through tainted blood transfusions. Untreated coinfections, such as malaria, tuberculosis, and sexually transmitted infections (STIs) can also propagate the spread of HIV within a population through the weakening of the host's immune system. Further, the widely held belief that illnesses and disease are results of witchcraft and, as such, should be treated by traditional healers instead of local healthcare facilities may lead to the inadequate receipt of services to diminish the risk of HIV infection. General development in social acceptance of risk reduction strategies is still under way within the nation.

== Education ==
Country-wide education on ways to treat and prevent HIV/AIDS has greatly increased in recent years. The National Strategic HIV and AIDS Response Plan 2010-2014 outlined techniques for prevention—condom use and male circumcision, for example—as well as treatments like antiretroviral therapy and treatment of co-infections. These demonstrated some ways by which the Mozambican government could educate its citizens on the dire need to address the country's AIDS epidemic. Further, several studies have shown that simply educating women on the effects of HIV not only led to decreased risky behaviors in the female population, but also fostered augmented social and economic independence. Female citizens' comprehensive knowledge on HIV/AIDS varies by region, with 39.7 percent of urban women aware of HIV and its effects, as compared to 24.4 percent of rural women.

== HIV rates ==
HIV rates vary drastically by region, with southern Mozambique (City of Maputo, Maputo Province, Gaza, and Ingambane) containing the highest rate of infection (21 percent), central Mozambique (Manica, Sofala, Tete, and Zambézia) containing the second highest (18 percent), and northern Mozambique (Nampula, Niassa, and Cabo Delgado) containing the lowest (9 percent). The highest rates within the country occur within Sofala, a central province with a rate of 26.5 percent. Rate disparities are attributed to numerous factors such as: population displacement after the Mozambican civil war, ease of access to various regional provinces, similarities in health facilities, presence of groups with high risk of HIV infection in certain provinces, and similarities in social, cultural, economic, and educational levels that might impact the degree to which individuals are informed about the methods for transmission and prevention of HIV. Further, urban and district hospitals tend to have much greater ease of access to the HIV medications nevirapine and zidofudine as opposed to more rural areas of the nations. Moreover, the HIV/AIDS epidemic in Mozambique is predominantly spread heterosexually (in nearly 90 percent of adult cases) and through vertical transmission. Mozambique has the 8th highest HIV rate in the world, an 11.5 percent rate of HIV infection within adults aged 15 to 49, an estimated total of 34,000 AIDS-related deaths in individuals 15 years or older, and approximately 802,659 adults living with HIV on ART.

== Affected Groups ==
As of 2015, 11.5 percent of the entire Mozambican population (1,600,000 individuals) was infected with HIV, with women and children accounting for 990,000 of these infections. Nevertheless, infection rates of and treatment provided to each affected demographic group differ, with heterosexual transmission through sex and vertical transmission being the main causes for continued HIV infection. As of 2014, an estimated 62.5 percent of HIV-positive adults were receiving treatment.

=== Men ===
About 450,000 Mozambican males are infected with HIV, and data supports that men are much more likely than women to know of HIV's transmission pathways and take measures to avoid infection. Further, men who migrate to other regions of Mozambique or other neighboring countries for of work obligations are at a higher risk of transmitting HIV—by bringing HIV back from outer-country sexual networks or spreading it to those countries. Much of the data on men who have sex with men (MSM) living in Mozambique is unknown due to the view of homosexuality as taboo and generally unacceptable within Mozambican society, yet what is known is that MSM contribute to 5 percent of the incidence of HIV/AIDS within the nation.

=== Women ===
About 810,000 women within the country have contracted HIV. In fact, in 2007, approximately 58 percent of all adults living with HIV within Mozambique were women, and females accounted for more than three-fourths of the infected 15-year-old to 19-year-old population. This higher rate in women, as Audet et al. points out, may be somewhat accounted for by an increased biological susceptibility for contraction of the disease, as well as other socioeconomic and sociocultural factors. Women, for example, are less likely than men to understand transmission methods and, consequently, are more susceptible to infection. Further, women may engage in sexual acts to augment their sexual status and—with the help of an older man, ensure a more secure financial future, and afford higher education and daily goods. Such is a response of living in a society where women only receive 18 percent of the pay that men do. Several studies have shown that educating women not only reduces risky behavior, but also help increase social and economic independence. With increased schooling and access to information, women would be more capable of informing themselves with information provided in HIV prevention campaigns, leading to an overall reduction in their risky behaviors. Currently, an estimated 95 percent of HIV-positive pregnant women receive ART for PMTCT.

=== Children ===
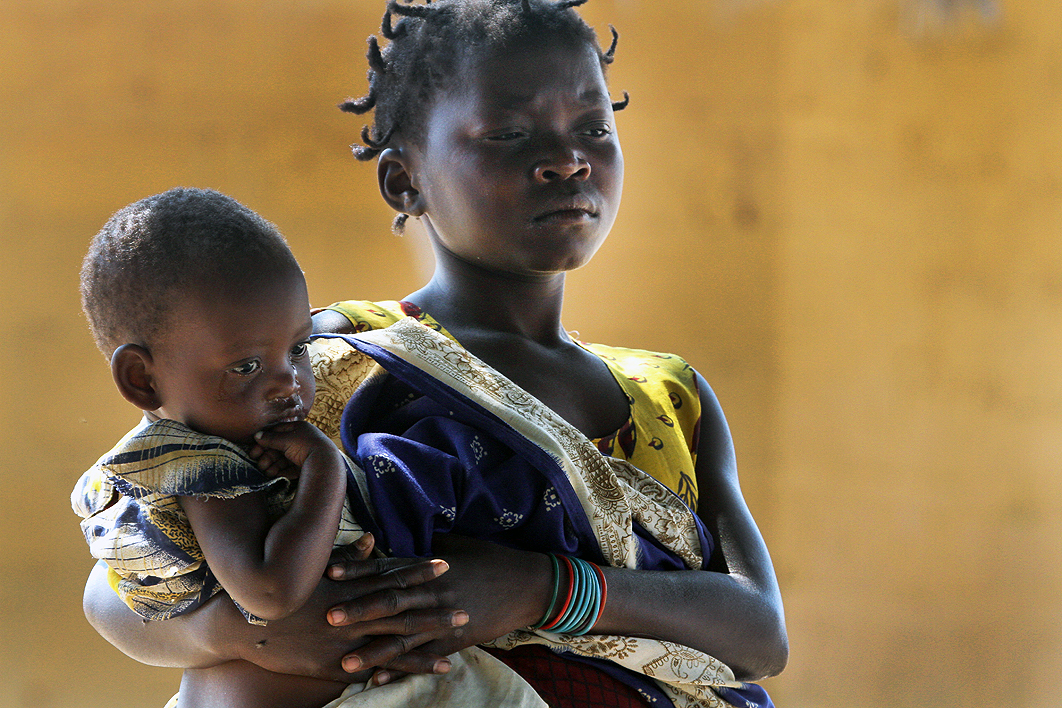
Mozambican children vulnerable to HIV infection

Mozambique ranks third in the world in new pediatric HIV infections, after both Nigeria and South Africa, according to UNAIDS. Consequently, the nation has taken great measures to begin addressing and reducing HIV within its pediatric population. With approximately 590,000 orphans due to AIDS, 180,000 of which are infected with the virus themselves, the government has begun administering antiretroviral drugs to promote early intervention in younger populations. One underlying reason behind adolescents' - and especially adolescent girls'- early introduction to and infection with HIV is the need to obtain money to stay in school and to purchase goods and food in exchange for sex work. A disparity exists regarding the comprehensive knowledge of HIV even as adolescents, with 27.4 percent of adolescent females well-informed of HIV and its effects as opposed to 48.5 percent of adolescent males. As of 2014, 36 percent of HIV-positive children were receiving treatment, yet education regarding the effects of HIV infection are commonly communicated to children through fairytales or drama sessions based on African animals or local folktales.

== HIV/AIDS' Impact in Mozambique ==
Because HIV is a sexually spread infectious that can infect individuals who rely on daily work to support themselves and their families, HIV/AIDS impacts much more than just a human's immune system. The impact of the epidemic is not uniformly distributed either. In 2005, HIV infection among adults aged 15 to 49 was estimated at 16.1 percent, and the primary mode of transmission was through heterosexual contact, with women at much greater risk for HIV infection than men. Young women aged 15 to 24 have an estimated HIV rate of 10.7 percent, compared to 3.6 percent among young men in the same age group. Nevertheless, factors such as personal knowledge of HIV and its effects, family support, and clinical confidentiality play large roles in the frequency by which HIV-positive individuals are linked to care.

A civil war restricted movement within and outside the country until 1992, but returning refugees, and economic and commercial activity since that time, have rapidly increased HIV rates to levels nearly as great as those in neighboring countries. Additional demographic groups demonstrating high HIV rates include mobile populations, people engaged in prostitution, and individuals who live close to major transportation routes. In addition to seasonal cholera outbreaks, Mozambique also suffers from co-epidemics of tuberculosis and malaria, all of which exacerbate the impact of HIV/AIDS.

In 2010, the national HIV rate was estimated at 11.5% of Mozambicans, totaling nearly three million individuals and distributed amongst 13.1% of female and 9.2% of male adults aged 15 to 49.

=== Economic impact ===
HIV/AIDS has paid its toll on the Mozambican economy, specifically by infecting and making bed-ridden those whose only method for acquiring income was physical labor. The infection with HIV of Mozambican farmers, for instance, has created ramifications throughout the entire country, causing shortages of food due to shortages of labor, as well as disruptions in the supply of and demand for basic public services. As a result of post-war recuperation, Mozambique had to rely on donor aid for quite some time. In fact, according to 2001 statistics, 82 percent of HIV/AIDS expenditures were contributed to Mozambique via external sources, meaning that the government of Mozambique funded less than 20 percent of HIV/AIDS expenses themselves. In doing so, however, private institutions and foreign aid had great influence over public health policy. Further, HIV rates within the country have highlighted disparities in financial independence—with women, who, on average earn 18% of a man's salary, much more likely to turn to high-risk behaviors such as sex work to fund living expenses and education. As a result of the economic burden of the HIV/AIDS epidemic, Mozambique's aid industry has completely restructured itself, introducing multiple new donors and initiatives—such as The Global Fund, as well as top-down policies to address the HIV problem over time. Nevertheless, as the economic impact of HIV/AIDS continues, flat-lines and decreases in donor contributions have occurred.

=== Social Impact ===
In terms of infected populations, women are more likely to be affected than men, a fact that supports the argument that gender inequalities, especially in the Mozambican workforce, are still prevalent and disproportionally lead women over men to pursue opportunities in sex work to provide for their families. Despite this, continually high rates of HIV within Mozambique, and specifically its central region, has forced the government to more closely examine gender disparities in HIV contraction and institute programs to rectify those differences. One such program created provides antiretroviral drugs to pregnant women, vulnerable children, and orphans to enforce early intervention techniques and prevent mother-to-child transmission or the propagation of the disease to future generations.

Further, sociocultural norms have significantly affected the way by which the HIV/AIDS epidemic is addressed within Mozambique. For one, stigmatization and traditional gender roles are popular dictators of Mozambicans' beliefs in regards to HIV/AIDS acquisition, treatment, and prevention. As a result, individuals who may be aware of their HIV seropositivity may be afraid to announce their diagnosis publicly in fear of communal backlash or family abandonment. In lieu of the fact that much of Mozambican men and women's societal value is based on the quantity of children produced, condom use is highly discouraged in various regions of the nation. Nevertheless, HIV-infected women must still deal with the implications of giving birth within the society. Breastfeeding is a major contributor to the spread of HIV/AIDS throughout the nation, for instance, but sociocultural norms highly encourage this method of delivering nutrients to infants over other means, such as replacement feed (which are unaffordable for many women) or mixed feeding (which would eventually result in a higher risk of HIV transmission than solely breastfeeding from one woman). Nevertheless, as of 2006, Mozambique offers opt-out diagnostic testing to all pregnant women, and as of 2010, the government was considering policy change based on multinational studies that would allow HIV-positive breastfeeding mothers access to ART medications to diminish mother-to-child transmission. Yet, issues of social stigma may arise from this occurrence as a result of the stigma associated with social and marital expectations.

=== Political Impact ===
The propagation of such a deadly disease has forced the Mozambican government to become much more proactive in addressing the epidemic. Consequently, the primary impact of HIV/AIDS upon Mozambique's political environment has been the government's provision of antiretroviral drugs to those critically in need by partnering with global organizations that help provide such treatment. In addition to this, the government has scaled up prevention measures, such as education on condom use, to minimize HIV/AIDS' transmission in the first place. As a result of several multinational studies that have supported modes through which HIV infection can be reduced, such as the administration of ART medication to HIV-positive breastfeeding mothers, the Mozambican government has been considering the implementation of policies to address these developments in HIV/AIDS research. In fact, over time, Mozambique has ratified and implemented various pieces of international legislation pertaining to the HIV/AIDS epidemic within the country: an African charter on human and people's rights (ratified in 1989), an international covenant of civil and political rights (accessed in 1993), a convention on the rights of the child (ratified in 1994), and a convention on the elimination of all forms of discrimination against women (accessed in 1997).

=== Impact on Health Services ===
Despite widespread HIV/AIDS, the impact of the disease on Mozambique's health services has been positive. Through augmented efforts to eradicate the retrovirus, prevention and care services for patients all around the country have been revamped. The Ministry of Health has created strategic healthcare plans that specifically address the epidemic, and antiretroviral treatment is being offered to more individuals now than ever before.

In spite of this, Mozambique is still falls short on manpower for its chronic healthcare system, and primary care services within the country are greatly underdeveloped. For one, 2006 estimates from Mozambican health officials approximate a presence of solely 1.26 healthcare workers per 1,000 individuals in the Mozambique population. In fact, because of the few healthcare workers available to care for patients and the continuously high HIV-infected patient influx, it was necessary for Mozambique, with the help of Médecins sans Frontières, to decentralize HIV care and treatment from hospitals to primary care clinics, as well. The HIV/AIDS epidemic within Mozambique has done much to highlight some fundamental disparities in the healthcare system, especially in terms of addressing vertical transmission, in which instances antenatal care and the provision of ART medications would significantly reduce the risk of new infections. As Audet et al. points out, vertical transmission prevention in Mozambican healthcare centers remains inadequate to address the need, yet without any type of vertical transmission prevention program in place, HIV could be passed on to 25 to 48 percent of newborns during pregnancy, birth, or breastfeeding. Patient-clinician interactions within the healthcare system can also be ameliorated by increased confidentiality, education about health information, and respect. Further, a formal relationship between traditional Mozambican healers and the Mozambican Ministry of Health in addressing the HIV/AIDS epidemic has yet to be established.

== Response and Intervention ==
As Mozambique attempts to improve its HIV/AIDS programs; and more people are reached with prevention, treatment, and care services, the capacity of Mozambican individuals and institutions to manage and deliver these services relies largely on continued and fortified prevention and treatment efforts.

According to the 2007 Human Development Report, Mozambique has approximately three physicians for every 100,000 people, and shortages of other health providers, such as nurses, pharmacists, and lab technicians, are comparable. Outside of the health system, where the multi-sectoral HIV/AIDS response depends fundamentally on community-based initiatives and volunteers, Mozambique is also severely disadvantaged, with a national adult literacy rate of only 46.5 percent (31.4 percent among women) and high levels of stigma and discrimination against people living with HIV/AIDS (PLWHA).

International organizations have even become involved with Mozambique's HIV/AIDS crisis, creating guidelines that eliminate the reuse of needles and syringes by healthcare facilities, and test for HIV in blood supplies. Yet despite Mozambique's history of attempting to address their HIV/AIDS epidemic through various pieces of legislation, HIV rates within the country still rose. For this reason, the Mozambican government began partnering with global health organizations, such as Médecins sans Frontières and UNICEF to provide palpable services, such as antiretroviral treatment (ART) to people living with AIDS (PLWA). What's more, the Mozambican Ministry of Health (MISAU) has developed an early 2000s strategic plan that focuses specifically on ways to diminish and prevent vertical transmission. In fact, Mozambique's Ministry of Health has developed legislative documents, such as the 2007 National Human Development Report, to specifically address Mozambique's current and future positions in responding to the AIDS epidemic and keeping in line with its Millennium Development Goals (MDGs).

In addition to the National Human Development Report administered in 2007, though, even more recent legislative documents, such as the more specific 2010-2014 National Strategic HIV and AIDS Response Plan, detail specific actions, such as reduction of risk behaviors, condom use, male circumcision, antiretroviral therapy administration, and treatment of co-infections, that more directly identify ways by which the HIV epidemic could be mitigated by increased and improved coverage of services. As of 2015, antiretroviral treatment covered 53% of Mozambicans aged 15 years or older.

In terms of workplace rights, the Mozambican government's Act No. 5 of 2002 bans discrimination in the workplace for people living with HIV/AIDS (PLWHA) and offers those who are no longer able to perform their work tasks due to their AIDS-related condition a guaranteed substitute occupation. In addition to this, universal opt-out testing has been implemented in all of Mozambique's healthcare facilities to facilitate HIV diagnosis and subsequent access to and provision of treatment if necessary. Voluntary Counseling and Testing (VCT) centers have been established as effective ways to disseminate information about HIV testing and ways to reduce the stigma associated with the disease to the Mozambican public.

To further propagate the responses and interventions under way by the Mozambican government, Audet et al. also points to rural community outreach to increase linkage to care and testing; education about high-risk behaviors and their reduction; strengthening the provision of healthcare; and partnerships with local healthcare professionals, such as healers and midwives, to decrease the stigma associated with HIV/AIDS. Further, integration of culturally suitable messages for HIV prevention and ART adherence, as well as inclusion of traditional healers in modern-day HIV reduction campaigns may be necessary for the long-term success of HIV programs in Mozambique. National campaigns (such as the ABC - Abstinence, Be faithful, use a Condom - campaign) are underway within the nation to target adolescents and lead them toward modifying their personal behaviors. The Mozambican government has also partnered with the U.S. President's Emergency Plan for AIDS Relief (PEPFAR) to implement evidence-based interventions in regions and demographic populations with high HIV rates.

== Outside Aid ==
Various organizations throughout the world have established programs in Mozambique that aim to address the HIV/AIDS epidemic. Médecins sans Frontières (MSF), for instance, has collaborated with Mozambique's Ministry of Health since 2001 to develop a comprehensive plan that addresses HIV/AIDS care and management throughout the country, and bring ART to low-resource settings. With the help of MSF, more than 33,000 Mozambicans were provided with antiretroviral drugs as of August 2010.

In addition to MSF, UNICEF is currently working with key stakeholders in the country to develop policies for addressing HIV/AIDS, specifically focusing on the prevention of mother-to-child transmission (PMTCT) of the disease through the introduction of early intervention techniques and the provision of pediatric antiretroviral therapy services.

Within the United States, the U.S. president's Emergency Plan for AIDS Relief (PEPFAR) provides both direct services and technical assistance to those most directly affected by HIV/AIDS within Mozambique. In fact, in 2016, PEPFAR administered antiretroviral drugs to 787,612 Mozambicans, 88,961 of which were pregnant women in need of prevention to avoid transfer to their progeny; offered support and care for 77,115 orphans and vulnerable children; and provided testing and counseling for over 4.7 million individuals in need of assistance.

In April 2024, the Global Fund, Mozambique, and health partners launched seven grants worth nearly US$771 million for the 2024-2026 period, covering HIV, tuberculosis, malaria, and health-system strengthening. The two HIV grants aimed to increase antiretroviral therapy coverage among people living with HIV to 81% by 2025 and to support differentiated treatment, care delivery, and prevention and testing approaches for key populations. A 2025 audit by the Global Fund's Office of Inspector General reported progress in HIV outcomes but found that community-based HIV prevention interventions still faced implementation and coordination gaps.

Nevertheless, in many cases for the HIV/AIDS epidemic in Mozambique, as well as many other countries, donor funding for HIV programs is flat-lining or reducing, leaving some benevolent programs pining for funds for the continuation of their services.

== See also ==
- Sub-Saharan Africa
- HIV/AIDS in Africa
- Diseases of Poverty
- Epidemiology of HIV/AIDS
- Health in Mozambique
