= Carla Louveira =

Mozambican politician

Carla Alexandra Oreste do Rosário Fernandes Louveira has been Mozambican Finance Minister since 17 January 2025.

She has a degree in economics from Eduardo Mondlane University. She was deputy minister of economy and finance from 2020.
