= Maputo University =

Public university in Mozambique

Coordinates: 25.9735°S 32.5851°E

- Universidade Maputo (Portuguese)
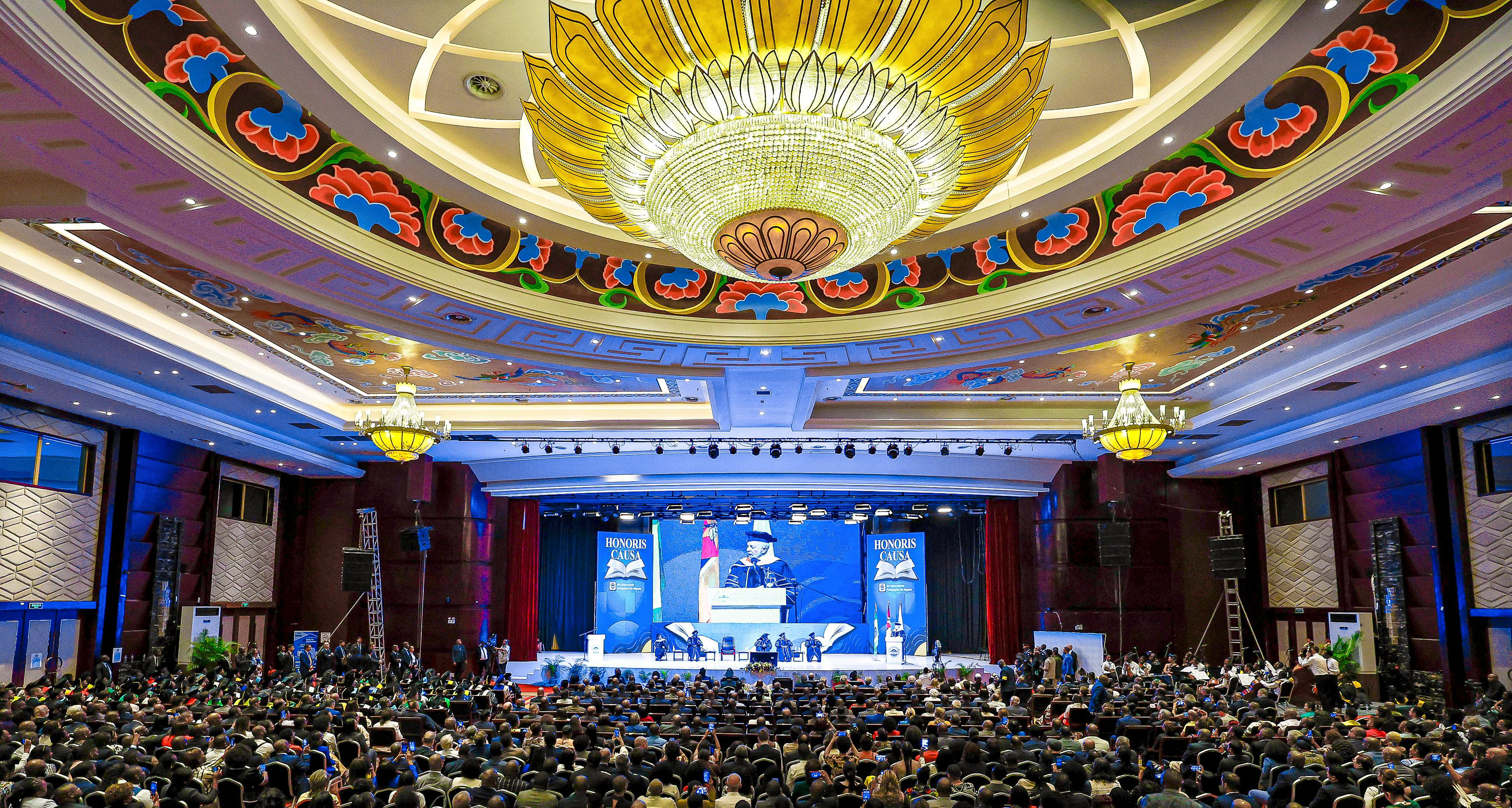
- Type: Public
- Established: 1985
- Students: 31,695 (2007)
- Location: Maputo, Mozambique
- Campus: Urban
- Nickname: UniMaputo or UM
- Website: University website

The Maputo University (Portuguese: Universidade Maputo) is one of Mozambique's principal universities. The name of the university is abbreviated to UniMaputo or UM. As a university, it was the first and the only public fully dedicated to teacher education in the country. According to the institution's founding decree, its name is Maputo University, but it is commonly referred to as Maputo Pedagogical University.

UniMaputo has its headquarters and main campus in Maputo and, until 2019, had delegations in all provinces of the country, when it was affected by an extensive administrative reform that limited its competence to the national capital.

There are over 16,000 students attending the UniMaputo system.

== History ==
The Maputo University (UniMaputo) was founded in 1985 as a Higher Pedagogical Institute (ISP), by Ministerial Diploma No. 73/85, of December 4, as an institution dedicated to the training of teachers for all levels of the National Education System and education staff. At its inception, the institution operated at the facilities of the General Joaquim José Machado Preparatory School in Maputo.

In 1989, the Beira campus came into operation, occupying the premises of the then Patrice Lumumba Commercial School. The ISP then becomes the first top institution to have a campus outside the nation's capital.

Still in 1995, ten years after the institution's opening, the ISP becomes a university under the name Pedagogical University (UP), with the approval of the statutes, supported by Presidential Decree 13/95, of April 25.

In 2019, after a profound administrative reform, the university was reduced to Maputo city, and its delegations outside the national capital became Save University (former Sagrada Familia Pedagogical University), Púnguè University, Licungo University and the Rovuma University. The same reform changed the historical name of UP, renamed Maputo University (UniMaputo).

== Student enrollment ==
In 2007, UniMaputo had 31,695 contact students and 506 distance students. Most of these, 31,157, are full-time with a reported 538 part-time students. The questionnaire response also noted that three students were from SADC countries and four from other countries (excluding the SADC region).

== Alumni ==
- Carmelita Namashulua (born 1962), politician and Minister of Education and Human Development for Mozambique, previously Minister of State Administration and the Public Service of Mozambique (2015–2020)
