= Maputo Central Hospital =

Hospital in Maputo, Mozambique

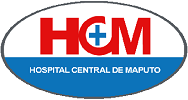

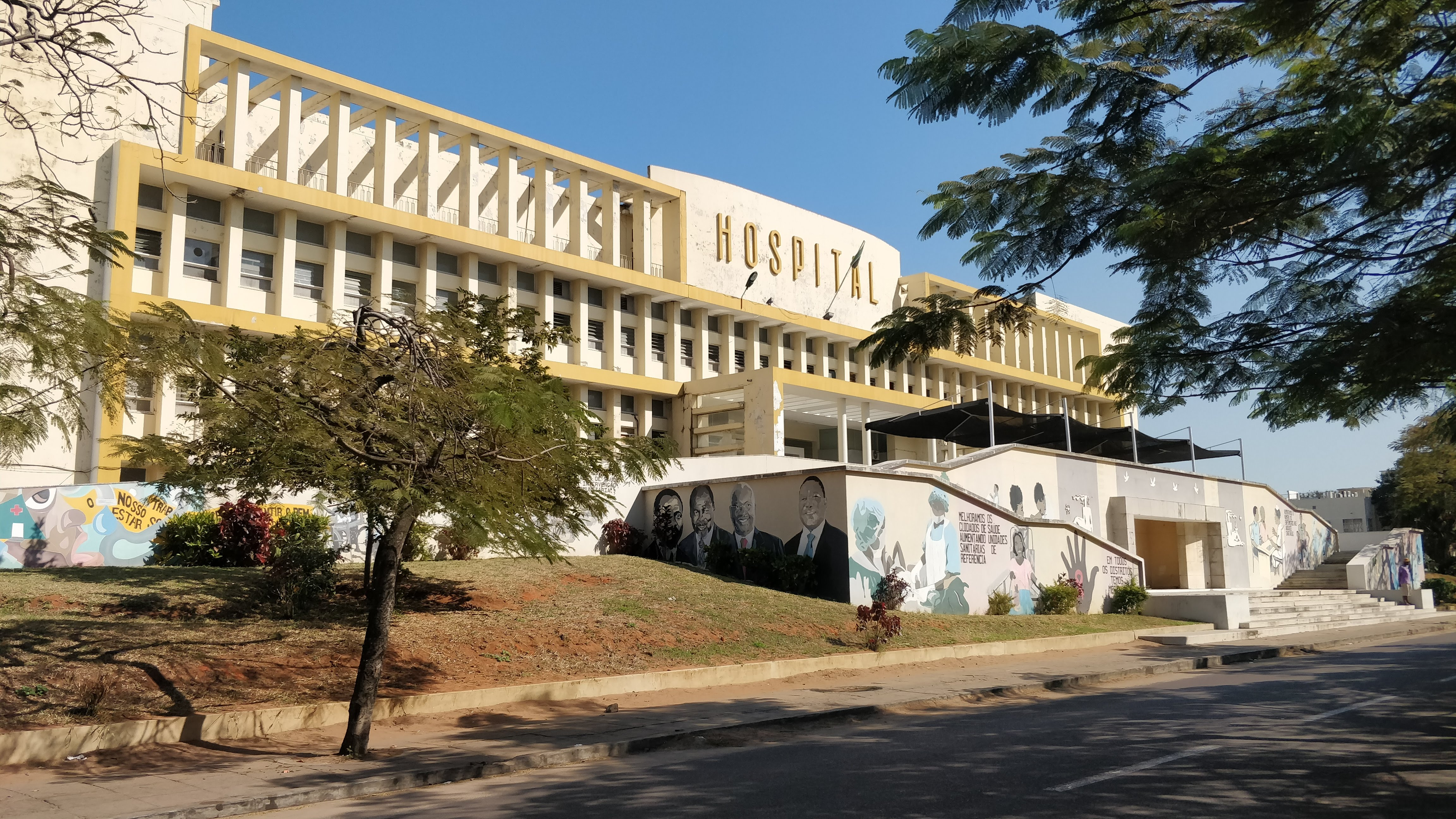

Geography
- Location: Mozambique
- Coordinates: 25°58′2.87″S 32°35′23.07″E

Services
- Beds: 1,500

History
- Founded: 1900

Links
- Lists: Hospitals in Mozambique

Maputo Central Hospital is a multi-block specialist referral hospital in Maputo, Mozambique. It was established during Portuguese rule in around 1900. Its departments include medicine, surgery, paediatrics, orthopedics, gynaecology and obstetrics. It has around 1,500 beds and 4,000 employees.
