= 2024–2025 Mozambican protests =

National post-electoral protests

- Part of Gen Z protests
- Date: 11 October 2024 – 24 March 2025 (5 months 13 days)
- Location: Maputo; All 11 provincial capitals
- Caused by: Electoral fraud in the 2024 Mozambican general election
- Goals: Release of tabulated votes Fresh elections Resignation of Daniel Chapo
- Methods: Street protests, barricades
- Result: Protests dispersed: Chapo inaugurated 15 January; Chapo and Mondlane reach amnesty agreement for protesters 23 March

Parties
Government of Mozambique; Mozambique Defence Armed Forces; Mozambican Presidency; Assembly of the Republic; FRELIMO	"Government of National Unity": PODEMOS; MDM; New Democracy; RENAMO

Lead figures
Filipe Nyusi; Daniel Chapo; Cristóvão Chume	Venâncio Mondlane; Lutero Simango; Ossufo Momade

Number
	1.5-million protesters (November 7)

Casualties
- Deaths: ~400
- Injuries: Hundreds
- Arrested: Hundreds

Between 11 October 2024 and 24 March 2025, demonstrators in Mozambique have mounted protests against the 2024 Mozambican general election.

== Background ==
General elections were held in Mozambique on 9 October 2024 to elect the president, the 250 members of the Assembly of the Republic and members of the ten provincial assemblies.

The ruling FRELIMO party, which has increasingly become marked with growing concerns of authoritarianism and impunity amid the controversies surrounding the 2023 local elections and the 2019 general election, was declared the winner of the election, with its leader, Daniel Chapo, proclaimed as president-elect. This was disputed by Venâncio Mondlane, with his party PODEMOS claiming Mondlane had received 53% of the vote using data from their poll observers. The result was also questioned by the Episcopal Conference of Mozambique and the European Union.

== History ==
=== October 2024 ===
While counting on the election was underway on 11 October, Venâncio Mondlane threatened to launch a nationwide strike if FRELIMO declared victory. That same day, observers from the European Union and the European Parliament demanded that central election authorities release all voting details from all voting places. Despite having the data, the central election authorities have refused to do so. The EU observers later said that there had been "irregularities during counting and unjustified alteration of election results at polling station and district level". Mondlane later set the strike to begin on 21 October. On 16 October, four people were arrested during a march led by Mondlane in Nampula. Observers from the US-based International Republican Institute also noted instances of voter intimidation, vote-buying and inflated voter rolls in FRELIMO strongholds.

On 14 October, Lutero Simango and the Democratic Movement of Mozambique announced that they would be rejecting any official vote count due to "many irregularities and manipulation" and would be officially challenging the election in court. One of the main issues the MDM have had with the election is one of their voters was arrested without charge in a polling place in Ribáuè. The MDM also announced that they were conducting a parallel vote count which they will release when the official vote is released for comparison.

On 16 October the Attorney General of Mozambique summoned Venâncio Mondlane for violating the Mozambican Constitution, arguing that Mondlane and his supporters performed "electoral offences, irregularities, common crimes and the violation[s] of ethical-electoral norms." Mondlane had claimed victory which the Attorney General classified as "incite[ing] violence, [and] public disorder". Mondlane is also publishing results from his parallel vote count which the attorney general classified as "behavior that violates ethical and electoral principles and norms."

On 17 October Angolan writer José Eduardo Agualusa criticized Venâncio Mondlane for "an attitude of little democratic maturity" and that Mondlane was trying to "subvert the constitution." Agualusa also called on the ruling government to hold Mondlane "accountable for those statements" and that his strong performance, even though he did not win, was “the great revolution” of the current age and as such he needs to be more responsible. Agualusa also said that "Renamo, in fact, is the big loser in this process."

The Mozambican police reported that on election day there where 38 cases of electoral crimes resulting in the arrest of 37 individuals. It also reported 60 electoral offenses resulting in 39 arrests from the period of 24 August to 6 October. On 18 October, Elvino Dias, a lawyer working for PODEMOS and one of Mondlane's advisors, was shot dead in his car along with the party's spokesperson, Paulo Guambe, by unidentified attackers in Maputo. At the time of his death, Dias was preparing to submit a case to the constitutional court contesting the result. Mondlane accused the security forces of responsibility, while the EU, the African Union, the United States and Portugal condemned the killings. On 21 October, police fired tear gas at Mondlane while he was giving out interviews at the site of Dias and Guambe's murders. Mondlane said that police tried to prevent him from going outside to participate in protests. Protests also broke out in Maputo, Beira, Nampula and Gaza Province that same day as part of the strike called on by Mondlane, resulting in the arrest of six people and injuries to 16 people including two journalists.

On 23 October the European Union observers released a statement that the government performed "unjustified alteration" and that the results of the election had been doctored in FRELIMO's favor while the U.S State Department demanded an investigation and rejected political violence. Additionally, the Episcopal Conference of Mozambique urged election officials to not "certify a lie" with Archbishop Inácio Saure saying that certifying Chapo as victor was a "lie" and "fraud" while also saying "Mozambique must not return to violence."

On 24 October, Mozambique's US dollar bonds dropped due to a massive selloff while the opposition called for a "revolution." Also on 24 October, Chapo denounced the protests, stating that "[FRELIMO] are an organised party that prepares its victories."

On 25 October riots broke out across the country after the government announced that Chapo won and closed the border crossing with South Africa at Ressano Garcia. Makeshift barriers blocked main roads in Maputo, with protesters claiming they have "nothing to lose" due to the poor economic state the country has been in since TotalEnergies delayed the construction of a $20 billion natural gas plant due to the insurgency in Cabo Delgado. Mondlane stated in a live-stream that the election results of 71% for Chapo were "totally absurd" and that "The revolution has arrived... The time has come." During these riots, Mozambican security forces killed at least 11 protesters and used live ammunition and tear gas to clear crowds which was met with heavy criticism from Human Rights Watch. Additionally, another 50 were injured and over 400 protesters were arrested in a two-day period from 24 to 25 October.

On 27 October PODEMOS formally filed an appeal with the Constitutional Council against the results.

On 28 October Mondlane called for the formation of a rival "Government of National Unity" consisting of all opposition parties to form a united front against FRELIMO. All opposition parties except RENAMO joined this coalition, including New Democracy and MDM.

Incumbent President Filipe Nyusi urging residents to stay home amid protests. On 29 October Mondlane called for a week-long strike, and for a 4-million strong march on Maputo on 7 November to overwhelm Mozambican authorities with the sheer size of a protest. The 7 November protests also led to clashes with police. Mondlane also fled Mozambique and said that he was not in Africa. Mondlane claimed that 1.5-million protesters participated in the rally in Maputo on 7 November.

On 31 October, RENAMO announced that they were preparing to release their parallel vote count, stating they had won the popular vote in two provinces. Its leader, Ossufo Momade, also accused FRELIMO of fraud and claimed to have won the election. Additionally, Amnesty International called on Mozambican authorities to stop using deadly force on protesters. It also accused the government of blocking access to internet and media websites.

=== November ===
On 5 November, defence minister Cristóvão Artur Chume called the protests an attempt to overthrow the government and deployed the army to restore order. The South African government closed the Lebombo border crossing with Mozambique following violent protests and barricades on the Mozambican side. Fifteen officials from the Mozambican border post fled to South Africa seeking shelter from the violence. By 6 November, Human Rights Watch counted at least 30 deaths since the start of the protests, while the Centre for Democracy and Human Rights put the death toll at 34. The government said that a police officer was also killed. HRW later said that at least ten children were among the dead.

Also on 6 November, the Constitutional Council gave the CNE 72 hours to explain discrepancies in the number of voters in the election, with there being ~170,000 "fake votes" for FRELIMO. Additionally, the Mozambican Bar Association released a statement that annulling the elections is “one of the equations that should be on the table” in the dialogue to stop the violence.

On 7 November, at least three people were killed and 66 others were injured during the renewed protests in Maputo. Several instances of looting where reported.

On 8 November, Catholic Bishops from South Africa, Botswana, and Eswatini wrote a letter calling for “authorities to address the causes of disgruntlement” and to "respect the will of the Mozambican people" and called on the Southern African Development Community to intervene. Mondlane also stated that protests would continue until the election results were overturned. Additionally, the MDM called for the recount of all votes or a repeat of the elections in order to restore “electoral justice.”

On 12 November Mondlane called for a three-day nationwide protest "at the borders, at the ports and in the provincial capitals. All 11 provincial capitals" while also denouncing government claims that he was trying to stage a coup, saying "If we wanted to carry out a coup d’état, we would have done it." On 15 November, the government imposed a ban on protests. It also filed a lawsuit against Mondlane for damages incurred during the protests valued at over 30 million meticais.

Regional watchdog and observer group Election Resource Centre Africa criticised the conduct of the Government amid the protests, reminding the Government of its commitments to the SADC Principles and Guidelines Governing Democratic Elections, which places a commitment on the Mozambican government to take all necessary measures and precautions to prevent political violence.

S.A.D.C. called an extraordinary summit on Mozambique on 20 November in Harare, Zimbabwe.

By 22 November, six police officers had been killed, and another 69 injured, while the death toll from protesters continued to climb, with some of the protesters shot dead by police being as young as 16.

On 23 November, Mondlane finally relented and issued his conditions for talks with the government which includes dropping any legal cases against him, the release of all those who were arrested for participating in the protests, and a 20-point plant for the "re-establishment of the electoral truth" which would create a mechanism for criminal and civil liability for those involved in falsifying the electoral process.

On 24 November the governments of the United States, Britain, Canada, Norway, and Switzerland jointly condemned the escalating violence against civilians in Mozambique and demanded an investigation into the deaths of 67 civilians. Human Rights Watch reported that at least 10 of the dead where children, and that the deteriorating security condition was preventing thousands of students from going to school. Mozambique's bishops designated the 24th as a National Day of Prayer for peace and reconciliation.

Mondlane's conditions for ending the protests were never met, and as such he boycotted a meeting with Chapo on 27 November and instead livestreamed his supporters.

On 28 November a video of a Mozambique Defence Armed Forces armored vehicle running over a protester went viral as the military continued to use deadly force to clear barricades from provincial capitals with at two protesters being shot dead in Nampula the day before.

=== December ===
On 2 December, Mondlane called for the protests to continue for another "two to three months" so that "the country will become unfeasible [to govern]" with the death toll now reaching 67 and gave an interview to the BBC where he claimed to have spent some time during the earlier stages of the protests in hiding in South Africa due to credible threats to his life. Mondlane also stated that if FRELIMO doesn't cave to protesters that he will stand again in the 2029 Mozambican general election.

On 23 December, the Constitutional Court confirmed FRELIMO's victory in the election. Protests against the announcement left at least 125 people dead (including at least 33 prisoners killed during clashes with prison staff as they tried to escape). Mondlane refused to recognise the decision and said that he would hold his inauguration as president on 15 January 2025. By 27 December, the government's security forces were regaining control of the capital's roads after days of riots and looting. At other cities, violent attacks on police stations and tolling stations had been reported. About 1,500 to 2,500 inmates had been able to escape from a major prison amid the unrest. Journalist Dominic Johnson argued that Mozambique's situation remained critical and that the violence had the potential to escalate into a civil war.

On 29 December, Mondlane announced a five-day suspension of protests to allow for humanitarian and international organizations to visit Mozambique and assess the human rights situation.

=== January 2025 ===
Mondlane returned to Mozambique on 9 January. Security forces fired tear gas at hundreds of Mondlane supporters who gathered to welcome him near Maputo International Airport. During his arrival Mondlane stated that: “I, Venâncio Mondlane, elected president by the Mozambican people,”

On 13 January the Mozambican parliament opened its first session, which was boycotted by two of the three opposition parties. The parliament building was surrounded by armed soldiers and police to deter the large crowd of protesters gathered outside as most of the capitals city center was under control of protester barricades. Mondlane called any politician that participated in the opening of parliament as performing a "betrayal of the will of the people."

On 15 January, Daniel Chapo was inaugurated as president of Mozambique. After the ceremony, police fired guns to disperse crowds that had gathered near the event at Praça da Independência in Maputo. At least seven people died during protests on that day in Maputo and Nampula. Many African leaders avoided the inauguration, with a notable exception being South Africa's Cyril Ramaphosa.

Following Chapo's inauguration, Mondlane said he would suspend protests for the first 100 days of Chapo's term and was open to serving in Chapo's government on condition that he release 5,000 people detained for participating in antigovernment protests, pay financial compensation to relatives of those killed by police during the protests and provide free medical treatment for about 200 people injured by police.

On January 22 Chapo would form his cabinet including Maria Benvinda Levi as Prime Minister, Carla Louveira as finance minister, and Estevão Pale as the mineral resources and energy minister. It is estimated by the government of Mozambique that they have lost about 42 billion meticais in revenue due to the unrest. Additionally, refugee camps in Malawi for those fleeing the violence from the protests have swelled to 13,000 straining Malawi which is undergoing a drought.

On January 24, Chapo would sack Bernadino Rafael, Mozambique's police chief, due to his heavy-handed approach to the protests which have led to the deaths of over 300. However, Chapo also denied claims from Mondlane that the government was kidnapping and disappearing pro-democracy opposition figures. Later that day Mondlane also made a statement that their fight was "far from over" and denied claims that he plans to join Chapo's government as a minister.

=== February ===
On February 4, Al Jazeera published an op-ed calling for a SADC military intervention into Mozambique arguing that failure to do so would cause Mozambique to become a failed state. SADC was one of the few international organizations that claimed the elections were free and fair but has also taken steps to try and pressure the Mozambican government to talk to the opposition to resolve the crisis diplomatically.

On February 27, Amnesty International called on the Mozambican government to investigate the murder of 300+ protesters by government forces and to punish those responsible. Additionally, Amnesty noted that dozens of anti-FRELIMO activists and several non-partisan journalists had been forcibly "disappeared" by Mozambican security forces.

The following day on February 28, the United Nations issued a report from their investigation into Mozambique, stating that the nation faces a "triple crisis" of climate shocks, conflict, and deteriorating socioeconomic conditions stating that "the crisis in Mozambique requires more attention" and called for increased humanitarian aid to assist the internally displaced Mozambicans.

=== March ===
On March 5, Mozambican security forces attempted to disperse a rally held by Mondlane using live ammunition and crashing a police armored-car into the point car of Mondlane's convoy as he arrived, and opening fire into the convoy, injuring a member of his entourage and at least 16 protesters as well as killing 2 protesters. Afterwards Mondlane again fled the country for a few weeks before returning in late March. The police denied that the attack was an attempt to kill Mondlane but was instead a routine dispersal of protesters. Additionally, the Portuguese foreign ministry offered condolences to those killed at the rally. The protest had occurred outside of a meeting called by Chapo, attended by other members of the opposition, notably barring Mondlane.

On March 24 Mondlane announced he had met with Chapo and published a picture of them shaking hands, stating that FRELIMO had agreed to some concessions, namely releasing political prisoners, and compensating those injured and the families of protesters that were killed. Mozambican legal experts considered this dialogue as "breaking the ice" for future meetings, and as the beginning of the end of the protests.

== Aftermath ==
In total, the Mozambican state announced that 22 members of its security forces were killed during the protests with another 178 being seriously injured.

Mondlane attempted to form his own political party: National Alliance for a Free and Autonomous Mozambique, or "ANAMALALA" whose acronym generated controversy as it means "it's over" or "it's finished" in the Macua language, with the Mozambican Ministry of Justice viewing the "it" as FRELIMO, and demanding Mondlane change the name. Mondlane refused, with the issue threatening to reopen protests. Eventually Justice Minister Mateus Saize backtracked, saying he never gave the order to change the name and that the Justice department had made no such decision.

On June 26, then Public Prosecutor's Office opened investigations into a "coup", claiming that the protesters where plotting the overthrow of the Mozambican government. The Democratic Alliance Coalition (CAD), led by Manecas Daniel and Justino Mondlane denied that the protests never attempted to overthrow the government. CAD was created during the tail end of the protests to coordinate minor pro-democracy parties in supporting Venâncio Mondlane.

== Demographics of the protests ==
Various sources refer to the 2024-2025 Mozambican protests with the label of "Gen Z protest", due to the dominating presence of people from Generation Z within the protests.

According to the Plataforma Decide report, which monitors electoral processes within Mozambique, 78% of the detained protesters were between the ages of 18 and 35, making most of the detained people from either Generation Z or late Generation Y. Amnesty International also noted the notable presence of young people, with some of the people involved being as young as 14 years old.

== See also ==
- 2024 Mozambican general election
- 2024 Georgian post-election protests
- 2024 Venezuelan protests
