= Venâncio Mondlane =

Mozambican politician

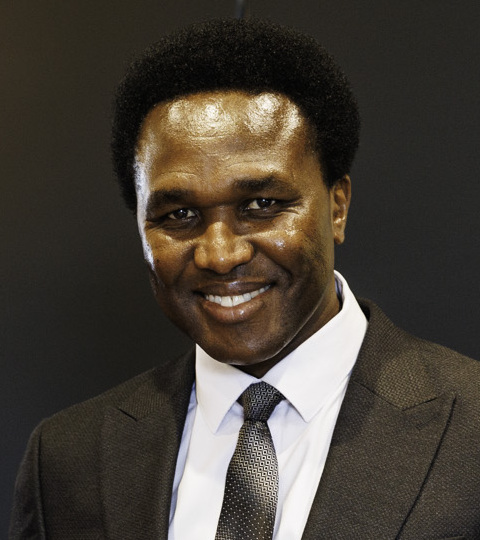

MP of the Assembly of the Republic
- In office 2020 – 3 June 2024

Member of the Municipal Council of Maputo
- In office 2024 – 26 April 2024
- In office 2014–2015

Personal details
- Born: Venâncio António Bila Mondlane; 17 January 1974 (age 52) Lichinga, Portuguese Mozambique
- Party: ANAMOLA
- Other political affiliations: See list: MDM (before 2018); RENAMO (2018–2024); CAD (2024)
- Education: Eduardo Mondlane University
- Occupation: Engineer, banker, politician

Venâncio António Bila Mondlane (born 17 January 1974) is a Mozambican politician and engineer. In the 2024 presidential election, Mondlane ran for President of Mozambique as supported by PODEMOS party.

Prior to his presidential run, he had served as a member of the Municipal Council of Maputo from 2014 to 2015, where he also served as the head of the Democratic Movement of Mozambique's (MDM) bench in Maputo's municipal council from 2014 to 2015. He resigned from the seat in 2015. Mondlane later attempted to run again for the Municipal Council in 2018, but his campaign was annulled by the National Election Commission (CNE). He was later an MP as a member of the primary opposition RENAMO party from 2020 to 2024. He ran for mayor of Maputo City as a member of MDM party in the 2013 local elections, and again in the 2023 elections as a member of RENAMO. He again served as a councilman in Maputo briefly in 2024, as his 2023 mayoral run yielded him a seat, but his mandate was revoked.

In the aftermath of the 2024 presidential election, Mondlane became a major opposition figure against FRELIMO and their newly-elected leader Daniel Chapo, with Mondlane having gained considerable popularity among young people in Mozambique. The election, which has been sharply criticised by Mondlane himself and various international and religious organisations for election irregularities and alterations of election results, has led to Mondlane making repeated calls for protests and marches against the FRELIMO-led government. The protests, which have included some instances of rioting, have been met with violence by state security forces in attempts to disperse the protests, leading to the deaths of at least 300 protestors as of January 2025, according to Sky News.

By November 2024, Mondlane was thought by Mozambican authorities to have gone into hiding in South Africa. This was later confirmed by Mondlane, with him later mentioning that he had left Africa entirely. He returned in January 2025. He briefly left the country again in March 2025 after security forces crashed an armored vehicle into the point car of his motorcade and fired live ammunition into his convoy as he was travelling to a protest, but has since returned to Mozambique.

== Early life and pre-political career ==
Mondlane was born on 17 January 1974 in Lichinga, Niassa Province, Mozambique. He earned a degree in forest engineering from Eduardo Mondlane University. Prior to his entry into politics, he led the "Jovens Solidários" movement in the Kambukwana district of Maputo from 1990 to 2000, which provided aid to victims of the 2000 Mozambique flood. He also cofounded Édipos and Oficina Artístico – Literária no Ateliê with musician Mikas. From 2000 to 2002, he worked at SGS S.A. to inspect products from forested regions in Mozambique, as well as other products, for their import and export at ports and airports. He later worked at Millennium bim as a senior economic and financial analyst.

He became known to a wider audience in Mozambique, beginning in 2003, for his appearances as a commentator on television and radio programmes, including for RDP África, Soico Televisão, and Televisão Miramar. He was also a columnist for publications such as the Association of Mozambican Writers (AEMO), his alma mater Eduardo Mondlane University, and the Fundo Bibliográfico de Língua Portuguesa, as well as in weekly newspapers such as Savana and Canal de Moçambique. In 2013, he was the lone representative from any member of the Community of Portuguese Language Countries (CPLP) to participate in the International Visitor Leadership Program (IVLP), an initiative hosted by the Bureau of Educational and Cultural Affairs of the United States Department of State.

== Political career ==
Mondlane began his career in politics with a run for mayor of Maputo in 2013 as a member of opposition party MDM, narrowly losing to FRELIMO candidate David Simango. He later would be elected as a member of the Municipal Assembly of Maputo in 2014, where he also served the head of the Democratic Movement of Mozambique's (MDM) bench in Maputo's municipal council from 2014 to 2015. He resigned from the seat in 2015.

Mondlane later attempted to run again for the Municipal Council in 2018 as part of RENAMO, but his campaign was annulled by the National Election Commission (CNE), as the MDM had considered his 2018 run illegal due to his resignation as a city councilor as a member of their party. RENAMO would later appeal the annulling of his campaign. Shortly before the annulment, Mondlane was the subject of a lawsuit by an unidentified person, claiming defamation and personal injury, which stemmed from a 2017 legal complaint Mondlane made about the purportedly illegal sale of a football field in Maputo for $3 million. He named three people that were alleged to have been involved in the scheme. Mondlane went on to posit that the move was politically motivated.

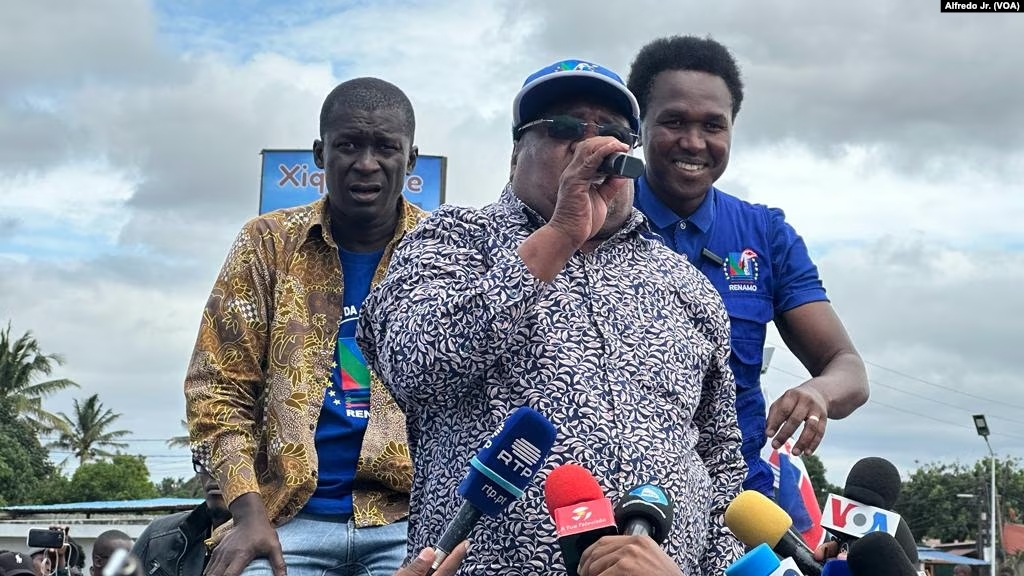
Mondlane (right), campaigning with Manuel de Araújo (left) and Ossufo Momade (centre) as part of RENAMO in 2023

Mondlane later became an MP in the Assembly of the Republic from 2020 to 2024. He both renounced his mandate as MP and left RENAMO on 3 June 2024 in order to run for the presidency that year.

Mondlane ran for mayor of Maputo in 2023 again as a member of RENAMO. He lost the 2023 election to Razaque Manhique, though the election was marred by allegations of fraud. He was the top of RENAMO's ticket in the municipal elections, and as such was elected again as a member of the municipal assembly. His mandate, however, was revoked, as it was alleged that he never officially took office and for "unjustified absences" from the assembly. Mondlane denounced the move as decisions made by a "fraudulent" assembly and that it was "meritorious" to have his mandate revoked. He later commented that he "had no fear and nothing to comment on an institution that is the product of the theft of the people's will."

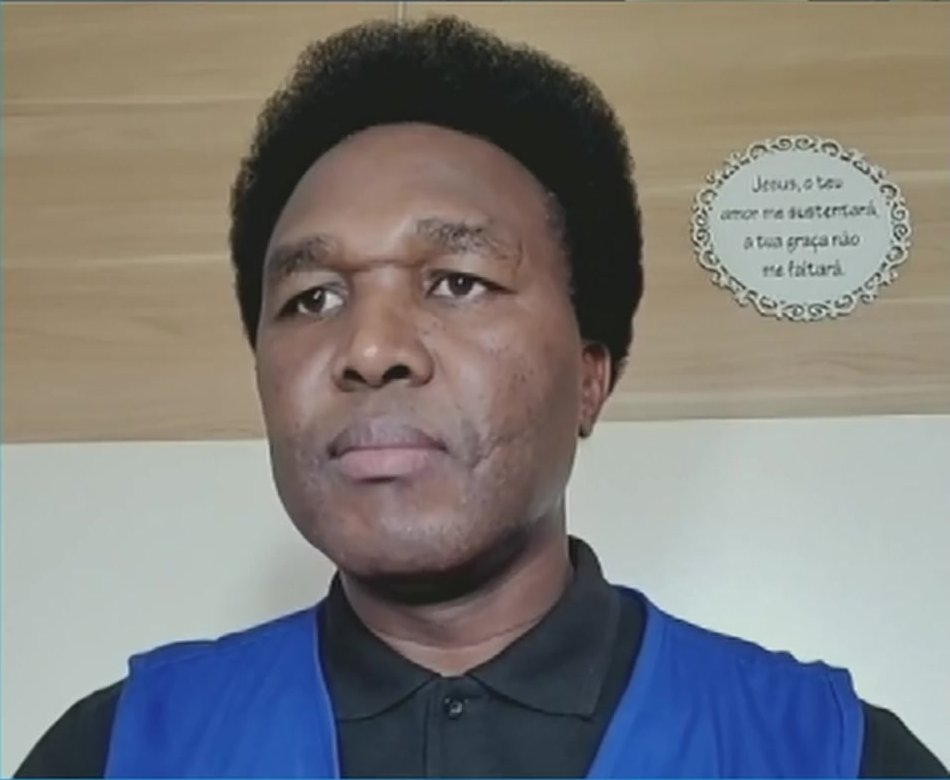
Mondlane while as a deputy in 2024

=== 2024 presidential run ===
In 2024, Mondlane initially announced his desire to run for president of Mozambique as the candidate for RENAMO. After RENAMO renominated Ossufo Momade as their presidential candidate, Mondlane later announced his intention to run as an independent in the October 2024 elections. He first affiliated himself with the Democratic Alliance Coalition (CAD) party, but the party was barred from running by the country's National Elections Commission and by the Constitutional Council, stating that they had failed to notify them of structural changes to the party. Mondlane heavily criticised the decision, asserting that the decision was the result of collaboration between the major parties and government institutions.

He later joined the Optimist Party for the Development of Mozambique (PODEMOS). He ran with the slogan "Save Mozambique - This Country is Ours". The current president of PODEMOS, Albino Forquilha, has also said that he would allow for the possibility of Mondlane becoming the party leader in the future.

Mondlane's platform included, among other proposals, reforming tax policies to channel revenues from multinational companies to foster local development, expanding financing options for young entrepreneurs, and to reform Mozambique's public health system. He also promised to negotiate with insurgent leaders in the northern Cabo Delgado Province, which has been the site of an Islamist insurgency since 2017, as well as to incentivise development in the province.

After the election on 9 October 2024, initial results released by the government showed ruling party FRELIMO in the lead, though with allegations of fraud from international observers.

== Events post-2024 election ==
=== October 2024 ===
While counting was underway on 11 October, Mondlane threatened to launch a nationwide strike on 21 October if FRELIMO declared victory. That same day, observers from the European Union and the European Parliament demanded that central election authorities release all voting details from all voting places. Despite having the data, the central election authorities have refused to do so. The EU observers later said that there had been "irregularities during counting and unjustified alteration of election results at polling station and district level". Mondlane later set the strike to begin on 21 October. On 16 October, four people were arrested during a march led by Mondlane in Nampula. Observers from the US-based International Republican Institute also noted instances of voter intimidation, vote-buying and inflated voter rolls in FRELIMO strongholds.

On 16 October the Attorney General of Mozambique summoned Mondlane for violating the Mozambican Constitution, arguing that Mondlane and his supporters performed "electoral offences, irregularities, common crimes and the violation[s] of ethical-electoral norms." Mondlane had claimed victory which the Attorney General classified as "incite[ing] violence, [and] public disorder". Mondlane is also publishing results from his parallel vote count which the attorney general classified as "behavior that violates ethical and electoral principles and norms."

On 17 October Angolan writer José Eduardo Agualusa criticized Mondlane for "an attitude of little democratic maturity" and that Mondlane was trying to "subvert the constitution." Agualusa also called on the ruling government to hold Mondlane "accountable for those statements" and that his strong performance, even though he did not win, was “the great revolution” of the current age and as such he needs to be more responsible. Agualusa also said that "Renamo, in fact, is the big loser in this process."

On 18 October, Elvino Dias, a lawyer working for PODEMOS and one of Mondlane's advisors, was shot dead in his car along with the party's spokesperson, Paulo Guambe, by unidentified attackers in Maputo. At the time of his death, Dias was preparing to submit a case to the constitutional court contesting the result. Mondlane accused the security forces of responsibility, while the EU, the African Union, the United States and Portugal condemned the killings. On 21 October, police fired tear gas at Mondlane while he was giving out interviews at the site of Dias and Guambe's murders. Mondlane said that police tried to prevent him from going outside to participate in protests. Protests also broke out in Maputo, Beira, Nampula and Gaza Province that same day as part of the strike called on by Mondlane, resulting in the arrest of six people and injuries to 16 people including two journalists.

After the elections and post-election violence began to escalate, Mondlane, who had been tear gassed by authorities while at protests on 21 October after the murders of Dias and Guambe, went into hiding. Mozambican authorities believe he fled to South Africa, from where he has continuously live-streamed to his supporters amidst internet blackouts and restrictions on social media access in Mozambique. He mentioned in a video on 4 November to have been in the city of Sandton, in the Johannesburg area.

Mondlane stated in a live-stream that the election results of 71% for Chapo were "totally absurd" and that "The revolution has arrived...the time has come." During these riots, Mozambican security forces killed at least 11 protesters and used live ammunition and tear gas to clear crowds. These moves were met with heavy criticism from Human Rights Watch. Additionally, another 50 were injured, and over 400 protesters were arrested in a two day period from 24 to 25 October.

On 27 October, PODEMOS formally filed an appeal with the Constitutional Council against the results. On 28 October Mondlane called for the formation of a rival "Government of National Unity" consisting of all opposition parties to form a united front against FRELIMO. All opposition parties except RENAMO joined this coalition, including New Democracy and MDM.

On 29 October, Mondlane called for a week-long strike, and for a 4-million strong march on Maputo on 7 November to overwhelm Mozambican authorities with protestors, as well as to "occupy" the presidential palace and other parts of Maputo.

=== November 2024 ===
On 4 November, Mondlane mentioned on a video posted to Facebook that he had been the target of an assassination attempt while in hiding in South Africa. On 7 November, Mondlane said that he had left Africa altogether. He has continued to state that protests would continue until the election results were overturned. Additionally, the MDM called for the recount of all votes or a repeat of the elections in order to restore “electoral justice.”

On 12 November, Mondlane called for a three-day nationwide protest "at the borders, at the ports and in the provincial capitals. All 11 provincial capitals" while also denouncing government claims that he was trying to stage a coup, saying "If we wanted to carry out a coup d’état, we would have done it." The Mozambican government has also filed a lawsuit against Mondlane for damages incurred during the protests valued at over 30 million meticais.

On 24 November the governments of the United States, Britain, Canada, Norway, and Switzerland on Wednesday jointly condemned the escalating violence against civilians in Mozambique and demanded an investigation into the deaths of 67 civilians. Human Rights Watch reported that at least 10 of the dead where children, and that the deteriorating security condition was preventing thousands of students from going to school. Mondlane's conditions for ending the protests were never met, and as such he boycotted a meeting with Chapo on 27 November and instead livestreamed to his supporters.

=== December 2024 ===
On 2 December, Mondlane called for the protests to continue for another "two to three months" so that "the country will become unfeasible [to govern]" with the death toll now reaching 67 and gave an interview to the BBC where he claimed to have spent some time during the earlier stages of the protests in hiding in South Africa due to credible threats to his life. Mondlane also stated that if FRELIMO doesn't cave to protesters that he will stand again in the 2029 Mozambican general election.

On 23 December, the Constitutional Court confirmed FRELIMO's victory in the election. Mondlane refused to recognise the decision and said that he would hold his inauguration as president on 15 January 2025.

=== January 2025 ===
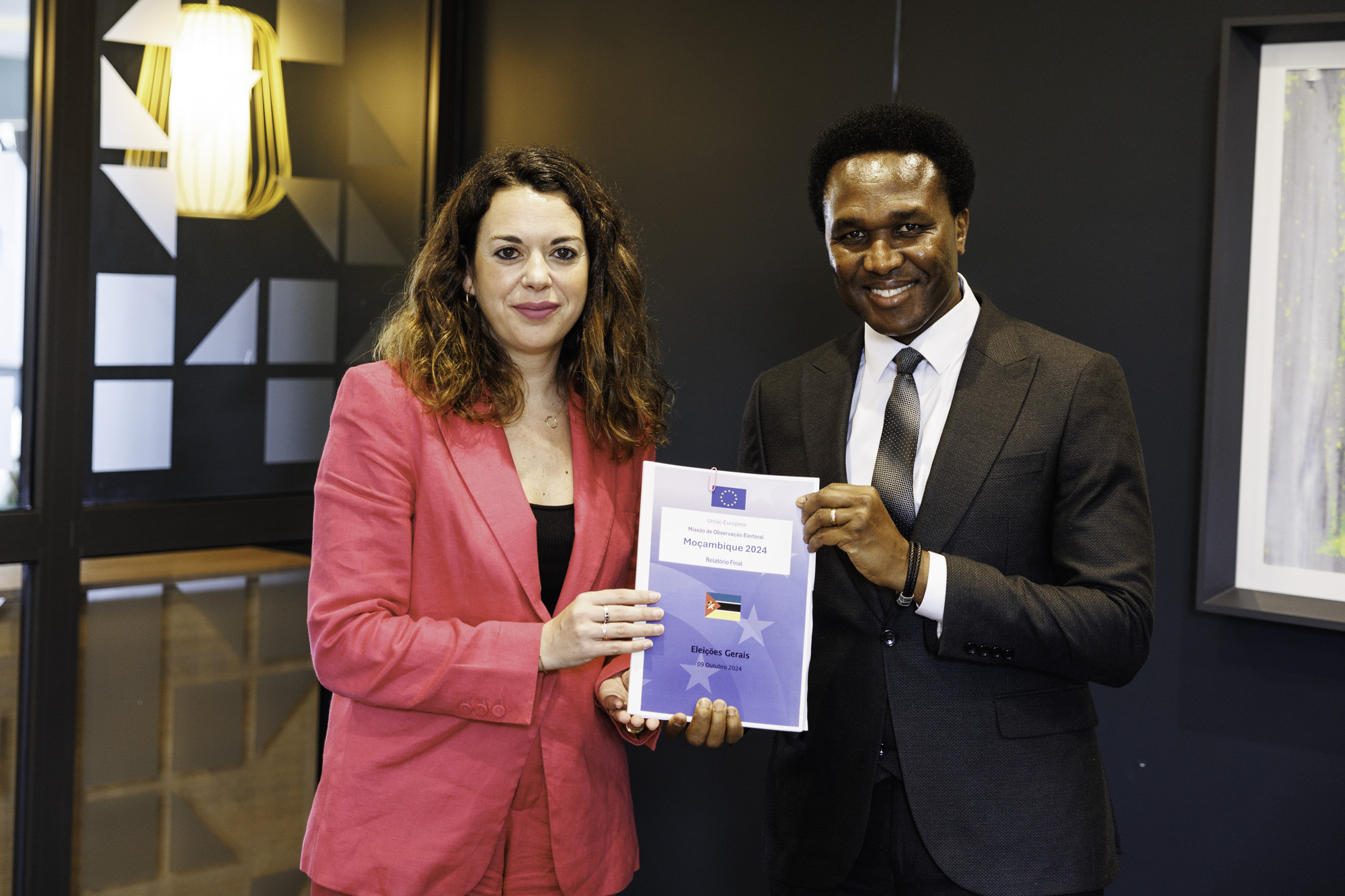
Mondlane with Spanish MEP Laura Ballarin Cereza in January 2025

Mondlane returned to Mozambique on 9 January. Security forces fired tear gas at hundreds of Mondlane supporters who gathered to welcome him near Maputo International Airport. During his arrival, Mondlane declared himself to be the president of Mozambique, starting his proclamation with: “I, Venâncio Mondlane, elected president by the Mozambican people,...” Following Chapo's inauguration, Mondlane said he would suspend protests for the first 100 days of Chapo's term and was open to serving in Chapo's government on condition that he release 5,000 people detained for participating in antigovernment protests, pay financial compensation to relatives of those killed by police during the protests and provide free medical treatment for about 200 people injured by police.

On January 24, Chapo would sack Bernadino Rafael, Mozambique's police chief, due to his heavy-handed approach to the protests which have led to the deaths of over 300. However, Chapo also denied claims from Mondlane that the government was kidnapping and disappearing pro-democracy opposition figures. Later that day Mondlane also made a statement that their fight was "far from over" and denied claims that he plans to join Chapo's government as a minister.

=== March 2025 ===
On March 5, Mozambican security forces attempted to disperse a rally held by Mondlane using live ammunition and crashing a police armored-car into the point car of Mondlane's convoy as he arrived, and opening fire into the convoy, injuring a member of his entourage and at least 16 protesters as well as killing 2 protesters. Afterwards Mondlane again fled the country for a few weeks before returning in late March. The police denied that the attack was an attempt to kill Mondlane but was instead a routine dispersal of protesters. Additionally, the Portuguese foreign ministry offered condolences to those killed at the rally. The protest had occurred outside of a meeting called by Chapo, attended by other members of the opposition, notably barring Mondlane.

On March 24 Mondlane announced he had met with Chapo and published a picture of them shaking hands, stating that FRELIMO had agreed to some concessions, namely releasing political prisoners, and compensating those injured and the families of protesters that were killed. Mozambican legal experts considered this dialogue as "breaking the ice" for future meetings, and as the beginning of the end of the protests.

== Post-protest activity ==
Mondlane, in June 2025, attempted to form his own political party: National Alliance for a Free and Autonomous Mozambique, or "ANAMALALA" whose acronym generated controversy as it means "it's over" or "it's finished" in the Macua language, with the Mozambican Ministry of Justice viewing the "it" as FRELIMO, and demanding Mondlane change the name. Mondlane refused, with the issue threatening to reopen protests. Eventually Justice Minister Mateus Saize backtracked, saying he never gave the order to change the name and that the Justice department had made no such decision.

== Views ==
Mondlane is an avowed populist, often using the slogan “Who runs this country? It is the people!" during campaign events. Mondlane has also interacted with the global anti-communist scene due to FRELIMO being a former Marxist-Leninist liberation party. Mondlane has voiced support for Jair Bolsonaro calling him “a man of God.” Mondlane's friend and Brazilian pastor Jonatas Feitosa stated that Mondlane views Bolsonaro “as a pioneering man.” Also, during his presidential campaign, Mondlane met with André Ventura the president of the Portuguese far-right party Chega. Ventura stated that he and Mondlane where working on creating a common platform of “combating corruption and crime, defending family and order, and addressing the collapse of justice and other institutions.”

However, he is not viewed as a right-wing politician by Mozambicans who instead support him for his broad pro-worker and pro-poor proposals of massive state intervention and the construction of three million homes in five years and financing businesses for youth and women.

== Personal life ==
In 2012, he became a Pentecostal Christian member of the Igreja Ministério Divina Esperança.
