= National Alliance for a Free and Autonomous Mozambique =

Political party in Mozambique

National Alliance for a Free and Autonomous Mozambique Aliança Nacional para um Moçambique Livre e Autónomo
- Abbreviation: ANAMOLA
- Leader: Venâncio Mondlane
- Founder: Venâncio Mondlane
- Founded: 3 April 2025
- Registered: 15 August 2025
- Split from: PODEMOS
- Ideology: Reformism; Populism
- Political position: Center to center-right
- Colours: Green; Black; Yellow; White
- Assembly of the Republic: 0 / 250

Party flag

Website
- anamola.co.mz

The National Alliance for a Free and Autonomous Mozambique (Portuguese: Aliança Nacional para um Moçambique Livre e Autónomo; ANAMOLA) is a political party in Mozambique. It was formed during the aftermath of the 2024–2025 Mozambican protests by opposition leader Venâncio Mondlane after the ruling FRELIMO party was alleged to have rigged the 2024 Mozambican general election.

== Background ==
Mozambique fought a protracted guerrilla war against the Portuguese for independence. The leading militant faction that fought in this war was the Mozambique Liberation Front (FRELIMO), a Marxist-Leninist group aligned with the Soviet Union which turned the country into a communist one-party state once in power. Shortly after the war for independence ended in September 1974, a civil war began in May 1977 led by the Mozambican National Resistance (RENAMO), a broad coalition of anti-communists, which lasted until 1992.

As part of the Rome General Peace Accords, which ended the civil war, FRELIMO agreed to legalize RENAMO and other political parties to hold free elections. However, it has routinely rigged these post-civil war elections in its favor, "winning" the 1994 election with 53% of the vote, the 1999 election with 52%, the 2004 election with 63%, the 2009 election with 75%, and the 2014 election with 57%. The last of these results caused RENAMO to restart its insurgency, arguing that the ceasefire was null and void if FRELIMO was going to rig every election to ensure that RENAMO remained out of power. This second civil war also ended in RENAMO's defeat in 2021 as FRELIMO went on to 'win' the 2019 election with 73% of the vote.

=== Venâncio Mondlane ===
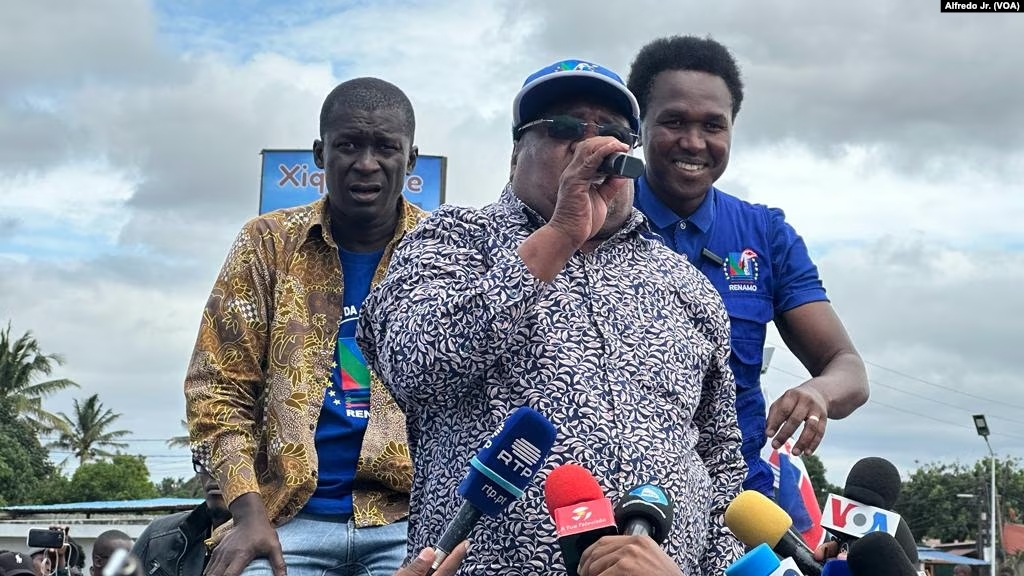
Venâncio Mondlane (right) during his time as a member of RENAMO, at a speaking event with party leader Ossufo Momade (center), and Manuel de Araújo (left).

Venâncio Mondlane, a journalist and engineer, started his political career as a member of the Democratic Movement of Mozambique (MDM), a group that splintered off from RENAMO and sought to focus on winning the elections, even if FRELIMO rigged them. Mondlane switched parties to RENAMO in the lead-up to the 2018 local elections. Although he was barred by the FRELIMO-dominated election board from standing for a seat, he went on to win a seat in the National Assembly in the 2019 election. Mondlane attempted to run for president under the RENAMO ticket; however, RENAMO instead nominated party leader and perennial presidential candidate Ossufo Momade. Mondlane then left RENAMO and joined the Optimist Party for the Development of Mozambique (PODEMOS), the largest opposition party, which had split off from FRELIMO to advocate for democratic socialism instead of the more communist thought that dominates FRELIMO.

The 2024 election would, again, be mired by FRELIMO voter fraud, with Mondlane coming in an official second place. Mondlane called for a general strike and protests against the 'official' election results, and demanded FRELIMO release tabulated election results by district, which they refused. Massive protests peaking at 1.5 million protesters rocked the nation in support of Mondlane, calling for an end to FRELIMO rule and the release of election results. However, FRELIMO refused to budge, swearing in its designated winner, Daniel Chapo, as president and cracking down on the protests with deadly force that left about 400 people dead. Mondlane eventually ordered the end of the protests once general amnesty was offered to the protesters on 24 March 2025, but vowed to continue to fight FRELIMO, and to stand again in the 2029 elections.

== History ==
Mondlane announced his intention to found his own party, the National Alliance for a Free and Autonomous Mozambique, on 3 April 2025, due to his ideological differences with PODEMOS and a falling out with its leader. The acronym ANAMALALA means "it's over" in the Macua language. The Ministry of Justice took offense to this acronym, viewing it as an attack on FRELIMO, and demanded that Mondlane change his party's name. Otherwise, the ministry threatened to refuse registration, which risked restarting the protests that had just ended. The threat of further protests caused the Justice Minister, Mateus Saize, to backtrack, stating that the Ministry had never issued an order for the name change, despite Mondlane providing a photocopy proving otherwise. The Ministry of Justice would formally register the party on 15 August 2025, with a new name, ANAMOLA. The party would hold a formal foundation rally on 22 September 2025 in Beira.

The party has vowed that if it is elected into office, it will change the Constitution of Mozambique to dismantle the effective one-party rule of FRELIMO and allow free and fair elections. To this end it opened public consultations to see what the public would want in a new constitution. One of the key points they proposed would be gutting the central election commission, and implementing a new rule stating that members of the commission must not be affiliated with any political party. Members of the commission, tasked with not only approving candidates, but also counting votes and verifying results, are primarily members of FRELIMO, but the MDM and RENAMO are also members of the commission, allowing FRELIMO to easily tamper with or otherwise influence elections. ANAMOLA proposed replacing the political appointment process with elections by a 2/3rd majority from the assembly, and that only political independents be allowed to hold seats on the commission.

On 16 May 2026, Pedro João Chaúque, an ANAMOLA member, was killed by a group of unknown men at his home in Gaza Province. The killing followed the death of ANAMOLA's coordinator, Anselmo Vicente, by unknown armed men on 9 May in Chimoio, Manica Province.
