= 2024 Mozambican general election =

- 9 October 2024
- Presidential election
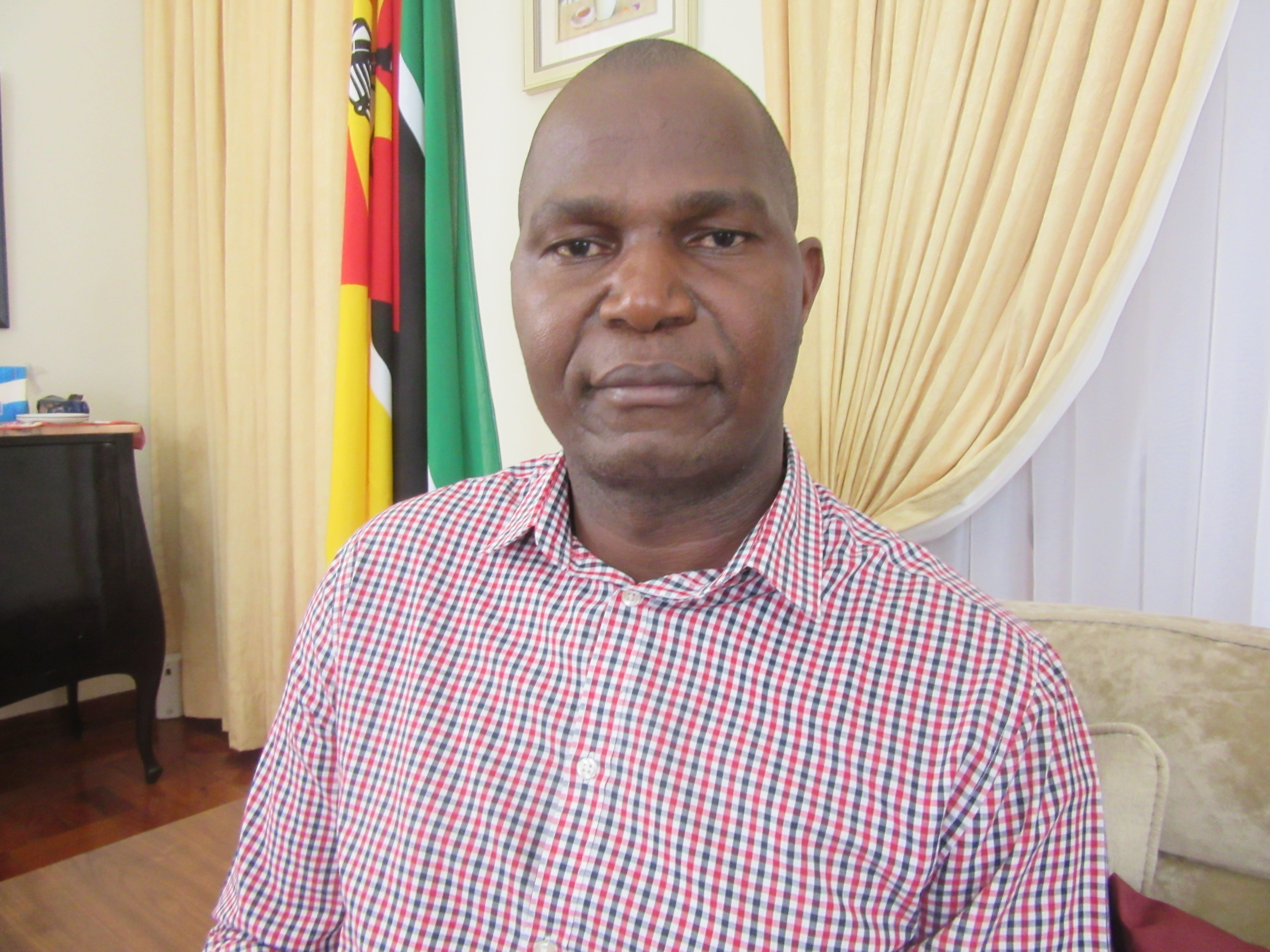

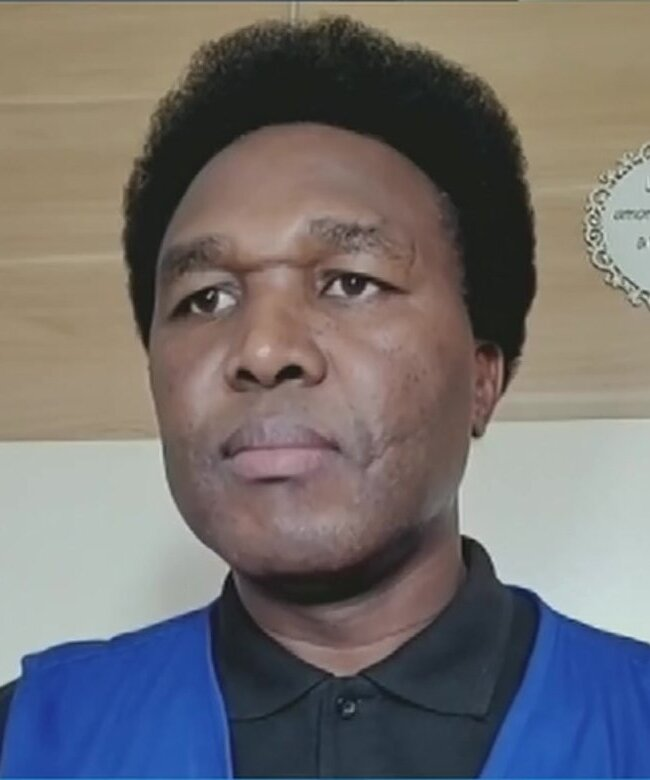

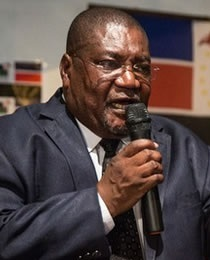
Nominee	Daniel Chapo	Venâncio Mondlane	Ossufo Momade
Party	FRELIMO	PODEMOS	RENAMO
Popular vote	4,416,306	1,639,333	448,738
Percentage	65.17%	24.19%	6.62%
President before election
Filipe Nyusi
FRELIMO
Elected President
Daniel Chapo
FRELIMO
- Parliamentary election
- All 250 seats in the Assembly of the Republic; 126 seats needed for a majority
Party	Leader	Vote %	Seats	+/–
FRELIMO	Filipe Nyusi	71.43	171	−13
PODEMOS	Albino Forquilha	12.94	43	New
RENAMO	Ossufo Momade	8.11	28	−32
MDM	Lutero Simango	3.50	8	+2
This lists parties that won seats. See the complete results below.

General elections were held in Mozambique on 9 October 2024 to elect the president, the 250 members of the Assembly of the Republic and members of the ten provincial assemblies.

The ruling FRELIMO party, which has increasingly become marked with growing concerns of authoritarianism and impunity amid the controversies surrounding the 2023 local elections and the 2019 general election, was declared the winner of the election, with its leader, Daniel Chapo, proclaimed as president-elect. This was disputed by Venâncio Mondlane, with his party PODEMOS claiming Mondlane had received 53% of the vote using data from their poll observers. The result was also questioned by the Episcopal Conference of Mozambique and the European Union, while deadly protests broke out over the election results, with at least 400 deaths, mostly demonstrators being killed by police and army forces.

== Background ==
FRELIMO, which has ruled the country since 1975 when they created a one-party Marxist–Leninist state, allowed multi-party elections as part of the peace process that ended the Mozambican Civil War in 1994; however, the opposition has decried these elections as rigged in FRELIMO's favor. After the 2023 local elections protests broke out due to alleged fraud on the part of FRELIMO with the police killing at least three protesters. Public perceptions of the election were muted, as many view a FRELIMO victory as a foregone conclusion.

== Electoral system ==
The president is elected using the two-round system. The 250 members of the Assembly of the Republic are elected by proportional representation in eleven multi-member constituencies based on the country's provinces and on a first-past-the-post basis from two single-member constituencies representing Mozambican citizens in Africa and Europe. Seats in the multi-member constituencies are allocated using the d'Hondt method, with an electoral threshold of 5%. Official results are announced by the National Election Commission (CNE) after 15 days and must subsequently be validated by the Constitutional Council.

Concerns have been raised over discrepancies in the total number of registered voters, which stands at more than 17 million. The non-governmental organisation Centro de Integridade Pública, citing data published by the CNE, said that there are 878,868 more registered voters than there are voting age adults in some provinces, leading them to describe 5% of the electorate as "ghost voters". The International Institute for Democracy and Electoral Assistance also notes the existence of "ghost voters" in seven of the country's ten provinces, with up to a third of the registered voting population in Gaza Province believed to be non-existent.

== Candidates ==
Amélia Muendane, Luísa Diogo, Jaime Basílio Monteiro, José Pacheco, Celso Correia, and Samora Machel junior. On 5 May 2024, after a meeting of its Central Committee, FRELIMO named Daniel Chapo, a 47-year old law professor and former governor of Inhambane Province, as its candidate in the upcoming election to succeed outgoing president Filipe Nyusi. Chapo is the first presidential candidate of FRELIMO who was born after Mozambique gained independence in 1975.

On the same date, the Democratic Movement of Mozambique (MDM) selected its leader, Lutero Simango, to be its candidate for the October elections.

Other candidates include Ossufo Momade, the leader of the RENAMO party since 2018 who had lost in the 2019 presidential election to Nyusi, and Venâncio Mondlane, a banker and forestry engineer who ran as an independent after breaking away from RENAMO following an unsuccessful bid in the mayoral election in Maputo in 2023 that was marred by allegations of electoral fraud. Mondlane was supported by the newly established Optimist Party for the Development of Mozambique (PODEMOS), as well as the Democratic Alliance, a coalition of opposition parties that were barred from contesting the election. Mondlane was registered as the PODEMOS party's presidential candidate for this election. Also, the president of the PODEMOS party, Albino Forquilha, said that he allows for the possibility of Mondlane becoming the party leader in the future.

== Campaign ==
Campaigning was held from August to 6 October. Both Chapo and Mondlane also made campaign stops in neighbouring South Africa, appealing to overseas voters there. All three candidates named the resolution of the Insurgency in Cabo Delgado as their main priority. Chapo was seen as the favorite to win the election. Independent candidate Venâncio Mondlane was seen as the biggest challenge to Chapo.

== Conduct ==
The Southern African Development Community sent 52 election observers to monitor the election. Observers were also deployed by the African Union and the European Union. However, more than 200 polling stations denied journalists and observers access to the vote counting process with the election watchdog group Sala da Paz stating: "There were significant cases of .... electoral irregularities that may raise questions about the credibility of the process."

Polling opened at 07:00 and closed at 18:00. Chapo's rivals alleged instances of fraud such as ballot boxes being unsealed before voting ended and some of their representatives being denied accreditation to monitor the vote.

== Results ==
Opposition candidate Venâncio Mondlane preemptively declared himself victor.

By 16 October preliminary reports showed Chapo in the lead. On 24 October, the CNE announced that Chapo won the election with 71% of the vote, while turnout was at 43%. It also said that FRELIMO won in all provincial elections and won 195 of the 250 seats in parliament, with PODEMOS winning 31 seats and RENAMO winning 20. PODEMOS disputed the results, publishing their own parallel count from their election monitors which showed Mondlane won with 53% of the vote and the party won 138 seats. PODEMOS provided over 660 pounds of tabulated ballots to support their election count. On 23 December, the Constitutional Council published and validated the election results, which were different from the preliminary outcome announced by the CNE.

=== President ===
Candidate	Party	Votes	%
Daniel Chapo	FRELIMO	4,416,306	65.17
Venâncio Mondlane	PODEMOS	1,639,333	24.19
Ossufo Momade	RENAMO	448,738	6.62
Lutero Simango	MDM	272,736	4.02
Total		6,777,113	100.00
Valid votes		6,777,113	93.63
Invalid votes		205,601	2.84
Blank votes		255,313	3.53
Total votes		7,238,027	100.00
Registered voters/turnout		17,169,239	42.16
Source: Conselho Constitucional

=== Assembly ===
Party	Votes	%	Seats	+/–
FRELIMO	4,910,858	71.43	171	−13
PODEMOS	889,788	12.94	43	New
RENAMO	557,724	8.11	28	−32
Democratic Movement of Mozambique	240,409	3.50	8	+2
Party of Greens of Mozambique	59,041	0.86	0	0
National Reconciliation Party	18,012	0.26	0	0
New Democracy	15,723	0.23	0	0
Democratic Revolution Party	15,712	0.23	0	0
Youth Movement for the Restoration of Democracy	14,864	0.22	0	0
Ecological Party–Land Movement	14,759	0.21	0	0
National Unity Party	14,432	0.21	0	0
Patriotic Movement for Democracy	14,360	0.21	0	0
Mozambican National Union	13,967	0.20	0	0
Social Renewal Party	12,012	0.17	0	0
Labour Party	10,656	0.15	0	0
Democratic Liberal Party of Mozambique	8,386	0.12	0	0
Humanitarian Party of Mozambique	8,376	0.12	0	0
Union for Change Party	7,321	0.11	0	0
Reconciliation Party of Mozambique	6,516	0.09	0	0
Ecological Party of Mozambique	6,328	0.09	0	0
United Development Action Party for Integral Salvation	5,676	0.08	0	0
National Movement for the Recovery of Mozambican Unity	4,883	0.07	0	0
Party of Freedom and Development	4,561	0.07	0	0
National Workers and Peasants Party	3,195	0.05	0	0
Reconciliation Movement of Mozambique	2,536	0.04	0	0
Democratic Justice Party of Mozambique	2,433	0.04	0	0
Party for the Progress of the People of Mozambique	2,227	0.03	0	0
Social Broadening Party of Mozambique	2,071	0.03	0	0
Mozambican National Party/CRD	1,819	0.03	0	0
Party for the Development of Mozambique	1,663	0.02	0	0
Party for Peace, Democracy, and Development	1,241	0.02	0	0
Union of Mozambican Democrats	1,192	0.02	0	0
United Democrats Congress	1,060	0.02	0	0
Party of Social Democratic Reconciliation	774	0.01	0	0
People's Democratic Party of Mozambique	619	0.01	0	0
Total	6,875,194	100.00	250	0
Valid votes	6,875,194	91.24		
Invalid votes	277,365	3.68		
Blank votes	382,785	5.08		
Total votes	7,535,344	100.00		
Registered voters/turnout	17,169,239	43.89		
Source: CNE & STAE (Resultados preliminares)

=== Provincial elections ===
Province	Seats		
Province	FRELIMO	RENAMO	MDM
Cabo Delgado Province			
Gaza Province			
Inhambane Province			
Manica Province			
Maputo Province			
Nampula Province			
Niassa Province			
Sofala Province			
Tete Province			
Zambezia Province			
Total			

== Reactions ==
- China: Foreign ministry spokesmen Lin Jian congratulated "the Frelimo party and Chapo on their election victory" on 26 October and called for a continuation of strong Chinese-Mozambican ties.
- South Africa: President Cyril Ramaphosa announced on 27 October that he welcomes the election results and congratulated "President-Elect Daniel Chapo and his party, FRELIMO" while also calling for calm and denouncing violence. After violence broke out related to the election, foreign minister Ronald Lamola expressed concern and called for calm.
