= Mário Albino =

Mozambican politician

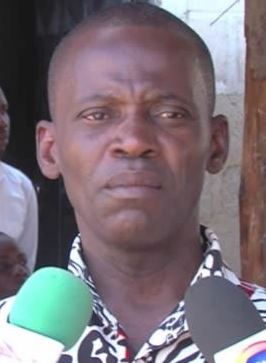
Albino in 2019

Mário Albino is a Mozambican politician who ran for mayor of Nampula in 2018 and for president in 2019.

== Political career ==
Albino is the leader of the United Movement for Action and Integral Salvation (AMUSI), a political party that split off from Democratic Movement of Mozambique in the mid 2010s, the latter which itself is a split off from Mozambique's main opposition party RENAMO.

In January 2018 Albino announced that he would be campaigning to contest the mayoral election in Nampula, after the former mayor was murdered. Albino ran for mayor of the city, but only received 4.2% of the vote.

=== 2019 Presidential election ===
On 31 July Mozambique's Constitutional Council approved Albino along with Filipe Nyusi, Ossufo Momade, and Daviz Simango as candidates in the 2019 presidential election. Two candidates were disqualified; Hélder Mendoça and Alice Mabota. If she had been allowed to run, Mabota would have become the first woman to run for president in the country, but according to the constitutional council she did not obtain the required number of signatures. Albino was the only candidate from a non-traditional party to receive the necessary 10,000 signatures required to run for president.

In June 2019, AMUSI party chairman Hermínio Sumail released a statement saying that Albino and his campaign were not being treated fairly by the ruling party or the opposition. In September 2019 Albino claimed that the AMUSI headquarters in the Namutequeliua neighborhood of Nampula were attacked by members of RENAMO who fled after the staff called the police. He also claimed that the Mozambique civil service were spying on him and his campaign team. Albino also claimed that he had received death threats.
