= Simango =

Simango is the surname of the following persons:

- Uria Simango (born 15 March 1926), Mozambican Presbyterian minister and prominent leader of the Mozambique Liberation Movement Frelimo
- Daviz Simango (1964–2021), Mozambican politician and President of the Democratic Movement of Mozambique (MDM), son of Uria Simango
- David Simango, mayor of the town of Maputo in Mozambique
- Lutero Simango, Mozambican politician and presidential candidate
