= Daniel Chapo =

President of Mozambique since 2025

His Excellency Daniel Chapo
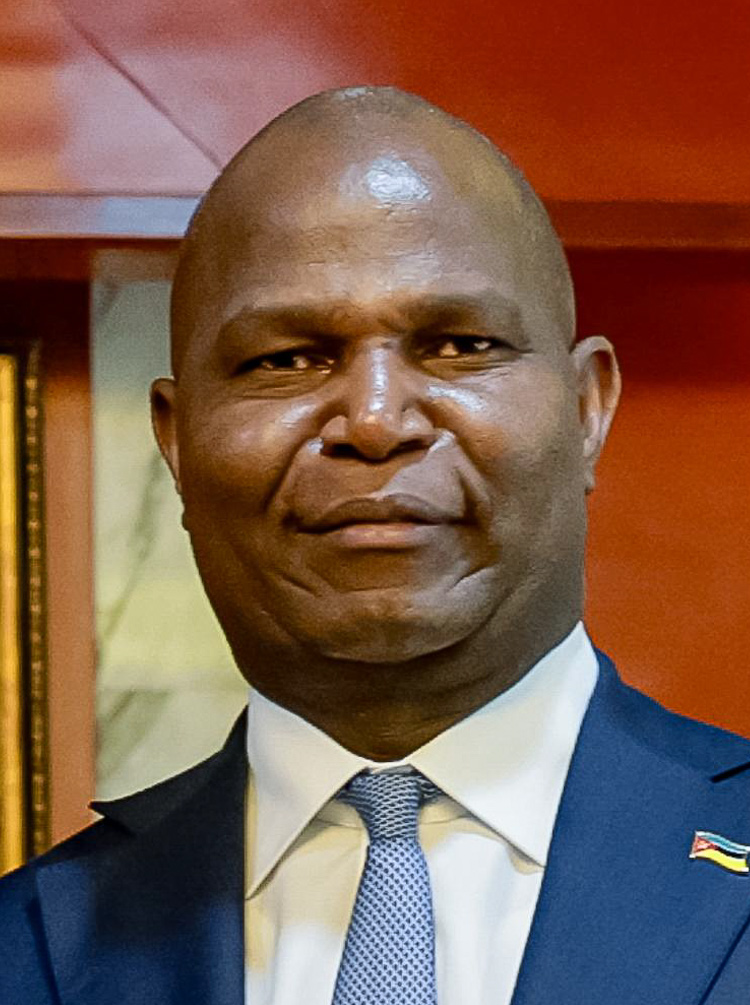
- Chapo in 2025

5th President of Mozambique
- Incumbent
- Assumed office 15 January 2025
- Prime Minister: Maria Benvinda Levy
- Preceded by: Filipe Nyusi

Governor of Inhambane Province
- In office 4 March 2016 – 23 May 2024
- Preceded by: Agostinho Trinta
- Succeeded by: Eduardo Mussanhane

Personal details
- Born: 6 January 1977 (age 49) Inhaminga, Sofala Province, Mozambique
- Party: FRELIMO
- Spouse: Gueta Selemane Chapo (m. 2009)
- Children: 4
- Education: Eduardo Mondlane University; Catholic University of Mozambique

Daniel Francisco Chapo (born 6 January 1977) is a Mozambican politician, lawyer and jurist who has been the president of Mozambique since 15 January 2025. Chapo previously served as the governor of Inhambane Province from 2016 to 2024. Chapo was the Secretary-General and candidate of the ruling political party, FRELIMO, for the 2024 presidential election.

== Early life and education ==
Chapo was born on 6 January 1977 in Inhaminga, Sofala Province, Mozambique. He had his primary school education in Inhaminga from 1982 to 1985, then in Dondo District from 1986 to 1987, and had secondary education in Dondo District from 1988 to 1996, then at Escola Secundária Samora Machel in Beira from 1997 to 1998. He attended Eduardo Mondlane University in Maputo and studied law, graduating with a degree in 2000. Chapo became a notary public in 2004. He later received a master's degree in development management from the Catholic University of Mozambique in 2014.

Chapo worked as an announcer for Rádio Miramar in Beira from 1997 to 1998 and later was a news presenter for Televisão Miramar in the capital from 2003 to 2004. He was appointed conservator of Nacala-Porto in 2005. He interned for a bar association from 2007 to 2008 and also taught political science and constitutional law at Maputo Pedagogical University in 2009.

== Political career ==
Chapo entered politics with the party FRELIMO in 2009, being appointed administrator of the Nacala-a-Velha District. He later became administrator of the Palma District in 2015.

=== Governor of Inhambane ===
Chapo was appointed the governor of Inhambane Province on 4 March 2016. Three years later, he was elected to the position during the general elections in October 2019.

On 5 May 2024, Chapo was announced as the FRELIMO candidate for the 2024 presidential election, to replace the term-limited Filipe Nyusi, with 225 votes (94%) by the party committee. Considered relatively unknown, his nomination was seen as a surprise. On 13 May, he was appointed the party's interim secretary-general. He later announced his resignation as governor of Inhambane Province, which was approved by the legislature on 23 May, to focus on the election on 9 October. He would be succeeded as governor of Inhambane province by Eduardo Mussanhane, the Speaker of the Inhambane Provincial Assembly.

=== Presidential candidate ===
Chapo is the first FRELIMO presidential candidate to have been born after the country's independence from Portugal in 1975. Due to the dominance of FRELIMO in Mozambican politics, Chapo was viewed as the favorite to win the election. On 24 October, Mozambique's electoral commission announced that Chapo won the election with 71% of the vote —‌however, the election was marred by allegations of widespread fraud and irregularities. The opposition PODEMOS party disputed the results, publishing their own parallel count from their election monitors which showed Venâncio Mondlane won with 53% of the vote. PODEMOS provided over 660 pounds of tabulated ballots to support their election count. The result was also questioned by the Episcopal Conference of Mozambique and the European Union, while deadly protests broke out over the election results, with at least 250 deaths, mostly demonstrators being killed by police and army forces.

== Presidency ==
Chapo and his wife, Gueta Selemane Chapo, with Russian President Vladimir Putin at the 2026 Russia–Africa Summit in Moscow, 28 October 2026

Despite protests, Chapo was inaugurated as president on 15 January 2025. On 18 January 2025 Chapo named Maria Benvinda Levy as Prime Minister.

== Personal life ==
Chapo is married to Gueta Selemane Chapo and has four children. He is a Christian.

Political offices
Preceded by Filipe Nyusi	President of Mozambique; 2025–present	Incumbent
