= Mércia Viriato Licá =

Mozambican lawyer and politician

Mércia Viriato Licá MP

Member of the Assembly of the Republic
- Incumbent
- Assumed office 13 January 2020
- Constituency: Tete Province

Personal details
- Born: Mércia Viriato Licá; January 15, 1997 (age 29) Massinga, Mozambique
- Party: FRELIMO
- Education: Maputo Pedagogical University (LLB)
- Occupation: Member of Parliament
- Profession: Lawyer; Politician

Mércia Viriato Licá (born 1996/1997) is a Mozambican lawyer and politician who has been serving as a Member of the Assembly of the Republic since 13 January 2020. When she took office, she became the youngest MP in the country's history. She is a member of the ruling FRELIMO party.

== Biography ==
Mércia Viriato Licá was born without any upper limbs. Her father abandoned her when she was still young and her mother consequently raised her. In 2019, she obtained a law degree from the Maputo Pedagogical University.

She met President Filipe Nyusi through Facebook and he visited her family home in 2018. She lives with her mother and she performs routine tasks using her feet. In October 2019, she was elected an MP in the general election. She assumed the post in January 2020 and represents the Tete Province.
