= Beatriz Buchili =

Mozambican lawyer

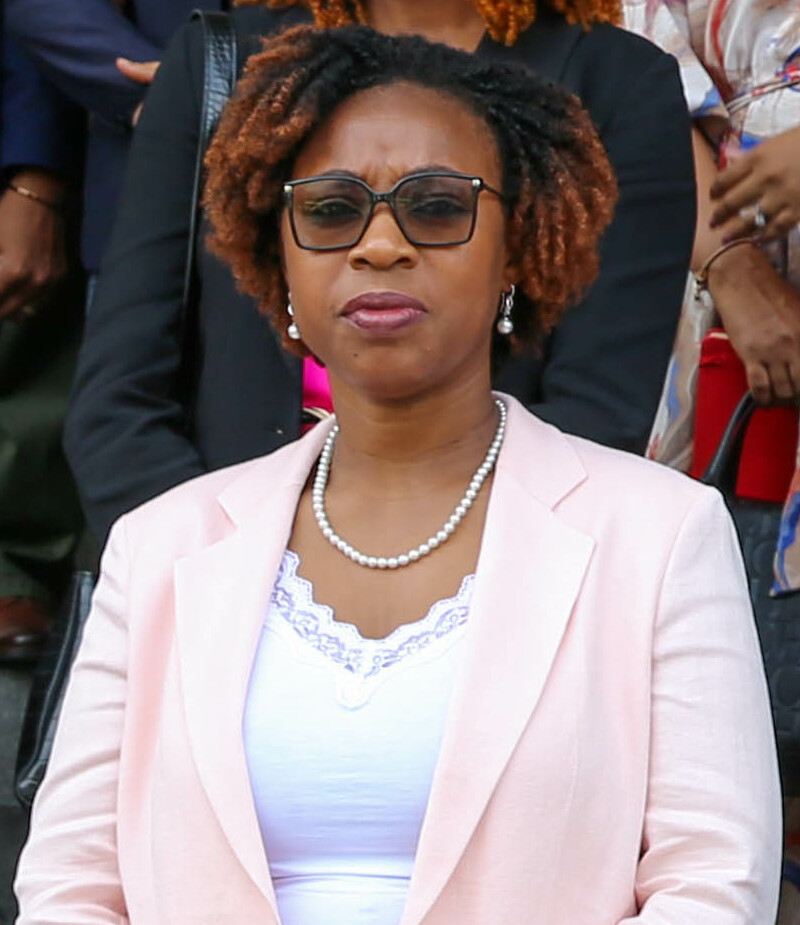
Buchili in 2023

Beatriz da Consolação Mateus Buchili is a Mozambican lawyer. She is the first woman to be Attorney General of Mozambique.

== Life ==
Beatriz Buchili has a master’s degree in law from the Federal University of Rio Grande do Sul in Brazil. She joined the Public Prosecutor’s Office in 1994 as a district attorney, and rose to become a deputy to the Attorney General, Augusto Paulino.

President Armando Guebuza appointed Buchili to succeed Paulino as Attorney General on 21 July 2014. She has presided over several high-profile corruption cases. One case involves twenty indicted defendants, including Gregorio Leão, former director general of the secret services (SISE); SISE director of economic intelligence António do Rosário; Inês Moiane, private secretary to the former president Armando Guebuza; and the former president's son Armando Ndambi Guebuza. Two other corruption cases are the Embraer case, related to the purchase of aircraft for the LAM Mozambique Airlines, and the Odebrecht case, relating to the construction of Nacala International Airport and the coal terminal at the Port of Beira.

In August 2019 President Filipe Nyusi swore Buchili in for a second five-year term as Attorney General.
