= Alice Mabota =

Mozambican human rights activist (1949–2023)

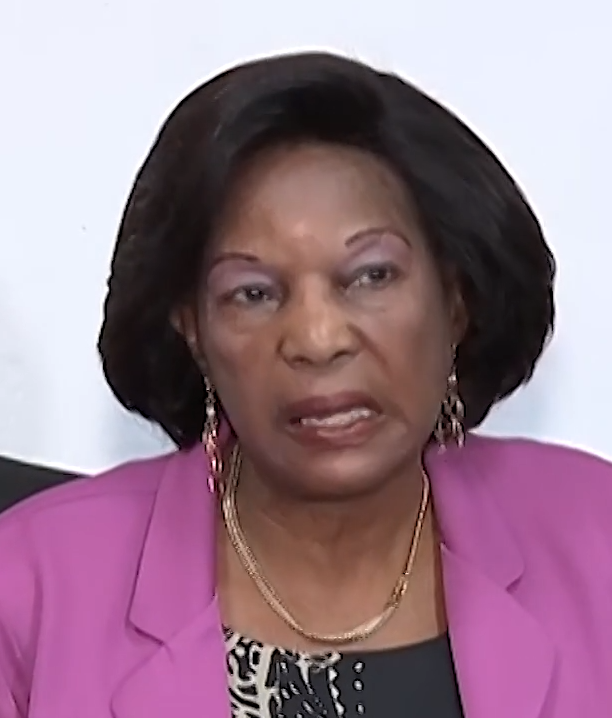
- Born: 8 April 1949; Lourenço Marques, Portuguese Mozambique
- Died: 12 October 2023 (aged 74); South Africa
- Occupation: Human rights activist

Maria Alice Mabota (Note: Also spelled as Mavota or Mahota, depending on the transcription.) (8 April 1949 – 12 October 2023) was a Mozambican human rights activist and president of the Mozambique Human Rights League.

== Life ==
=== Youth ===
Maria Alice Mabota was born in 1949 in the Missão José mission, current Hospital Geral José Macamo, in Lourenço Marques. Typically, families with so-called "indigenous" status - as was the family of Mabota - did not register children immediately at birth. For this reason, her age was estimated in comparison of physiognomy with other children.

Mabota occasionally lived with her father in Machava 15. The first elementary school attended by Mabota at the Missão de São Roque Mission Station in Matutuíne, about 100 kilometers from the capital. However, as usual for Mozambicans with "indigenous" status, they were only able to complete elementary school there. At times, she also lived with her uncle on the opposite side of the capital, in Catembe. There Mabota was also baptized in 1966.

=== Further education ===
In 1967/68, Mabota's mother came from the South African underground, where she had reportedly worked for the Mozambican FRELIMO Liberation Front. Mabota's mother insisted that her daughter continued to pursue her education. Then she went to the secondary school in the evening and worked during the day as a cleaner in various institutions.

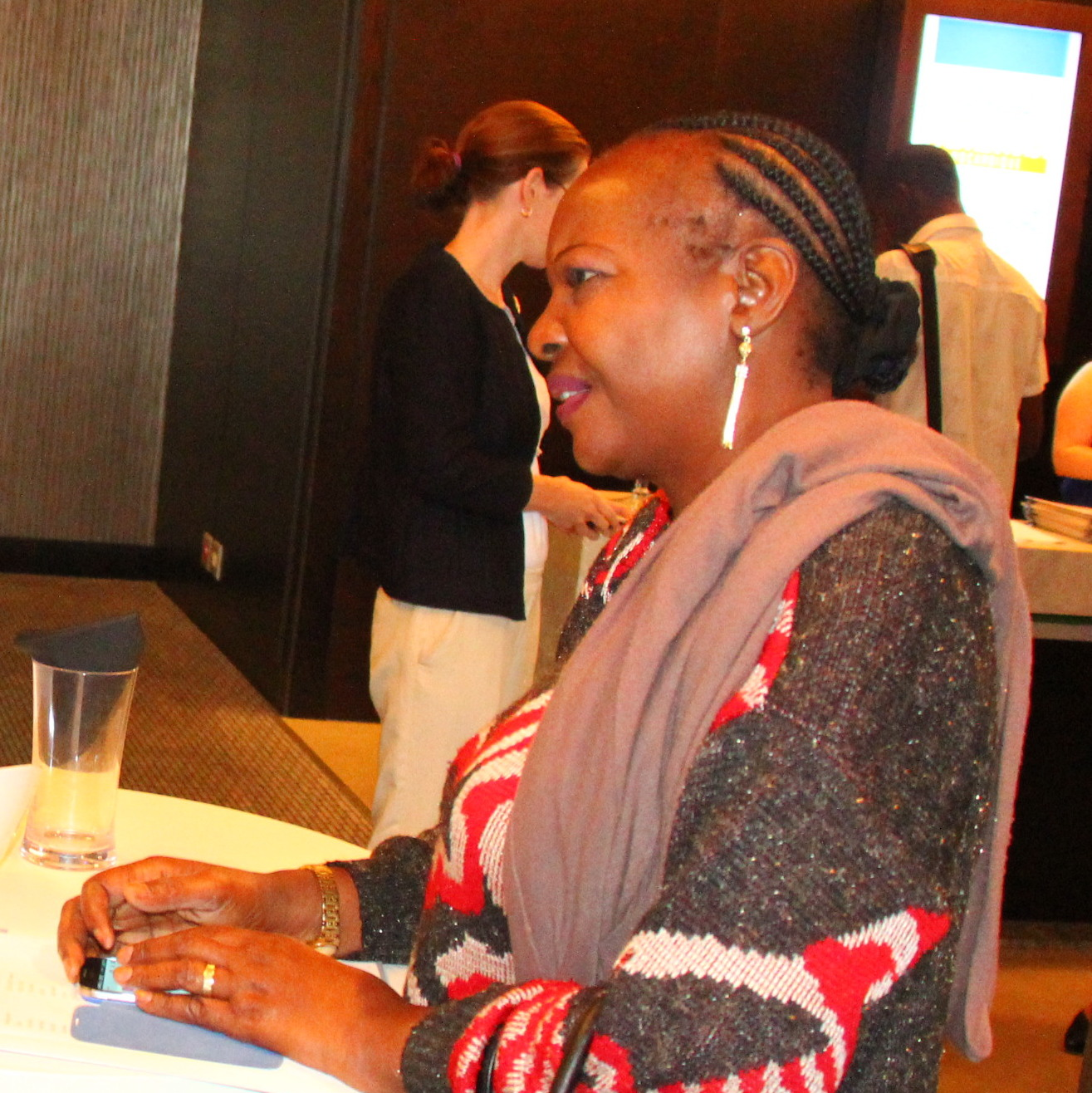
Alice Mabota

In 1973 she began working at the Instituto de Investigação Agronómica of the Colonial Agricultural Authority (the later Ministry of Agriculture), but left this work in 1980 due to personal differences. She rejected a job offer of the Mozambican secret service Serviços de Informação e Segurança do Estado (SISE).

Mabota finished her seventh grade at the Francisco Manyanga secondary school, her ninth grade at the Josina Machel secondary school in central Maputo. As a result, she obtained her access to a higher education, but could not bring herself to study medicine - since she did not want to see any corpses, according to her own statement - nor international relations, - since she could not speak English or French. She then gave Portuguese lessons at the secondary school Francisco Manyanga for the time being, when David Simango was head of the school. Later, she worked at the Patrocínio e Assistência Jurídica (IPAJ) and at the state realty administration Administração do Parque Imobiliário do Estado (APIE).

=== Founding of the Human Rights League ===
A major change in Mabota's life was in 1993 when she attended a Vienna Conference on Human Rights, where she stayed for 45 days. This motivated her to be very committed to human rights in Mozambique. Back in Vienna in 1995, together with other Mozambican activists and intellectuals, she founded the Liga dos Direitos Humanos de Moçambique, in English "Human Rights League", based on the Guinea-Bissau model.

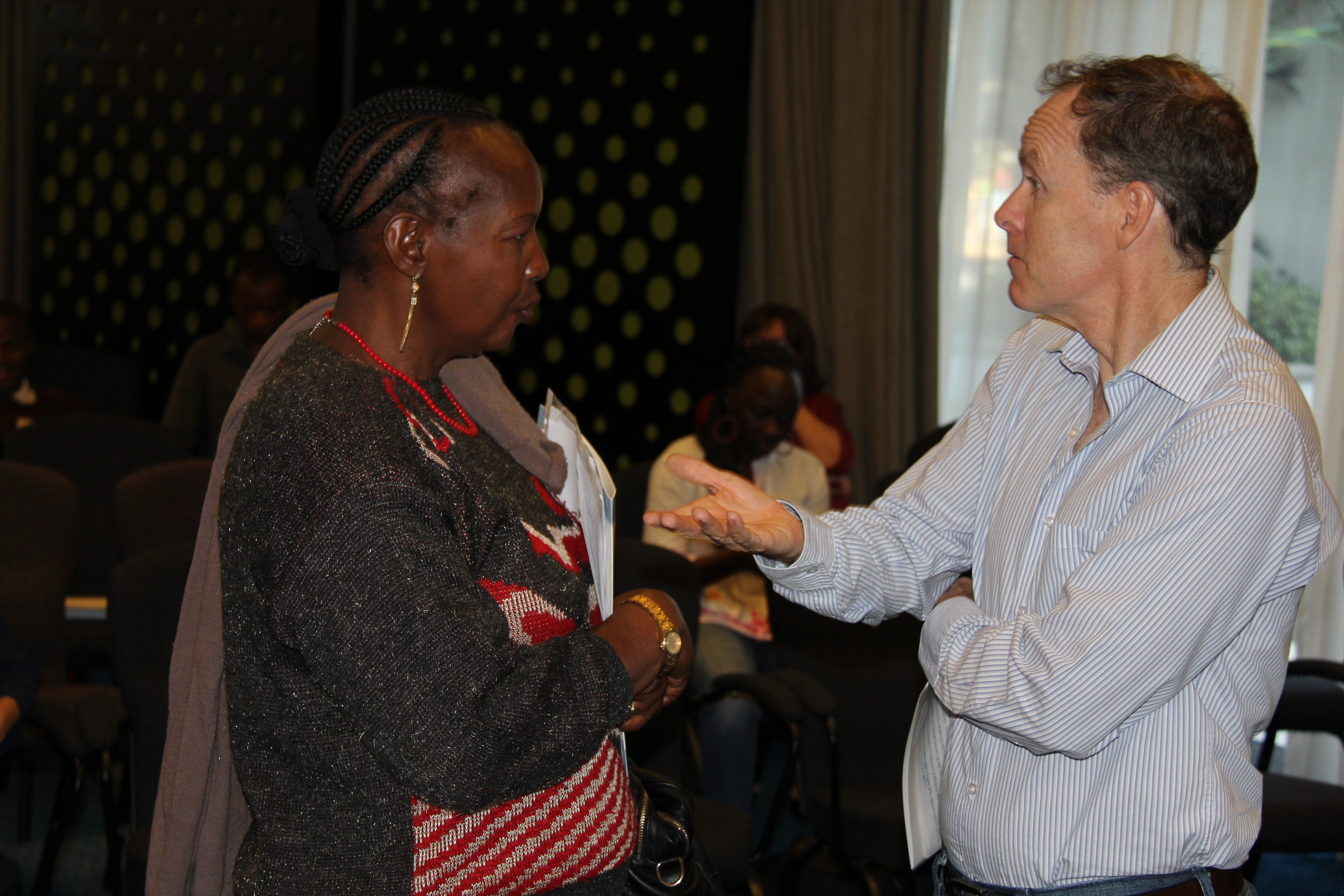
Alice Mabota talking with Douglas Griffiths, US ambassador to Mozambique from 2012 to 2016.

Since then Alice Mabota has chaired the Human Rights League and has established herself as one of Mozambique's civil society's most popular voices. Especially in the 2010s, she criticized the increasing polarization of Mozambican politics between FRELIMO and RENAMO. The Human Rights League, along with other organizations of Mozambican civil society, organized several protest marches for peace, equality and against corruption in the Mozambican capital. In the course of this, she received numerous death threats and also public insults, which are attributed to the radical FRELIMO wing. The Mozambican criminal police also interrogated her, as she was accused of presidential defamation.

In 2010, Mabota received the United States government-sponsored International Women of Courage Award. (Note: However, the US Department of State does not cite her as a laureate, but many (independent) sources report the award ceremony at the US Embassy in Maputo, Mozambique.)

In 2014, Mabota temporarily considered running for the presidential election, but eventually withdrew. She eventually decided to run for president in the 2019 elections.

== Death ==
Alice Mabota died in a hospital in South Africa on 12 October 2023, at the age of 74.
