= Party for Peace, Democracy, and Development =

Political party in Mozambique

The Party for Peace, Democracy, and Development (Portuguese: Partido para a Paz Democracia e Desenvolvimento) is a political party in Mozambique. The party is an observer of Liberal International.

The party won 2.0% of the popular vote and no seats in the 2004 legislative election. Its presidential candidate, Raul Domingos, won 2.7% of the popular vote in the presidential election.
