= Attorney General of Mozambique =

The Attorney General of Mozambique (Procurador Geral da República) is the chief law officer in the Republic of Mozambique. The Attorney General is appointed by the President of Mozambique for a period of five years.

== List of attorneys general ==
- Eduardo Mulembwe, Attorney General from late 1980s to 1994? (Certainly Attorney General in 1992.)
- Sinai Nhatitima, 1994–1997.
- Antonio Namburete, 1997–2000
- Joaquim Madeira, 2000–2007.
- Augusto Paulino, 2007–2014.
- Beatriz Buchili, 2014–present.
