= 2023 Mozambican local elections =

The 2023 Mozambican local elections were held on 11 October 2023 to elect mayors and municipal councils across the country. The results published initially by the National Election Commission (CNE) had FRELIMO winning 64 of the 65 municipalities contested, with the only city won by another party being Beira, which was won by the Democratic Movement of Mozambique. Tensions rose prior to the elections, with the police arresting members of the opposition in several cities. On October 27, after the provisional election results came out, protests broke out in several major cities such as Nampula and Maputo in reaction to alleged fraud in the election.

== Conduct ==
The United States embassy in Mozambique acknowledged credible reports of irregularities in the elections, and called for the CNR to ensure that "votes are counted accurately and transparently." The NGO Maise Integredade, which sent over 2000 observers across the country, reported irregularities at polling stations in several municipalities, including ballot stuffing and voter intimidation. Additionally, some areas of the country reported experiencing internet shutdowns following the elections.

Several district courts in Maputo recognized irregularities at polling stations and canceled voting. Similarly, in Chókwè, Gaza Province, local courts invalidated election results, however this was overturned by the Mozambican Constitutional Counsel who claimed sole authority to validate election results. Courts in Cuamba, Niassa Province, as well as KaMpfumo, Maputo annulled the results in the elections in reaction to petitions by RENAMO.

== Protests ==
On 27 October 2023, protests occurred throughout Mozambique after RENAMO called for nationwide demonstrations after several courts found voting irregularities. Five people were killed by security forces, including a 10-year-old boy in Nampula Province and a 16-year-old in Chiúre, Cabo Delgado Province. A further 27 were injured. The Mozambican government cracked down on RENAMO headquarters in Maputo and arrested dozens on October 27. Hundreds of people were still arbitrarily detained as of November 2023.

== Results ==
The official final results were published by the Constitutional Court on 29 December 2023 (The number of municipalities increased from 53 in 2018 to 65 in 2023):

Party	Seats	+/–
FRELIMO	60	▲16
RENAMO	4	▼4
Democratic Movement of Mozambique	1	1
Total	65	–
