= Lutero Simango =

Mozambique politician (born 1960)

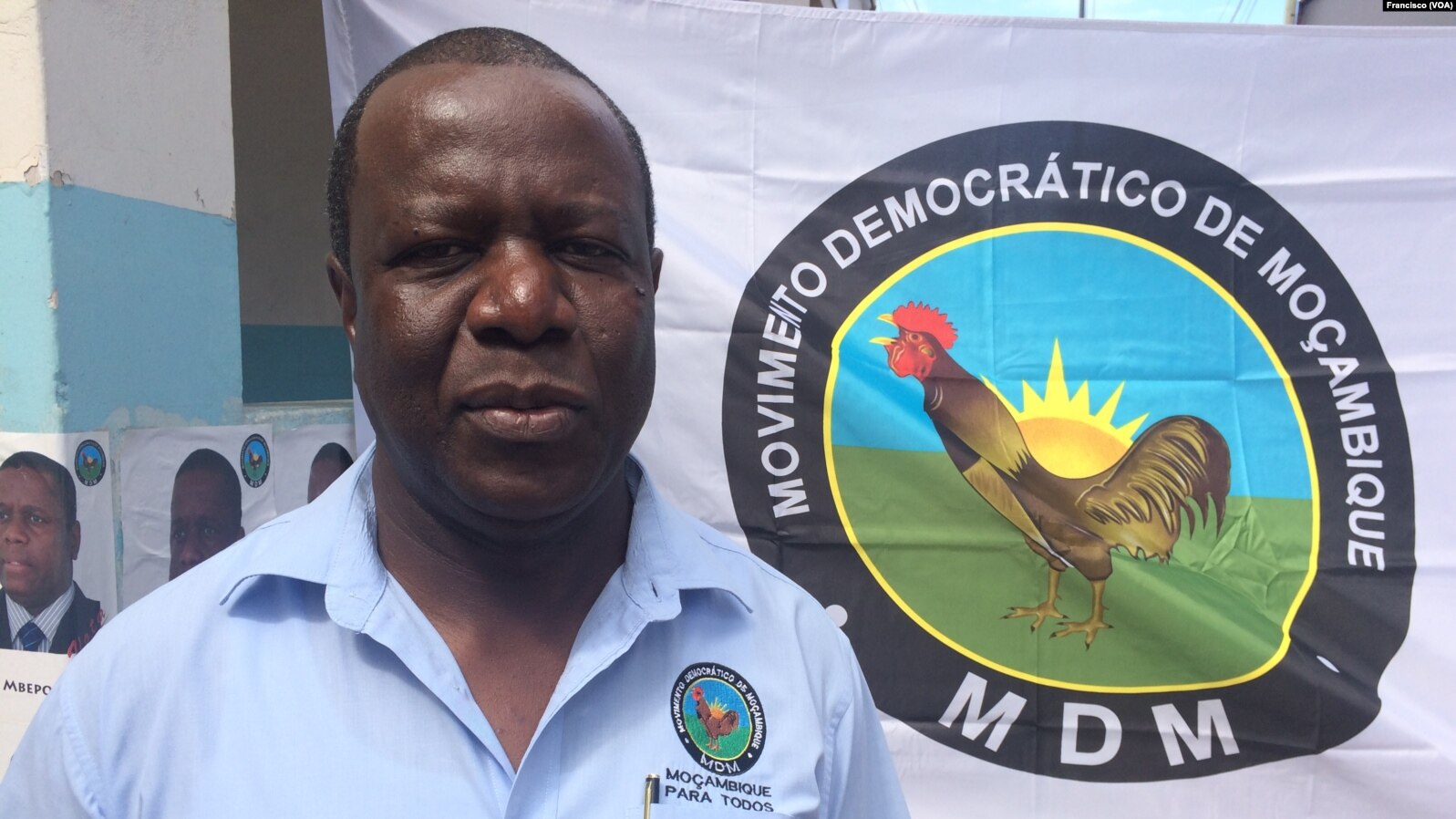
Lutero Simango in 2024

Lutero Simango (born 1960) is a Mozambique politician from the Democratic Movement of Mozambique (MDM). He has been a member of the Assembly of the Republic since 2000, where he is leader of his party.

== Political career ==
In December 2021, he was elected president of the MDM, which is the second largest party in the Mozambican opposition. He succeeded his brother in this role.

In June 2024, he was one of a number of African leaders to sign the Paris Declaration. In the 2024 Mozambican general election he was his party's candidate for president. This was after the withdrawal of Albano Carige, who had been the partys candidate. He pledged to build more factories and lower the cost of living for citizens. This was alongside support for vocational training for young people. He also advocated for reforms of the political system. In the election he won 3% of the vote for President of Mozambique.

== Personal life ==
His brother Daviz Simango, the founder of the MDM, died in February 2021. He was formerly mayor of the city of Beira.
