= Optimist Party for the Development of Mozambique =

Optimist Party for the Development of Mozambique Partido Otimista pelo Desenvolvimento de Moçambique
- Abbreviation: PODEMOS
- President: Albino Forquilha
- Secretary-General: Sebastião Mussanhane
- Founded: 7 May 2019
- Registered: 14 May 2019
- Split from: FRELIMO
- Headquarters: Rua Gulamo Khan 32, Bairro Ferroviário, Maputo
- Ideology: Socialism; Left-wing populism Machelism
- Political position: Left-wing to far-left
- Colours: Yellow; Red; Green
- Assembly of the Republic: 43 / 250

Party flag

Website
- podemos.org.mz

The Optimist Party for the Development of Mozambique (Portuguese: Partido Otimista pelo Desenvolvimento de Moçambique, PODEMOS) is a Mozambican political party of the democratic socialist ideology founded on 7 May 2019 by a sector of the ruling Mozambican Liberation Front (FRELIMO) dissident from the leadership headed by President Filipe Nyusi.

PODEMOS was founded in 2018 when the electoral court rejected the independent candidacy of Samora Machel Jr., son of Samora Machel, the first president of Mozambique, for mayor of Maputo in the 2018 municipal elections. Many members of the Youth Association for the Development of Mozambique (AJUDEM), an internal political group of FRELIMO that supported Machel, participated in the founding of PODEMOS in May of the following year. Despite this, both Machel and the party have denied any mutual relationship. The party finally obtained legal registration a week after the announcement of its foundation, on 14 May.

During the second half of May and the first half of June, the party began collecting signatures to be able to present candidates in the 2019 presidential and parliamentary elections. Less than a month after its founding, on 11 June 2019, PODEMOS announced Hélder Mendonça, a little-known musician, as its presidential candidate although he would be disqualified.

In the 2024 Mozambican general election, PODEMOS won 31 seats in the Assembly of the Republic, and supported Venâncio Mondlane candidacy for that year's presidential election. Mondlane would later move away from the party and found his own, which was registered as ANAMOLA.

== Election results ==
=== Presidential elections ===
| Election | Party candidate | Votes | % | Result |
|---|---|---|---|---|
| 2024 | Venâncio Mondlane | 1,639,333 | 24.19% | Lost ✗ |

=== Assembly elections ===
| Election | Party leader | Votes | % | Seats | +/− | Position | Result |
|---|---|---|---|---|---|---|---|
| 2019 | Albino Forquilha | 6,768 | 0.11% | 0 / 250 | New | 7th | No seats |
| 2024 | Albino Forquilha | 889,788 | 12.94% | 31 / 250 | New | ▲2nd | Opposition |
