= Daviz Simango =

Mayor of Beira, Mozambique, from 2003 to 2021

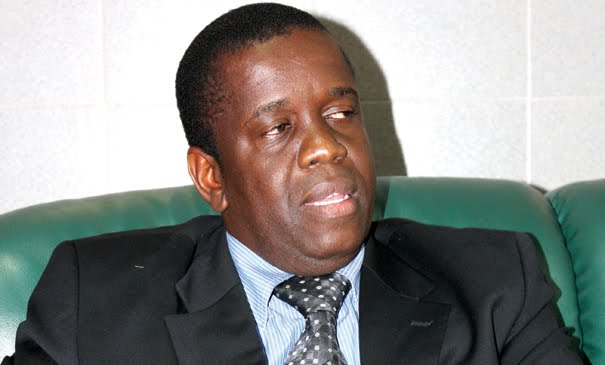

Mayor of Beira
- In office 2003–2021
- Preceded by: Chivavice Muchangage
- Succeeded by: Albano Carige

Personal details
- Born: 7 February 1964 Tanganyika
- Died: 22 February 2021 (aged 57)
- Party: MDM (2009–2021); RENAMO (1997–2009)
- Relations: Lutero Simango (brother)
- Parent(s): Uria Simango (father)
- Education: Eduardo Mondlane University
- Profession: Civil Engineer
- Website: www.davizsimango.org

Daviz Mbepo Simango (7 February 1964 – 22 February 2021) was a Mozambican politician who was Mayor of Beira from 2003 to the day of his death in February 2021. He was also the President of the Democratic Movement of Mozambique (MDM). He was son of Uria Timoteo Simango the first Vice-President of FRELIMO and Celina Tapua Simango. He joined the main opposition party RENAMO in 1997 and became Mayor of Beira in 2003 as its candidate. On March 6, 2009, he founded a new party, the Movimento Democrático de Moçambique, or MDM.

== Early life ==
Daviz Simango was born in 1964 to parents Uria Timoteo Simango and Celina Tapua Simango, and grew up in Beira, Mozambique. His brother is politician Lutero Simango. He was raised by relatives after his parents were executed in a reeducation camp in northern Mozambique for their status as dissidents within the Mozambican ruling party.

== Mayor of Beira ==
Daviz Simango ran for and was elected mayor of Beira, a major Mozambican city on the Indian Ocean, in 2003. At the time he was a member of Mozambique's primary opposition party, RENAMO. Simango was reelected mayor of Beira in 2009 as a member of his own political party, Movimento Democrático de Moçambique. He was re-elected as mayor every election cycle and served continually until his death in 2021.

After his first election, Simango faced obstruction from national ruling party FRELIMO, who refused to grant Simango's administration access to government buildings. During his time as mayor, Simango oversaw a $120 million USD climate adaptation project, involving a system of drainage canals and retaining basins to protect urban neighborhoods from rising sea levels. Simango was also mayor during Cyclone Idai, an Indian Ocean cyclone that made landfall near Beira, killing hundreds and destroying a majority of the city's infrastructure. In the wake of the storm, Simango worked on the streets to establish emergency services in the city, and spoke out internationally against climate change.

== Founding of MDM ==
In 2009, Simango left RENAMO after party leaders did not nominate him as the party's candidate for mayor. At this time, Daviz Simango founded a new political party, the Movimento Democrático de Moçambique (Democratic Movement of Mozambique), popularly known as MDM. MDM is now the third major political party in Mozambique after the long term duopoly of ruling party FRELIMO and opposition party RENAMO.

== 2009 presidential election ==
Simango was the MDM candidate in the 28 October 2009 presidential election. He placed third with 8.6% of the total vote in the election.

== 2014 presidential election ==
Simango was the MDM candidate in the 15 October 2014 Mozambican presidential election. He placed third, with 6.4% of the vote.

== 2019 presidential election ==
Simango was the MDM candidate in the 15 October 2019 Mozambican presidential election. During the campaign period, ruling party supporters blocked Simango from campaigning in Chokwe District in southern Mozambique. The election results were marred by accusations of widespread corruption and Simango placed third.

== Death ==
Daviz Simango died on 22 February 2021, fifteen days after his birthday. He was 57 years old. He flew to Johannesburg for medical care on 13 February 2021 and died nine days later of complications of COVID-19 and diabetes.
