= 2019 Mozambican general election =

- 15 October 2019
- Presidential election
- Turnout: 51.84% (▲2.81pp)
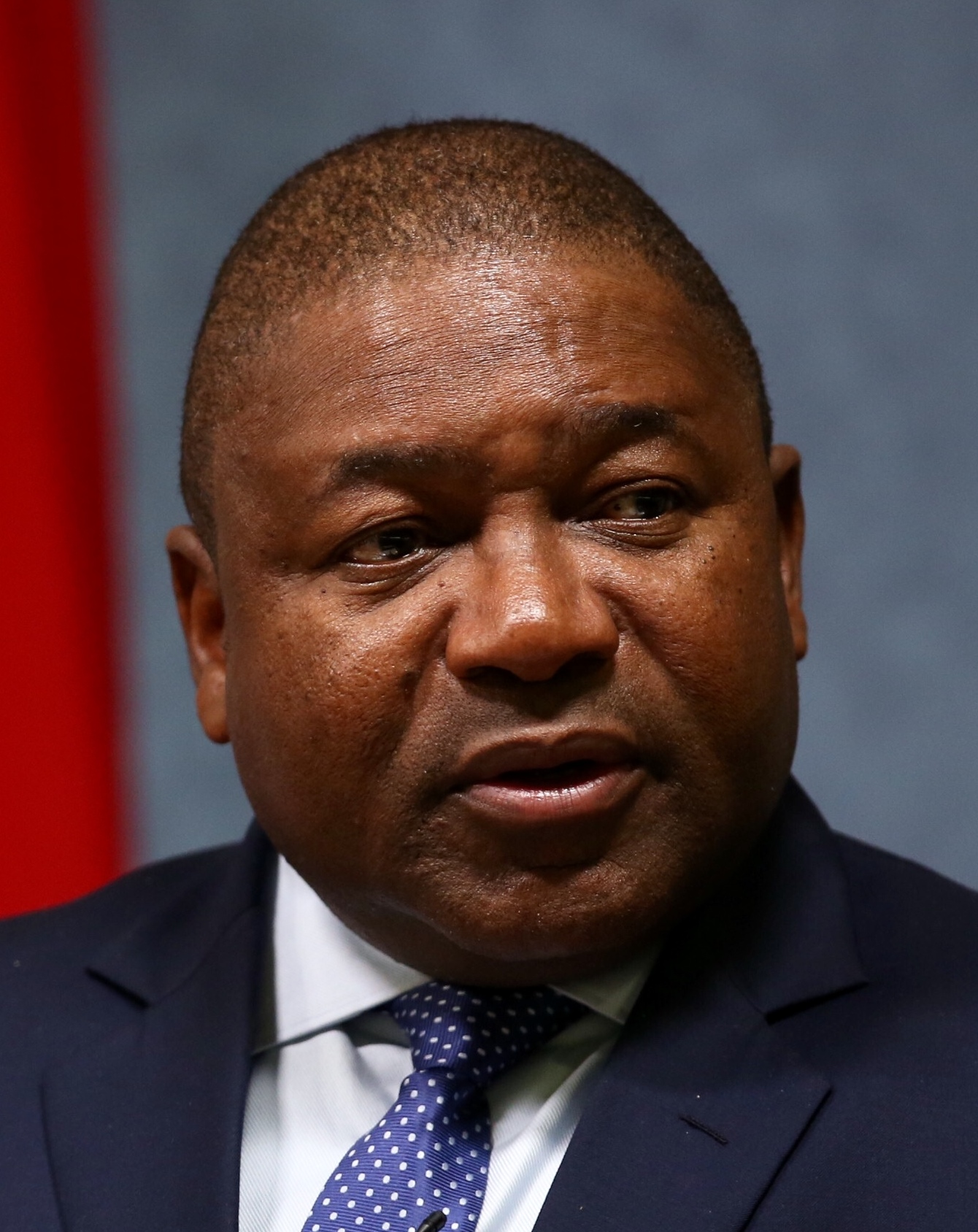

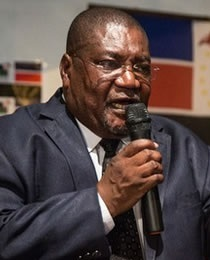
Nominee	Filipe Nyusi	Ossufo Momade
Party	FRELIMO	RENAMO
Popular vote	4,639,172	1,356,786
Percentage	73.46%	21.48%
President before election
Filipe Nyusi
FRELIMO
Elected President
Filipe Nyusi
FRELIMO
- Parliamentary election
- All 250 seats in the Assembly of the Republic; 126 seats needed for a majority
Party	Leader	Vote %	Seats	+/–
FRELIMO	Filipe Nyusi	71.28	184	+40
RENAMO	Ossufo Momade	22.28	60	−29
MDM	Daviz Simango	4.19	6	−11
This lists parties that won seats. See the complete results below.
- Maps

General elections were held in Mozambique on 15 October 2019. During the leadup to the elections, assassinations and significant intimidation of prominent leaders of opposition parties and election observers were alleged. In addition, state resources, media, and aid for cyclone victims were also alleged to be used in favour of the ruling party (FRELIMO) and its candidates. Local elections observers, civil society organizations, the Commonwealth Observer Group, the European Union Election Observation Mission, and several national and international entities classified the elections as rigged. Nevertheless, the incumbent president Filipe Nyusi of FRELIMO was declared re-elected with 73% of the vote. The main opposition party RENAMO as well as the other oppositions parties involved in the elections contested the results, claiming there were numerous irregularities, and accusing FRELIMO of "massive electoral fraud", including hundreds of thousands of "ghost voters". As evidence for the international community, Ossufo Momade, the president of the main opposition party RENAMO, transported to Europe a box filled with vote ballots that had been marked in favor of the incumbent president Filipe Nyusi of FRELIMO before the commencement of voting. Despite these occurrences, the international community largely ignored any concerns of fraud, and gradually countries started recognizing the incumbent president Filipe Nyusi of FRELIMO as the winner of the elections.

== Electoral system ==
The President of Mozambique was elected using the two-round system. The 250 members of the Assembly of the Republic were elected by proportional representation in eleven multi-member constituencies based on the country's provinces and on a first-past-the-post basis from two single-member constituencies representing Mozambican citizens in Africa and Europe. Seats in the multi-member constituencies were allocated using the D'Hondt method.

== Presidential candidates ==
On 16 January 2019 the main opposition party RENAMO held a congress at which Ossufo Momade was elected as the party's new leader and presidential candidate. Momade had been the party's interim president following the death of Afonso Dhlakama in May 2018 and was seen as a "unifying leader" that could bring the political and military sector of RENAMO closer.

The ruling FRELIMO held its congress on 6 May, at which it confirmed its decision to support the re-election of President Filipe Nyussi for a second and final term.

On 9 May and following a three-day congress, the Democratic Movement of Mozambique confirmed that its presidential candidate would be Daviz Simango, mayor of Beira since 2003. Simango was a presidential candidate in the two previous general elections.

On 31 July the Constitutional Council approved four candidates; Nyussi, Momade, Simango and Mário Albino. Two candidates were disqualified; Hélder Mendoça and Alice Mabota. Mabota would have been the first woman to run for president, but failed to collect enough signatures.

FRELIMO nominated Mércia Viriato Licá as one of their candidates. She was elected and became the youngest MP in the country's history.

== Results ==
=== President ===
Candidate	Party	Votes	%
Filipe Nyusi	FRELIMO	4,639,172	73.46
Ossufo Momade	RENAMO	1,356,786	21.48
Daviz Simango	Democratic Movement of Mozambique	273,599	4.33
Mário Albino	Action Party of the United Movement for Integral Salvation	46,048	0.73
Total		6,315,605	100.00
Valid votes		6,315,605	92.55
Invalid/blank votes		508,321	7.45
Total votes		6,823,926	100.00
Registered voters/turnout		13,162,321	51.84
Source: EISA

=== Assembly ===
Party	Votes	%	Seats	+/–
FRELIMO	4,323,298	71.28	184	+40
RENAMO	1,351,659	22.28	60	–29
Democratic Movement of Mozambique	254,290	4.19	6	–11
Action Party of the United Movement for Integral Salvation	27,277	0.45	0	New
New Democracy	25,046	0.41	0	New
Union for Change	8,347	0.14	0	0
Optimist Party for the Development of Mozambique	6,768	0.11	0	New
National Reconciliation Party	6,469	0.11	0	0
Patriotic Movement for Democracy	5,883	0.10	0	0
Union for Reconciliation Party	5,399	0.09	0	0
Party of Greens of Mozambique	5,361	0.09	0	0
Labour Party	5,173	0.09	0	0
National Party of the Mozambican People/CRD	4,143	0.07	0	New
Youth Movement for the Restoration of Democracy	4,054	0.07	0	0
National Movement for the Recovery of Mozambican Unity	3,820	0.06	0	0
Electoral Union	3,769	0.06	0	0
Mozambique People's Progress Party	3,431	0.06	0	0
Social Renewal Party	3,365	0.06	0	0
Ecological Party of Mozambique	3,313	0.05	0	New
Party of Freedom and Development	2,868	0.05	0	0
Democratic Unity	2,720	0.04	0	New
Ecological Party–Land Movement	2,579	0.04	0	0
Democratic Justice Party of Mozambique	2,036	0.03	0	New
Social Broadening Party of Mozambique	2,006	0.03	0	0
National Workers and Peasants Party	1,783	0.03	0	0
Democratic Union of Mozambique	664	0.01	0	New
Total	6,065,521	100.00	250	0
Valid votes	6,065,521	89.64		
Invalid/blank votes	700,895	10.36		
Total votes	6,766,416	100.00		
Registered voters/turnout	13,162,321	51.41		
Source: STAE

=== Provincial elections ===
Province	Seats		
Province	FRELIMO	RENAMO	MDM
Cabo Delgado Province	66	16	0
Gaza Province	81	1	0
Inhambane Province	54	6	0
Manica Province	63	17	0
Maputo Province	61	18	2
Nampula Province	63	31	0
Niassa Province	46	14	0
Sofala Province	60	13	8
Tete Province	65	17	0
Zambezia Province	69	23	0
Total	628	156	10
Source: STAE
