= David Simango =

Mozambican politician

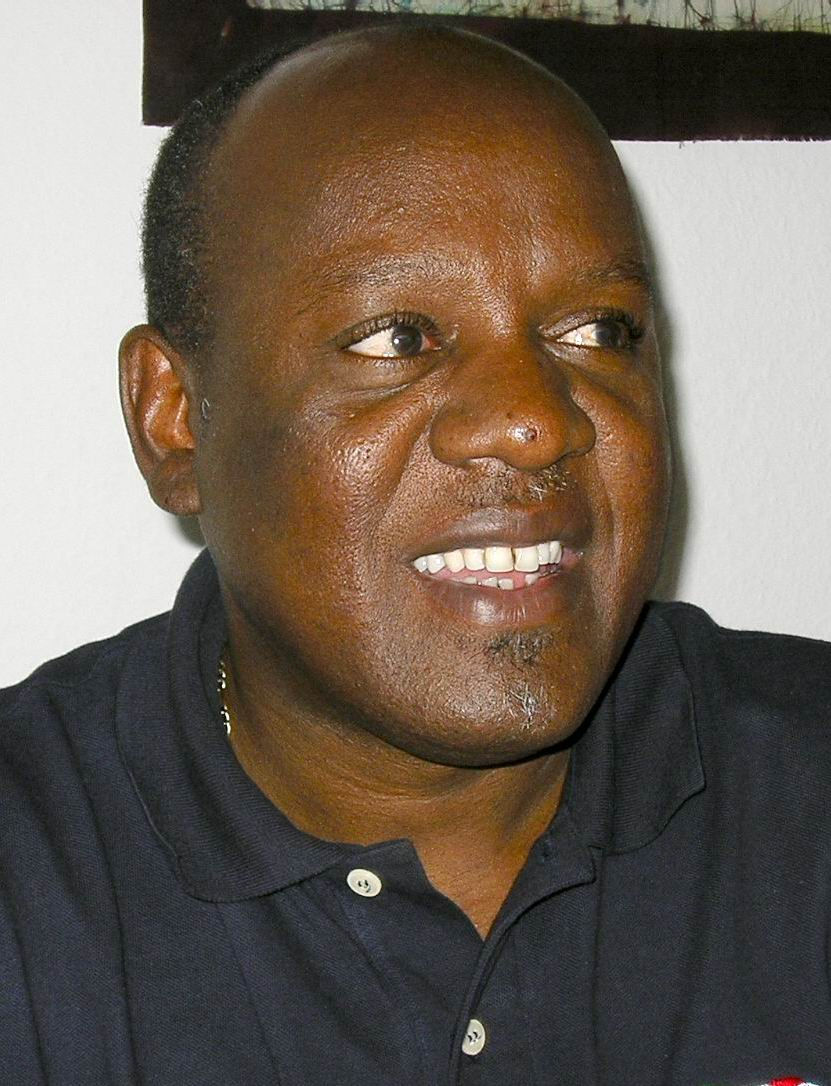
David Simango, 2006

David Simango is a Mozambican politician he was Mayor of Maputo. He is a member of FRELIMO. He was Governor of Niassa Province from 2000 to 2005 and then Minister of Youth and Sports from 2005 to 2008. He was elected as Mayor of Maputo in 2008 and 2013 and he was re-elected in 2013.
