= Ossufo Momade =

Mozambican politician (born 1961)

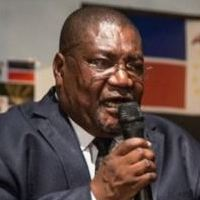
- Momade in 2018

Leader of RENAMO
- Incumbent
- Assumed office 3 May 2018
- Preceded by: Afonso Dhlakama

Personal details
- Born: 30 January 1961 (age 65) Island of Mozambique, Portuguese Mozambique
- Party: RENAMO

Ossufo Momade (born 30 January 1961) is a Mozambican politician. He has served as president of the Mozambican National Resistance (RENAMO), the main opposition party of Mozambique, since January 17, 2019. He assumed the presidency of the party after the death of its leader Afonso Dhlakama in May 2018 on an interim basis until he was elected president of the party at an internal congress held at the beginning of the following year. On August 1, 2019, Momade agreed to renounce violence and signed a peace agreement with Mozambique President Filipe Nyusi at RENAMO's remote military base in the Gorongosa mountains. This agreement resulted in the last remaining members of the RENAMO insurgency surrendering their weapons. A second signing ceremony then took place in Mapotu's Peace Square, which result in Momade declaring that he and members of RENAMO would now focus on "maintaining peace and national reconciliation."

== Early life ==
Momade was born on the Island of Mozambique when the region of Mozambique was still a Portuguese colony. He is the son of Ossufo Momade Sr. and Alide Zainabo. He attended Luís de Camões Elementary School, and after completing fourth grade in 1973, he moved to the Pêro da Covilhã Commercial School. In 1978 at the age of 17 Momade enlisted in the military.

== Civil War ==
During the outbreak of the Mozambican Civil War Momade was kidnapped by anti-communist rebels. Eventually he was persuaded to join the rebel organization called RENAMO and their leader Afonso Dhlakama. Momade eventually became the commander of the rebel's operations in the central provinces of Manica and Sofala.

== Political career ==
In 2007 Momade was elected secretary general of the party of RENAMO, a position he held until 2013 when he vacated it to Manuel Bissopo to become the appointed head of the defence and security department of RENAMO. After the death of party leader Afonso Dhlakama, Momade was made intern head of the part, a position he held until he was formally elected chief in January 2019.

On 26 June 2019 Momade was formally announced as RENAMO's candidate for the 2019 Mozambican general election.

== Peace with Mozambique government ==
On August 1, 2019, President Filipe Nyusi and Momade signed a peace agreement bringing an end to the six year RENAMO insurgency. During the signing ceremony, Momade and Nyusi also shook hands and embraced each other as well. The signing of the peace took place at RENAMO's remote military base in the Gorongosa mountains. After the agreement was signed, the last remained RENAMO fighters surrendered their weapons. Momade told the Associated Press "We will no longer commit the mistakes of the past." He also stated "We are for a humanized and dignified reintegration and we want the international community to help make that a reality." During a second signing ceremony between Nyusi and Momade which took place on August 6, 2019 in Maputo's Peace Square, Momade vowed to "maintain peace and national reconciliation."

== Personal life ==
He belongs to the Makuwa people. He is a Muslim.
