= Democratic Movement of Mozambique =

Political party in Mozambique

Democratic Movement of Mozambique Movimento Democrático de Moçambique
- Abbreviation: MDM
- Leader: Lutero Simango
- Chairman: José Domingos
- Founder: Daviz Simango
- Founded: 6 March 2009
- Split from: RENAMO
- Youth wing: Democratic Movement of Mozambique Youth League
- Ideology: Christian democracy
- Political position: Centre-right
- International affiliation: Centrist Democrat International
- Assembly of the Republic: 8 / 250

Website
- mdm.org.mz

The Democratic Movement of Mozambique (Portuguese: Movimento Democrático de Moçambique) is a political party in Mozambique. Founded on 6 March 2009, it was led by Daviz Simango, who was the Mayor of Beira. It formed after breaking with RENAMO, the main opposition party.

== History ==
=== 2009 general election ===
In the 28 October 2009 parliamentary election, the Mozambique Democratic Movement was not allowed to contest by the National Election Commission (Comissão Nacional de Eleições) in nine of the 13 voting constituencies on controversial procedural grounds. MDM secured 3.93% of the total vote and eight seats in the 250 member Assembly of the Republic. Daviz Simango was the MDM candidate in the presidential election held on the same day. He placed third with 8.59% of the total vote.

=== 2024 general election ===
Lutero Simango won 3% of the vote for President of Mozambique.

== Election results ==
=== Presidential elections ===
Election	Party candidate	Votes	%	Result
2009	Daviz Simango	340,579	8.59%	Lost ✗
2014	Daviz Simango	314,759	6.40%	Lost ✗
2019	Daviz Simango	273,599	4.33%	Lost ✗
2024	Lutero Simango	272,736	4.02%	Lost ✗

=== Assembly elections ===
Election	Party leader	Votes	%	Seats	+/−	Position	Result
2009	Daviz Simango	152,836	3.93%	8 / 250	▲8	▲3rd	Opposition
2014	Daviz Simango	385,683	8.40%	17 / 250	▲9	3rd	Opposition
2019	Daviz Simango	254,290	4.19%	6 / 250	▼11	3rd	Opposition
2024	Lutero Simango	240,409	3.50%	8 / 250	▲2	▼4th	Opposition
