= List of postos of Mozambique =

Administrative subdivisions of Mozambique

Here is a list of administrative posts (postos administrativos) of Mozambique, sorted alphabetically by province and district, based on the National Statistics Institute of Mozambique.

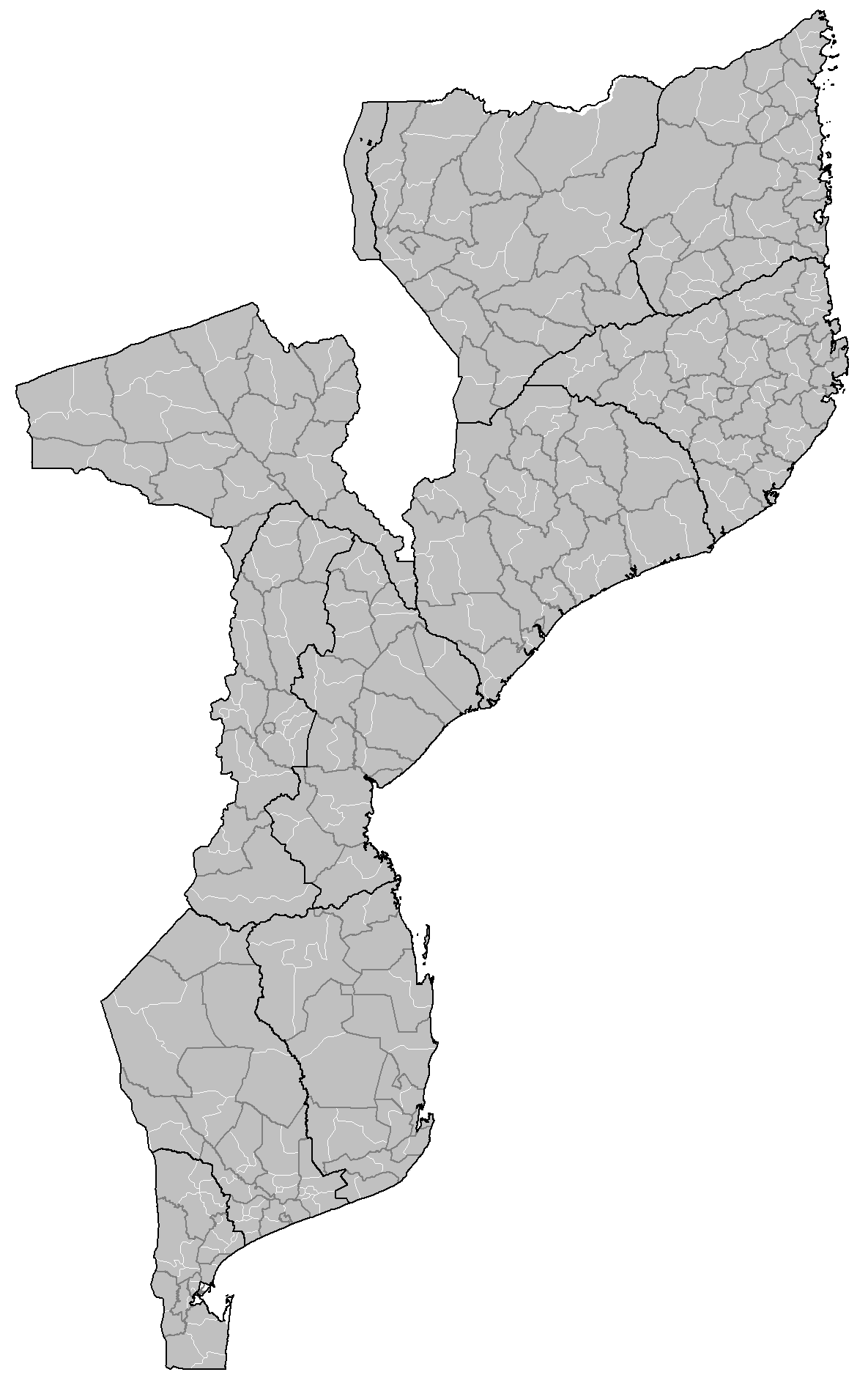
Postos of Mozambique

Province	District	Posto	Ref.
Cabo Delgado	Cidade de Pemba		
Cabo Delgado	Ancuabe	Ancuabe	
Cabo Delgado	Ancuabe	Metoro	
Cabo Delgado	Ancuabe	Meza	
Cabo Delgado	Balama	Balama	
Cabo Delgado	Balama	Impiri	
Cabo Delgado	Balama	Kwekwe	
Cabo Delgado	Balama	Mavala	
Cabo Delgado	Chiúre	Chiúre	
Cabo Delgado	Chiúre	Chiúre Velho	
Cabo Delgado	Chiúre	Katapua	
Cabo Delgado	Chiúre	Mazeze	
Cabo Delgado	Chiúre	Namogelia	
Cabo Delgado	Chiúre	Ocua	
Cabo Delgado	Ibo	Ibo	
Cabo Delgado	Ibo	Quirimba	
Cabo Delgado	Macomia	Macomia	
Cabo Delgado	Macomia	Chai	
Cabo Delgado	Macomia	Mucojo	
Cabo Delgado	Macomia	Quiterajo	
Cabo Delgado	Mecúfi	Mecúfi	
Cabo Delgado	Mecúfi	Murrebue	
Cabo Delgado	Meluco	Meluco	
Cabo Delgado	Meluco	Muaguide	
Cabo Delgado	Mocímboa da Praia	Mocímboa da Praia	
Cabo Delgado	Mocímboa da Praia	Diaca	
Cabo Delgado	Mocímboa da Praia	Mbau	
Cabo Delgado	Montepuez	Cidade de Montepuez	
Cabo Delgado	Montepuez	Mapupulo	
Cabo Delgado	Montepuez	Mirate	
Cabo Delgado	Montepuez	Nairoto	
Cabo Delgado	Montepuez	Namanhumbir	
Cabo Delgado	Mueda	Mueda	
Cabo Delgado	Mueda	Chapa	
Cabo Delgado	Mueda	Imbuho	
Cabo Delgado	Mueda	Negomano	
Cabo Delgado	Mueda	N'Gapa	
Cabo Delgado	Muidumbe	Muidumbe	
Cabo Delgado	Muidumbe	Chitunda	
Cabo Delgado	Muidumbe	Miteda	
Cabo Delgado	Namuno	Namuno	
Cabo Delgado	Namuno	Hucula	
Cabo Delgado	Namuno	Machoca	
Cabo Delgado	Namuno	Meloco	
Cabo Delgado	Namuno	Ncumpe	
Cabo Delgado	Namuno	Luli	
Cabo Delgado	Nangade	Nangade	
Cabo Delgado	Nangade	Ntamba	
Cabo Delgado	Palma	Palma	
Cabo Delgado	Palma	Olumbe	
Cabo Delgado	Palma	Pundanhar	
Cabo Delgado	Palma	Quionga	
Cabo Delgado	Pemba-Metuge	Metuge	
Cabo Delgado	Pemba-Metuge	Mieze	
Cabo Delgado	Quissanga	Quissanga	
Cabo Delgado	Quissanga	Bilibiza	
Cabo Delgado	Quissanga	Mahate	
Cidade de Maputo	Distrito Urbano de KaMpfumo (former Distrito Urbano Nº1)		
Cidade de Maputo	Distrito Urbano de Nlhamankulu/Chamanculo (former Distrito Urbano Nº 2)		
Cidade de Maputo	Distrito Urbano de KaMaxaquene/Maxaquene (former Distrito Urbano Nº 3)		
Cidade de Maputo	Distrito Urbano de KaMavota/Mavota (former Distrito Urbano Nº 4)		
Cidade de Maputo	Distrito Municipal de KaMubukwana (former Distrito Urbano Nº 5)		
Cidade de Maputo	Distrito Municipal de KaTembe/Catembe (former Distrito Urbano Nº 6)		
Cidade de Maputo	Distrito Municipal de KaNyaka/Inhaca (former Distrito Urbano Nº 7)		
Gaza	Cidade de Xai-Xai		
Gaza	Bilene Macia	Bilene Macia	
Gaza	Bilene Macia	Chissano	
Gaza	Bilene Macia	Mazivila	
Gaza	Bilene Macia	Messano	
Gaza	Bilene Macia	Praia de Bilene	
Gaza	Bilene Macia	Macuane	
Gaza	Chibuto	Cidade de Chibuto	
Gaza	Chibuto	Alto Changane	
Gaza	Chibuto	Chaimite	
Gaza	Chibuto	Changanine	
Gaza	Chibuto	Godide	
Gaza	Chibuto	Malehice	
Gaza	Chicualacuala	Chicualacuala	
Gaza	Chicualacuala	Mapai	
Gaza	Chicualacuala	Pafuri	
Gaza	Chigubo	Chigubo	
Gaza	Chigubo	Ndindiza	
Gaza	Chókwè	Cidade Chókwè	
Gaza	Chókwè	Lionde	
Gaza	Chókwè	Macarretane	
Gaza	Chókwè	Xilembene	
Gaza	Guijá	Caniçado	
Gaza	Guijá	Chivonguene	
Gaza	Guijá	Mubanguene	
Gaza	Guijá	Nalazi	
Gaza	Mabalane	Mabalane	
Gaza	Mabalane	Combomune	
Gaza	Mabalane	Ntlavane	
Gaza	Manjacaze	Mandlacaze	
Gaza	Manjacaze	Chalala	
Gaza	Manjacaze	Chibonzane	
Gaza	Manjacaze	Chidenguele	
Gaza	Manjacaze	Macuacua	
Gaza	Manjacaze	Mazucane	
Gaza	Manjacaze	Nguzene	
Gaza	Massangena	Massangena	
Gaza	Massangena	Muvue	
Gaza	Massingir	Massingir	
Gaza	Massingir	Mavodze	
Gaza	Massingir	Zulo	
Gaza	Xai-Xai	Chicumbane	
Gaza	Xai-Xai	Chongoene	
Gaza	Xai-Xai	Zonguene	
Inhambane	Cidade de Inhambane		
Inhambane	Funhalouro	Funhalouro	
Inhambane	Funhalouro	Tome	
Inhambane	Govuro	Nova Mambone	
Inhambane	Govuro	Save	
Inhambane	Homoíne	Homoíne	
Inhambane	Homoíne	Pembe	
Inhambane	Inharrime	Inharrime	
Inhambane	Inharrime	Mucumbi	
Inhambane	Inhassoro	Inhassoro	
Inhambane	Inhassoro	Bazaruto	
Inhambane	Jangamo	Jangamo	
Inhambane	Jangamo	Cumbana	
Inhambane	Mabote	Mabote	
Inhambane	Mabote	Zimane	
Inhambane	Mabote	Zinave	
Inhambane	Massinga	Massinga	
Inhambane	Massinga	Chicomo	
Inhambane	Cidade de Maxixe		
Inhambane	Morrumbene	Morrumbene	
Inhambane	Morrumbene	Mucodoene	
Inhambane	Panda	Panda	
Inhambane	Panda	Mawayela	
Inhambane	Panda	Urrene	
Inhambane	Vilanculos	Vilanculos	
Inhambane	Vilanculos	Mapinhane	
Inhambane	Zavala	Quissico	
Inhambane	Zavala	Zandamela	
Manica	Bárue	Catandica	
Manica	Bárue	Choa	
Manica	Bárue	Nhampassa	
Manica	Macate	Macate	
Manica	Macate	Zembe	
Manica	Cidade de Chimoio		
Manica	Gondola	Gondola	
Manica	Gondola	Amatongas	
Manica	Gondola	Cafumpe	
Manica	Gondola	Inchope	
Manica	Gondola	Matsinho	
Manica	Guro	Guro	
Manica	Guro	Dacata	
Manica	Guro	Mandie	
Manica	Guro	Mungari	
Manica	Guro	Nhamassonge	
Manica	Machaze	Machaze	
Manica	Machaze	Save	
Manica	Macossa	Macossa	
Manica	Macossa	Nguawala	
Manica	Macossa	Nhamangua	
Manica	Manica	Cidade de Manica	
Manica	Manica	Machipanda	
Manica	Manica	Messica	
Manica	Manica	Mavonde	
Manica	Mossurize	Espungabera	
Manica	Mossurize	Chiurairue	
Manica	Mossurize	Dacata	
Manica	Sussundenga	Sussundenga	
Manica	Sussundenga	Dombé	
Manica	Sussundenga	Muhoa	
Manica	Sussundenga	Rotanda	
Manica	Tambara	Nhacolo	
Manica	Tambara	Buzua	
Manica	Tambara	Nhacafula	
Manica	Vanduzi	Matsinho	
Manica	Vanduzi	Vanduzi	
Maputo	Matola	Matola Cidade	
Maputo	Matola	Infulene	
Maputo	Matola	Machava	
Maputo	Boane	Boane	
Maputo	Boane	Matola Rio	
Maputo	Magude	Magude	
Maputo	Magude	Mapulanguene	
Maputo	Magude	Motaze	
Maputo	Magude	Mahela	
Maputo	Magude	Panjane	
Maputo	Manhiça	Manhiça	
Maputo	Manhiça	Calanga	
Maputo	Manhiça	Ilha Josina Machel	
Maputo	Manhiça	Maluana	
Maputo	Manhiça	Xinavane	
Maputo	Manhiça	3 de Fevereiro	
Maputo	Marracuene	Marracuene	
Maputo	Marracuene	Machubo	
Maputo	Matutuíne	Missevene	
Maputo	Matutuíne	Catembe	
Maputo	Matutuíne	Catuane	
Maputo	Matutuíne	Machangulo	
Maputo	Matutuíne	Zitundo	
Maputo	Moamba	Moamba	
Maputo	Moamba	Pessene	
Maputo	Moamba	Ressano Garcia	
Maputo	Moamba	Sabie	
Maputo	Namaacha	Namaacha	
Maputo	Namaacha	Changalane	
Nampula	Cidade de Nampula	Urbano Central	
Nampula	Cidade de Nampula	Muatala	
Nampula	Cidade de Nampula	Muhala	
Nampula	Cidade de Nampula	Namikopo	
Nampula	Cidade de Nampula	Napipine	
Nampula	Cidade de Nampula	Natikire	
Nampula	Angoche	Cidade de Angoche	
Nampula	Angoche	Aube	
Nampula	Angoche	Namaponda	
Nampula	Angoche	Boila-Nametoria	
Nampula	Eráti	Namapa	
Nampula	Eráti	Alua	
Nampula	Eráti	Namiroa	
Nampula	Ilha de Mocambique	Cidade Ilha de Mocambique	
Nampula	Ilha de Mocambique	Lumbo	
Nampula	Lalaua	Lalaua	
Nampula	Lalaua	Meti	
Nampula	Malema	Malema	
Nampula	Malema	Chihulo	
Nampula	Malema	Mutuali	
Nampula	Meconta	Meconta	
Nampula	Meconta	Corrane	
Nampula	Meconta	Namialo	
Nampula	Meconta	7 de Abril	
Nampula	Mecubúri	Mecubúri	
Nampula	Mecubúri	Milhana	
Nampula	Mecubúri	Muite	
Nampula	Mecubúri	Namina	
Nampula	Memba	Memba	
Nampula	Memba	Chipene	
Nampula	Memba	Lurio	
Nampula	Memba	Mazue	
Nampula	Mogincual	Mongicuala	
Nampula	Mogincual	Quinga	
Nampula	Mogincual	Chunga	
Nampula	Mogincual	Quixaxe	
Nampula	Mogincual	Liupo	
Nampula	Mogovolas	Nametil	
Nampula	Mogovolas	Calipo	
Nampula	Mogovolas	Ilute	
Nampula	Mogovolas	Muatua	
Nampula	Mogovolas	Nanhupo	
Nampula	Moma	Macone	
Nampula	Moma	Chalaua	
Nampula	Moma	Larde	
Nampula	Moma	Mucuali	
Nampula	Monapo	Monapo	
Nampula	Monapo	Itoculo	
Nampula	Monapo	Netia	
Nampula	Mossuril	Mossuril	
Nampula	Mossuril	Lunga	
Nampula	Mossuril	Matibane	
Nampula	Muecate	Muecate	
Nampula	Muecate	Imala	
Nampula	Muecate	Muculuone	
Nampula	Murrupula	Murrupula	
Nampula	Murrupula	Chinga	
Nampula	Murrupula	Nehessine	
Nampula	Cidade de Nacala Porto	Urbano Maiaia	
Nampula	Cidade de Nacala Porto	Urbano Mutiva	
Nampula	Cidade de Nacala Porto	Urbano Muanona	
Nampula	Nacala-a-Velha	Nacala-a-Velha	
Nampula	Nacala-a-Velha	Covo	
Nampula	Nacarôa	Nacarôa	
Nampula	Nacarôa	Intete	
Nampula	Nacarôa	Saua-Saua	
Nampula	Rapale	Rapale	
Nampula	Rapale	Anchilo	
Nampula	Rapale	Mutivaze	
Nampula	Rapale	Namaita	
Nampula	Ribaué	Ribaué	
Nampula	Ribaué	Kunle	
Nampula	Ribaué	Iapala	
Niassa	Cidade de Lichinga		
Niassa	Cuamba	Cidade de Cuamba	
Niassa	Cuamba	Etatara	
Niassa	Cuamba	Lurio	
Niassa	Lago	Metangula	
Niassa	Lago	Cobue	
Niassa	Lago	Lunho	
Niassa	Lago	Maniamba	
Niassa	Lichinga	Chimbonila	
Niassa	Lichinga	Lione	
Niassa	Lichinga	Meponda	
Niassa	Majune	Majune	
Niassa	Majune	Muaquia	
Niassa	Majune	Nairrubi	
Niassa	Mandimba	Mandimba	
Niassa	Mandimba	Mitande	
Niassa	Marrupa	Marrupa	
Niassa	Marrupa	Marangira	
Niassa	Marrupa	Nungo	
Niassa	Maúa	Maúa	
Niassa	Maúa	Maiaca	
Niassa	Mavago	Mavago	
Niassa	Mavago	M'Sawize	
Niassa	Mecanhelas	Mecanhelas	
Niassa	Mecanhelas	Chiuta	
Niassa	Mecula	Mecula	
Niassa	Mecula	Matondovela	
Niassa	Metarica	Metarica	
Niassa	Metarica	Mucumua	
Niassa	Muembe	Muembe	
Niassa	Muembe	Chiconono	
Niassa	N'gauma	Massangulo	
Niassa	N'gauma	Itepela	
Niassa	Nipepe	Nipepe	
Niassa	Nipepe	Muipite	
Niassa	Sanga	Sanga	
Niassa	Sanga	Lussimbeze	
Niassa	Sanga	Macaloge	
Niassa	Sanga	Matchedje	
Sofala	Cidade de Beira	Urbano 1 - Central	
Sofala	Cidade de Beira	Urbano 2 - Munhava	
Sofala	Cidade de Beira	Urbano 3 - Inhamizua	
Sofala	Cidade de Beira	Urbano 4 - Manga Loforte	
Sofala	Cidade de Beira	Urbano 5 - Nhangau	
Sofala	Búzi	Búzi	
Sofala	Búzi	Estaquinha	
Sofala	Búzi	Nova-Sofala	
Sofala	Caia	Caia	
Sofala	Caia	Murraça	
Sofala	Caia	Sena	
Sofala	Chemba	Chemba	
Sofala	Chemba	Chiramba	
Sofala	Chemba	Mulima	
Sofala	Cheringoma	Inhaminga	
Sofala	Cheringoma	Inhamitanga	
Sofala	Chibabava	Chibabava	
Sofala	Chibabava	Goonda	
Sofala	Chibabava	Muxungue	
Sofala	Dondo	Cidade de Dondo	
Sofala	Dondo	Mafambisse	
Sofala	Gorongosa	Gorongosa	
Sofala	Gorongosa	Nhamadzi	
Sofala	Gorongosa	Vanduzi	
Sofala	Machanga	Machanga	
Sofala	Machanga	Divinhe	
Sofala	Maringué	Maringué	
Sofala	Maringué	Canxixe	
Sofala	Maringué	Subui	
Sofala	Marromeu	Marromeu	
Sofala	Marromeu	Chupanga	
Sofala	Muanza	Muanza	
Sofala	Muanza	Galinha	
Sofala	Nhamatanda	Nhamatanda	
Sofala	Nhamatanda	Tica	
Tete	Cidade de Tete		
Tete	Angónia	Ulongoe	
Tete	Angónia	Domue	
Tete	Cahora-Bassa	Songo	
Tete	Cahora-Bassa	Chitholo	
Tete	Cahora-Bassa	Chitima	
Tete	Changara	Luenha	
Tete	Changara	Chioco	
Tete	Changara	Mavara	
Tete	Chifunde	Chifunde	
Tete	Chifunde	Mualadzi	
Tete	Chifunde	N'Sadzo	
Tete	Chiuta	Kazula	
Tete	Chiuta	Mange	
Tete	Macanga	Furancungo	
Tete	Macanga	Chidzolomondo	
Tete	Magoé	Mpheende	
Tete	Magoé	Chinthopo	
Tete	Magoé	Mukumbura	
Tete	Marávia	Chiputo	
Tete	Marávia	Fingoe	
Tete	Marávia	Molowera	
Tete	Marávia	Chepera	
Tete	Moatize	Moatize	
Tete	Moatize	Kambulatsitsi	
Tete	Moatize	Zombue	
Tete	Mutarara	Nhamayabue	
Tete	Mutarara	Chare	
Tete	Mutarara	Doa	
Tete	Mutarara	Inhangoma	
Tete	Tsangano	Ntengo-Wambalame	
Tete	Tsangano	Tsangano	
Tete	Zumbo	Zumbo	
Tete	Zumbo	Muze	
Tete	Zumbo	Zambue	
Zambézia	Cidade de Quelimane		
Zambézia	Alto Molócue	Alto Molócue	
Zambézia	Alto Molócue	Nauela	
Zambézia	Chinde	Chinde - Sede	
Zambézia	Chinde	Luabo	
Zambézia	Chinde	Micaune	
Zambézia	Gilé	Gilé	
Zambézia	Gilé	Alto Ligonha	
Zambézia	Gurué	Cidade de Gurué	
Zambézia	Gurué	Lioma	
Zambézia	Gurué	Nepuagiua	
Zambézia	Ile	Ile	
Zambézia	Ile	Mulevala	
Zambézia	Ile	Socone	
Zambézia	Inhassunge	Mucupia	
Zambézia	Inhassunge	Gonhane	
Zambézia	Lugela	Lugela	
Zambézia	Lugela	Tacuane	
Zambézia	Lugela	Munhamade	
Zambézia	Lugela	Muabanama	
Zambézia	Maganja da Costa	Maganja da Costa	
Zambézia	Maganja da Costa	Bojone	
Zambézia	Maganja da Costa	Mocubela	
Zambézia	Maganja da Costa	Nante	
Zambézia	Milange	Milange	
Zambézia	Milange	Majaua	
Zambézia	Milange	Molumbo	
Zambézia	Milange	Mongue	
Zambézia	Mocuba	Cidade de Mocuba	
Zambézia	Mocuba	Mugeba	
Zambézia	Mocuba	Namajavira	
Zambézia	Mopeia	Mopeia	
Zambézia	Mopeia	Campo	
Zambézia	Morrumbala	Morrumbala	
Zambézia	Morrumbala	Chire	
Zambézia	Morrumbala	Derre	
Zambézia	Morrumbala	Megaza	
Zambézia	Namacurra	Namacurra	
Zambézia	Namacurra	Mucuse	
Zambézia	Namarroi	Namarroi	
Zambézia	Namarroi	Regone	
Zambézia	Nicoadala	Nicoadala	
Zambézia	Nicoadala	Maquival	
Zambézia	Pebane	Pebane	
Zambézia	Pebane	Mulela Mualama	
Zambézia	Pebane	Naburi	

== See also ==
- Provinces of Mozambique
- Districts of Mozambique
