= Lichinga Solar Power Station =

Solar farm in Mozambique

- Country: Mozambique
- Location: Lichinga, Lichinga District, Niassa Province
- Coordinates: 13°17′56″S 35°13′56″E
- Status: Proposed
- Construction cost: US$200 million
- Owner: Gigawatt Solar Consortium
- Operator: GSC

Solar farm
- Type: Flat-panel PV

Power generation
- Nameplate capacity: 50 MW (67,000 hp)

The Lichinga Solar Power Station, is a planned 50 MW (67,000 hp) solar power plant in Mozambique. The solar farm is under development by a consortium comprising Gigawatt Global, a Dutch multinational IPP and the Anglican Church of Niassa, based in Niassa Province, in northwestern Mozambique. The energy generated here is to be sold to Electricidade de Moçambique (EDM), the Mozambican public electric utility company, for distribution to Lago District, Mecula District, Mecanhelas District, Mavago District and Mandimba District.

== Location ==
The power station is located in the city of Lichinga, the capital of both Lichinga District and Niassa Province. Lichinga is located east of Lake Malawi and is approximately 727 kilometres (452 mi), west of the port city of Pemba, on the Indian Ocean coast.

== Overview ==
In August 2019, Gigawatt Global and the Anglican Church of Niassa committed in writing, to jointly invest US$200 million to design, construct, own and operate this renewable energy infrastructure project. The energy generated here, to be sold to EDM for distribution in six districts of Niassa Province, to stabilize the national grid there, create employment and spur economic and social development.

== Developers ==
The power station was developed by a consortium, which owns the station. For descriptive purposes we will call that consortium: Gigawatt Solar Consortium. The consortium comprises the corporate entities listed in the table below.

Gigawatt Solar Consortium Ownership
Rank	Name of Owner	Domicile	Notes
1	Gigawatt Global	Netherlands	
2	Anglican Church of Niassa	Mozambique	

== Other considerations ==
Feasibility studies were expected to begin in September 2019. The outcome of those studies would inform the selection of the EPC contractor. It is expected that at least 200 individuals would be employed in the construction phase of this project. Other benefits include the boost to local businesses in the areas of transport, accommodation, catering and retail sales of fast moving consumer goods.

== See also ==
- List of power stations in Mozambique
