= Inhaminga =

Administrative post in Cheringoma District, Mozambique

- Administrative post and town
- Location within Mozambique
- Coordinates: 18°24′55″S 35°01′21″E
- Country: Mozambique
- Province: Sofala
- District: Cheringoma
- Elevation: 314 m (1,030 ft)
- Time zone: UTC+2:00 (CAT)

Inhaminga is an administrative post and town in Cheringoma District of Sofala Province in Mozambique. The town as of 2018 had a population of around 20,000.

== Geography ==
It is bordered to the north and northwest by Caia District, to the west by Gorongosa District and Maringue District, to the south by Muanza District, to the east and southeast by the Indian Ocean, and to the northeast by Marromeu District.

== History ==
The Inhaminga Massacre took place here on April 25, 1974 by PIDE forces against the local population. Inhaminga was severely affected by fighting during the civil war in Mozambique.

Recovery since the civil war has been poor, and as of 2018 many buildings destroyed during the conflict hadn't been rebuilt.

== Notable landmarks ==
- Instituto de Formação de Professores de Inhaminga

== Transport ==
It is served by a station on the Central railway of Mozambique Railways.

== Notable people ==
- Daniel Chapo (born 1977), jurist, politician and journalist, governor of Inhambane Province from 2016 to 2024 and 2024 Presidential candidate.
- Ungulani Ba Ka Khosa (born 1957), writer.

== See also ==
- Railway stations in Mozambique
