= Licungo River =

River in Mozambique

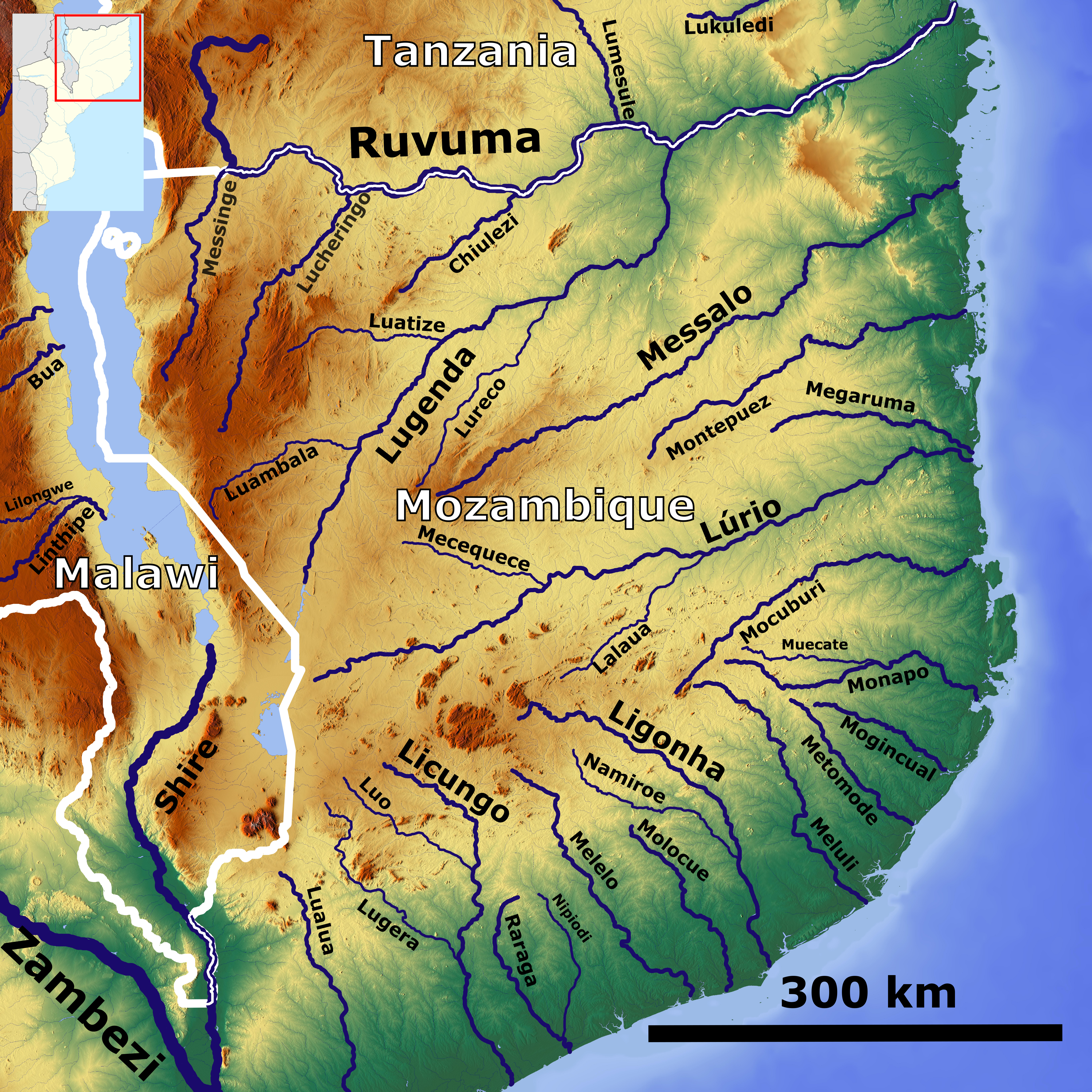
- The Licungo River in northern Mozambique (bottom center)

Location
- Country: Mozambique

Physical characteristics
- Source
  - location: Gurué District, Mozambique
  - coordinates: 15°25′5.96″S 36°58′41.15″E
- Mouth: Indian Ocean
  - location: Mozambique Channel
  - coordinates: 17°40′48.6″S 37°20′15.62″E

The Licungo is a river of Mozambique in Zambezia Province. The river begins north of Gurúè and flows south to the Indian Ocean.

Leaving Gurué District, the river forms the border between Namarroi and Ile and then the southern border of Lugela District before entering Mocuba District. At the city of Mocuba, the Licungo is joined by the Lugela river flowing from near the border with Malawi. The river then forms the border between Namacurra and Maganja da Costa districts.

Flooding is a recurring issue, including in the 2000 Mozambique flood. Floods in January 2015 had 64 fatalities and the bridge for National Road 1 in Mocuba collapsed.

In 2018, the basin is the focus of mapping initiative by the National Institute for Disaster Management (INGC), supported by the World Food Programme. The basin has also been assessed by the Dutch Risk Reduction team.

Agricultural areas include the Munda Munda plain and Sena sugar estates.
