= Nacala-a-Velha District =

Coordinates: 14.566°S 40.723°E

- Interactive map of Nacala-a-Velha District

Nacala-a-Velha District is a district of Nampula Province in north-eastern Mozambique.

The area of the district is 1,720 km^{2}. It is bounded on the north by Memba District, on the northwest by Nacaroa District, on the east by Monapo District, on the south by Mossuril District, on the southeast by Nacala District, and on the east by Fernao Veloso Bay.

The population of the district is 106,543 (2012 census).

The district is divided into two administrative posts (postos), Nacala-a-Velha (pop. 80,155), and Covo (pop. 26,387).
