= Morrumbala District =

Coordinates: 17.329°S 35.591°E

Morrumbala District is a district of Zambezia Province in Mozambique. The town of Morrumbala is the district headquarters.

The Shire River forms the western boundary of the district, separating the district from Tete Province and Malawi. The Ruo River, a tributary of the Shire, forms the northwestern boundary. Milange District lies to the north. Mocuba District lies to the east, and Nicoadala District to the southeast. Mopeia District is to the south.

Most of the district lies on the Morrumbala Plateau. The plateau drops steeply on its western edge, called the Morrumbala Escarpment, to the valley of the Shire River. Mount Morrumbala (1,172 m.) lies on the western edge of the plateau.
