= Lugela District =

- District
- District location in Mozambique

- Location within Mozambique
- Coordinates: 15°19′S 36°11′E
- Country: Mozambique
- Province: Zambezia Province
- Capital: Lugela

Area
  - Total: 6,001 km^{2} (2,317 sq mi)

Population (2006)
  - Total: 133,439
- Time zone: UTC+2 (CAT)
- ISO 3166 code: MZ

Lugela District is a district of Zambezia Province in Mozambique. It covers 6110 km^{2} with 133.439 inhabitants in 2005. Its seat is the town of Lugela.

The district is inhabited mostly by the ethnic group of Manhauas and Emanhua is the most spoken language.

== Geography ==
Lugela District borders in the north with the Namarroi District from which it is separated by the Lú River. In the south it separated from the Mocuba District by the Lugela River and Licungo River. In the east it borders to the Ile District and in the west with Milange District.

Its highest peak is Mount Mabu that culminates to 1,700 m.

== Administrative division ==
- Administrative post of Lugela:
  - Lugela
  - Mussengane
  - Nagobo
  - Phutine
  - Taba
- Administrative post of Muabanama:
  - Comone
  - M'Pemula
  - Muabanama
- Administrative post of Munhamade:
  - Alto Lugela
  - Cuba
  - Mulide
  - Munhamade
  - Tenede
- Administrative post of Tacuane:
  - Ebide
  - Mabu
  - Tacuane
