= Magoé District =

Coordinates: 15.807°S 31.752°E

Magoé
- District
- Magoé District on the map of Mozambique
- Country: Mozambique
- Province: Tete
- Capital: Mpheende

Area
  - Total: 8,792 km^{2} (3,395 sq mi)

Population (2007 census)
  - Total: 70,614
  - Density: 8.032/km^{2} (20.80/sq mi)

Magoé District is a district of Tete Province in western Mozambique. Its administrative center is the town of Mpheende. The district is located in the north of the province, and borders with Zumbo District in the north, Marávia District in the northeast, Cahora-Bassa District in the east, and with Zimbabwe in the south and in the west. The area of the district is 8,792 square kilometres (3,395 mi^{2}). It had a population of 89,273 as of 2017.

== Geography ==
The Zambezi crosses the district from west to east. Upstream of Songo, it is built up as the Lago Cahora Bassa, a water reservoir.

According to the Köppen climate classification, the climate of the district is that of hot steppe (BSh). There is no meteorological stations in the district; the closest station, in Chicôa, registers the average annual rainfall of 635 millimetres (25.0 in).

== Demographics ==
As of 2005, 49% of the population of the district was younger than 15 years. 23% of the population spoke Portuguese. The most common mothertongue among the population was Cinyungwe. 72% were analphabetic, mostly women.

== Administrative divisions ==
The district is divided into three postos, Mpheende, Chinhopo, and Mukumbura, which in total comprise six localities.

== Economy ==
Less than 1% of the households in the district have access to electricity.

=== Agriculture ===
In the district, there are 9,000 farms which have on average 1.0 hectare (0.0039 mi^{2}) of land. The main agricultural products are maize, cowpea, peanut, and sweet potato.

=== Transportation ===
There is a road network in the district which is 211 kilometres (131 mi) long. All roads are in a very bad state.
