= Chiuta District =

Coordinates: 15.564°S 33.302°E

Chiuta
- District
- Interactive map of Chiuta
- Country: Mozambique
- Province: Tete
- Capital: Manje

Area
  - Total: 6,887 km^{2} (2,659 sq mi)

Population (2007 census)
  - Total: 74,534
  - Density: 10.82/km^{2} (28.03/sq mi)

Chiuta District is a district of Tete Province in western Mozambique. The principal town is Manje. The district is located in the center of the province, and borders with Chifunde District in the north, Macanga District in the northeast, Tsangano District in the east, Moatize District in the southeast, Changara District in the south, Cahora-Bassa District in the southwest, and with Marávia District in the west. The area of the district is 6,887 square kilometres (2,659 mi^{2}). It has a population of 74,534 as of 2007.

== Geography ==
The Zambezi makes the southwestern border of the district. Other major rivers in the district are the Revúboé River, the Chiritse River, the Luye River, the Phonfi River, and the Mavudzi River.

The climate of the district is tropical humid, with the average annual rainfall being 1,135 millimetres (44.7 in).

== Demographics ==
As of 2005, 50% of the population of the district was younger than 15 years. 15% of the population spoke Portuguese. The most common mothertongue among the population was Cinyungwe. 84% were analphabetic, mostly women.

== Administrative divisions ==
The district is divided into two postos, Kazula (four localities) and Manje (four localities).

== Economy ==
Less than 1% of the households in the district have access to electricity.

=== Agriculture ===
In the district, there are 14,000 farms which have on average 1.0 hectare (0.0039 mi^{2}) of land. The main agricultural products are corn, cassava, cowpea, peanut, sugar cane, and sweet potato.

=== Transportation ===
There is a road network in the district which is 240 kilometres (150 mi) long and includes a 90 kilometres (56 mi) stretch of the national road EN222 connecting Mavudzi with the bridge over the Zambezi.
