= Inhassunge District =

District in Zambezia, Mozambique

Coordinates: 18.058°S 36.810°E

Inhassunge district in Mozambique

Inhassunge District is a district of the province of Zambezia Province in Mozambique, with its headquarters in the town of Mucupia. It has a borders, to the north with the municipality of Quelimane and with the district of Nicoadala, to the west with the district of Mopeia, to the south with the district of Chinde and to the east with the Indian Ocean.

== Demographics ==
In 2007, the Mozambican Census indicated a population of 91,196 residents. The district is in total, 745 km^{2} and a population density of 122.41 inhabitants per km^{2}.

According to the 1997 Census, the district had 87,396 inhabitants, resulting in a population density of 117.3 inhabitants per km^{2}, making this district the smallest and most densely populated of Zambezia.

== Administrative divisions ==
The district is divided in two administrative divisions (Gonhane and Mucupia), composed by the following localities:

- Gonhane Administrative Division:
  - Gonhane
- Mucupia Administrative Division:
  - Chirimane
  - Ilova
  - Mucupia
