= Nyungwe =

Nyungwe may refer to:

- Nyungwe language, also called Cinyungwe, a Bantu language spoken in Mozambique
- Nyungwe Forest, a national park in Rwanda
