= Macanga District =

Coordinates: 14.903°S 33.616°E

Macanga
- District
- Macanga District on the map of Mozambique
- Country: Mozambique
- Province: Tete
- Capital: Furancungo

Area
  - Total: 6,999 km^{2} (2,702 sq mi)

Population (2007 census)
  - Total: 112,551
  - Density: 16.08/km^{2} (41.65/sq mi)

Macanga is a district situated in the north part of Tete Province in the central region of Mozambique. Its administrative center is the town of Furancungo. The district is located in the north of the province, and borders with Dedza District and Lilongwe District of Malawi in the north, Angónia District in the east, Tsangano District in the southeast, Chiuta District in the south, and with Chifunde District in the west. The area of the district is 6,999 square kilometres (2,702 mi^{2}). It has a population of 112,551 as of 2007.

== Geography ==
The district belongs to the drainage basin of the Zambezi. The major rivers in the district are the Calidzipiri River, the Lhangue River, the Chiritse River, the Namanzi River, the M'phonfi River, the Modzi River, and the Mavudzi River.

According to the Köppen climate classification, the climate of the district is tropical humid (Cw). In the mountains, the average annual rainfall is 1,130 millimetres (44 in).

== Demographics ==
As of 2005, 49% of the population of the district was younger than 15 years. 13% of the population spoke Portuguese. The most common mothertongue among the population was Cinyungwe. 80% were analphabetic, mostly women.

== Administrative divisions ==
The district is divided into two postos, Furancungo and Chidzolomondo, which in total comprise seven localities.

== Economy ==
Less than 1% of the households in the district have access to electricity.

=== Agriculture ===
In the district, there are 13,000 farms which have on average 1.0 hectare (0.0039 mi^{2}) of land. The main agricultural products are corn, cassava, cowpea, peanut, tobacco, and sweet potato.

=== Transportation ===
There is a road network in the district which includes a stretch of the national road EN222 connecting Furancungo and Mualadzi with the Matema Crossing.
