= Mount Tumbine =

Mountain in Mozambique

- Location within Mozambique

Highest point
- Elevation: 1,542 m (5,059 ft)
- Coordinates: 16°04′59″S 35°48′33″E

Geography
- Location: Mozambique

Mount Tumbine is a mountain in Milange District of Zambézia Province in northern Mozambique, immediately east of the town of Milange.

The Ruo River, which forms the border between Mozambique and Malawi, runs north of the mountain, separating it from the larger Mulanje Massif in Malawi. It is surrounded by plains on the east, south, and west.

The mountain consists of a nearly circular intrusion of syenite, 8 km in diameter.
