= Changara District =

Coordinates: 16.837°S 33.310°E

Changara
- District
- Changara District on the map of Mozambique
- Country: Mozambique
- Province: Tete
- Capital: Luenha

Area
  - Total: 8,660 km^{2} (3,340 sq mi)

Population (2007 census)
  - Total: 156,738
  - Density: 18.1/km^{2} (46.9/sq mi)

Changara District is a district of Tete Province in western Mozambique. The principal town is Luenha. The district is located in the south of the province, and borders with Chiuta District in the north, Moatize District in the east, Guro District of Manica Province in the south, Zimbabwe in the southwest, and with Cahora-Bassa District in the west. The area of the district is 8,660 square kilometres (3,340 mi^{2}). It has a population of 156,738 as of 2007.

== Geography ==
The district is located at the right bank of the Zambezi.

According to the Köppen climate classification, the climate of the district is tropical dry (BSw). The average rainfall in the district is unknown; the average annual rainfall in Tete, which is the closest meteorological station to the district, is 644 millimetres (25.4 in).

== Demographics ==
As of 2005, 51% of the population of the district was younger than 15 years. 29% of the population spoke Portuguese. The most common mothertongue among the population was Cinyungwe. 72% were analphabetic, mostly women.

== Administrative divisions ==
The district is divided into three postos, Luenha (three localities), Chioco (three localities), and Mavara (three localities).

== Economy ==
Less than 1% of the households in the district have access to electricity.

=== Agriculture ===
In the district, there are 29,000 farms which have on average 1.0 hectare (0.0039 mi^{2}) of land. The main agricultural products are corn, cassava, cowpea, peanut, and sweet potato.

=== Transportation ===
There is a road network in the district which is 482 kilometres (300 mi) long and includes a 120 kilometres (75 mi) stretch of the national road EN103.
