= Guija =

Guija can refer to:

- Lake Güija on the border between Guatemala and El Salvador.
- Guijá District in Gaza Province, Mozambique.
