= Marávia District =

Coordinates: 15°09′35″S 31°53′33″E

Marávia
- District
- Marávia District on the map of Mozambique
- Country: Mozambique
- Province: Tete
- Capital: Fingoé

Area
  - Total: 17,108 km^{2} (6,605 sq mi)

Population (2007 census)
  - Total: 82,789
  - Density: 4.8392/km^{2} (12.533/sq mi)

Marávia District is a district of Tete Province in western Mozambique. Its administrative center is the town of Fingoé. The district is located in the northwest of the province, and borders with Zambia in the north, Chifunde District in the east, Chiuta District in the southeast, Cahora-Bassa District in the south, Magoé District in the southwest, and with Zumbo District in the west. The area of the district is 17,108 square kilometres (6,605 mi^{2}). It has a population of 82,789 as of 2007.

== Geography ==
The Zambezi makes the border of the district with Magoé and Cahora-Bassa Districts. All major rivers in the district belong to the drainage basin of the Zambezi. They include the Capoche River, the Unkanha River, the Luatize River, the Duanga River, and the Mucumbudzi River.

According to the Köppen climate classification, the climate of the district is tropical wet and dry (Cw), with the average annual rainfall of 1,058 millimetres (41.7 in).

== Demographics ==
As of 2005, 50% of the population of the district was younger than 15 years. 9% of the population spoke Portuguese. The most common mothertongue among the population was Cinyungwe. 88% were analphabetic, mostly women.

== Administrative divisions ==
The district is divided into four postos, Chiputo (three localities), Fingoé (three localities), Molowera (three localities), and Chipera (four localities).

== Economy ==
Less than 1% of the households in the district have access to electricity.

=== Agriculture ===
In the district, there are 13,000 farms which have on average 1.0 hectare (0.0039 mi^{2}) of land. The main agricultural products are corn, cassava, cowpea, peanut, and sweet potato.

=== Transportation ===
There is a road network in the district which is 604 kilometres (375 mi) long and includes a 110 kilometres (68 mi) stretch of the national road EN221.
