= José Gil =

José Gil may refer to:

- José Gil de Castro (1785 – c. 1840), Peruvian portrait painter, cartographer and soldier
- José Gil Fortoul (1861–1943), Venezuelan writer and politician, briefly acting president
- José María Gil-Robles (1935–2023), Spanish lawyer and politician, president of the European Parliament
- José Gil (philosopher) (born 1939), Portuguese philosopher
- José Luis Gil (born 1957), Spanish actor
- José Gil Gordillo (born 1960), Spanish footballer
- José Miguel Gil (born 1971), Spanish diver
- José Gil Solé (1929–2000), Spanish racing cyclist
