= Lago District =

Coordinates: 12°42′S 34°49′E

Lago district in Mozambique

Lago District is a district of Niassa Province in north-western Mozambique. The principal town is Metangula. Lago District is bordered to the west by Lake Nyasa, on the south by Lichinga, on the east by Sanga District. Lago shares its northern boundary with Tanzania.

- Area: 6,438 km^{2}.
- Population: 55, 892 (1997 census)
- Population density: 8.7 people/km^{2} (1997)

== Settlements ==
- Lupilichi
- Chicago
