= Marromeu District =

Coordinates: 18°17′27″S 35°56′43″E

Marromeu
- District
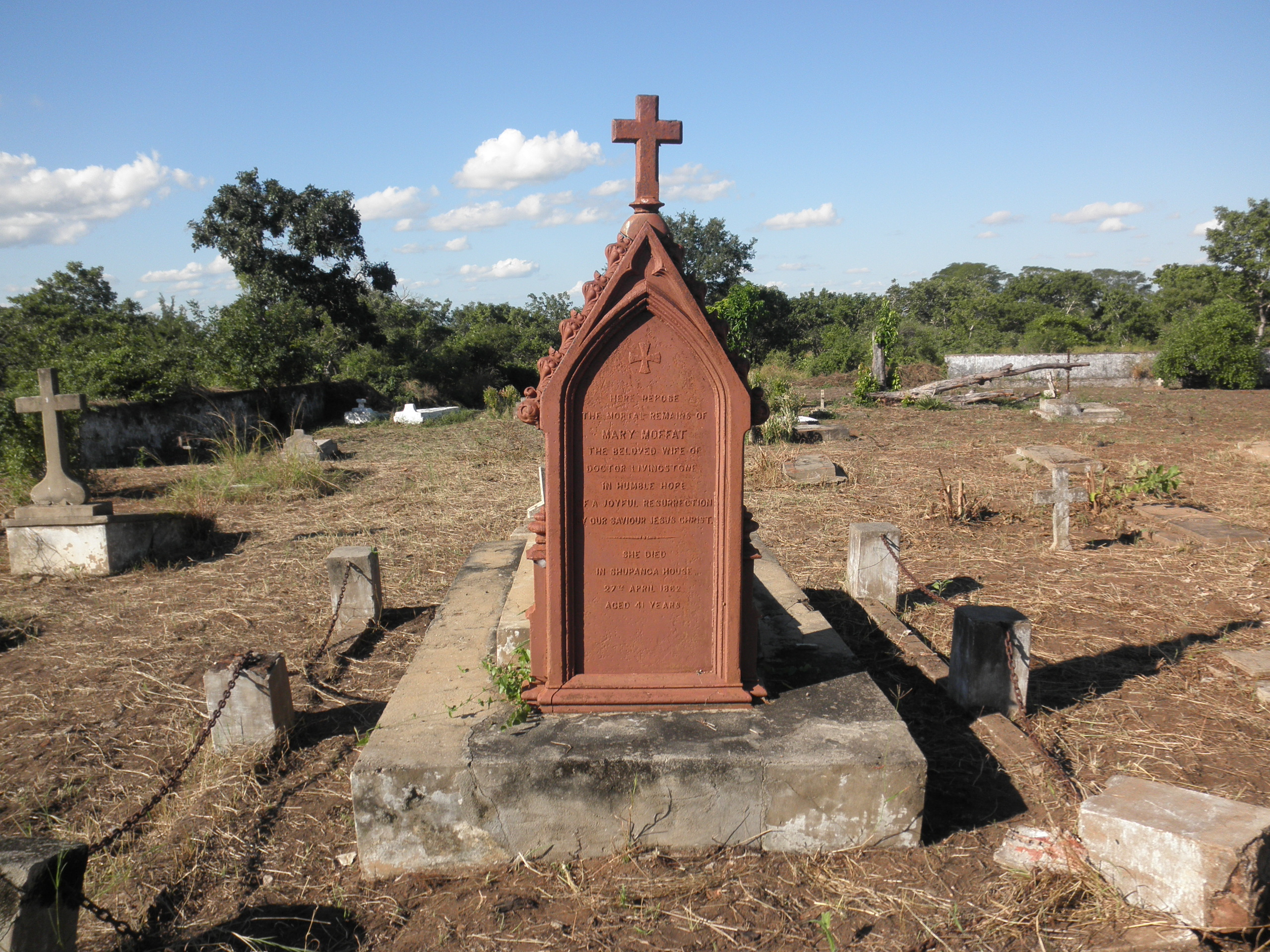
- The gravestone of Mary Livingstone in Chupanga

- Marromeu District on the map of Mozambique
- Country: Mozambique
- Province: Sofala
- Capital: Marromeu

Area
  - Total: 5,871 km^{2} (2,267 sq mi)

Population (2007 census)
  - Total: 119,718
  - Density: 20.39/km^{2} (52.81/sq mi)

Marromeu District is a district of Sofala Province in Mozambique. The principal town is Marromeu. The district is located in the northeast of the province, and borders with Chinde and Mopeia Districts of Zambezia Province in the north, Cheringoma District in the south and in the west, and with Caia District in the northwest. In the southeast, the district is limited by the Indian Ocean. The area of the district is 5,871 square kilometres (2,267 mi^{2}). It has a population of 119,718 as of 2007.

== Geography ==
The principal river of the district is the Zambezi, which separates it from Zambezia Province. Most of the rivers in the district are left tributaries of the Zambezi, and a large part of the Zambezi Delta lies within the district.

The climate of the district is tropical humid, with the average annual rainfall being 910 millimetres (36 in).

== History ==
The population of the area before Portuguese colonization consisted mostly of nomadic Phozo peoples who were frequently in war with each other.

== Demographics ==
As of 2005, 46% of the population of the district was younger than 15 years. 31% of the population spoke Portuguese. The most common mothertongue among the population was Cindau. 77% were analphabetic, mostly women.

== Administrative divisions ==
The district is divided into two postos, Chupanga and Marromeu, which comprise in total five localities.

== Economy ==
Less than 1% of the households in the district have access to electricity.

=== Agriculture ===
In the district, there are 15,000 farms which have on average 0.9 hectares (0.0035 mi^{2}) of land. The main agricultural products are corn, cassava, cowpea, peanut, pearl millet, sorghum, and sweet potato.

=== Transportation ===
There is a road network in the district which is 282 kilometres (175 mi) long.
