= Guro District, Manica Province =

Coordinates: 17.425°S 33.356°E

Guro
- District
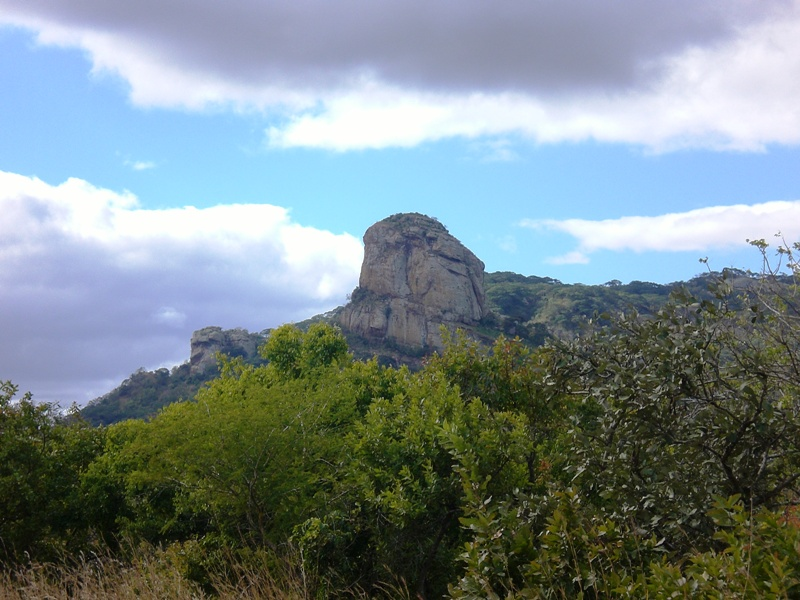
- Mount Calinga-Muci

- Guro District on the map of Mozambique
- Country: Mozambique
- Province: Manica
- Capital: Guro

Area
  - Total: 6,928 km^{2} (2,675 sq mi)

Population (2007 census)
  - Total: 68,526
  - Density: 9.891/km^{2} (25.62/sq mi)

Guro District is a district of Manica Province in western Mozambique. The principal town is Guro. The district is located in the north of the province, and borders with Changara District of Tete Province in the north, Tambara District in the east, Macossa District in the south, and Báruè District in the southwest. The area of the district is 6,928 square kilometres (2,675 mi^{2}). It had a population of 68,526 as of 2007 and 83,972 as of 2013

== Geography ==
The major rivers on the borders of the district (the Luenha and Zambezi) have perennial flow, while others are intermittent (Nhamacombe, Mupha, Nhaduzi), fed by stormwaters.

The climate of the district is semi-arid with most rain falling from November to March. The average annual rainfall is 632 millimetres (24.9 in).

== Demographics ==
As of 2005, 51% of the population of the district was younger than 15 years. 22% did speak Portuguese. The most common mothertongue is Chitwe language. 79% were analphabetic, mostly women.

== Administrative divisions ==
The district is divided into four postos, Guro (one locality), Dacata (one locality), Mandie (five localities), and Nhamassonge (one locality).

== Economy ==
Less than 1% of the households in the district have access to electricity.

=== Agriculture ===
In the district, there are 10,000 farms which have on average 2.5 hectares (0.0097 mi^{2}) of land. The main agricultural products are corn, cassava, cowpea, peanuts, sorghum, pearl millet, and sweet potato. Livelihoods are dominated by smallholder agriculture, with millet and sorghum in well-drained soils, and maize and black-eyed peas in more humid areas. Irregularity of rain is a major constraint on the district.

=== Transportation ===
There is a road network in the district which is 576 kilometres (358 mi) long. Most of the roads are in a bad state.
