= Cahora-Bassa District =

Coordinates: 15.587°S 32.857°E

Cahora-Bassa
- District
- Cahora-Bassa District on the map of Mozambique
- Country: Mozambique
- Province: Tete
- Capital: Chitima

Area
  - Total: 8,712 km^{2} (3,364 sq mi)

Population (2007 census)
  - Total: 89,956
  - Density: 10.33/km^{2} (26.74/sq mi)

Cahora-Bassa District is a district of Tete Province in western Mozambique. Its administrative center is the town of Chitima. The district is located in the southwest of the province, and borders Marávia District in the north, Chiuta District in the northeast, Changara District in the east, Zimbabwe in the south, and Magoé District in the west. The area of the district is 8,712 square kilometres (3,364 mi^{2}). It has a population of 89,956 as of 2007.

== Geography ==
The district is located at the right bank of the Zambezi, with the Chirodze River, the Daque River, the Messanângua River, and the Sacoke River being the other principal rivers in the district.

The climate is predominantly hot semi-arid modified locally by altitude, with two distinct seasons, the rainy season (very short) and the dry season (very long). The average annual precipitation is about 635 mm, while annual potential evapotranspiration is about 1623 mm. Most rainfall occurs mainly in the period between December and February, varying significantly in quantity and distribution from year to year. The average annual temperature is 26 °C.

== Demographics ==
As of 2005, 48% of the population of the district was younger than 15 years. 79% of the population was rural. 40% of the population spoke Portuguese. The most common mothertongue among the population was Cinyungwe. 64% were analphabetic, mostly women.

== Administrative divisions ==
The district is divided into three postos, Songo (two localities), Chitholo (two localities), and Chitima (five localities).

== Economy ==
9% of the households in the district have access to electricity.

=== Agriculture ===
In the district, there are 12,000 farms which have on average 1.0 hectare (0.0039 mi^{2}) of land. The main agricultural products are corn, cassava, cowpea, peanut, and sweet potato.

=== Transportation ===
There is a road network in the district which is 576 kilometres (358 mi) long.
