= Mabalane District =

Coordinates: 23.849°S 32.621°E

Mabalane
- District
- Mabalane District on the map of Mozambique
- Country: Mozambique
- Province: Gaza
- Capital: Mabalane

Area
  - Total: 9,107 km^{2} (3,516 sq mi)

Population (2007 census)
  - Total: 32,040
  - Density: 3.518/km^{2} (9.112/sq mi)

Mabalane District is a district of Gaza Province in south-western Mozambique. The administrative center of the district is Mabalane. The district is located at the center of the province, and borders with Chicualacuala District in the north, Chigubo District in the east, Guijá District in the southeast, Chókwè District in the south, and with Massingir District in the west. The area of the district is 9,107 square kilometres (3,516 mi^{2}). It has a population of 32,040 (2007).

== Geography ==
The whole district belongs to the drainage basin of the Limpopo, and the Limpopo River flows through the district. Other big rivers in the district are the Chigombi River, the Sungutanu River, and the Chichakware River.

The climate is tropical arid, with the annual rainfall averaging to 500 millimetres (20 in).

Banhine National Park, part of Great Limpopo Transfrontier Park, is shared between Chigubo, Chicualacuala, and Mabalane Districts. The area of the park within Mabalane District is 1,600 square kilometres (620 mi^{2}). Limpopo National Park, also part of Great Limpopo Transfrontier Park, is shared between Massingir, Chicualacuala, and Mabalane Districts. The area of the park within Mabalane District is 1,500 square kilometres (580 mi^{2}).

== History ==
In 1957, the Portuguese colonial administration established a posto which got the name of Mabalane. The administrative center of the posto was at the railway station of Pinto Teixeira, and a jail was constructed next to the station. After the independence, Pinto Teixeira was renamed Mabalane.

== Demographics ==
As of 2005, 44% of the population of the district was younger than 15 years. 14% of the population spoke Portuguese. The most common mothertongue among the population was Tsonga. 71% were analphabetic, mostly women.

== Administrative divisions ==
The district is divided into three postos, Mabalane (three localities), Combomune (two localities), and Ntlavenhe (two localities).

== Economy ==
Less than 1% of the households in the district have access to electricity.

=== Agriculture ===
In the district, there are 5,000 farms which have on average 4.1 hectares (0.016 mi^{2}) of land. The main agricultural products are corn, cassava, cowpea, peanut, sweet potato, and rice.

=== Transportation ===
There is a road network in the district which includes 134 kilometres (83 mi) of national roads (Malabane to Chokwe and to Chicualacuala) and 542 kilometres (337 mi) of secondary roads. The Limpopo Railroad (Southern System) runs through the district.
