= Chupanga =

Village in central Mozambique

Coordinates: 18°02′22″S 35°36′38″E

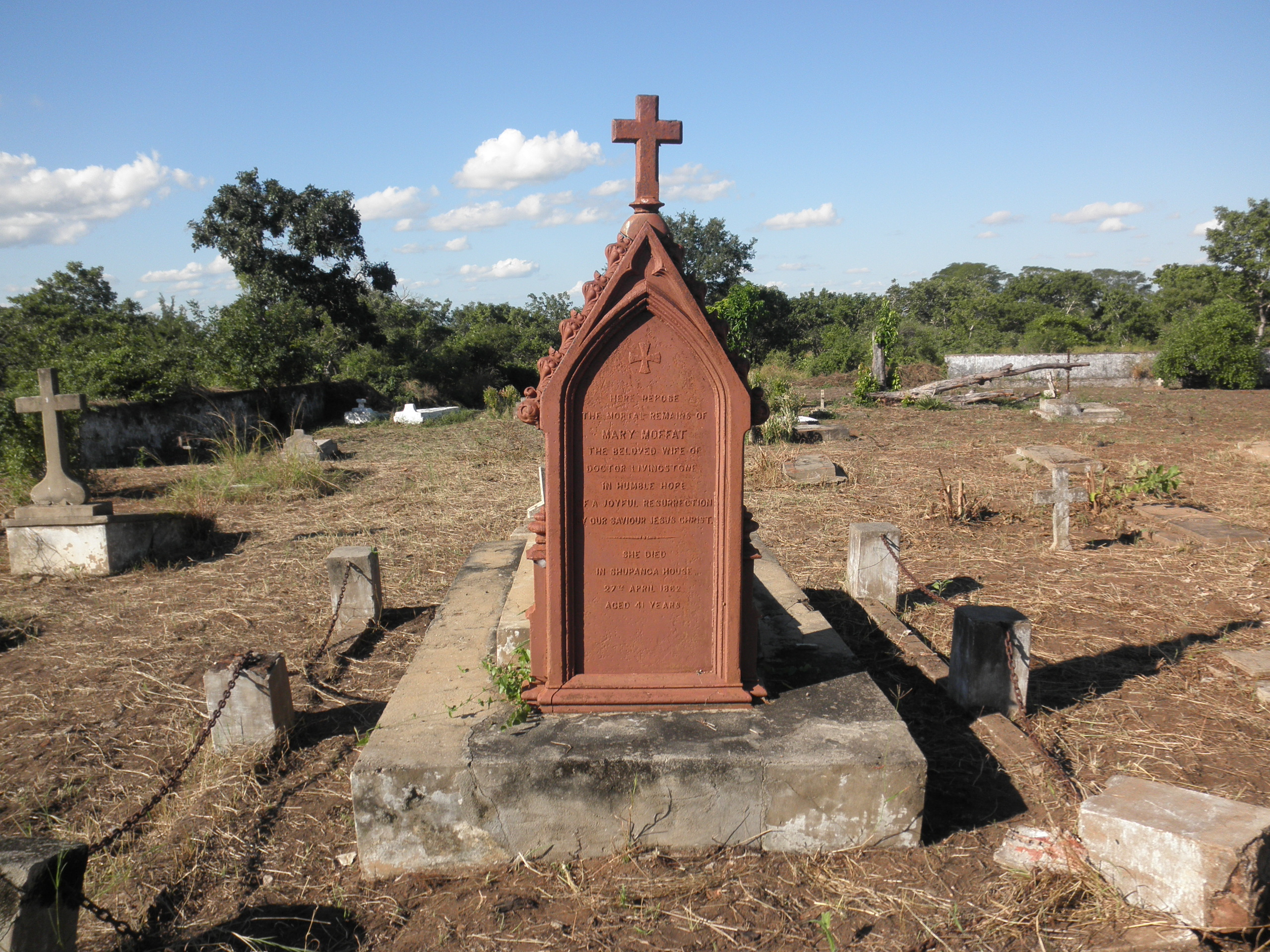
The gravestone of Mary Moffat Livingstone, the wife of the explorer David Livingstone, in Chupanga

Chupanga, formerly Shupanga, also known as Lacerdónia, is a village in Marromeu District, Sofala Province, Mozambique, located on the right bank of Zambezi River. It is the administrative center of one of the two postos which constitute Marromeu District. There are strata of grey and yellow sandstone, along with limestone, located nearby.

The village of Shupanga was founded before the arrival of Europeans. It was visited by the Second Zambezi expedition of David Livingstone. The wife of Livingstone, Mary, died in Shupanga of malaria.

Chupanga is located on Road N219, which connects it with Marromeu to the east and provides access to the EN1 road to the west. It is connected by an unpaved road R1002 with Inhamitanga.
