= Chifunde District =

Coordinates: 14.792°S 32.829°E

Chifunde
- District
- Chifunde District on the map of Mozambique
- Country: Mozambique
- Province: Tete
- Capital: Chifunde

Area
  - Total: 9,403 km^{2} (3,631 sq mi)

Population (2007 census)
  - Total: 101,811
  - Density: 10.83/km^{2} (28.04/sq mi)

Chifunde District is a district of Tete Province in western Mozambique. The principal town is Chifunde. The district is located in the north of the province, and borders with Zambia in the north, Malawi in the northeast, Macanga District in the east, Chiuta District in the south, and with Marávia District in the west. The area of the district is 9,403 square kilometres (3,631 mi^{2}). It has a population of 101,811 as of 2007.

== Geography ==
The Kapoche River makes the eastern border of the district, and the Luangua River makes its western border. Both are major left tributaries of the Zambezi.

The climate of the district is tropical wet and dry, with the average annual rainfall being between 800 millimetres (31 in) and 1,400 millimetres (55 in).

== Demographics ==
As of 2005, 49% of the population of the district was younger than 15 years. 7% of the population spoke Portuguese. The most common mothertongue among the population was Cinyungwe. 88% were analphabetic, mostly women.

== Administrative divisions ==
The district is divided into three postos, Chifunde (three localities), Mualadzi (two localities), and N'sadzo (two localities).

== Economy ==
Less than 1% of the households in the district have access to electricity.

=== Agriculture ===
In the district, there are 13,000 farms which have on average 2.0 hectares (0.0077 mi^{2}) of land. The main agricultural products are corn, cassava, cowpea, peanut, tobacco, and sweet potato.

=== Transportation ===
There is a road network in the district which is 312 kilometres (194 mi) long and includes a 129 kilometres (80 mi) stretch of the national road EN548 and 10 kilometres (6.2 mi) stretch of the national road EN221.
