= José Gil (philosopher) =

Portuguese philosopher (born 1939)

José Gil (born 15 June 1939 Muecate, Portuguese Mozambique) is a Portuguese philosopher.

In his youth he lived in Lisbon, Portugal, but his experiences under António Salazar's 1933-1974 dictatorship, made him decide to study in a free country. He moved to Paris, France where in 1982 he got his PhD from the University of Paris (Université de Vincennes à Saint-Denis) where he researched on the body as a power field under the supervision of François Châtelet. There he attended Gilles Deleuze's classes whose influence on his thinking was decisive.

Between 1986 and 1989 he conducted an original research project on the aesthetics of Fernando Pessoa, at the Collège International de Philosophie, where he directed a program.

He wrote several books prior to 1983 but when "Portugal, Today: Fear of Existing" (Portugal, Hoje: O Medo de Existir, Lisboa: Relógio d'Água) was published in November 2004, there was a massive response. The book describes, in a way considered by some to be very accurate, what is to be Portuguese and how Portuguese people perceive themselves, other people and the world, thus helping to establish what it is to be "Portuguese" and related identities. The fact that the book was a success enabled the Portuguese to share a public awareness of the problem which may be relevant to helping to solve it.

The following month, December 2004, Le Nouvel Observateur named him one of the 25 Great Thinkers of the contemporary world along with Richard Rorty, Peter Sloterdijk, Toni Negri and Slavoj Žižek.

For several years he has taught courses on aesthetics, Deleuze and Spinoza at Universidade Nova de Lisboa, Department of Philosophy. He also writes for several Portuguese and foreign magazines. The academic year 2008/ 2009 brought his teaching career to an end.

In 2008 he has published two books: one on Deleuze's philosophy (The Imperceptible Becoming of Immanence/ O Imperceptível Devir da Imanência, Lisboa: Relógio d'Água); and a second one, a fictional work, "At noon, the birds" (ao meio-dia, os pássaros, Lisboa: Relógio d'Água).

== Works ==
- 1983: La Crucifiée, Éditions de la Différence.
- 1983: Un'Antropologia delle Forze, Einaudi.
- 1984: La Corse, entre la liberté et la terreur – Étude sur la dynamique des systèmes politiques corses, Éditions de la Différence (2.ª edição: 1991).
- 1985: Métamorphoses du corps, Éditions de la Différence. [As Metamorfoses do corpo, 1980.]
- 1986: A Crucificada, Relógio d'Água.
- 1987: Fernando Pessoa ou a Metafisica das Sensações, Relógio d'Água.
- 1988: Fernando Pessoa ou la métaphysique des sensations, Éditions de la Différence.
- 1988: Corpo, Espaço e Poder, Litoral Edições.
- 1990: Cemitério dos Desejos, Relógio d'Água.
- 1990: Cimetière des Plaisirs, Éditions de la Différence.
- 1994: O Espaço Interior, Presença.
- 1994: Os Monstros, Quetzal.
- 1995: Salazar: a Retórica da Invisibilidade, Relógio d'Água.
- 1996: A Imagem-Nua e as Pequenas Percepções, Relógio d'Água.
- 1997: Metamorfoses do Corpo, Relógio d'Água.
- Gil, José (1998). Metamorphoses of the Body. Minneapolis: University of Minnesota Press. ISBN 978-0-8166-2683-0.
- 1999: Diferença e Negação na Poesia de Fernando Pessoa, Relógio d'Água.
- 2001: Movimento Total – O Corpo e a Dança, Relógio d'Água.
- 2003: A Profundidade e a Superfície – Ensaio sobre o Principezinho de Saint-Exupéry, Relógio d'Água.
- 2004: Portugal, Hoje: O Medo de Existir, Relógio d'Água, Lisboa, Novembro de 2004.
- 2005: Sem Título – Escritos sobre Arte e Artistas, Relógio d'Água.

== Sources ==
- http://www.relogiodagua.pt/
