= Metarica District =

District in Mozambique

Coordinates: 14.328°S 36.803°E

Metarica district in Mozambique

Metarica District is a district of Niassa Province in north-western Mozambique. The principal town is Metarica.
