= Chicualacuala District =

Coordinates: 22°05′S 31°41′E

Chicualacuala
- District
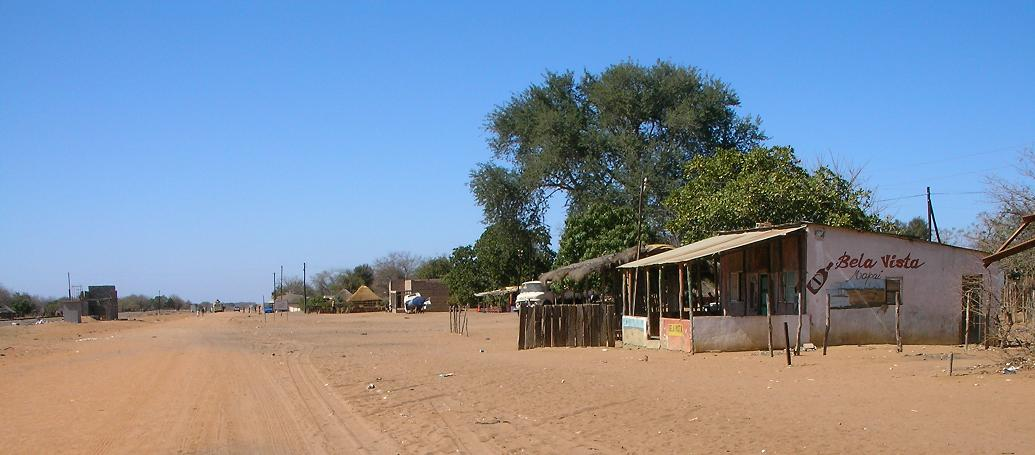
- Mapai

- Chicualacuala District on the map of Mozambique
- Country: Mozambique
- Province: Gaza
- Capital: Chicualacuala

Area
  - Total: 18,155 km^{2} (7,010 sq mi)

Population (2011)
  - Total: 41,638
  - Density: 2.2935/km^{2} (5.9401/sq mi)

Chicualacuala District (Portuguese: Distrito de Chicualacuala) is a district of Gaza Province in south-western Mozambique. It has a population of 41,638 (2011) and covers 18,155 square kilometres (7,010 mi^{2}). The population density of Chicualacuala District 2.1 residents per square kilometers, significantly lower than the average of 17.5 in Gaza Province.

The district seat is the town of Chicualacuala.

Chicuacuala District is bordered to the north by the Massangena District, to the east by Chigubo District, to the southwest by Mabalane District, to the south by Massingir District, to the southwest by South Africa, and to the northwest by Zimbabwe. It is home to several villages along the Limpopo River including Dumela, Mbuzi, Kunguma, Mawene, Xicumba, Xicumbane, Ngala, Panhame, Mabuzane, and Xitshutswini.

Chicuacuala District has four health centers; the single hospital in the province is located outside the district. The district also lacks a bank.

== Geography ==
The whole district belongs to the drainage basin of the Limpopo, and the Limpopo River flows through the district. Other big rivers in the district are the Nuanetzi River, the Chefu River, the Munene River, and the Singuédzi River. The latter makes the border with Massingir District.

The climate is tropical arid and semi-arid, with the annual rainfall varying between 500 millimetres (20 in) and 800 millimetres (31 in).

Banhine National Park, part of Great Limpopo Transfrontier Park, is shared between Chigubo, Chicualacuala, and Mabalane Districts. The area of the park within Chicualacuala District is 2,400 square kilometres (930 mi^{2}). Limpopo National Park, also part of Great Limpopo Transfrontier Park, is shared between Massingir, Chicualacuala, and Mabalane Districts. The area of the park within Chicualacuala District is 6,400 square kilometres (2,500 mi^{2}).

== Demographics ==
As of 2005, 47% of the population of the district was younger than 15 years. 25% of the population spoke Portuguese. The most common mothertongue among the population was Tsonga. 69% were analphabetic, mostly women.

== Administrative divisions ==
The district is divided into three postos, Chicualacuala (three localities), Mapai (four localities), and Pafuri (two localities).

- Chicualacuala:
  - Vila Eduardo Mondlane
  - Chicualacuala B
  - Litlatlha
  - Mahatlane
- Mapai:
  - Chidulo
  - 16 de Junho
  - M'Ponze
  - Mapai-Rio
- Pafuri:
  - Mbuzi
  - Mungumbane

== Economy ==
=== Agriculture ===
In the district, there are 6,000 farms, with 60% exploiting less than 2 hectares (0.0077 mi^{2}) of land. The main agricultural products are corn, cassava, cowpea, peanut, and sweet potato. Population of cattle, pigs, sheep, and goats was steadily growing prior to 2005.

=== Transportation ===
There is a road network in the district which includes a stretch of the national road EN340 to Chokwe, as well as 268 kilometres (167 mi) of secondary roads. The Limpopo Railroad (Southern System) runs through the district.
