= Namuno District =

Coordinates: 13.621°S 38.819°E

- District
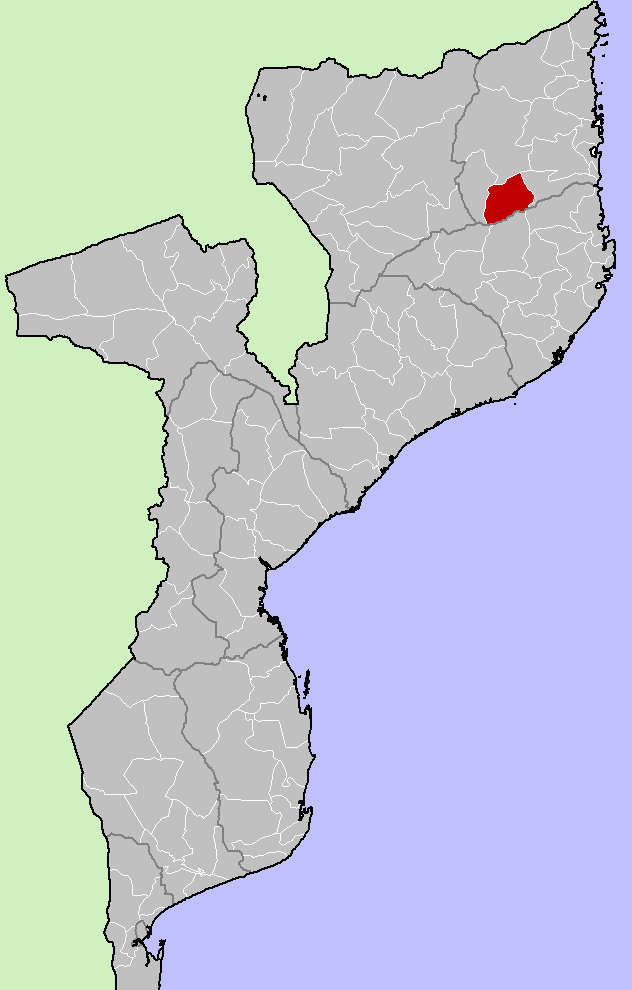
- District location in Mozambique
- Country: Mozambique
- Province: Cabo Delgado Province
- Capital: Namuno

Area
  - Total: 6,037 km^{2} (2,331 sq mi)

Population (2015)
  - Total: 211,737
  - Density: 35.07/km^{2} (90.84/sq mi)
- Time zone: UTC+3 (EAT)

Namuno District is a district of Cabo Delgado Province in northern Mozambique. It covers 6,037 km^{2} with 211,737 inhabitants (2015).
