= Gilé District =

Coordinates: 16.147°S 38.371°E

Gilé District is a district of Zambezia Province in Mozambique.
