= Estamos =

Non-profit organization in Mozambique

- Type: Nonprofit
- Location: Lichinga, Niassa Province, Mozambique

Estamos is a Mozambican non-profit organization. Headquartered in Lichinga, Niassa Province, it is principally involved in promoting HIV/AIDS awareness, nutrition and water sanitation practices.
