= Mecubúri District =

Coordinates: 14.657°S 38.891°E

Mecubúri district in Mozambique

Mecubúri District is a district of Nampula Province in north-eastern Mozambique. The principal town is Mecubúri.
