= N'gauma District =

District in Niassa, Mozambique

N'gauma district in Mozambique

N'gauma District is a district of Niassa Province in north-western Mozambique. The principal town is Massangulo. Other notable towns include Ngaúma and Itepela. The main people group in the area are the Yawo people. N'gauma is largely made up of farm land with multiple large clusters of mountains.
