= Muembe District =

Coordinates: 13.087°S 35.643°E

Muembe District is a district of Niassa Province in north-western Mozambique. The principal town is Muembe.
