= Chemba District =

Coordinates: 17.163°S 34.894°E

Chemba
- District
- Chemba District on the map of Mozambique
- Country: Mozambique
- Province: Sofala
- Capital: Chemba

Area
  - Total: 3,998 km^{2} (1,544 sq mi)

Population (2007 census)
  - Total: 65,107
  - Density: 16.28/km^{2} (42.18/sq mi)

Chemba District is a district of Sofala Province in Mozambique. The principal town is Chemba. The district is located in the north of the province, and borders with Tete Province in the northeast, Caia District in the southeast, Maringué District in the southwest, and with Tambara District of Manica Province in the northwest. The area of the district is 3,998 square kilometres (1,544 mi^{2}). It has a population of 65,107 as of 2007.

== Geography ==
The district is located at the right bank of the Zambezi.

The climate of the district is tropical semi-arid at the bank of the Zambezi and tropical dry in the interior. The average annual rainfall at the bank of the Zambezi is 715 millimetres (28.1 in); in the interior of the district it is 650 millimetres (26 in).

== History ==
The name Chemba as the designation of the area appeared in the colonial times, its origin is unclear.

== Demographics ==
As of 2005, 48% of the population of the district was younger than 15 years. 13% of the population spoke Portuguese. The most common mothertongue among the population was Cindau. 88% were analphabetic, mostly women.

== Administrative divisions ==
The district is divided into three postos, Chemba (two localities), Chiramba (two localities), and Mulima (two localities).

== Economy ==
Less than 1% of the households in the district have access to electricity.

=== Agriculture ===
In the district, there are 10,000 farms which have on average 2.6 hectares (0.010 mi^{2}) of land. The main agricultural products are corn, cassava, cowpea, peanut, pearl millet, sorghum, and sweet potato.

=== Transportation ===
There is a road network in the district which is 324 kilometres (201 mi) long.

There is semi-public transportation between Chemba and Beira.
