= Mugeba =

Mugeba Monghebbo
- Village
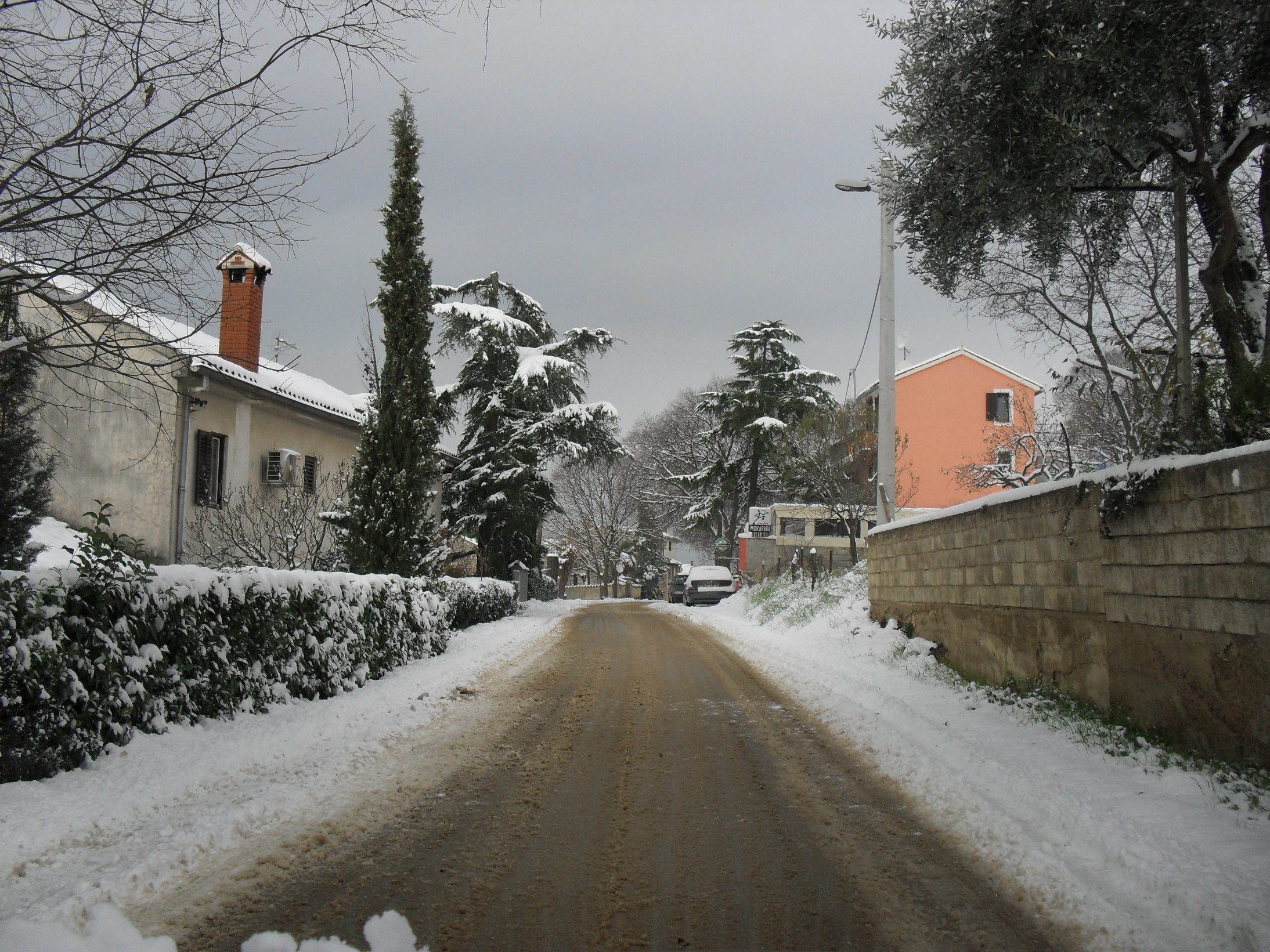

- Location within Croatia
- Coordinates: 45.1984408°N 13.6076698°E
- Country: Croatia
- County: Istria County
- Municipality: Poreč

Area
  - Total: 2.4 sq mi (6.3 km^{2})

Population (2021)
  - Total: 219
  - Density: 90/sq mi (35/km^{2})
- Time zone: UTC+1 (CET)
  - Summer (DST): UTC+2 (CEST)
- Postal code: 52440 Poreč
- Area code: 052

Mugeba (Italian: Monghebbo) is a village in the municipality of Poreč-Parenzo, Istria in Croatia.

== Demographics ==
According to the 2021 census, its population was 219.
