= Nipepe District =

Coordinates: 14.030°S 37.856°E

Nipepe District is a district of Niassa Province in north-western Mozambique. The principal town is Nipepe.
