= Mabalane =

- Location within Mozambique
- Coordinates: 23°38′0″S 32°31′0″E
- Country: Mozambique
- Provinces: Maputo Province
- District: Moamba District

Mabalane is a town in Mozambique located on the Limpopo River. There was a prison camp and garrison at Mabalane during the revolution.

Mabalane was affected by the floods that affected Mabalane District in February 1996. The flooding of the Limpopo saw the town and 12 villages partly submerged causing serious damage.

Before independence, it was known as Vila Pinto Teixeira in honor of Francisco dos Santos Pinto Teixeira (1887–1983), Portuguese military engineer, who was director of Port, Railway and Transport Services of the Colony of Mozambique, and former Mayor of Lourenço Marques (now Maputo).

== Transport ==
It is served by a station on the southern main line of Mozambique Railways.

== See also ==
- Transport in Mozambique
