= Cuamba District =

Northwestern Mozambican district

Coordinates: 14°49′S 36°33′E

Localization of Cuamba district in Mozambique

Cuamba District is a district of Niassa Province in north-western Mozambique. The principal town is Cuamba.

As of 2021, the population of the district is 326,575 inhabitants.
