= Machava =

Machava is a surname of Mozambican origin. Notable people with the surname include:

- Creve Armando Machava (born 1996), Mozambican athlete
- Maria Machava (born 2004), Mozambican sailor
- Paulo Machava (1954/5–2015), Mozambican journalist
