= Sam Zandamela =

South African politician

Sam Zandamela MPL

Member of the Mpumalanga Provincial Legislature
- Incumbent
- Assumed office 30 August 2022
- Preceded by: Gcina Mofokeng
- In office 11 July 2018 – 7 May 2019

Permanent delegate to the National Council of Provinces from Mpumalanga
- In office 23 May 2019 – 30 August 2022

Deputy Provincial Chairperson of the Economic Freedom Fighters
- Incumbent
- Assumed office September 2018
- Preceded by: Japhta Mashilo

Personal details
- Born: Sam Zandemela
- Party: Economic Freedom Fighters
- Profession: Politician

Sam Zandamela is a South African politician from Mpumalanga who has served as a member of the Mpumalanga Provincial Legislature since August 2022, and previously from July 2018 to May 2019. A member of the Economic Freedom Fighters party, he previously served as the party's deputy provincial chairperson. Zandamela served as a permanent delegate to the National Council of Provinces from May 2019 until August 2022.

== Career ==
Zandamela joined the Economic Freedom Fighters in 2013. He served as a councillor in the Emalahleni Local Municipality before his appointment to the provincial legislature in July 2018. He replaced Alfred Sikhosana. In September 2018, he was elected deputy provincial chairperson of the party, succeeding Japhta Mashilo. Zandamela was an MPL until the dissolution of the legislature's term on 7 May 2019.

== Parliamentary career ==
Following the general election on 8 May 2019, the provincial legislature appointed him as a permanent delegate to the National Council of Provinces on 22 May 2019. He was sworn into office on 23 May 2019.

=== Committee assignments ===
- Select Committee on Cooperative Governance and Traditional Affairs, Water and Sanitation and Human Settlements
- Select Committee on Security and Justice
- Select Committee on Petitions and Executive Undertakings
- Select Committee on Transport, Public Service and Administration, Public Works and Infrastructure (Alternate member)
- Select Committee on Trade and Industry, Economic Development, Small Business Development, Tourism, Employment and Labour (Alternate member)

== Return to the Provincial Legislature ==
On 30 August 2022, Zandamela resigned from the NCOP and was sworn in as a member of the Mpumalanga Provincial Legislature. He filled the vacancy created by the resignation by former party member Gcina Mofokeng.

At the EFF's third Provincial People's Assembly in September 2022, Rhulani Xebi was elected to succeed Zandamela as the deputy provincial chairperson of the party.
