= Eráti District =

Coordinates: 14.05°S 39.45°E

Eráti District is a district of Nampula Province in north-eastern Mozambique. The principal town is Eráti.

Eráti district in Mozambique
