= Milange =

Coordinates: 16°06′S 35°46′E

Milange is a town in Zambezia Province of Mozambique. It is the district center of Milange District.

Milange lies just south of the Ruo River, which forms the border between Mozambique and Malawi. Mount Tumbine rises immediately east of the town, and the Mulanje Massif is to the north in Malawi.
