= Chitunda =

- Location in Angola
- Coordinates: 11°45′59″S 14°11′1″E
- Country: Angola
- Province: Cuanza Sul Province
- Elevation: 1,008 m (3,307 ft)
- Time zone: UTC+1 (West Africa Time)

Chitunda or Cotunda is a populated place in western Angola. The following table is a climate table average for Chitunda:

Climate data for Chitunda, Angola
Month	Jan	Feb	Mar	Apr	May	Jun	Jul	Aug	Sep	Oct	Nov	Dec	Year
Mean daily maximum °C (°F)	25 (77)	26 (79)	26 (79)	26 (79)	27 (81)	28 (82)	29 (84)	32 (90)	32 (90)	30 (86)	26 (79)	24 (75)	28 (82)
Mean daily minimum °C (°F)	15 (59)	15 (59)	15 (59)	15 (59)	14 (57)	12 (54)	13 (55)	15 (59)	17 (63)	17 (63)	16 (61)	15 (59)	15 (59)
Average precipitation mm (inches)	215 (8.5)	219 (8.6)	324 (12.8)	258 (10.2)	28 (1.1)	0 (0)	0 (0)	2 (0.1)	62 (2.4)	303 (11.9)	430 (16.9)	312 (12.3)	2,153 (84.8)
Source: World Weather Online
