= Maúa District =

Coordinates: 13.872°S 37.165°E

Maúa district in Mozambique

Maúa District is a district of Niassa Province in north-western Mozambique. The principal town is Maúa.

- Area: 7,976 km^{2}.
- Population (est. 2005): 52,852
