= Lalaua District =

District of Nampula Province, Mozambique

Coordinates: 14.393°S 38.268°E

Lalaua district in Mozambique

Lalaua District is a district of Nampula Province in north-eastern Mozambique. The principal town is Lalaua.
