= Mocuba =

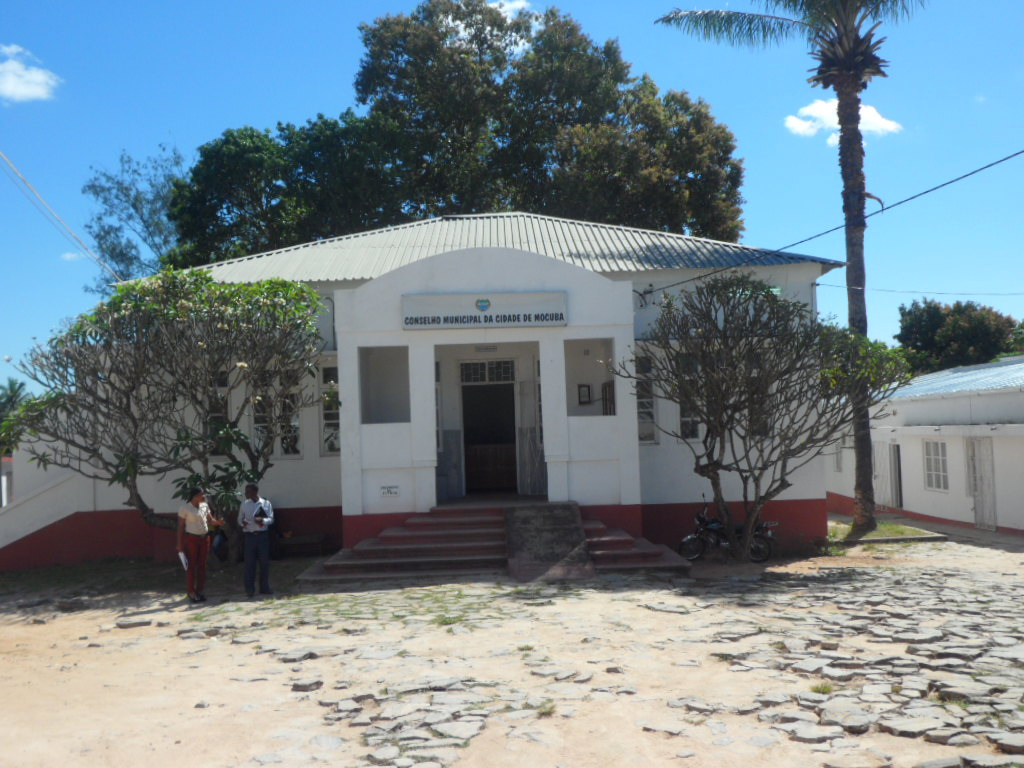
- Municipal council of Mocuba

- Location within Mozambique
- Coordinates: 16°51′S 36°59′E
- Country: Mozambique
- Provinces: Zambezia Province
- District: Mocuba District

Population (2007 census)
  - Total: 168,736

Mocuba is a city and seat of Mocuba District of Zambezia Province in Mozambique. It is located on the Licungo River.

== Geography ==
Mocuba is situated in the central part of Mozambique, approximately 600 kilometers (370 miles) to the north of the capital city, Maputo.

== Demographics ==
| Year | Population |
|---|---|
| 1997 | 55,923 |
| 2008 | 69,045 |

== See also ==
- Railways in Mozambique
- Railway stations in Mozambique
