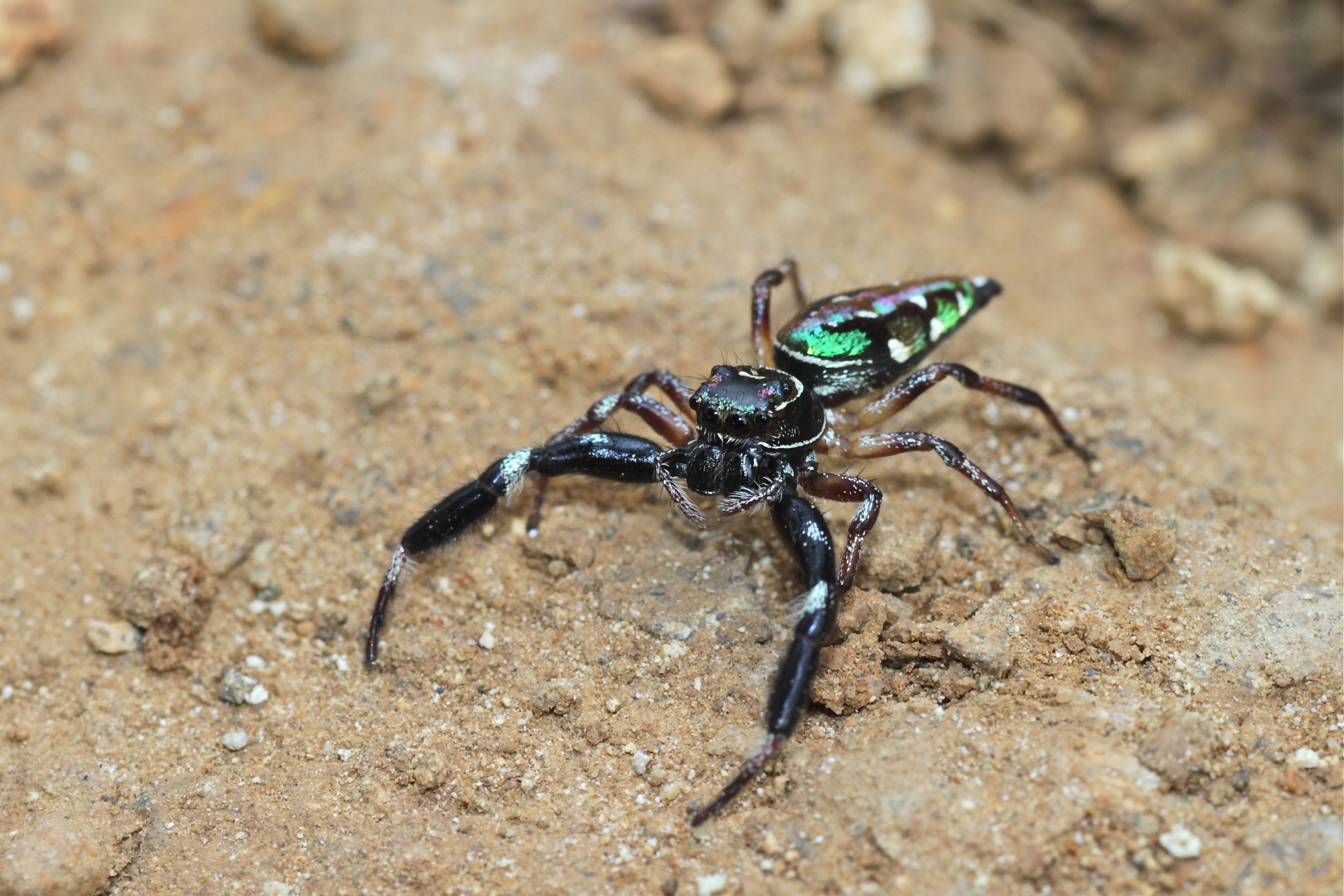
- Lurio sp. in Santa Fe National Park, Panama

Scientific classification
- Kingdom: Animalia
- Phylum: Arthropoda
- Subphylum: Chelicerata
- Class: Arachnida
- Order: Araneae
- Infraorder: Araneomorphae
- Family: Salticidae
- Subfamily: Salticinae
- Genus: Lurio; Simon, 1901

Type species
- Hyllus solennis C. L. Koch, 1846

Species
- See text.

= Lurio =

Genus of spiders

Lurio is a spider genus of the jumping spider family, Salticidae.

== Species ==
- Lurio conspicuus Mello-Leitão, 1930 – Brazil
- Lurio crassichelis Berland, 1913 – Ecuador
- Lurio lethierryi (Taczanowski, 1872) – French Guiana
- Lurio solennis (C. L. Koch, 1846) – Colombia, Venezuela, French Guiana
- Lurio splendidissimus Caporiacco, 1954 – French Guiana
