= Lichinga District =

District in Niassa Province, Mozambique

Coordinates: 13°19′S 35°14′E

Lichinga district in Mozambique

Lichinga District is a district of Niassa Province in north-western Mozambique. The principal town is Lichinga.

== See also ==
- Estamos
