= Cheringoma District =

Coordinates: 18.402661°S 35.017412°E

Cheringoma
- District
- Cheringoma District on the map of Mozambique
- Country: Mozambique
- Province: Sofala
- Capital: Inhaminga

Area
  - Total: 6,954 km^{2} (2,685 sq mi)

Population (2007 census)
  - Total: 34,133
  - Density: 4.908/km^{2} (12.71/sq mi)

Cheringoma District is a district of Sofala Province in Mozambique. The principal town is Inhaminga. The district is located in the northeast of the province, and borders with Caia District in the north, Marromeu District in the northeast, Muanza District in the south, Gorongosa District in the west, and with Maringué District in the northwest. In the south, it is bounded by the Indian Ocean. The area of the district is 6,954 square kilometres (2,685 mi^{2}). It has a population of 34,133 as of 2007.

== Geography ==
The northern part of the district belongs to the drainage basin of the Zambezi. The Zangué River, a major right tributary of the Zambezi, makes a border with Caia District. The rivers in the southeastern portion of the district drain into the Pungwe River.

The central part of the district lies on the Cheringoma Plateau. The highest point on the plateau is 379 meters elevation, located near Inhaminga. The plateau slopes steeply towards the north and west, and more gently towards the south and east.

The climate of the district is tropical wet dry (Aw in the Köppen climate classification). The average annual rainfall in the district varies between 1,000 millimetres (39 in) and 1,200 millimetres (47 in).

== Demographics ==
As of 2005, 43% of the population of the district was younger than 15 years. 23% of the population spoke Portuguese. The most common mothertongue among the population was Cindau. 81% were analphabetic, mostly women.

== Administrative divisions ==
The district is divided into two postos, Inhaminga (four localities) and Inhamitanga (two localities).

== Economy ==
Less than 1% of the households in the district have access to electricity.

=== Agriculture ===
In the district, there are 4,000 farms which have on average 1.3 hectares (0.0050 mi^{2}) of land. The main agricultural products are corn, cassava, cowpea, peanut, pearl millet, sorghum, and sweet potato.

=== Transportation ===
There is a road network in the district which includes a stretch of a national road connecting Beira and Caia. There is a railway between Beira and Caia as well. It is not operational.
