= Tambara District =

Coordinates: 16.960187°S 34.083954°E

Tambara
- District
- Tambara District on the map of Mozambique
- Country: Mozambique
- Province: Manica
- Capital: Nhacolo

Area
  - Total: 3,892 km^{2} (1,503 sq mi)

Population (2007 census)
  - Total: 41,339
  - Density: 10.62/km^{2} (27.51/sq mi)

Tambara District is a district of Manica Province in western Mozambique. The principal town is Nhacolo. The district is located in the north of the province, and borders with Tete Province in the north, Chemba District of Sofala Province in the east, Maringué District of Sofala Province in the southeast, Macossa District in the south, and with Guro District in the west. The area of the district is 3,892 square kilometres (1,503 mi^{2}). It has a population of 41,339 as of 2007.

== Geography ==
The district is located on the left bank of the Zambezi.

The climate of the district is tropical dry, with the annual rainfall varying between 500 millimetres (20 in) and 800 millimetres (31 in).

== Demographics ==
As of 2005, 51% of the population of the district was younger than 15 years. 16% did speak Portuguese. The most common mothertongue is Chitwe language. 84% were analphabetic, mostly women.

== Administrative divisions ==
The district is divided into three postos, Nhacolo (three localities), Búzua (two localities), and Nhacafula (one locality).

== Economy ==
Less than 1% of the households in the district have access to electricity.

=== Agriculture ===
In the district, there are 7,500 farms which have on average 1.5 hectares (0.0058 mi^{2}) of land. The main agricultural products are corn, cassava, cowpea, peanut, sorghum, and sweet potato.

=== Transportation ===
There is a road network in the district approximately 300 kilometres (190 mi) long which includes the regional road ER405 connecting Nhacolo with Tete Province.
