= Macossa District =

Coordinates: 17.896°S 33.961°E

Macossa
- District
- Macossa District on the map of Mozambique
- Country: Mozambique
- Province: Manica
- Capital: Macossa

Area
  - Total: 9,554 km^{2} (3,689 sq mi)

Population (2007 census)
  - Total: 27,245
  - Density: 2.852/km^{2} (7.386/sq mi)

Macossa District is a district of Manica Province in western Mozambique. The principal town is Macossa. The district is located in the east of the province, and borders with Tambara District in the north, Maringué District of Sofala Province in the northeast, Gorongosa District of Sofala Province in the east, Gondola District in the south, Báruè District in the west, and with Guro District in the northwest. The area of the district is 9,554 square kilometres (3,689 mi^{2}). It has a population of 27,245 as of 2007.

== Geography ==
The main rivers crossing the district is the Phandira River; a number of rivers are seasonal and only flow during the rainy season. The Pungwe River makes the border with Gondola District.

The climate in the west of the district is tropical wet and dry, with the annual rainfall varying between 800 millimetres (31 in) and 1,000 millimetres (39 in).

== Demographics ==
As of 2005, 50% of the population of the district was younger than 15 years. 14% did speak Portuguese. The most common mothertongue is Chitwe language. 88% were analphabetic, mostly women.

== Administrative divisions ==
The district is divided into three postos, Macossa (one locality), Nguawala (one locality), and Nhamangua (two localities).

== Economy ==
Less than 1% of the households in the district have access to electricity.

=== Agriculture ===
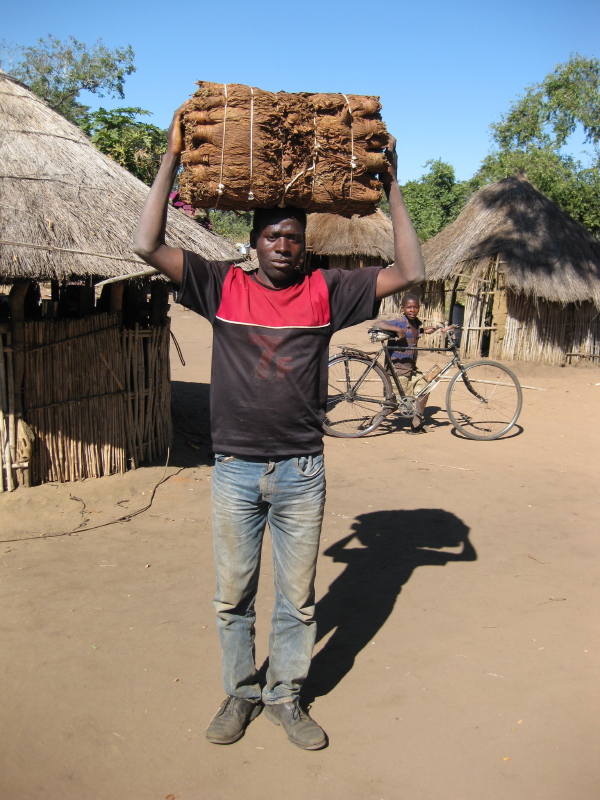
Tobacco carrier in Macossa

In the district, there are 2,000 farms which have on average 2.0 hectares (0.0077 mi^{2}) of land. The main agricultural products are corn, cassava, cowpea, peanut, sorghum, pearl millet, sweet potato, and rice.

=== Transportation ===
There is a road network in the district which contains 190 kilometres (120 mi) of secondary roads and 640 kilometres (400 mi) of local roads.
