= Muanza =

Human settlement in Mozambique

Coordinates: 18°53′50″S 34°47′34″E

- Town
- Location in Mozambique
- Country: Mozambique
- District: Muanza District

Muanza is one of two towns of this name in Mozambique. It is the headquarters of Muanza District. It is served by the Mozambique Railway's Central line.

== See also ==
- Railway stations in Mozambique
