= Massingir District =

Coordinates: 23.921°S 32.162°E

Massingir
- District
- Massingir District on the map of Mozambique
- Country: Mozambique
- Province: Gaza
- Capital: Massingir

Area
  - Total: 5,893 km^{2} (2,275 sq mi)

Population (2007 census)
  - Total: 28,470
  - Density: 4.831/km^{2} (12.51/sq mi)

Massingir District is a district of Gaza Province in southwestern Mozambique. The administrative center of the district is in Massingir. The district is located in the west of the province, and borders with Chicualacuala District in the north, Mabalane District in the east, Chókwè District in the southeast, Magude District of Maputo Province in the south, and with South Africa in the west. The area of the district is 5,893 square kilometres (2,275 mi^{2}). It has a population of 28,470 (2007).

== Geography ==
The Rio dos Elefantes and the Mazimulhpe River are the principal rivers in the area. Many rivers are seasonal and flow only during the rainy season. There are 10 lakes in the district. The Massingir Dam is located on the Rio dos Elefantes and is an important breeding ground for the Nile crocodile.

The climate is tropical dry semi-arid, with the average annual rainfall being between 600 millimetres (24 in).

Limpopo National Park, part of Great Limpopo Transfrontier Park, is shared between Massingir, Chicualacuala, and Mabalane Districts. The area of the park within Massingir District is 2,100 square kilometres (810 mi^{2}).

== History ==
The district was established in 1972, after the construction of the dam.

== Demographics ==
As of 2005, 45% of the population of the district was younger than 15 years. 20% of the population spoke Portuguese. The most common mothertongue among the population was Tsonga. 74% were analphabetic, mostly women.

== Administrative divisions ==
The district is divided into three postos, Massingir (three localities), Mavoze (three localities), and Zulo (three localities).

== Economy ==
4% of the households in the district have access to electricity.

=== Agriculture ===
In the district, there are 3,500 farms which have on average 3.8 hectares (0.015 mi^{2}) of land. The main agricultural products are corn, cassava, cowpea, peanut, sweet potato, and rice.

=== Transportation ===
There is a road network in the district which includes 130 kilometres (81 mi) of a national roads (Massingir to Chokwe) and 376 kilometres (234 mi) of secondary roads. None of the secondary roads are paved, and most are in a bad state.
