= Chigubo District =

Coordinates: 22.842°S 33.541°E

Chigubo
- District
- Chigubo District on the map of Mozambique
- Country: Mozambique
- Province: Gaza
- Capital: Dindiza

Area
  - Total: 14,864 km^{2} (5,739 sq mi)

Population (2007 census)
  - Total: 20,685
  - Density: 1.3916/km^{2} (3.6043/sq mi)

Chigubo District is a district of Gaza Province in south-western Mozambique. The administrative center of the district is Dindiza. The district is located in the east of the province, and borders with Massangena District in the north, Mabote and Funhalouro Districts of Inhambane Province in the east, Chibuto District in the south, Guijá District in the southwest, Mabalane District in the west, and with Chicualacuala District in the northwest. The area of the district is 14,864 square kilometres (5,739 mi^{2}). It has a population of 20,685 (2007).

== Geography ==
The Changane River, a major left tributary of the Limpopo River, makes a border of the district with Inhambane Province. The area of the district belongs to the drainage basin of the Limpopo.

The climate is tropical arid, with the average annual rainfall being 500 millimetres (20 in).

Banhine National Park, part of Great Limpopo Transfrontier Park, is shared between Chigubo, Chicualacuala, and Mabalane Districts. The area of the park within Chigubo District is 3,000 square kilometres (1,200 mi^{2}).

== History ==
Until 1986, there was a posto in Chicualacuala District. In 1986, Chigubo District was established.

== Demographics ==
As of 2005, 47% of the population of the district was younger than 15 years. 59% of the population spoke Portuguese. The most common mothertongue among the population was Tsonga. 82% were analphabetic, mostly women.

== Administrative divisions ==
The district is divided into two postos, Chigubo (two localities) and Dindiza (alternatively spelled Ndindiza, two localities).

== Economy ==
Less than 1% of the households in the district have access to electricity.

=== Agriculture ===
In the district, there are 2,500 farms which have on average 4.3 hectares (0.017 mi^{2}) of land. The main agricultural products are corn, cassava, cowpea, peanut, sweet potato, and rice.

=== Transportation ===
There is a road network in the district which includes about 800 kilometres (500 mi) of secondary roads, mainly connecting Chigubo with the rest of the district.
