= Meconta District =

Coordinates: 14.960°S 39.846°E

Meconta district in Mozambique

Meconta District is a district of Nampula Province in north-eastern Mozambique. The principal town is Meconta.
