= Nhamatanda District =

Coordinates: 19°16′S 34°13′E

Nhamatanda
- District
- Nhamatanda District on the map of Mozambique
- Country: Mozambique
- Province: Sofala
- Capital: Nhamatanda

Area
  - Total: 3,987 km^{2} (1,539 sq mi)

Population (2007 census)
  - Total: 210,757
  - Density: 52.86/km^{2} (136.9/sq mi)

Nhamatanda District is a district of Sofala Province in Mozambique. The principal town is Nhamatanda. The district is located in the center of the province, and borders with Gorongosa District in the north, Muanza District in the northeast, Dondo District in the east, Buzi District in the south, and with Gondola District of Manica Province in the west. The area of the district is 3,987 square kilometres (1,539 mi^{2}). It has a population of 210,757 as of 2007.

== Geography ==
The principal rivers in the district are the Muda River, the Mecuzi River, the Nhamatanda River, the Tsengudza River, the Nhamissenguere Metuchira River, the Mecuzi Manguena River, the Mítua River, the Mussicavo River, the Mutarara River, and the Pungwe River.

According to the Köppen climate classification, in the east the district has tropical wet and dry climate (Aw), and in the east tropical humid climate (Cw). The annual rainfall is 846 millimetres (33.3 in).

== History ==
Until colonial times, the area was scarcely populated, but for the railway construction people from the whole country were settled here. The district was established in 1980.

== Demographics ==
As of 2005, 43% of the population of the district was younger than 15 years. 36% did speak Portuguese. The most common mothertongue is Cindau. 71% were analphabetic, mostly women.

== Administrative divisions ==
The district is divided into two postos, Nhamatanda (two localities) and Tica (two localities).

== Economy ==
1% of the households in the district have access to electricity.

=== Agriculture ===
In the district, there are 33,000 farms which have on average 1.5 hectares (0.0058 mi^{2}) of land. The main agricultural products are corn, cassava, cowpea, peanut, sorghum, sweet potato, and rice.

=== Transportation ===
There is a road network in the district 520 kilometres (320 mi) long. It includes a stretch of the national road EN6 which connects Beira with Chimoio and the border with Zimbabwe. The railway from Beira to Zimbabwe crosses the district.
