= Murrupula District =

Coordinates: 15.461°S 38.681°E

Murrupula District is a district of Nampula Province in north-eastern Mozambique. The principal town is Murrupula.
