= Mutarara District =

District of Tete Province in Mozambique

Coordinates: 17.444°S 35.075°E

Mutarara District is a district of Tete Province in western Mozambique.
