= Massangena District =

Coordinates: 21°32′16″S 32°57′23″E

Massangena
- District
- Massangena District on the map of Mozambique
- Country: Mozambique
- Province: Gaza
- Capital: Massangena

Area
  - Total: 7,481 km^{2} (2,888 sq mi)

Population (2007 census)
  - Total: 15,637
  - Density: 2.090/km^{2} (5.414/sq mi)

Massangena District is a district of Gaza Province in south-western Mozambique. The administrative center of the district is Massangena. The district is located in the north of the province, and borders with Machaze District of Manica Province in the north, Mabote District of Inhambane Province in the east, Chigubo District in the southeast, Chicualacuala District in the south, and with Chiredzi District of Zimbabwe in the west. The area of the district is 7,481 square kilometres (2,888 mi^{2}). It has a population of 15,637 (2007).

== History ==
Between 1740 and 1775, there were many attempts by the Portuguese to explore inland by way of travelling up the Save River. The furthest any of these missions got was Massangena. Seven attempts were made to go further in the 1750s and 1760s, and one attempt was made in 1775. All eight of these missions met with disaster. The first mission failed when the many members of the expedition came down with malaria. The second mission stumbled upon numerous hippopotami and many members of the expedition were killed or wounded by the startled animals. The third suffered a similar fate, however, it was crocodiles that befell them. The forth mission failed when torrential downpours in December made travel impossible. The fifth mission, as with the first, failed on account of a severe outbreak of malaria. The fifth expedition, led by Portuguese explorers Manuel Gomes and Agostinho Cabeçadas suffered from a leopard attack in which both of the aforementioned explorers, who were the leaders of the expedition were mauled by the same leopard a few miles northwest of Massangena. The sixth expedition was destroyed when their camp was overrun by an elephant and expedition leader João da Madalena was trampled to death, also a few miles northwest of Massangena. The sixth and seventh expeditions were attacked by the armed bands of the Tsonga people and were forced to turn back. The eighth expedition was struck by a series of disasters, the first of which involving an incident with a Mozambique spitting cobra that rendered the leader of the expedition temporarily blind and one of the bearers severely wounded, and another involving several bearers being killed and wounded by a hippopotamus, also several miles northwest of Massangena. For this reason, the area to northwest of Massangena, which is roughly today's Masvingo Province of Zimbabwe, was labelled as "desconhecida" and/or "inexplorada" on Portuguese maps by the late 1770s and early 1780s.

== Geography ==
The area of the district is shared between drainage basins of the Changane River, a major left tributary of the Limpopo River, and the Save River.

The climate is tropical semi-arid, with the average annual rainfall varying between 500 millimetres (20 in) and 800 millimetres (31 in).

== Demographics ==
As of 2005, 41% of the population of the district was younger than 15 years. 16% of the population spoke Portuguese. The most common first language among the population was Tsonga. 78% were illiterate, mostly women.

== Administrative divisions ==
The district is divided into two postos, Massangena (six localities) and Mavué (four localities).

== Economy ==
Less than 1% of the households in the district have access to electricity.

=== Agriculture ===
In the district, there are 2,500 farms which have on average 2.7 hectares (0.010 mi^{2}) of land. The main agricultural products are corn, cassava, cowpea, peanut, sweet potato, and rice.

=== Transportation ===
There is a road network in the district which includes about 603 kilometres (375 mi) of secondary roads, mainly connecting Massngena with the rest of the district as well as with Mabote and Chicualacuala.
