= Pebane District =

Coordinates: 17.266°S 38.145°E

Pebane District is a district of Zambezia Province in Mozambique.
