= Inhamitanga =

Town in central Mozambique

- Town
- Location within Mozambique
- Coordinates: 18°13′8″S 35°09′36″E
- Country: Mozambique
- District: Cheringoma
- Province: Sofala
- Time zone: UTC+2:00 (CAT)

Inhamitanga is a town in Cheringoma District in Sofala Province of Mozambique.

== Transport ==
It is served by a station on the Mozambique Railway system, where it is a junction.

Inhamitanga is connected by an unpaved road R1002 with Chupanga.

== See also ==
- Transport in Mozambique
- Railway stations in Mozambique
