= Majune District =

Coordinates: 13.320°S 36.359°E

Majune district in Mozambique

Majune District is a district of Niassa Province in north-western Mozambique. The principal town is Majune.
