= Muecate District =

Coordinates: 14.889°S 39.634°E

Muecate District is a district of Nampula Province in north-eastern Mozambique. The principal town is Muecate.
