= Caia District =

Coordinates: 17.833°S 35.333°E

Caia
- District
- Caia District on the map of Mozambique
- Country: Mozambique
- Province: Sofala
- Capital: Caia

Area
  - Total: 3,542 km^{2} (1,368 sq mi)

Population (2007 census)
  - Total: 115,455
  - Density: 32.60/km^{2} (84.42/sq mi)

Caia District is a district of Sofala Province in Mozambique. The principal town is Caia. The district is located in the north of the province, and borders with Chemba District in the north, Marromeu District in the southeast, Cheringoma District in the south, and with Maringué District in the west. In the east, the district is bounded by the provinces of Tete and Zambezia. The area of the district is 3,542 square kilometres (1,368 mi^{2}). It has a population of 115,455 as of 2007.

== Geography ==
The district is located at the right bank of the Zambezi, and includes a part of the Zambezi Delta.

The climate of the district is tropical semi-arid at the interior and tropical humid at the coast. The average annual rainfall in the district is 987 millimetres (38.9 in).

== History ==
In the early colonial times, the area belonged to the Territory of Manica and Sofala. In 1891, the territory was split into three smaller divisions, and the area was transferred into one of them, Sena Circunscrição. In 1964, the latter was elevated to the category of Conselho, and in 1967, it was denamed into Conselho de Caia.

== Demographics ==
As of 2005, 45% of the population of the district was younger than 15 years. 23% of the population spoke Portuguese. The most common mothertongue among the population was Cindau. 81% were analphabetic, mostly women.

== Administrative divisions ==
The district is divided into three postos, Caia (two localities), Murraça (two localities), and Sena (two localities).

== Economy ==
1% of the households in the district have access to electricity.

=== Agriculture ===
In the district, there are 17,000 farms which have on average 1.3 hectares (0.0050 mi^{2}) of land. The main agricultural products are corn, cassava, cowpea, peanut, sweet potato, and rice.

=== Transportation ===
There is a road network in the district which is 256 kilometres (159 mi) long, of which 160 kilometres (99 mi) are in a bad state.

There is passenger navigation on the Zambezi.
