= Gorongosa District =

Coordinates: 18°41′S 34°04′E

Gorongosa
- District
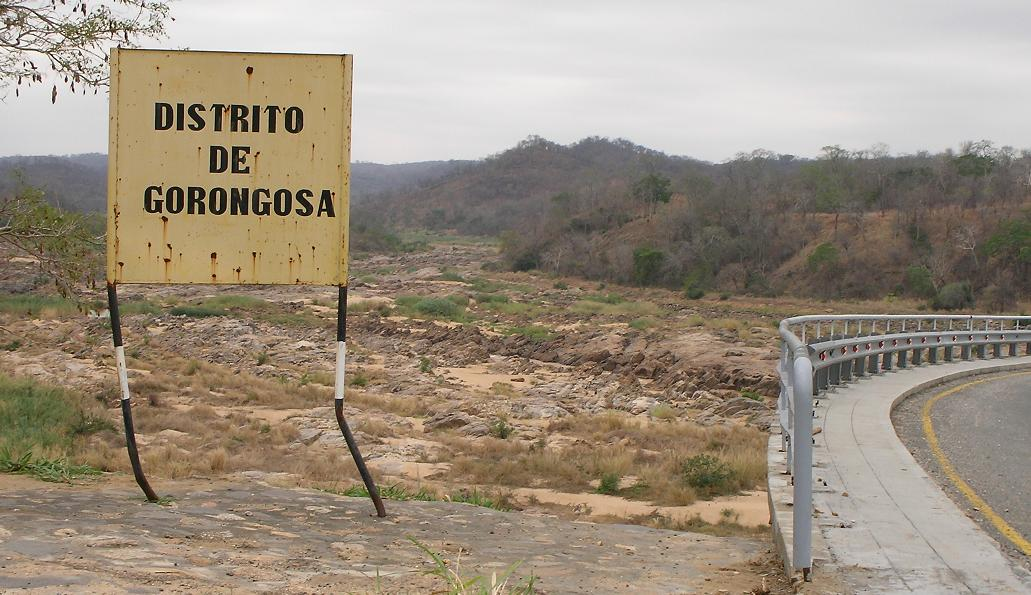
- Entrance to the district from the north

- Gorongosa District on the map of Mozambique
- Country: Mozambique
- Province: Sofala
- Capital: Gorongosa

Area
  - Total: 6,722 km^{2} (2,595 sq mi)

Population (2007 census)
  - Total: 116,912
  - Density: 17.39/km^{2} (45.05/sq mi)

Gorongosa District is a district of Sofala Province in Mozambique. The principal town is Gorongosa. The district is located in the northwest of the province, and borders with Maringué District in the north, Cheringoma District in the east, Muanza District in the southeast, Nhamatanda District in the south, and with Macossa and Gondola Districts of Manica Province in the west. The area of the district is 6,722 square kilometres (2,595 mi^{2}). It has a population of 116,912 as of 2007.

== Geography ==
The principal rivers of the district are the Vanduzi River and the Chitunga River in the west and the Vunduzi River and the Nhandu River in the east.

According to the Köppen climate classification, the district are in two climate zones, tropical wet dry (aw) and, in the mountains (Serra de Gorongosa) tropical temperate humid (cw). The average annual rainfall is 1,241 millimetres (48.9 in).

The district is dominated by the Gorongosa National Park, which is located in the East African Rift.

== Demographics ==
As of 2005, 48% of the population of the district was younger than 15 years. 24% of the population spoke Portuguese. The most common mothertongue among the population was Cindau. 82% were analphabetic, mostly women.

== Administrative divisions ==
The district is divided into three postos, Gorongosa (two localities), Nhamadzi (one locality), and Vanduzi (one locality).

== Economy ==
1% of the households in the district have access to electricity.

=== Agriculture ===
In the district, there are 15,000 farms which have on average 1.5 hectares (0.0058 mi^{2}) of land. The main agricultural products are corn, cassava, cowpea, peanut, sorghum, rice, sugar cane, and sweet potato.

=== Transportation ===
There is a road network in the district which includes 146 kilometres (91 mi) stretch of the national road E1 passing through Gorongosa.
