= Muanza District =

Coordinates: 18°53′50″S 34°47′34″E

Muanza
- District
- Muanza District on the map of Mozambique
- Country: Mozambique
- Province: Sofala
- Capital: Muanza

Area
  - Total: 7,500 km^{2} (2,900 sq mi)

Population (2007 census)
  - Total: 25,229
  - Density: 3.4/km^{2} (8.7/sq mi)

Muanza District is a district of Sofala Province in Mozambique. The principal town is Muanza. The district is located in the center of the province, and borders with Cheringoma District in the north, Dondo District in the south, Nhamatanda District in the southwest, and with Gorongosa District in the northwest. In the east, the district is bordered by the Indian Ocean. The area of the district is 7,500 square kilometres (2,900 mi^{2}). It has a population of 25,229 as of 2007.

== Geography ==
The principal rivers in the district are the Chineziwa River, the Sambanzou River, the Muanza River, and the Urema River.

The climate of the district is tropical wet and dry, with the annual rainfall varying between 800 millimetres (31 in) and 1,400 millimetres (55 in).

== History ==
The population of the district is mostly nomadic. The district was established in 1980.

== Demographics ==
As of 2005, 42% of the population of the district was younger than 15 years. 18% did speak Portuguese. The most common mothertongue is Cindau. 85% were analphabetic, mostly women.

== Administrative divisions ==
The district is divided into two postos, Muanza and Galinha, which comprise in total three localities.

== Economy ==
Less than 1% of the households in the district have access to electricity.

=== Agriculture ===
In the district, there are 3,000 farms which have on average 1.6 hectares (0.0062 mi^{2}) of land. The main agricultural products are corn, cassava, cowpea, peanut, sorghum, pearl millet, sweet potato, and rice.

=== Transportation ===
There is a road network in the district 271 kilometres (168 mi) long. Public transportation does not exist.
