= Songo, Mozambique =

Songo
- Location within Mozambique
- Coordinates: 15.61421°S 32.77092°E
- Country: Mozambique
- Provinces: Tete Province
- District: Cahora-Bassa District

Population (2007)
  - Total: 36,523
- Climate: BSh

Songo is a town in Tete Province in Mozambique. In 2007 it had a population of 36 523 inhabitants. It was elevated to town status 6 July 1972. Near the town is Songo Airport.

The town is situated five kilometers east of the Cahora Bassa Dam. It was established in 1969 as a settlement for the workers who built the dam, and the town is still dependent on Cahora Bassa.

Songo is unlike other towns in Mozambique in that it does not have any formal center.
