= Guijá District =

Coordinates: 24.500°S 33.015°E

Guijá
- District
- Guijá District on the map of Mozambique
- Country: Mozambique
- Province: Gaza
- Capital: Caniçado

Area
  - Total: 4,207 km^{2} (1,624 sq mi)

Population (2007 census)
  - Total: 75,303
  - Density: 17.90/km^{2} (46.36/sq mi)

Guijá District is a district of Gaza Province in south-western Mozambique. The administrative center of the district is Caniçado. The district is located at the south of the province, and borders with Chigubo District in the north, Chibuto District in the east, Chókwè District in the south, and with Mabalane District in the west. The area of the district is 4,207 square kilometres (1,624 mi^{2}). It has a population of 75,303 as of 2007.

== Geography ==
The district is located on the left bank of the Limpopo River. A number of minor rivers originate in the district, and crossing into Chibuto District, join the Changane River, a major left tributary of the Limpopo.

The climate is tropical dry semi-arid, with the average annual rainfall ranging 400 millimetres (16 in) and 600 millimetres (24 in).

== Demographics ==
As of 2005, 42% of the population of the district was younger than 15 years. 24% of the population spoke Portuguese. The most common mother tongue among the population was Tsonga. 71% were illiterate, mostly women.

== Administrative divisions ==
The district is divided into four postos, Caniçado (two localities), Chivongoene (two localities), Mubangoene (three localities), and Nalázi (two localities).

== Economy ==
1% of the households in the district have access to electricity.

=== Agriculture ===
In the district, there are 13,000 farms which have on average 2.9 hectares (0.011 mi^{2}) of land. The main agricultural products are corn, cassava, cowpea, peanut, sweet potato, and rice. Population of cattle, pigs, sheep, and goats was steadily growing prior to 2005.

=== Transportation ===
There is a road network in the district of the total length of 220 kilometres (140 mi), including a 61 kilometres (38 mi) stretch of the national road, connecting Caniçado and Chibuto. The bridge over the Limpopo River on the road connecting Caniçado and Chokwe was destroyed by Rhodesian forces in 1978, and a new bridge was only completed at the end of 2007.
