= Mecanhelas District =

Coordinates: 14°54′S 36°06′E

Mecanhelas district in Mozambique

Mecanhelas District is a district of Niassa Province in northern Mozambique. The principal town is Mecanhelas.
