= Mossuril District =

District of Nampula Province in north-eastern Mozambique

Coordinates: 14.966°S 40.661°E

Mossuril District is a district of Nampula Province in north-eastern Mozambique based in the principal town of the same name. Mossuril is a coastal district located in the Bay of Mossuril. It is eight kilometres from Mozambique Island by boat or approximately 51 kilometres by road. The district is said to be home to the oldest surviving European building in the Southern Hemisphere, the church of Nossa Senhora dos Remédios in the village of Cabaceira. The beaches of Chocas Mar, at the far tip of the district, are also a popular tourist attraction.

The End of the Road Festival (Portuguese: Festival Fim do Caminho) is an annual film festival that takes place in August that is held in Mossuril, Mozambique Island and Nampula, and headquartered in Mossuril.

Houses in this district are mostly built of local materials such as mud and grass cover, and were greatly impacted by Tropical Cyclone Gombe. It is estimated that around 1600 houses were destroyed in this cyclone in Mossuril.

== Demography ==
In the 2017 Census, Mossuril District was reported to have a population of 174,641 residents (male: 90,095; female: 84,546).

In 2007, the Census indicated a population of 116,301 residents. With an area of 3428 km^{2}, the population density was around 33.93 inhabitants per square kilometre.

According to the 1997 Census, the district had 89,457 inhabitants and an area of 3,428 km^{2}, resulting in a population density of 26.1/km^{2}.

== Administrative districts ==
The district is divided into three administrative posts (Lunga, Matibane and Mossuril ), made up of the following localities:

- Administrative Post of Lunga:
  - Lunga
- Matibane Administrative Post:
  - Matibane
- Administrative Post of Mossuril:
  - Mossuril village
  - Namitatari
