= Metangula =

- Location within Mozambique
- Coordinates: 12°42′S 34°49′E
- Country: Mozambique
- Provinces: Niassa Province

Metangula is a small town on the shores of Lake Niassa, 110 kilometers from the provincial capital of Lichinga in Niassa Province, Mozambique. A few kilometers north of Metangula lies the sand beach of Chuanga. The main agricultural crops from the area are cassava (mandioca) and Vigna beans (feijāo nhemba).
