= Maringué District =

Coordinates: 17.914°S 34.358°E

Maringué
- District
- Maringué District on the map of Mozambique
- Country: Mozambique
- Province: Sofala
- Capital: Maringué

Area
  - Total: 6,176 km^{2} (2,385 sq mi)

Population (2007 census)
  - Total: 75,089
  - Density: 12.16/km^{2} (31.49/sq mi)

Maringué District is a district of Sofala Province in Mozambique. The principal town is Maringué. The district is located in the north of the province, and borders with Chemba District in the north, Caia District in the east, Cheringoma District in the southeast, Gorongosa District in the south, with Macossa District of Manica Province in the west, and with Tambara District of Manica Province in the northwest. The area of the district is 6,176 square kilometres (2,385 mi^{2}). It has a population of 75,089 as of 2007.

== Geography ==
The principal rivers in the district are the Nhamapadza River, the Fudja River, the Nhanzuazua River, the Sambeza River, the Pundza River, and the Mupa River, most of which originate in Manica Province.

The rainy season in the district lasts from November to April, and the dry season lasts from May to October.

== History ==
In 1325, the Macaranga People occupied the area, which was subsequently administrated by a number of rivalling kingdoms. In 1836, it was claimed by the Gaza Empire. The Portuguese were interested in the area since 1607, but only started controlling it at the end of the 19th century. Between 1895 and 1970 it was divided between Chemba Circunscrição and Gorongosa Circunscrição.

== Demographics ==
As of 2005, 47% of the population of the district was younger than 15 years. 8% did speak Portuguese. The most common mother tongue is Cindau. 93% were analphabetic, mostly women.

== Administrative divisions ==
The district is divided into three postos, Maringué, Canxixe, and Subué, which together comprise five localities.

== Economy ==
Less than 1% of the households in the district have access to electricity.

=== Agriculture ===
In the district, there are 12,000 farms which have on average 2.8 hectares (0.011 mi^{2}) of land. The main agricultural products are corn, cassava, cowpea, peanut, sorghum, pearl millet, and sweet potato.

=== Transportation ===
There is a road network in the district 374 kilometres (232 mi) long.
