= Mavago District =

Mavago district in Mozambique

Mavago District is a district of Niassa Province in north-western Mozambique. The principal town is Mavago. The district lies along the border with Tanzania.

- Population (est. 2005): 17,046
- Area: 9,112 km^{2}.

== Coordinates ==
- Latitude: 12° 16' 12" South
- Longitude: 36° 33' 31" East

== Towns and villages ==
- Aldeia Calembe
- Aldeia Chitolo
- Aldeia Milepa
- Aldeia Wanga
- Antigo Posto Maziua
- Bilandega
- Cachepa
- Cajomomba
- Mamudo
- Mataca
- Mavago
- Metotela
- M'sawize
- Namacambale
- Nhalopa
- Omar
