= Namacurra District =

Coordinates: 17.495°S 37.028°E

Namacurra District is a district of Zambezia Province in Mozambique. With a population of over 240,000 in 2017, the Namacurra District has undergone moderate population growth since the late 1990s, when its population was only approximately 160,000."Namacurra (District, Mozambique) - Population Statistics, Charts, Map…". 2020-04-12. Archived from the original on 2020-04-12.
