= Memba District =

Region of Mozambique

Coordinates: 14.183°S 40.526°E

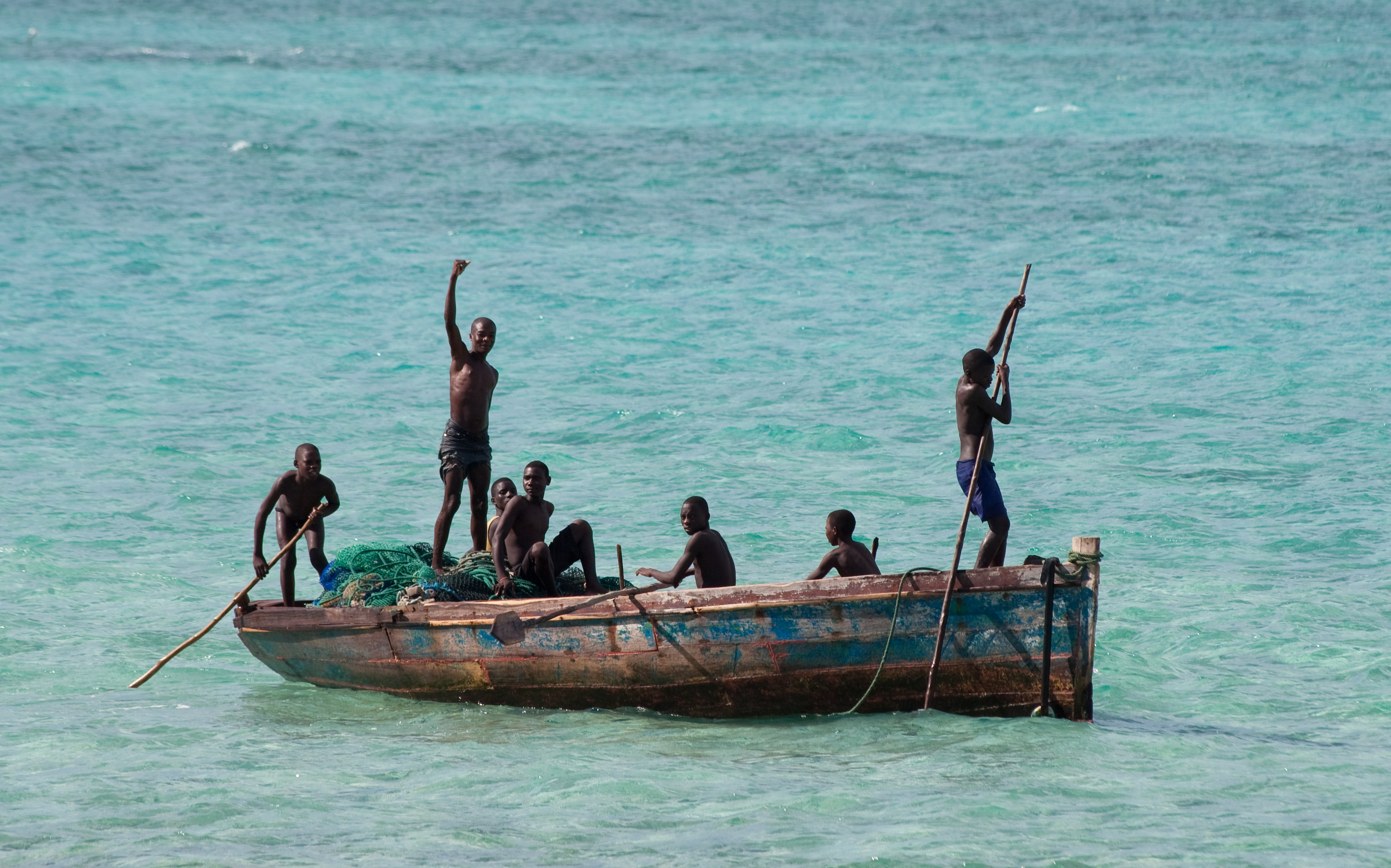
Fishermen in Memba Bay.

Memba district in Mozambique

Memba District is a district of Nampula Province in north-eastern Mozambique. The principal town is Memba.
