= Monapo District =

Coordinates: 14°55′01″S 40°18′08″E

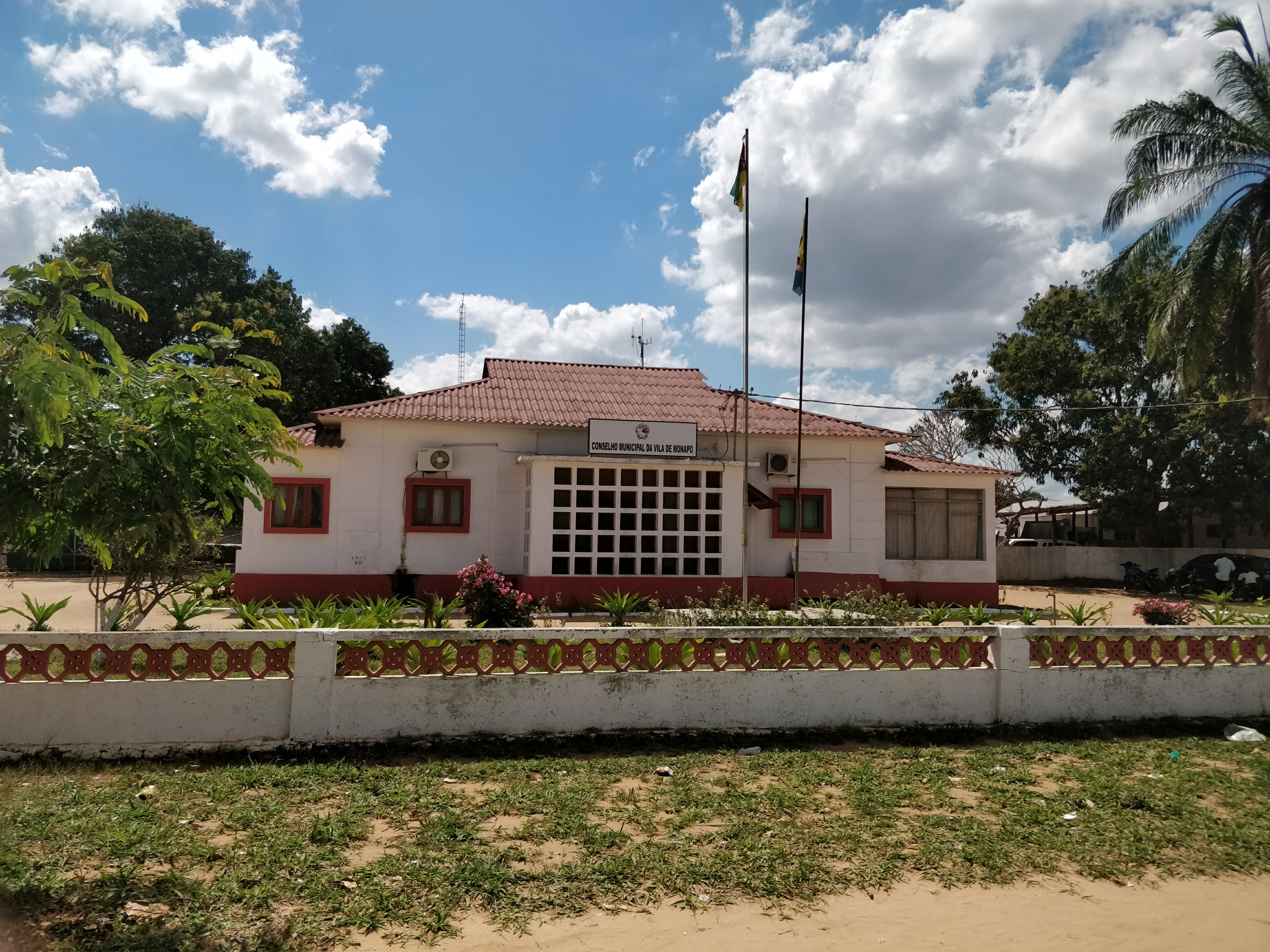
Municipal Council of Monapo building

Monapo District is a district of Nampula Province in north-eastern Mozambique. The principal town is Monapo.
