= Combomune =

Village in Gaza province, Mozambique

- Location within Mozambique
- Coordinates: 23°29′54″S 32°28′11″E
- Country: Mozambique
- Provinces: Gaza Province

Combomune is a small town in southern Mozambique. It lies on the north side of the Limpopo River.

Combomune is an important hydrometric station along the Limpopo.

Residents can pay a fee to be a member of a cooperative to exploit the nearby forests' wood for charcoal and furniture, a major source of income in the local economy.

== Transport ==
The town is served by a way-station of the southern line of the Mozambique Railways.

== See also ==
- Transport in Mozambique
