= Sanga District =

Sanga district in Mozambique

Sanga District is a district of Niassa Province in north-western Mozambique. The principal town is Sanga.
