= Nacarôa District =

Coordinates: 14.373°S 39.920°E

Nacarôa District is a district of Nampula Province in north-eastern Mozambique. The principal town is Nacarôa.
