= Ile District, Mozambique =

District in Zambezia Province, Mozambique

Coordinates: 16.197°S 37.470°E

Ile district in Mozambique

Ile District is a district of Zambezia Province in Mozambique. Ile is bordered by Gurué and Alta Molócue to the north, Mulevala to the east, Mocuba to the south, and Lugela and Namarroi to the west. While Portuguese is the official language of Mozambique, the most commonly spoken language in Ile is the Bantu language, eLomwe. Subsistence agriculture sustains a large portion of the Ile population with crops such as cassava, rice and corn. These cereal crops are supplemented with small-scale farms of legumes, sweet potato, peanut, greens, tomato, onion, garlic, and more. Commercial agricultural crops include tea and eucalyptus. Available fruits include orange, banana, mango, papaya, coconut, lemon and lime. Ile is home to many granite domes and other bornhardts.

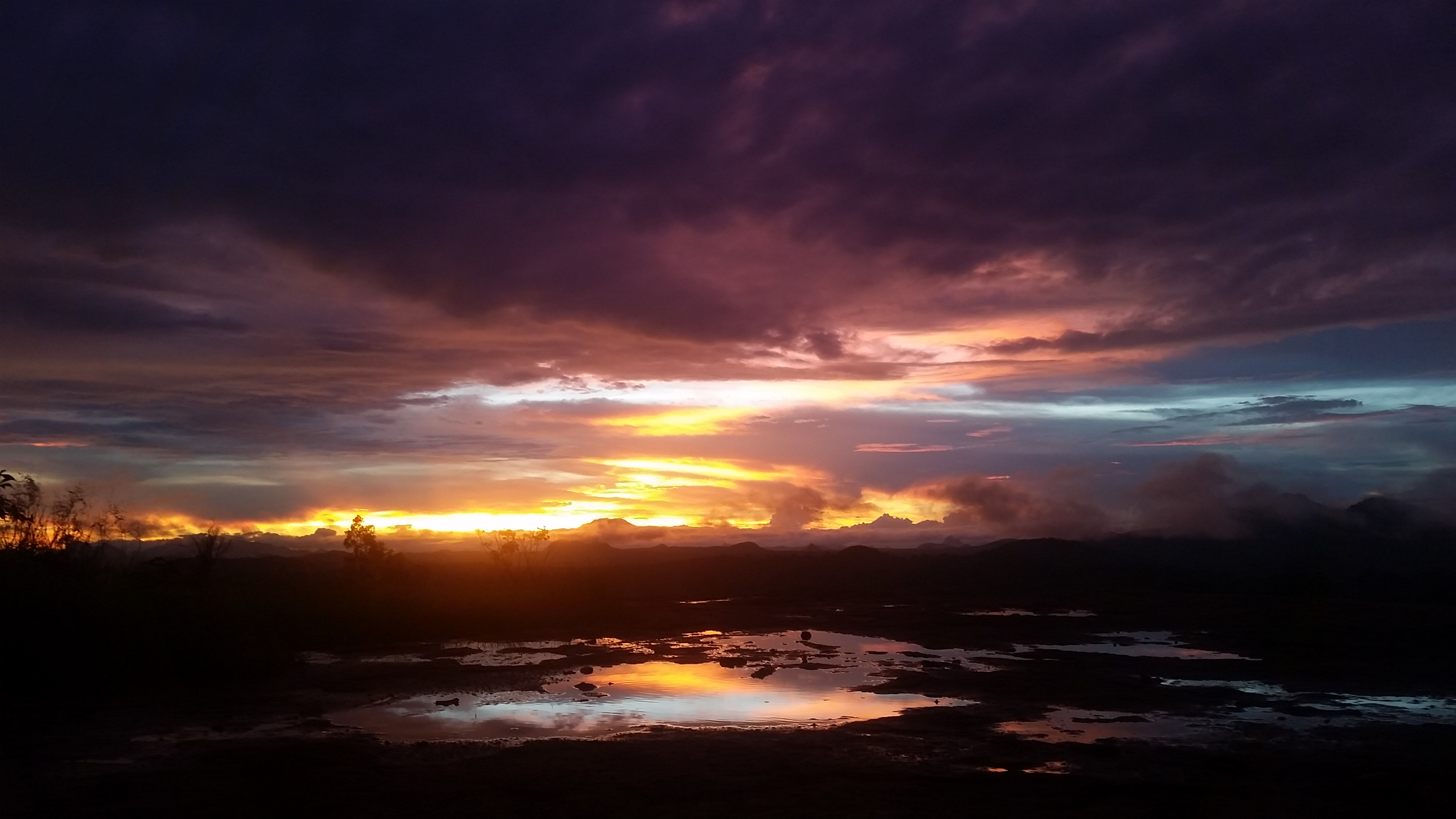
Sunset in Ile (Errego), Zambezia
