= Chinde District =

District in the Zambezia Province, Mozambique

Coordinates: 18°35′S 36°28′E

Localization of Chinde district in Mozambique

Chinde District is a district of Zambezia Province in Mozambique. The principal town is Chinde.
