= Moatize District =

District in Tete, Mozambique

Coordinates: 16°07′S 33°44′E

Moatize District is a district of Tete Province in western Mozambique. The principal town is Moatize. The district has a population of 343,546 (166,803 men and 176,743 women) as of the 2017 census.
