= Namarroi District =

Coordinates: 15.957°S 36.868°E

Namarrói District is a district of Zambezia Province in Mozambique. The headquarters of the district is Namarrói.
