= Zumbo District =

District in Tete, Mozambique

Coordinates: 15°37′S 30°27′E

Zumbo district in Mozambique

Zumbo District is a district of Tete Province in westernmost Mozambique. The principal town is Zumbo.
