= Nicoadala District =

District of Zambezia Province in Mozambique

Coordinates: 17.603°S 36.814°E

Nicoadala District is a district of Zambezia Province in Mozambique.
