= Tsangano District =

Coordinates: 15°22′20″S 34°26′40″E

Tsangano District is a district of Tete Province in western Mozambique.
