= Marromeu =

- Location within Mozambique
- Coordinates: 18°17′27″S 35°56′43″E
- Country: Mozambique
- Provinces: Sofala Province

Marromeu is a town in central Mozambique on the south side of the Zambezi River.

== Transport ==
It is served by a station on a branch off the central line of Mozambique Railways.

== See also ==
- Railway stations in Mozambique
- Transport in Mozambique
