= Milange District =

Coordinates: 16.101°S 35.770°E

Milange district in Mozambique

Milange District is a district of Zambezia Province in Mozambique. The town of Milange is the district center.

== History ==
Milange District was one of the areas where the Revolutionary Party of Mozambique (PRM) operated during the Mozambican Civil War's early stages. The PRM attacked the village of Mongue in the district in May 1981, and again raided the area in the following month.

== Villages and chiefdoms ==
- Mongue
- Sabelua
- Tengua
- Nhazombe
- Congono
- Mandua
- Gerasse
- Saenda
- Ponderane
- Vulalo
