= Mopeia District =

District in the Zambezia Province, Mozambique

Coordinates: 17.980°S 35.715°E

Mopeia District is a district of Zambezia Province in Mozambique.
