= Mocuba District =

Coordinates: 16°51′S 36°59′E

Mocuba District is a district of Zambezia Province in Mozambique. The main town is Mocuba.

As of the 1997 census, the district has a population of 214748 inhabitants.
