= Nyungwe language =

Bantu language spoken in Mozambique

Nyungwe
- Chinyungwe
- Native to: Mozambique
- Region: Tete Province
- Native speakers: 490,000 (2017 census)
- Language family: Niger–Congo?: Atlantic–Congo; Benue–Congo; Bantoid; Bantu; Nyasa; Sena (N40) ?; Nyungwe
- Writing system: Latin

Language codes
- ISO 639-3: nyu
- Glottolog: nyun1248
- Guthrie code: N.43

Nyungwe (Cinyungwe, Chinyungwe or Nhungue) is a Bantu language of Mozambique. It is used as a trade language throughout Tete Province. It belongs in the Southeastern Bantu branch, particularly in Guthrie zone N. It is closely related to Sena, Chewa, Nsenga and Tumbuka.

== Geographic distribution ==
Nyungwe is spoken by more than 439,000 people in Mozambique along the Zambezi River, principally in Tete Province.

== Official status ==
While Portuguese is the only official language of Mozambique, Nyungwe is one of the recognized national languages.

== Phonology ==
The phonological inventory is:

=== Vowels ===
| | Front | Back |
|---|---|---|
| High | i | u |
| Mid | e | o |
| Low | a | |

== History ==
Many vocabulary words collected by David Livingstone in Tete in the 1850s, and Courtois in the 1890s are similar to the words in common use by Nyungwe-speaking people today.

| Livingstone | Courtois | Martins | Translation |
|---|---|---|---|
| Molungo | Mulungu | Mulungu | God |
| Mozungo | Muzungu | Muzungu | White man |

== Examples ==
| Nyungwe | English |
|---|---|
| Sulo adayanya uxamwali na Moto | Rabbit makes friends with fire |
| Munembi: Basílio Gimo | Author: Basílio Gimo |
| Pantsiku inango sulo akhazunga m’phepete mwa gombe, ndipo mbvuu ikhabzizungirambo icimbadya mauswa yakusvipirira m’phepete mwa gombe momwe mukhana sulomo. Mbvuu iribe kuwona kuti sulo akhali m’phepete mule, na tenepo mbvuu idamuponda mwendo sulo. Ndipo sulo adalira, acipfuwula aciwuza mbvuu kuti: “Iwe mbvuu uli kuwona lini kuti uli kundiponda mwendo?” | One day, rabbit was walking by the river and hippo was also walking there eating grass by the shore of the river where rabbit was. Hippo didn't see that rabbit was by the shore there and so hippo stepped on rabbit's foot. Then rabbit cried, and yowled saying to hippo, "You hippo! Can't you see that you've stepped on my foot?" |
