= Geography of Mozambique =

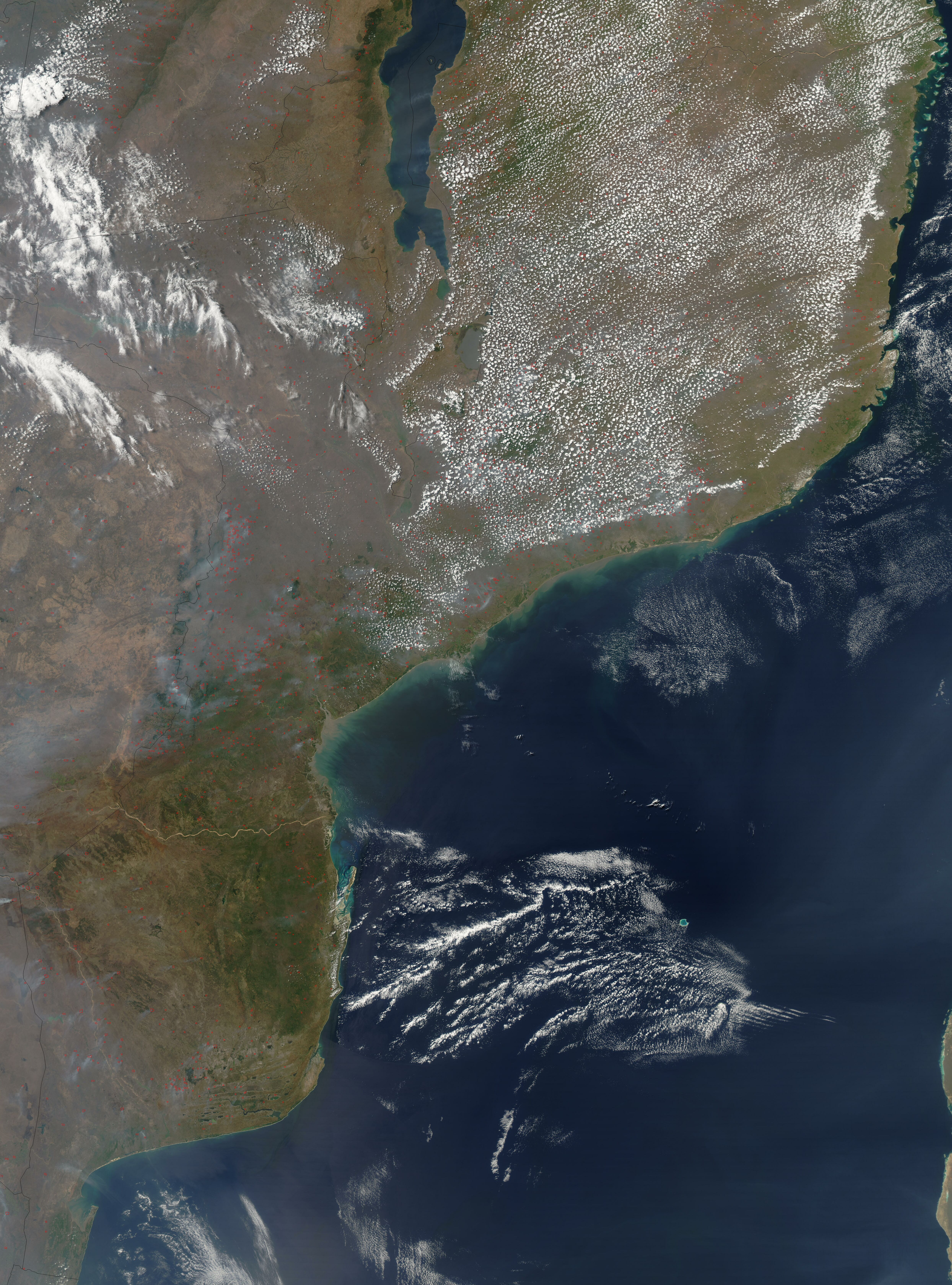
- Continent: Africa
- Region: East Africa
- Coordinates: 18°15′S 35°00′E
- Area: Ranked 35th
  - Total: 801,590 km^{2} (309,500 sq mi)
  - Land: 98.37%
  - Water: 1.63%
- Coastline: 2,500 km (1,600 mi)
- Borders: None
- Highest point: Monte Binga; 2,436 m (7,992 ft)
- Lowest point: Indian Ocean; 0 m (0 ft)
- Exclusive economic zone: 578,986 km^{2} (223,548 mi^{2})

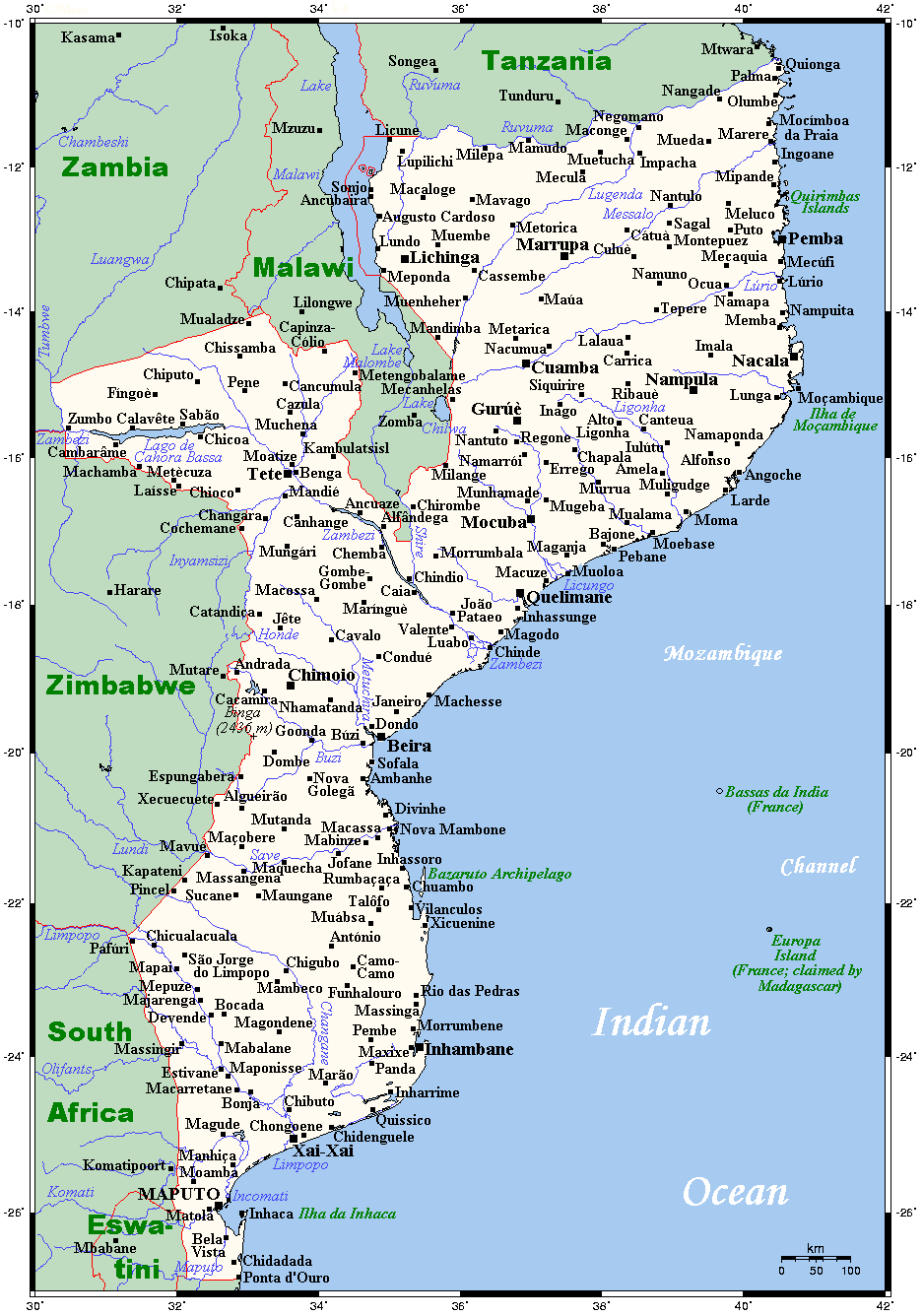
Map of Mozambique's population centres

Location of Mozambique

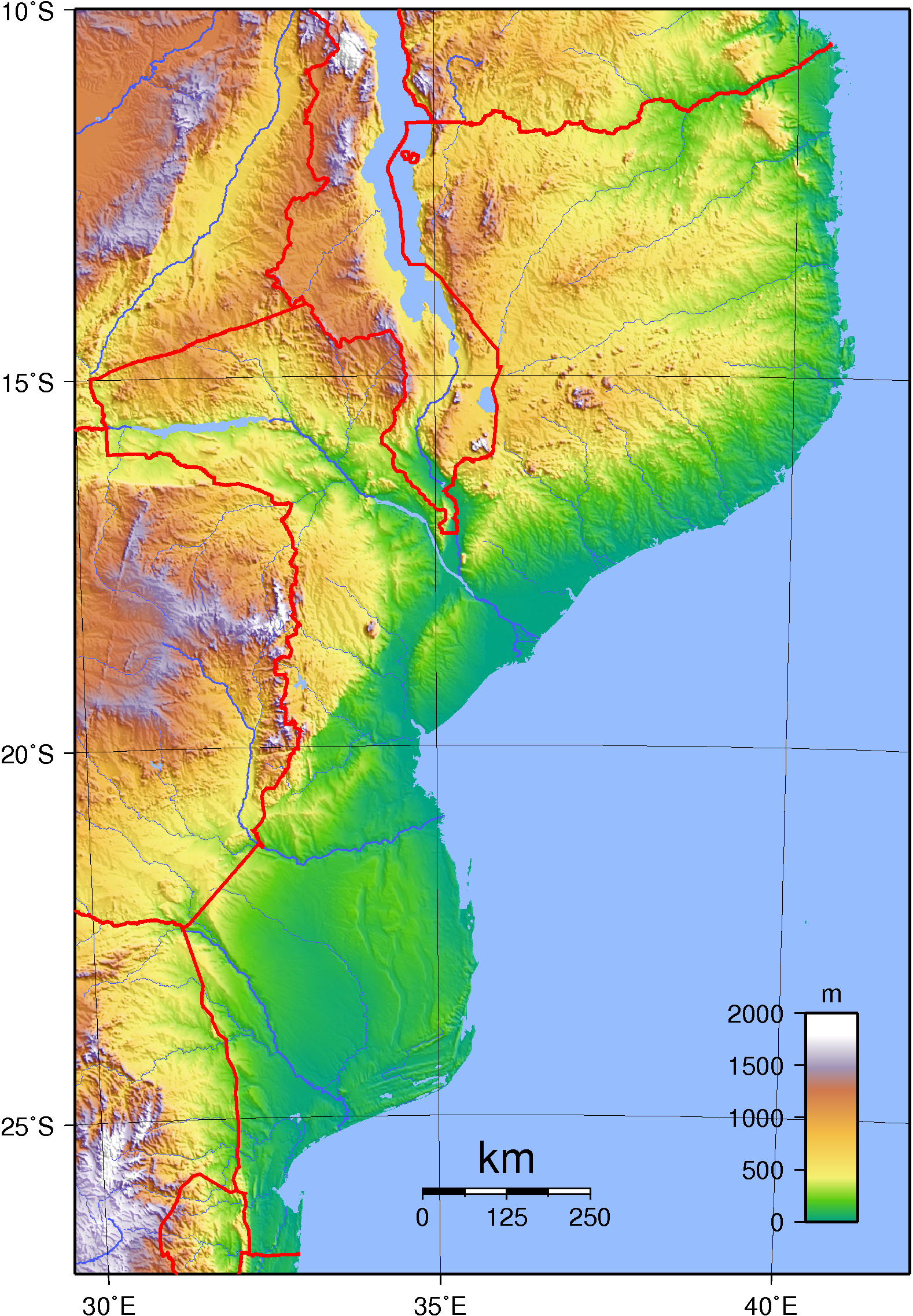
Mozambique's topography

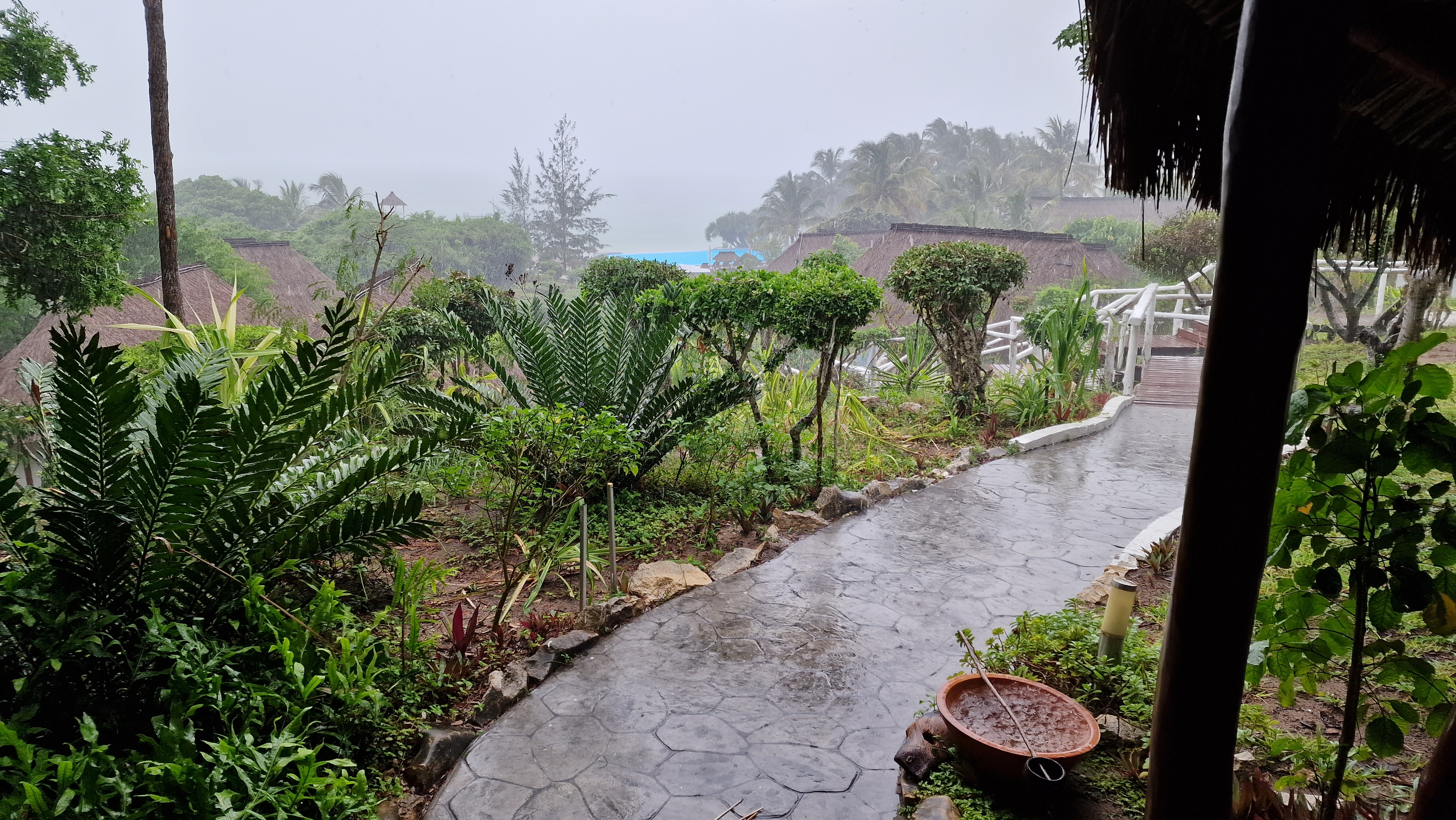
Rainstorm at a beach lodge in Mozambique

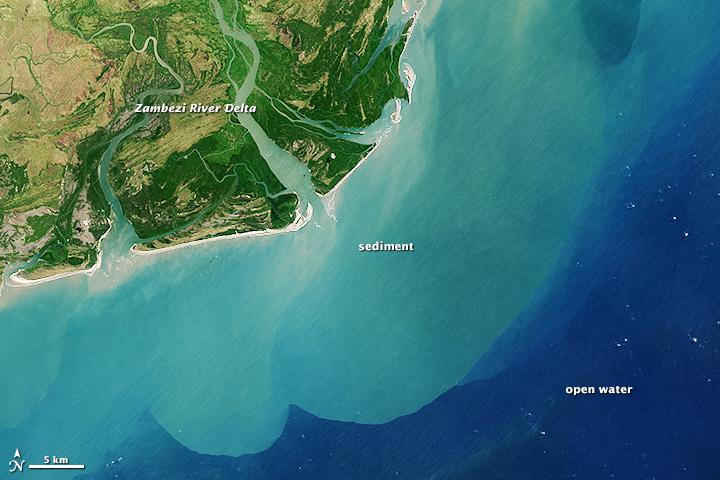
A view of the Zambezi river delta from space.

The geography of Mozambique consists mostly of coastal lowlands with uplands in its centre and high plateaus in the northwest. There are also mountains in the western portion. The country is located on the east coast of southern Africa, directly west of the island of Madagascar. Mozambique has a tropical climate with two seasons, a wet season from October to March and a dry season from April to September.

== Physical features ==
=== The coast ===
The coastline extends from 26° 52′ S. to 10° 40′ S., and from south to north makes a double curve with a general trend outward to the east. It has a length of 2,300 kilometres (1,430 mi).

The southern coastline is characterized by sandy beaches backed by coastal dunes. The dunes can reach up to 120 m (390 ft) in height, and older dunes are vegetated. Behind the coastal dunes are lagoons, including river estuaries, closed saline lagoons, and salt lakes. Some 65 km (40 mi) north of the South African frontier is the deep indentation of Maputo Bay (formerly Delagoa Bay). The land then turns outward to Cape Correntes, a little north of which is Inhambane Bay. Bending westward again and passing the Bazaruto Archipelago of several small islands, of which the chief is Bazaruto.

Mozambique's central coast, from Bazaruto Island north to Angoche Island, is known as the Bight of Sofala or Sofala Bay. It is also known as the Swamp Coast, and is characterized by extensive mangrove swamps and coastal wetlands. As in the south, the coastline is generally low, and harbours are few and poor. Beira is the principal seaport on the central coast, with rail and highway links to the interior.

The bay has an area of 801,590 km^{2} (309,500 mi^{2}). The continental shelf is up to 140 km (87 mi) wide at Beira, and is Mozambique's most important marine fishery. Several large rivers, including the Save, Pungwe, and Zambezi, create coastal estuaries and river deltas, of which the Zambezi delta is the largest. North of the Zambezi, the small coralline islands of the Primeiras and Segundas Archipelago lie parallel to the coast.

The northern coast is much indented, abounding in rocky headlands and rugged cliffs, with an almost continuous fringe of islands. On one of these islands is Mozambique, and immediately north of that port is Conducia Bay. Somewhat farther north are two large bays, Fernao Veloso Bay and Memba Bay. Nacala on Fernao Veloso Bay is the principal seaport on the northern coast, with a rail link to Malawi and the coalfields of northwestern Mozambique. North of Fernao Veloso and Memba bays is Pemba Bay, where there is commodious anchorage for heavy draught vessels. North of Pemba Bay the Quirimbas Islands lie offshore, and numerous bays and estuaries indent the coast. Cape Delgado, the northernmost point on Mozambique's coast, is part of the delta of the Ruvuma River, which forms Mozambique's border with Tanzania.

The northern coast is part of the East African coral coast, a marine ecoregion that extends along the coasts of northern Mozambique, Tanzania, and Kenya. Along the northern coast the Mozambique Current, which flows south between Madagascar and the continent is close to the coast and scours out all the softer material, while at the same time the corals are building in deep waters.

A recent global remote sensing analysis suggested that there were 2,029km² of tidal flats in Mozambique, making it the 16th ranked country in terms of how much tidal flat occurs there.

=== Orography ===
Orographically the backbone of the country is the mountain chain which forms the eastern escarpment of the continental plateau. It does not present a uniformly abrupt descent to the plains, but in places, as in the lower Zambezi district, slopes gradually to the coast. The Lebombo Mountains, behind Delagoa Bay, nowhere exceed 630 m (2,070 ft) in height. The Manica Plateau, farther north between the Save and Zambezi rivers, is higher, rising towards the Eastern Highlands along the border with Zimbabwe. Monte Binga (2,440 m or 8,010 ft), on the border with Zimbabwe, is Mozambique's highest peak. Mount Gorongosa (2,000 m or 6,550 ft) lies north-east of the Manica Plateau, and is, like it, of granitic formation. Gorongosa, rising isolated with precipitous outer slopes, has been likened in its aspect to a frowning citadel. East of Gorongosa a graben valley extends from the Zambezi to Pungwe Bay, the southern extension of the African Rift Valley. The Cheringoma Plateau lies east of the graben, sloping gently towards the coast.

The chief mountain range lies north of the Zambezi, and east of Lake Chilwa, namely, the Namuli Mountains, in which Namuli Peak rises to 2,700 m (8,860 ft), and Molisani, Mruli and Mresi attain altitudes of 2,000 to 2,400 m (6,500 to 8,000 ft) These mountains are covered with magnificent forests. Farther north the river basins are divided by well-marked ranges with heights of 900 m (3,000 ft) and over. Near the south-east shore of Lake Malawi there is a high range (1,500 to 1,800 m or 5,000 to 6,000 ft) with an abrupt descent to the lake — some 900 m (3,000 ft) in 10 km (6 mi). The country between Malawi and Ibo is remarkable for the number of fantastically shaped granite peaks, or inselbergs, which rise from the plateau.

The plateau lands west of the escarpment are of moderate elevation — perhaps averaging 600 to 750 m (2,000 to 2,500 ft). It is, however, only along the Zambezi and north of that river that Mozambique's territory reaches to the continental plateau. This northern plain has been categorised by the World Wildlife Fund as part of the Eastern miombo woodlands ecoregion.

=== Rivers ===
Besides the Zambezi, the most considerable river in Mozambique is the Limpopo which enters the Indian Ocean about 160 km (100 mi) north of Maputo Bay. The other Mozambican rivers with considerable drainage areas are the Komati, Save, Buzi, and Pungwe south of the Zambezi, and the Licungo (Likungo), Ligonha, Lúrio, Montepuez (Montepuesi or Mtepwesi), Messalo (or Msalu), and Ruvuma (or Rovuma) with its affluent the Lugenda (or Lujenda), north of the Zambezi.

The Save (or Sabi) rises in Zimbabwe at an elevation of over 900 m (3,000 ft), and after flowing south for over 320 km (200 mi) turns east and pierces the mountains some 270 km (170 mi) from the coast, being joined near the Zimbabwe-Mozambique frontier by the Lundi. Cataracts entirely prevent navigation above this point. Below the Lundi confluence the bed of the Save becomes considerably broader, varying from 1 to 3 km (1/2 to 2 mi). In the rainy season the Save is a large stream and even in the "dries" it can be navigated from its mouth by shallow draught steamers for over 240 km (150 mi). Its general direction through Mozambique is east by north. At its mouth it forms a delta 100 km (60 mi) in extent.

The Buzi (350 km or 220 mi) and Pungwe (290 km or 180 mi) are streams north of and similar in character to the Save. They both rise in the Manica Highlands and enter the ocean in a large estuary, their mouths 1.5 to 3 km (1 to 2 mi) apart. The lower reaches of both streams are navigable, the Buzi for 40 km (25 mi), the Pungwe for about 3 km (2 mi). The port of Beira is at the mouth of the Pungwe.

Of the north-Zambezi streams the Licungo, rising in the hills south-east of Lake Chilwa, flows south and enters the ocean not far north of Quelimane. The Lúrio, rising in the Namuli Mountains, flows north-east, having a course of some 320 km (200 mi). The Montepurez and the Messalo drain the country between the Lúrio and Ruvuma basins. Their banks are in general well-defined and the wet season rise seems fairly constant.

=== Somali Plate ===
Geologists have divided the Phanerozoic era of Mozambique's geology into the Karoo and post-Karoo era. This terminology is mostly used pertaining to studies of the structural and stratigraphic composition of rocks in the Zambezi valley. Mozambique entirely lies within the Somali Plate.

== Climate ==
Mozambique map of Köppen climate classification zones

Mozambique has a tropical climate with two seasons, a wet season from October to March and a dry season from April to September. Climatic conditions vary depending on altitude. Rainfall is heavy along the coast and decreases in the north and south.

Annual precipitation varies from 500 to 900 mm (19.7 to 35.4 in) depending on the region with an average of 590 mm (23.2 in). Cyclones are also common during the wet season. Average temperature ranges in Maputo are from 13 to 24 °C (55.4 to 75.2 °F) in July to 22 to 31 °C (71.6 to 87.8 °F) in February.

Climate data for Maputo (39 m), Mozambique (1961–1990)
Month	Jan	Feb	Mar	Apr	May	Jun	Jul	Aug	Sep	Oct	Nov	Dec	Year
Mean daily maximum °C (°F)	29.9 (85.8)	29.6 (85.3)	29.3 (84.7)	27.8 (82.0)	26.4 (79.5)	24.6 (76.3)	24.4 (75.9)	25.3 (77.5)	26.1 (79.0)	26.5 (79.7)	27.4 (81.3)	29.1 (84.4)	27.2 (81.0)
Daily mean °C (°F)	26.3 (79.3)	26.2 (79.2)	25.6 (78.1)	23.5 (74.3)	21.4 (70.5)	18.9 (66.0)	18.8 (65.8)	20.0 (68.0)	21.5 (70.7)	22.4 (72.3)	23.8 (74.8)	25.5 (77.9)	22.8 (73.0)
Mean daily minimum °C (°F)	22.3 (72.1)	22.3 (72.1)	21.5 (70.7)	19.4 (66.9)	16.9 (62.4)	14.4 (57.9)	14.2 (57.6)	15.4 (59.7)	17.2 (63.0)	18.3 (64.9)	19.7 (67.5)	21.4 (70.5)	18.6 (65.5)
Average precipitation mm (inches)	171.1 (6.74)	130.5 (5.14)	105.6 (4.16)	56.5 (2.22)	31.9 (1.26)	17.6 (0.69)	19.6 (0.77)	15.0 (0.59)	44.4 (1.75)	54.7 (2.15)	81.7 (3.22)	85.0 (3.35)	813.6 (32.04)
Average precipitation days (≥ 1.0 mm)	8.1	7.6	7.0	4.4	2.8	2.4	1.8	2.2	3.2	5.5	7.9	7.5	60.4
Average relative humidity (%)	76	76	77	76	74	73	72	71	73	75	75	74	74
Mean monthly sunshine hours	223	210	225	229	253	246	256	252	228	210	198	220	2,750
Source 1: Deutscher Wetterdienst
Source 2: Danish Meteorological Institute (sun only)

Climate data for Xai-Xai
Month	Jan	Feb	Mar	Apr	May	Jun	Jul	Aug	Sep	Oct	Nov	Dec	Year
Mean daily maximum °C (°F)	31.2 (88.2)	30.9 (87.6)	30.2 (86.4)	28.9 (84.0)	27 (81)	25 (77)	24.9 (76.8)	26.3 (79.3)	27.7 (81.9)	29.1 (84.4)	30 (86)	30.9 (87.6)	28.5 (83.4)
Daily mean °C (°F)	26.5 (79.7)	26.4 (79.5)	25.6 (78.1)	23.6 (74.5)	21.2 (70.2)	18.8 (65.8)	18.5 (65.3)	20.0 (68.0)	21.7 (71.1)	23.4 (74.1)	24.7 (76.5)	25.9 (78.6)	23.0 (73.5)
Mean daily minimum °C (°F)	21.7 (71.1)	21.9 (71.4)	20.9 (69.6)	18.4 (65.1)	15.3 (59.5)	12.6 (54.7)	12.1 (53.8)	13.6 (56.5)	15.7 (60.3)	17.6 (63.7)	19.4 (66.9)	20.8 (69.4)	17.5 (63.5)
Average precipitation mm (inches)	134.7 (5.30)	131.9 (5.19)	104.5 (4.11)	99.0 (3.90)	89.0 (3.50)	63.9 (2.52)	49.6 (1.95)	32.8 (1.29)	33.6 (1.32)	66.3 (2.61)	71.6 (2.82)	123.2 (4.85)	1,000.1 (39.36)
Source: World Climate

Climate data for Inhambane
Month	Jan	Feb	Mar	Apr	May	Jun	Jul	Aug	Sep	Oct	Nov	Dec	Year
Record high °C (°F)	36.0 (96.8)	36.3 (97.3)	35.2 (95.4)	34.5 (94.1)	33.2 (91.8)	32.7 (90.9)	31.5 (88.7)	32.2 (90.0)	34.5 (94.1)	34.1 (93.4)	37.3 (99.1)	36.7 (98.1)	37.3 (99.1)
Mean daily maximum °C (°F)	30.9 (87.6)	30.9 (87.6)	30.5 (86.9)	29.0 (84.2)	27.0 (80.6)	25.5 (77.9)	24.9 (76.8)	25.5 (77.9)	26.5 (79.7)	27.5 (81.5)	28.6 (83.5)	30.0 (86.0)	28.1 (82.6)
Mean daily minimum °C (°F)	22.8 (73.0)	22.8 (73.0)	22.0 (71.6)	20.4 (68.7)	18.0 (64.4)	16.0 (60.8)	15.6 (60.1)	16.4 (61.5)	18.0 (64.4)	19.4 (66.9)	20.7 (69.3)	21.9 (71.4)	19.5 (67.1)
Record low °C (°F)	18.8 (65.8)	17.0 (62.6)	18.2 (64.8)	15.4 (59.7)	12.3 (54.1)	10.6 (51.1)	11.0 (51.8)	10.5 (50.9)	13.5 (56.3)	11.6 (52.9)	15.0 (59.0)	17.3 (63.1)	10.5 (50.9)
Average precipitation mm (inches)	152.2 (5.99)	135.8 (5.35)	109.9 (4.33)	77.6 (3.06)	59.1 (2.33)	55.6 (2.19)	35.0 (1.38)	30.6 (1.20)	36.4 (1.43)	37.6 (1.48)	75.8 (2.98)	144.2 (5.68)	949.8 (37.39)
Average precipitation days (≥ 1.0 mm)	5.4	5.6	4.6	3.8	3.4	2.9	2.5	1.8	1.5	2.0	3.6	4.8	41.9
Average relative humidity (%)	75	75	74	75	77	78	76	75	75	74	73	73	75
Mean monthly sunshine hours	207.7	194.9	204.6	207.0	220.1	192.0	210.8	229.4	210.0	223.2	195.0	210.8	2,505.5
Mean daily sunshine hours	6.7	6.9	6.6	6.9	7.1	6.4	6.8	7.4	7.0	7.2	6.5	6.8	6.9
Source 1: World Meteorological Organization
Source 2: Deutscher Wetterdienst (extremes, humidity and sun)

Climate data for Beira
Month	Jan	Feb	Mar	Apr	May	Jun	Jul	Aug	Sep	Oct	Nov	Dec	Year
Record high °C (°F)	40.0 (104.0)	37.8 (100.0)	37.2 (99.0)	37.5 (99.5)	36.8 (98.2)	33.4 (92.1)	34.6 (94.3)	34.7 (94.5)	39.6 (103.3)	41.6 (106.9)	43.0 (109.4)	41.0 (105.8)	43.0 (109.4)
Mean daily maximum °C (°F)	31.4 (88.5)	31.0 (87.8)	30.4 (86.7)	29.4 (84.9)	27.6 (81.7)	25.8 (78.4)	25.2 (77.4)	26.1 (79.0)	27.6 (81.7)	28.9 (84.0)	30.0 (86.0)	30.8 (87.4)	28.7 (83.7)
Mean daily minimum °C (°F)	23.8 (74.8)	23.7 (74.7)	23.2 (73.8)	21.3 (70.3)	18.4 (65.1)	16.2 (61.2)	15.7 (60.3)	16.6 (61.9)	18.4 (65.1)	20.3 (68.5)	21.8 (71.2)	23.0 (73.4)	20.2 (68.4)
Record low °C (°F)	18.5 (65.3)	19.0 (66.2)	18.5 (65.3)	15.6 (60.1)	13.2 (55.8)	8.3 (46.9)	8.2 (46.8)	10.1 (50.2)	12.0 (53.6)	13.1 (55.6)	16.2 (61.2)	17.0 (62.6)	8.2 (46.8)
Average precipitation mm (inches)	250.7 (9.87)	302.3 (11.90)	274.4 (10.80)	139.6 (5.50)	84.6 (3.33)	48.3 (1.90)	47.0 (1.85)	42.4 (1.67)	24.6 (0.97)	38.0 (1.50)	110.3 (4.34)	231.6 (9.12)	1,593.8 (62.75)
Average precipitation days (≥ 1.0 mm)	10.8	12.5	11.7	8.2	7.0	7.2	7.7	5.4	3.4	5.1	7.3	10.2	96.5
Average relative humidity (%)	76	78	77	77	77	76	78	77	76	74	74	76	76
Mean monthly sunshine hours	244.9	226.0	241.8	246.0	254.2	222.0	232.5	254.2	243.0	257.3	228.0	235.6	2,885.5
Mean daily sunshine hours	7.9	8.0	7.8	8.2	8.2	7.4	7.5	8.2	8.1	8.3	7.6	7.6	7.9
Source 1: World Meteorological Organization
Source 2: Deutscher Wetterdienst (extremes, humidity and sun)

Climate data for Tete
Month	Jan	Feb	Mar	Apr	May	Jun	Jul	Aug	Sep	Oct	Nov	Dec	Year
Record high °C (°F)	43 (109)	43 (109)	43 (109)	43 (109)	40 (104)	39 (102)	36 (97)	40 (104)	44 (111)	45 (113)	46 (115)	44 (111)	46 (115)
Mean daily maximum °C (°F)	33.5 (92.3)	33.2 (91.8)	33.3 (91.9)	32.7 (90.9)	31.0 (87.8)	28.6 (83.5)	29.0 (84.2)	30.5 (86.9)	33.6 (92.5)	35.8 (96.4)	36.2 (97.2)	34.5 (94.1)	32.7 (90.8)
Daily mean °C (°F)	28.5 (83.3)	28.2 (82.8)	28.1 (82.6)	27.1 (80.8)	24.7 (76.5)	22.3 (72.1)	22.3 (72.1)	23.9 (75.0)	26.9 (80.4)	29.2 (84.6)	30.0 (86.0)	29.1 (84.4)	26.7 (80.1)
Mean daily minimum °C (°F)	23.4 (74.1)	23.2 (73.8)	22.8 (73.0)	21.4 (70.5)	18.3 (64.9)	16.0 (60.8)	15.6 (60.1)	17.3 (63.1)	20.2 (68.4)	22.6 (72.7)	23.8 (74.8)	23.6 (74.5)	20.7 (69.2)
Record low °C (°F)	7 (45)	8 (46)	9 (48)	11 (52)	10 (50)	7 (45)	8 (46)	9 (48)	10 (50)	10 (50)	10 (50)	11 (52)	7 (45)
Average precipitation mm (inches)	166.7 (6.56)	142.1 (5.59)	95.5 (3.76)	15.0 (0.59)	5.8 (0.23)	3.5 (0.14)	2.9 (0.11)	1.8 (0.07)	0.8 (0.03)	10.8 (0.43)	45.6 (1.80)	139.4 (5.49)	629.9 (24.8)
Average precipitation days	10.8	9.2	6.6	2.4	0.9	1.2	1.0	0.4	0.2	1.1	4.4	9.6	47.8
Average relative humidity (%)	69	73	67	61	60	61	59	54	47	43	54	62	59
Mean monthly sunshine hours	201.5	192.1	235.6	240.0	254.2	243.0	235.6	272.8	267.0	282.1	249.0	204.6	2,877.5
Source 1: World Meteorological Organization, Weltwetter Spiegel Online (sun and relative humidity)
Source 2: BBC Weather

Climate data for Nampula
Month	Jan	Feb	Mar	Apr	May	Jun	Jul	Aug	Sep	Oct	Nov	Dec	Year
Mean daily maximum °C (°F)	30.5 (86.9)	30.4 (86.7)	29.7 (85.5)	28.6 (83.5)	27.4 (81.3)	25.7 (78.3)	25.4 (77.7)	27.4 (81.3)	30.0 (86.0)	31.9 (89.4)	32.3 (90.1)	31.1 (88.0)	29.2 (84.6)
Daily mean °C (°F)	26.0 (78.8)	25.9 (78.6)	25.5 (77.9)	24.4 (75.9)	22.8 (73.0)	21.0 (69.8)	20.6 (69.1)	21.8 (71.2)	23.7 (74.7)	25.5 (77.9)	26.4 (79.5)	26.2 (79.2)	24.2 (75.5)
Mean daily minimum °C (°F)	21.5 (70.7)	21.5 (70.7)	21.3 (70.3)	20.2 (68.4)	18.1 (64.6)	16.3 (61.3)	15.8 (60.4)	16.2 (61.2)	17.4 (63.3)	19.1 (66.4)	20.5 (68.9)	21.4 (70.5)	19.1 (66.4)
Average precipitation mm (inches)	227.6 (8.96)	216.4 (8.52)	181.1 (7.13)	81.1 (3.19)	23.2 (0.91)	15.5 (0.61)	22.1 (0.87)	8.1 (0.32)	5.6 (0.22)	24.2 (0.95)	82.9 (3.26)	183.8 (7.24)	1,071.6 (42.19)
Average precipitation days	14.7	13.2	13.3	8.1	4.0	3.4	3.8	1.7	1.3	2.3	5.7	11.1	82.6
Source: World Meteorological Organization

Climate data for Pemba, Mozambique
Month	Jan	Feb	Mar	Apr	May	Jun	Jul	Aug	Sep	Oct	Nov	Dec	Year
Record high °C (°F)	34.5 (94.1)	34.5 (94.1)	36.0 (96.8)	33.4 (92.1)	33.5 (92.3)	31.5 (88.7)	30.6 (87.1)	31.8 (89.2)	33.4 (92.1)	33.6 (92.5)	35.2 (95.4)	35.7 (96.3)	36.0 (96.8)
Mean daily maximum °C (°F)	30.8 (87.4)	30.9 (87.6)	30.8 (87.4)	30.4 (86.7)	29.5 (85.1)	28.3 (82.9)	27.7 (81.9)	27.8 (82.0)	28.7 (83.7)	29.5 (85.1)	30.4 (86.7)	30.8 (87.4)	29.6 (85.3)
Mean daily minimum °C (°F)	23.2 (73.8)	23.1 (73.6)	22.8 (73.0)	22.0 (71.6)	20.3 (68.5)	18.6 (65.5)	18.2 (64.8)	19.6 (67.3)	19.8 (67.6)	21.6 (70.9)	23.0 (73.4)	23.5 (74.3)	21.3 (70.3)
Record low °C (°F)	21.5 (70.7)	21.4 (70.5)	21.7 (71.1)	20.0 (68.0)	18.3 (64.9)	16.9 (62.4)	16.9 (62.4)	16.5 (61.7)	18.5 (65.3)	20.0 (68.0)	21.5 (70.7)	21.4 (70.5)	16.5 (61.7)
Average precipitation mm (inches)	146.4 (5.76)	156.0 (6.14)	202.2 (7.96)	122.0 (4.80)	32.4 (1.28)	15.0 (0.59)	11.3 (0.44)	7.9 (0.31)	2.2 (0.09)	11.3 (0.44)	41.6 (1.64)	124.5 (4.90)	872.8 (34.36)
Average precipitation days (≥ 1.0 mm)	11.0	10.4	12.6	9.4	3.2	2.4	1.6	1.2	0.6	1.5	3.6	8.4	65.9
Average relative humidity (%)	80	82	81	76	74	72	71	71	72	73	74	77	75
Mean monthly sunshine hours	201.5	175.2	201.5	216.0	238.7	225.0	226.3	260.4	261.0	288.3	276.0	232.5	2,802.4
Mean daily sunshine hours	6.5	6.2	6.5	7.2	7.7	7.5	7.3	8.4	8.7	9.3	9.2	7.5	7.7
Source 1: World Meteorological Organization
Source 2: Deutscher Wetterdienst (extremes, humidity and sun)

== Forests ==
=== Tree cover extent and loss ===
Global Forest Watch publishes annual estimates of tree cover loss and 2000 tree cover extent derived from time-series analysis of Landsat satellite imagery in the Global Forest Change dataset. In this framework, tree cover refers to vegetation taller than 5 m (including natural forests and tree plantations), and tree cover loss is defined as the complete removal of tree cover canopy for a given year, regardless of cause.

For Mozambique, country statistics report cumulative tree cover loss of 4,594,927 ha (45,949.27 km^{2}) from 2001 to 2024 (about 15.9% of its 2000 tree cover area). For tree cover density greater than 30%, country statistics report a 2000 tree cover extent of 28,920,531 ha (289,205.31 km^{2}). The charts and table below display this data. In simple terms, the annual loss number is the area where tree cover disappeared in that year, and the extent number shows what remains of the 2000 tree cover baseline after subtracting cumulative loss. Forest regrowth is not included in the dataset.

Annual tree cover loss in Mozambique, 2001–2024. View chart definition.
Tree cover extent in 2000 minus cumulative tree cover loss in Mozambique, 2001–2024 (loss-only residual; does not account for gain). View chart definition.

Annual tree cover extent and loss
Year	Tree cover extent (km2) (Note: This residual measure does not include forest regrowth.)	Annual tree cover loss (km2)
2001	288,595.91	609.40
2002	287,529.27	1,066.64
2003	286,732.76	796.51
2004	285,655.46	1,077.30
2005	284,149.74	1,505.72
2006	282,427.32	1,722.42
2007	281,042.28	1,385.04
2008	278,994.48	2,047.80
2009	276,819.38	2,175.10
2010	274,873.87	1,945.51
2011	273,371.34	1,502.53
2012	271,971.82	1,399.52
2013	270,345.09	1,626.73
2014	268,339.92	2,005.17
2015	266,525.87	1,814.05
2016	264,020.21	2,505.66
2017	260,429.98	3,590.23
2018	258,705.94	1,724.04
2019	256,349.29	2,356.65
2020	254,024.05	2,325.24
2021	251,243.21	2,780.84
2022	248,864.45	2,378.76
2023	246,242.35	2,622.10
2024	243,256.04	2,986.31

=== REDD+ reference level and monitoring ===
Under the UNFCCC REDD+ framework, Mozambique has submitted a national forest reference emission level (FREL). On the UNFCCC REDD+ Web Platform, the country's 2018 submission is listed as having an assessed reference level, together with a reported national strategy and a reported national forest monitoring system, while safeguards information is listed as "not reported".

The first assessed FREL, technically assessed in 2018, covered the REDD+ activity "reducing emissions from deforestation" at national scale. Using a historical reference period of 2003–2013, the modified and assessed FREL was 38,956,426 t CO2 eq per year, revised from 46,213,014 t CO2 eq per year in the original submission.

The technical assessment states that the benchmark included above-ground biomass and below-ground biomass, and reported CO2 only, while excluding deadwood, litter and soil organic carbon. It also reports that Mozambique used a forest definition of land with a minimum area of 1 hectare (2.5 acres), minimum crown cover of 30 percent, and trees capable of reaching 3 metres or 9.8 feet in height at maturity. Activity data were derived from visual interpretation of annual satellite imagery using Collect Earth, while carbon-stock data were drawn from the national forest inventory carried out from 2015 to 2017.

== Facts ==
Area
- Total: 801,590 km^{2} (309,500 mi^{2})
  - country rank in the world: 35th
- Land: 786,380 km²
- Water: 13,000 km²

Area comparative
- Australia comparative: approximately the size of New South Wales
- Canada comparative: slightly less than twice the size of Newfoundland and Labrador
- United States comparative: slightly less than three times the size of Colorado
- EU comparative: slightly less than 3/5 larger than Spain

Capital

- Maputo (Lourenço Marques)

Major Cities

- Matola
- Nampula
- Beira
- Chimoio
- Nacala
- Quelimane
- Tete
- Lichinga
- Pemba (Porto Amelia)

Other Cities

- Angoche (António Enes)

Land boundaries: total: 4,571 km
border countries: Malawi 1,569 km, South Africa 491 km, Eswatini 105 km, Tanzania 756 km, Zambia 419 km, Zimbabwe 1,231 km

Coastline: 2,470 km

Maritime claims:
territorial sea: 12 nmi (22 km)
exclusive economic zone: 578,986 km^{2} (223,548 mi^{2}) and 200 nmi (370 km)

Elevation extremes:
lowest point: Indian Ocean 0 m
highest point: Monte Binga 2 436 m

Natural resources: coal, titanium, natural gas, hydropower, tantalum, graphite

Land use:
arable land: 6.51% (2011), 5.43% (2005 est.), 3.98% (1998 est.)
permanent crops: 0.25% (2011), 0.29% (2005 est.), 0.29% (1998 est.)
other: 93.24% (2011), 94.28% (2005 est.), 95.73% (1998 est.)

Irrigated land: 1,181 km^{2} (456 sq mi) (2003)

Total renewable water resources: 217.1 km^{3} (2011)

Natural hazards: severe droughts; devastating cyclones and floods occur in central and southern provinces

Environment — current issues: a long civil war and recurrent drought in the hinterlands have resulted in increased migration of the population to urban and coastal areas with adverse environmental consequences; desertification; pollution of surface and coastal waters; elephant poaching for ivory is a problem

Environment — international agreements:
party to: Biodiversity, Climate Change, Climate Change-Kyoto Protocol, Desertification, Endangered Species, Hazardous Wastes, Law of the Sea, Ozone Layer Protection, Ship Pollution, Wetlands

Ecoregions

- Eastern miombo woodlands
- Eastern Zimbabwe montane forest–grassland mosaic
- Maputaland coastal forest mosaic
- Southern miombo woodlands
- Southern Rift montane forest–grassland mosaic
- Southern Zanzibar–Inhambane coastal forest mosaic
- Zambezian coastal flooded savanna
- Zambezian flooded grasslands
- Zambezian halophytics
- Zambezian and mopane woodlands
- East African mangroves

== Extreme points ==
This is a list of the extreme points of Mozambique, the points that are farther north, south, east or west than any other location.

- Northernmost point — Mouth of the Rovuma River, Cabo Delgado Province
- Easternmost point — unnamed headland east of the village of Amade, Nampula Province
- Southernmost point — unnamed location on the border with South Africa east of the South African town of Mosi, Maputo Province
- Westernmost point — the point where the border with Zambia enters the Luangwa river, Tete Province

== See also ==
- Monte Muambe
- Mount Lico
- Mount Mabu
- Volcanoes of Mozambique
