= Urema Valley =

Valley in Mozambique

The Urema Valley, also known as the Urema Graben, is a lowland valley in Sofala Province of central Mozambique.

The Urema Valley extends from the Zambezi River south to Sofala Bay. It is a typical graben valley, with a flat bottom and escarpments on either side. It forms a broad crescent which bends towards the west as it extends from north to south. The valley floor is 12-80 meters above sea level, and averages about 40 km wide. Escarpments 300 to 400 meters high lead to plateaus. The Cheringoma Plateau lies to the east, and the Barue Plateau to the west. Mount Gorongosa lies on the Barue Plateau near the western escarpment.

The Urema Valley is the southernmost portion of the East African Rift, a continuation of the southern rift segment contains the Shire River valley and Lake Malawi.

Much of the valley floor is covered with seasonal wetlands, which are filled during the rainy season by rivers flowing off the Barue Plateau. The northern end of the graben is drained by the Zangue River, which flows north to join the Zambezi. The Urema River flows south into the lower Pungwe, and forms a large but shallow seasonal lake called Lake Urema. Gorongosa National Park occupies the central portion of the Graben, including Lake Urema.

The southernmost portion of the valley is occupied by the large estuary of the Pungwe and Buzi rivers, with extensive mangrove swamps. The port of Beira lies on the eastern shore of the estuary where it meets Sofala Bay.

In addition to the seasonally-flooded grasslands, the valley floor is occupied by warm and dry mopane woodland. Miombo woodlands occupy the more humid Barue Plateau. The climate of the Cheringoma Plateau is influenced by the Indian Ocean, and is home to coastal forest mosaic.
