= Chizarira National Park =

National park in Zimbabwe

- IUCN category II (national park)
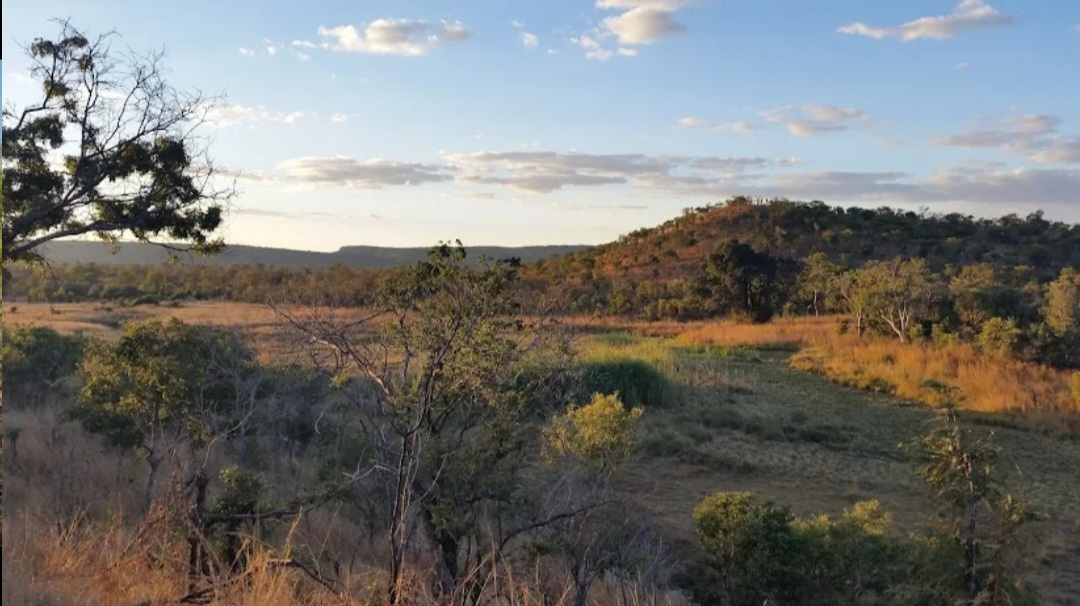
- Chizarira National Park, Zimbabwe
- Interactive map of Chizarira National Park
- Location: Northern Zimbabwe
- Coordinates: 17°45′S 28°10′E
- Area: 2,000 km^{2} (770 sq mi)
- Established: 1975

Chizarira National Park is a national park that lies in Northern part of Zimbabwe. At 2,000 square kilometres (490,000 acres), it is the third-largest national park in Zimbabwe, and also one of the least known because of its isolated situation on the Zambezi Escarpment. It has good wildlife populations and some majestic scenery. The name of the park comes from the Batonga word chijalila, which translates into English as "great barrier", referring to Zambezi Escarpment, of which Chizarira’s rough terrain forms a part.

== Description ==
The northern portion of the park is situated within the Southern miombo woodlands ecoregion, while the southern part is located within the Zambezian and mopane woodlands ecoregion. The escarpment falls steeply some 600 metres (2,000 ft) to the Zambezi River valley floor and offers magnificent views towards Lake Kariba, 40 kilometres (25 mi) north. Rivers such as the Mcheni and Lwizikululu have cut almost sheer gorges in the escarpment. At the north eastern extremity of the park lies Tundazi, a mountain on which, according to local legend, resides an immense serpent, the river god Nyaminyami. The southern boundary is marked by the Busi River which is flanked by floodplains supporting winter thorn Faidherbia albida woodlands.

Chizarira is Zimbabwe's 3rd largest national park, with a hugh population of four of the Big Five animals with the rhinos missing . The terrain is excellent for leopard, and there is a good variety of herbivore. Its main attraction is its enormous wilderness appeal. Walking safaris are a big part of the experience. Arguably Zimbabwe’s third largest National Park and indisputably the most remote wilderness area, Chizarira national park derives its name from the Batonga word “Chijalila” which means “The Great Barrier”, an orientation of phenomenal mountains and copious hills that form a fabulous portion of the Zambezi Escarpment. The terrain in the park is craggy, punctuated with ragged mountains, intensely incised by gorgeous gorges and awesome gulches. In the intensely impenetrable valleys, sandwiched by the unique open plain rests the lush vegetation comfortably suckled by vibrant natural springs. This has made the park an amazing place to appreciate nature.

== Fauna ==
Chizarira National Park, plays host to most of the expected plains wildlife as well as megafauna such as African elephant, lion, leopard and Cape buffalo. There are also many species of smaller wildlife, including the klipspringer, known for its ability to thrive in near-vertical rocky outcrops. Chizarira has a large variety of bird life and hundreds of species have been sighted within the Park. Sought after birds recorded include the African broadbill, Livingstone's flycatcher, western nicator, African emerald cuckoo and the rare and elusive African pitta. Chizarira is also home to the Taita falcon which breeds within the Park.

Chizarira was declared as a non-hunting reserve in 1938 and as a game reserve in 1963; it was given National Park status under the Parks and Wild Life Act (1975). The park has its headquarters at Manzituba.

This remoteness and the few visitors has meant that Chizarira has experienced increased risk from poachers in recent years. The lack of lodges and safari operators in the park has meant that poachers have free rein and the park has suffered as a result, particularly during the economic crisis that engulfed Zimbabwe in the early 2000s.
