= Cheringoma =

Cheringoma may refer to:

- Cheringoma District, a district of Sofala Province in Mozambique
- The Cheringoma Plateau, a coastal plateau which is partly in Cheringoma District.
