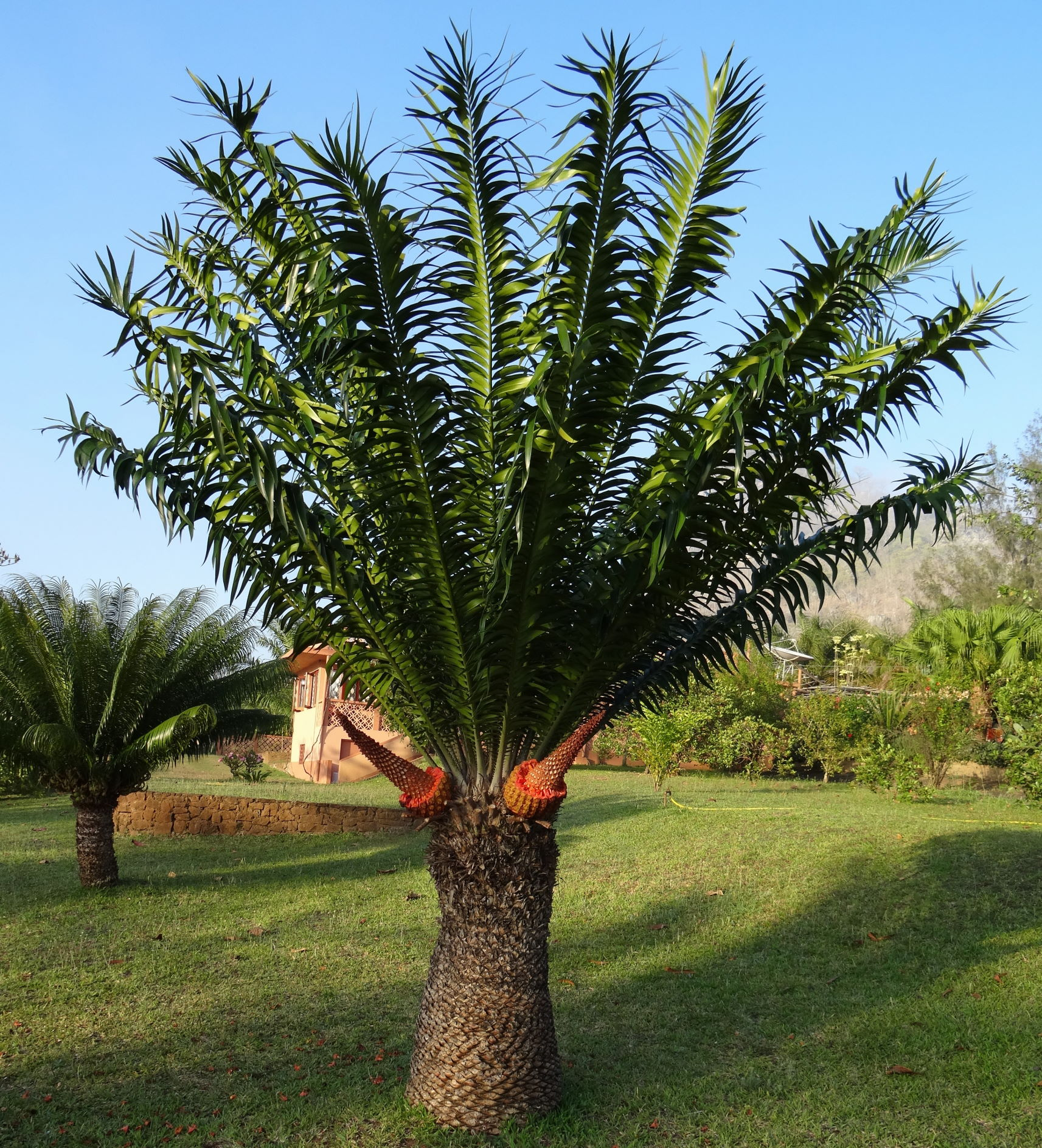

Conservation status
- Vulnerable (IUCN 3.1)
- CITES Appendix I (CITES)

Scientific classification
- Kingdom: Plantae
- Clade: Tracheophytes
- Clade: Gymnospermae
- Division: Cycadophyta
- Class: Cycadopsida
- Order: Cycadales
- Family: Zamiaceae
- Genus: Encephalartos
- Species: E. gratus

Binomial name
- Encephalartos gratus Prain

= Encephalartos gratus =

Species of cycad

Encephalartos gratus is a species of cycad that is native to Malawi and Mozambique.

== Description ==
The trunks of this plant are solitary, spherical, or reach up to 1.2 meters in height and 60 cm in width. The cataphylls are triangular and gradually taper from a width of 8 - 12 cm at the base. They are usually hairy on the underside. The plant has numerous arched leaves and shaped like a lance or a narrow oval. These leaves are 0.9 - 1.8 meters long and 34 - 44 cm wide, with a flat surface, a rounded tip, and a base that narrows abruptly. The petioles are 10 - 12 cm long with a swollen base, and is densely covered in brown hair. The rhachis is slightly conical and either smooth or slightly ridged. The leaflets are arranged in 30 to 70 pairs and do not overlap, dull green, flexible, and either straight or bent forward. The basal leaflets are reduced to thorns, while the middle leaflets are lanceolate, 18 - 26 cm long, and 23 - 35 mm wide. The upper margin of the middle leaflets has two to seven spines, while the lower margin has no spines or up to six spiny teeth.

The female cones of this plant are either solitary or occur in clusters of up to ten. They are cylindrical or approximately conical in shape, measuring 55 - 68 cm in length and 15 - 20 cm in diameter. The cones are dark brown in color, with a stem that is 11.2 - 13.7 cm long and 5 - 7.5 cm in diameter. The middle sporophylls are about 30 mm high and 56 mm wide. The sarcotesta is dull vermilion when mature, ovate in shape, measuring 30 - 37 mm in length and 19 - 21 mm in diameter, and is more or less smooth with 11 to 14 indistinct longitudinal furrows. In a local variation of this plant found in the Namuli Mountains of Mozambique, a cluster of leaves emerges from the tip of each cone, with the leaves reaching a length of a meter (3 ft 3 in).

The male cones are usually solitary but can occur in clusters of up to five. They are spindle-shaped, measuring 30 - 40 cm in length and 7.5 - 10 cm in diameter. The cones are densely covered in reddish-brown hair. The stem of the male cones is 15 - 17.5 cm long, hairy, and dull yellow-green with deep red spots. The middle sporophylls of the male cones are 19 mm high and just as wide. The sporangia, which are the structures that produce spores, are arranged in a single, somewhat heart-shaped spot within the cone.

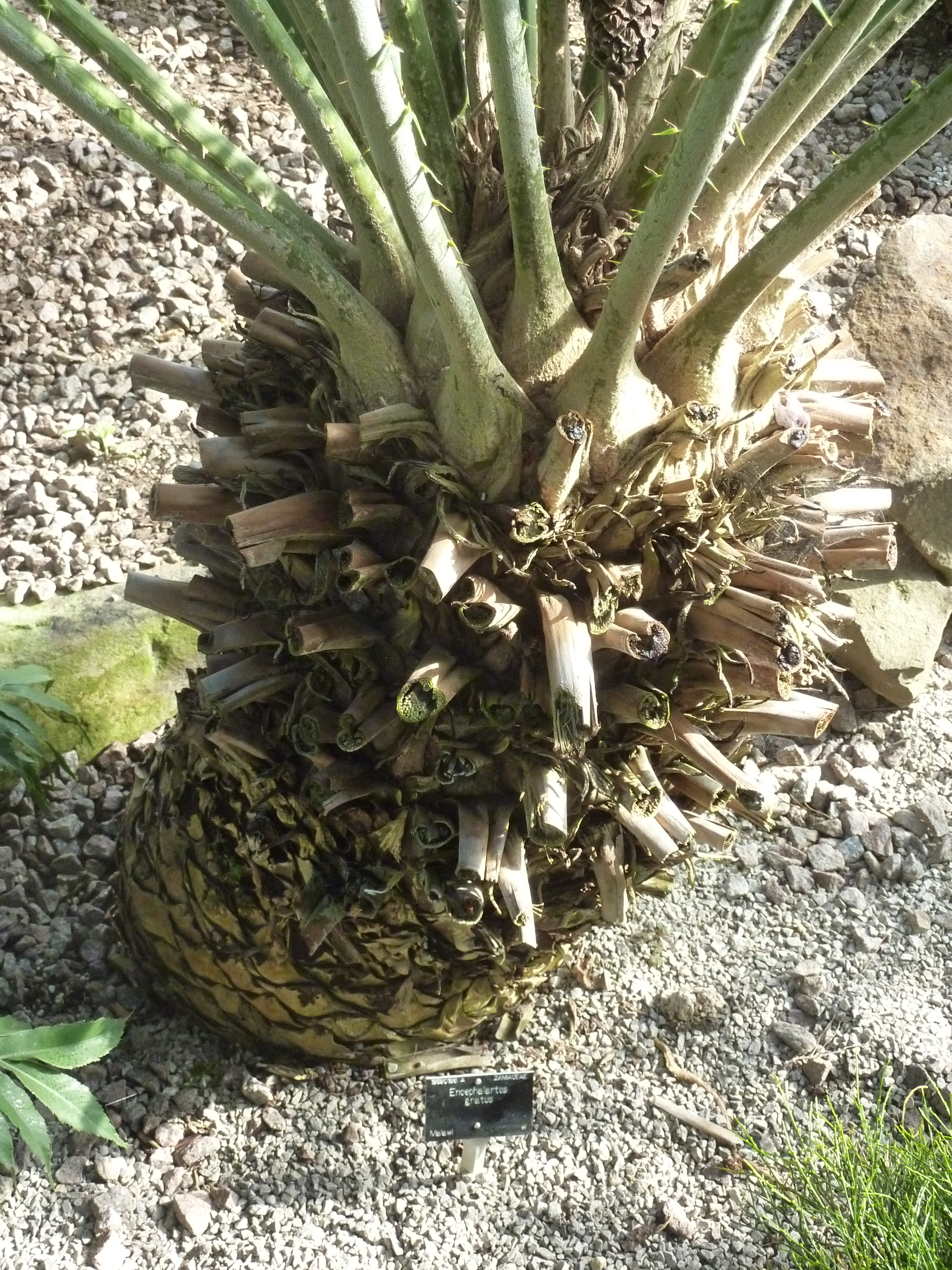
trunk

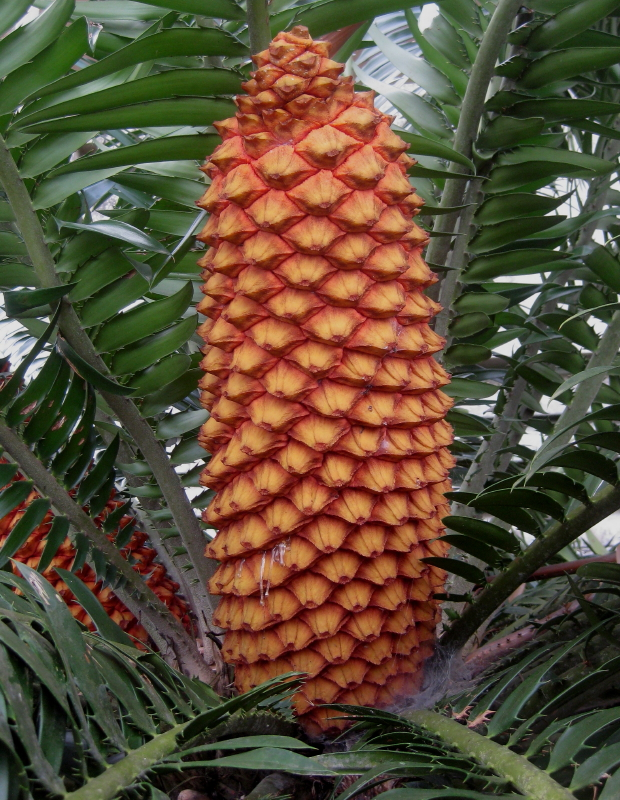
cones

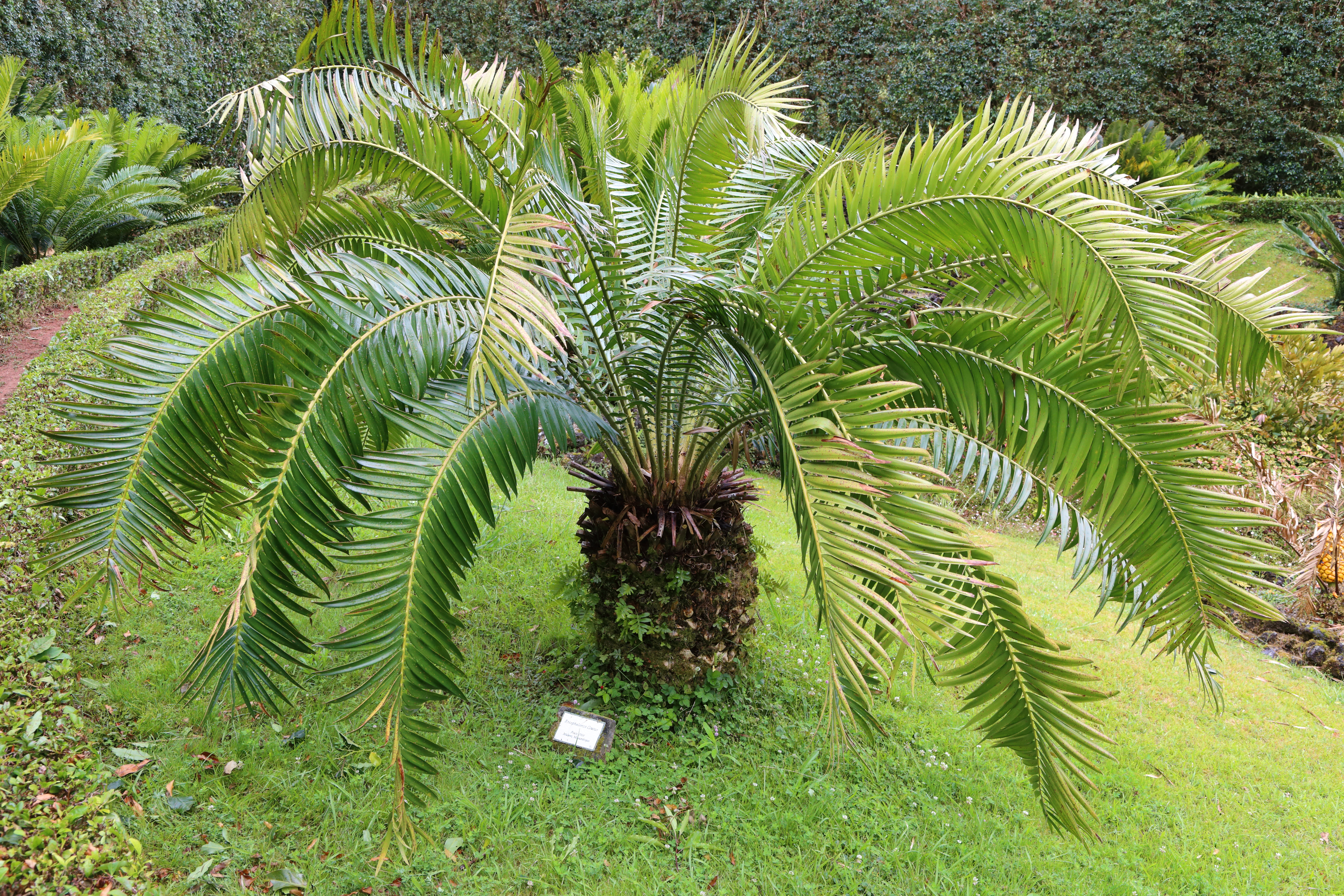
leaves

== Range ==
Encephalartos gratus is found in:

- Mulanje District, southern Malawi (area between the Tuchila River (Puchila) and the Ruo River)
- Zambezia Province, Mozambique
- Chiraba River and Navene River area, Mozambique
- Mount Namuli, near Derre, Mount Morrumbala, and Namarroi, Mozambique
