= Volcanoes of Mozambique =

Monte Muambe is a volcanic caldera located south-east of Moatize in Tete Province of Mozambique.

Morphologically, Monte Muambe is a ring-shaped feature, composed of Karroo sandstones which rise from peneplain plateau at altitude between 250 m in the south and 300 m in the north. The rim of the caldera forms a well-developed circular ridge of altered and indurated Karroo sandstones (gritstones) rising approximately 500 m above the plain of unaltered Karroo sediments. Due to hardness of altered Karroo sediments, after continuous, long-time erosion, Monte Muambe at present is a well-developed circular ridge (caldera), basin-shaped, and steep-sided with a crater-like depression inside. The core of the circular structure is 200 m lower than its periphery.

== Geology of adjacent area ==
The region of Monte Muambe is situated on the southern margin of the Tete gabbro-diorite complex of the Precambrian age, in a depression filled in the Mesozoic by sediments and volcanic activity products of the Karroo System.

=== Karroo System ===
Karroo sediments are in a tectonic relationship with older rocks. The boundary of the Tete gabbro-diorite complex is E -W striking dislocation. These sediments form an east-west trending belt, gently dipping to southeast in the sedimentary formation and volcanic rocks of Monte Muambe area.

The succession normally progresses from north to south. From the oldest formations in the north as represented by Serie Tilitos ad Serie Produtiva with coal seams (Beaufort), sedimentation progressed continuously to fossiliferous sandstones, often cross-bedded, including clay-marly beds (Stromberg) - which closed the Karroo sedimentation.

Volcanic formation of Stromberg Series consists of amygdaloid basalts plates in the form of lava flows over Karroo sandstones, and dolerite in the form of dykes.

Post-Karroo deposits are commonly represented by sandstones and conglomerates with interstratified Mesozoic or younger volcanic rocks. In the Monte Muambe region they are recognized as rocks of Lupata Series.

This geologic formation is divided into Lower Lupata Sandstones and Upper Lupata Series. Older sandstones consider to include also rhyolite and younger include alkaline rocks.

Only the Upper Lupata Sandstones are developed in Monte Muambe region. The formation consists of two members: clastic, mostly feldspathic various grained sandstones, and volcano erupted - alkali lavas. The intrusive members are syenite and carbonatite.

The complete sedimentary sequence is separated in Lupata region, about 10 km southeast of Monte Muambe, in Chincongolo area, near to Lupata Gorge, and consists of Upper Lupata Sandstones formation, intrusive rocks (syenite), carbonatites (intrusive and effusive products) and alkaline extrusive rocks. According to field findings geological units in the region as follows:

1. Coarse-grained and conglomeratic sandstones which transgressive overlain basalts, gently dipping to the south. 2. Agglomerates which developed from sandstones are composed mainly of fragments of Karroo sediments, volcanic carbonatite material, and syenite fragments - cemented with carbonate. The pyroclastic series base consists of agglomerate with carbonatite volcanic bombs and lapilli. 3. Alkali lava flows which cover sedimentary sequence forming tabular igneous bodies elongated to south, represented by rhomb porphyry trachytes and hyalotrahytes

Summarized the major events and characteristics of Lupata Series their time of extent was from Lower Jurassic to Lower Cretaceous, and from that time Monte Muambe, as a part of volcanic system of the East African Rift, represent carbonatite extinct volcano.

== Carbonatitic Complex ==
During the Lupate Series formation, in the phase of alkali magmatism, syenite and later carbonatite were also intruded.

The concave bottom of caldera, about 5 km in diameter, consists of carbonatite, agglomerate, tuff, feldspathic rocks (fenites) and basic dykes. The bottom periphery, 0.5 km wide, is mostly built of feldspathic rocks and little or no carbonatite.

The central circular part of highly dissected, craggy hills of carbonatite is asymmetrical and about 200 m lower than Karroo ridge. It is composed of relics of carbonatite intrusion, now appearing as carbonatite ring and subsided central part. The carbonatite ring is characterized by vertical scarps on inner side, with surface which often shows irregular knots, nodes, or veins of more resistant (silicate) material. Laterite covers are formed on both sides of carbonatite ring with accumulation of residual ferruginous-manganese minerals.

Carbonatitic rocks are characterized by considerable variation, or great variety of textures, while the mineral composition is quite uniform and chiefly independent of texture. According to texture of carbonatite, can be distinguished: hypidiomorphic granular, medium-grained, pseudoporphyric and trachytic.

The most abundant are carbonatites with granular texture, while porphyric and trachytoid carbonatites are much less abundant. Porphyric carbonatite are formed by fast cooling of semi-crystallized magma, or in contact with cool environment. The primary crystallized and fast crystallized calcites form phenocrysts and fine-grained groundmass, respectively. The slower cooled magma obtained granular texture.

Carbonatitic magma was probably separated during the differentiation and crystallization of syenites and alkali basic rocks. The primary silicate magma was enriched with alkalies, carbon-dioxide, calcium and deficient with silica. During the alkali syenite crystallization, the carbonate portion of silicate magma was separated forming carbonatitic magma. Alkalies were already linked with feldspars and feldspathoids both in alkali syenites and in metasomatic fenites to be contained by residual carbonate. That is why carbonatites contained very low alkalies. The carbonatitic magma, after the melt separation, was intruded in Karroo sandstones, or earlier formed fenites.

The bottom periphery of caldera, 0.5 km wide, is mostly built of feldspathic rocks (fenites), and little or no carbonatite. Under the name the fenites, several types of rocks are separated: fenised sandstones, syenite-fenite, syenite-fenite with nepheline, and feldspar breccias. The fenised sandstones and syenite-fenite form aureoles around carbonatites. The main characteristic for all fenites is metasomatic substitution and replacement of primary constituents by K-feldspar minerals.

At the end of carbonatitic volcano activity, hydrothermal stage have led to the formation of exploitable mineral resources, both in carbonatites and fenites.

== See also ==
- Mozambique
- Monte Muambe
