= Cheringoma Plateau =

Plateau in Sofala Province, Mozambique

- Location within Mozambique

Highest point
- Elevation: 379 m (1,243 ft)
- Coordinates: 18°26′24.3″S 35°04′49.8″E

Naming
- Language of name: Portuguese

Geography
- Location: Mozambique

The Cheringoma Plateau is a low plateau in Sofala Province of Mozambique. It lies mostly within Cheringoma, Muanza, and Marromeu districts.

== Geography ==
The Cheringoma Plateau lies near the coast, between the lower Zambezi and Pungwe rivers. The plateau is roughly oval in shape, trending northeast-southwest. The ridgeline follows the northern and western edge of the plateau. It reaches over 300 meters elevation along the ridgeline, with the highest point (379 meters) near the town of Inhaminga. The plateau falls gently towards the east and south, and steeply towards the west and north, known as the Cheringoma escarpment. The low, flat Urema Valley lies below the escarpment, bounding the plateau on the north and west. The Urema lowlands are part of the African Rift Valley system. The lowlands are home to seasonal lakes and wetlands. The northern portion of the graben is drained northeastwards by the Zangue River, a tributary of the Zambezi, while the southern portion is drained southwards by the Urema River, a tributary of the Pungwe. The Urema basin and the adjacent western portion of the plateau lie within Gorongosa National Park.

The Zambezi Delta lies to the northeast, and the streams originating in the northeast corner of the plateau empty into the delta. The plateau slopes gently on the southeast and south towards the Indian Ocean. A number of rivers, including the Savane, Sangussi, Zambazo (or Sambazo), Chinizuia, Zuni, and Mupa, drain southeastwards off the plateau into the Indian Ocean. The port of Beira lies to the southwest, near the mouth of the Pungwe River.

In the 1920s, the Trans-Zambezia Railway was built across the plateau, generally following the ridgeline between Beira and the Zambezi. The railway fell into disuse during the Mozambican Civil War, but was returned to use in 2010. The railway, now called the Sena line, runs from Beira to the coal mine at Moatize in Tete Province. Highway 120 runs parallel to the railway between Beira and Caia on the Zambezi. At Inhamitanga, a branch of the railway continues east to the river port of Marromeu on the Zambezi.

== Climate ==
The climate of the plateau is tropical savanna (Aw) according to the Köppen climate classification. Rainfall ranges from 1000 and 1200 mm annually, with most of the precipitation during the summer rainy season from December to March.

== Geology ==
The plateau is mostly covered by sandy soils, derived from conglomerate sandstones of the Miocene and Pliocene epochs, known as the Mazamba Formation. Underneath sandstone are Eocene marine limestones, known as the Cheringoma Formation. The Cheringoma Formation's limestone contain numerous marine fossils, including coral, gastropods, bivalves, and nummulites. The Cheringoma formation is exposed along the Cheringoma Escarpment, and has eroded into gorges and extensive caverns.

== Ecology ==
Most of the plateau is within the Southern Zanzibar-Inhambane coastal forest mosaic ecoregion, which extends from the coast to the ridgeline. Plant communities include humid miombo woodland and moist evergreen forest in river valleys. The northeastern and eastern slopes of the plateau and the Urema Graben are in the generally hotter and drier Zambezian and mopane woodlands ecoregion, characterized by savanna of Acacia, Sclerocarya, Burkea, and Hyphaene, along with floodplain grasslands and patches of deciduous forest.

The forests of the plateau are mostly unprotected and under intense logging pressure, but the plateau is still home to several intact stands of moist evergreen forest and miombo woodland. There are two forest reserves on the plateau, Inhamitanga (1704 ha) and Nhampacue (2620 ha). Controlled hunting areas, called coutadas, cover the eastern end of the plateau in Cheringoma and Marromeu districts – Coutadas 10, 11, and 12.

The Chinizuia Forest lies in Muanza District on the eastern slope of the plateau, in the valley of the Chinizuia River. It is famous among birdwatchers for offering some of the best miombo and forest birdwatching in southern Africa. Miombo woodland species include the southern banded snake eagle (Circaetus fasciolatus), Ayres's hawk-eagle (Hieraaetus ayresii), racket-tailed roller (Coracias spatulatus), Black-and-white shrike-flycatcher (Bias musicus), chestnut-fronted helmetshrike (Prionops scopifrons), Retz's helmetshrike (Prionops retzii), White-crested helmetshrike (Prionops plumatus), yellow-bellied hyliota (Hyliota flavigaster), red-throated twinspot (Hypargos niveoguttatus), and lesser seedcracker (Pyrenestes minor). In the streamside forests are the east coast akalat (Sheppardia gunningi), white-chested alethe (Chamaetylas fuelleborni), barred long-tailed cuckoo (Cercococcyx montanus), African pitta (Pitta angolensis), eastern bronze-naped pigeon (Columba delegorguei), silvery-cheeked hornbill (Bycanistes brevis), African broadbill (Smithornis capensis), Narina trogon (Apaloderma narina), speckle-throated woodpecker (Campethera scriptoricauda), lowland tiny greenbul (Phyllastrephus debilis), black-headed apalis (Apalis melanocephala), plain-backed sunbird (Anthreptes reichenowi), and western violet-backed sunbird (Anthreptes longuemarei). Nocturnal birds include the African wood owl (Strix woodfordii), African barred owlet (Glaucidium capense), Verreaux's eagle-owl (Bubo lacteus) and fiery-necked nightjar (Caprimulgus pectoralis).

The Inhamitanga Forest, which lies between the plateau town of Inhamitanga and the Zambezi lowlands to the northeast, is Mozambique's largest intact tract of forest. It covers an area of 40,000 hectares. It is located on sandy soil on the northern edge of the plateau, and combines flora typical of the coastal evergreen forest (Celtis mildbraedii, Drypetes gerrardii, and Donella viridifolia), deciduous sand forests (Millettia stuhlmannii and Xylia torreana), and Zambezian lowland savanna (Sterculia appendiculata). The forest has no permanent watercourses. The forest lies Coutada No. 12. The Inhamitanga Forest Reserve includes a narrow corridor through the forest – 250 meters on either side of the Inhamitanga-Chupanga road (Road 213), extending for 32 km.

The Nhampacue Forest Reserve is located in Cheringoma and Marromeu districts, on the boundary between the plateau and the inundated grasslands of the Zambezi delta. It covers an area of 2620 ha, with a flat or gently rising landscape. It is mostly Miombo woodland, with Brachystegia spiciformis predominant, along with Millettia stuhlmannii, Pteleopsis myrtifolia, Aganope stuhlmannii, and occasionally Albizia adianthifolia. There are areas of moist evergreen woodland, with Erythrophleum suaveolens, Inhambanella henriquesii, and Synsepalum brevipes, and areas of dry deciduous woodland and grassland. The reserve and the surrounding area has been degraded by logging and wildfires, with little closed-canopy forest remaining, and mature canopy trees widely scattered.

The numerous caves along the Cheringoma Escarpment are homes to large colonies of bats, including the striped leaf-nosed bat (Hipposideros vittatus) and the African trident bat (Triaenops afer).
