= Mount Morrumbala =

Mountain in Mozambique

- Location within Mozambique

Highest point
- Elevation: 1,172 m (3,845 ft)
- Coordinates: 17°26′44.6″S 35°23′30.8″E

Naming
- Language of name: Portuguese

Geography
- Location: Morrumbala District, Zambezia Province, Mozambique

Mount Morrumbala, also known as Mount Tembe, is a mountain in Morrumbala District of Zambezia Province in central Mozambique.

Mount Morrumbala rises as an isolated massif at western edge of the Morrumbala Plateau. The Morrumbala Plateau reaches over 400 meters elevation, descending gently to the north, more sharply to the south and east, and steeply towards the valley of the Shire River to the west. The Morrumbala escarpment separates the plateau from the Shire and Zambezi lowlands to the west and south. The Shire River valley is a graben, part of the African Rift Valley system.

The mountain's climate is cooler and wetter than the adjacent plateau and lowlands. Moist oceanic air masses moving in from the southeast rise up the mountain slopes and cool, and the moisture in the air condenses and falls as rain, or forms low clouds and morning mists. The windward south and east slopes receive more moisture than the north and west slopes, which are in the rain shadow of the mountain.

The cooler, wetter climate of the mountain sustains several communities of plants and animals, including moist evergreen forests, distinct from the surrounding lowlands.

Mount Morrumbala's montane forests are an inland enclave of the Southern Zanzibar-Inhambane coastal forest mosaic ecoregion, which extends along the more humid coast. The Eastern miombo woodlands ecoregion extends to the east on the Morrumbala Plateau. The Zambezian and mopane woodlands ecoregion lies to the west in the valley of the Shire and Zambezi rivers.
