= Cola clavata =

Conservation status
- Endangered (IUCN 3.1)

Scientific classification
- Kingdom: Plantae
- Clade: Tracheophytes
- Clade: Angiosperms
- Clade: Eudicots
- Clade: Rosids
- Order: Malvales
- Family: Malvaceae
- Genus: Cola
- Species: C. clavata

Binomial name
- Cola clavata Mast.

Synonyms
- Edwardia clavata (Mast.) Kuntze

Species of flowering plant

Cola clavata is a species of flowering plant in the family Malvaceae. It is native to Kenya, Malawi, Mozambique, Somalia, and Tanzania. In Mozambique it is found in the coastal forests of Zambezia and Sofala.

It is affected by habitat loss from the destruction of its native forests by human-caused fires and conversion to agriculture. Only small patches of undisturbed forest remain.
