= Chipinge Safari Area =

Protected area in Chipinge District, Zimbabwe

20°21′S 32°43′E

Chipinge Safari Area is a protected area in Chipinge District of Zimbabwe, west of the town of Chipinge.

== Geography ==
The safari area covers 261km^{2}. It lies at the southwestern edge of the Eastern Highlands, and slopes generally westwards towards the valley of the Save River. Elevations range from 540 to 1132 meters.

The Nyautsa, Chipunga, and Chipangayi rivers run from east to west through the park, draining off the highlands towards the Save River further west.

== Plant communities ==
Miombo woodlands predominate on higher ground, and include closed and open woodlands of dry-season deciduous trees, principally Brachystegia spiciformis, B. tamarindoides, and Uapaca kirkiana.

The drier lowlands are mopane woodland, with the trees Colophospermum mopane, Combretum zeyheri, Combretum mossambicense, and Combretum imberbe. Baobab (Adansonia digitata) is also common.

== Fauna ==
Large herbivores include black rhino (Diceros bicornis), bushbuck (Tragelaphus scriptus), common duiker (Sylvicapra grimmia), grysbok (Raphicerus melanotis), impala (Aepyceros melampus), klipspringer (Oreotragus oreotragus), greater kudu (Tragelaphus strepsiceros), warthog (Phacochoerus africanus), waterbuck (Kobus ellipsiprymnus), eland (Tragelaphus oryx), zebra (Equus quagga), and bushpig (Potamochoerus larvatus).

Carnivores include leopard (Panthera pardus), spotted hyena (Crocuta crocuta), and black-backed jackal (Canis mesomelas). Lions are occasionally seen in the wildlife area, but are not resident.

Black rhinoceros was reintroduced to the park in the 1990s.

Poaching has been a chronic problem in the safari area. Rampant poaching between 2006 and 2009 extirpated wildebeest (Connochaetes taurinus) from the safari area, and reduced populations of eland, waterbuck, and impala to fewer than 20 individuals. Black Rhinos numbered seven at reintroduction and had increased to 31 individuals, but recent poaching reduced the population to 13 individuals.
