= Montepuez River =

River in Mozambique

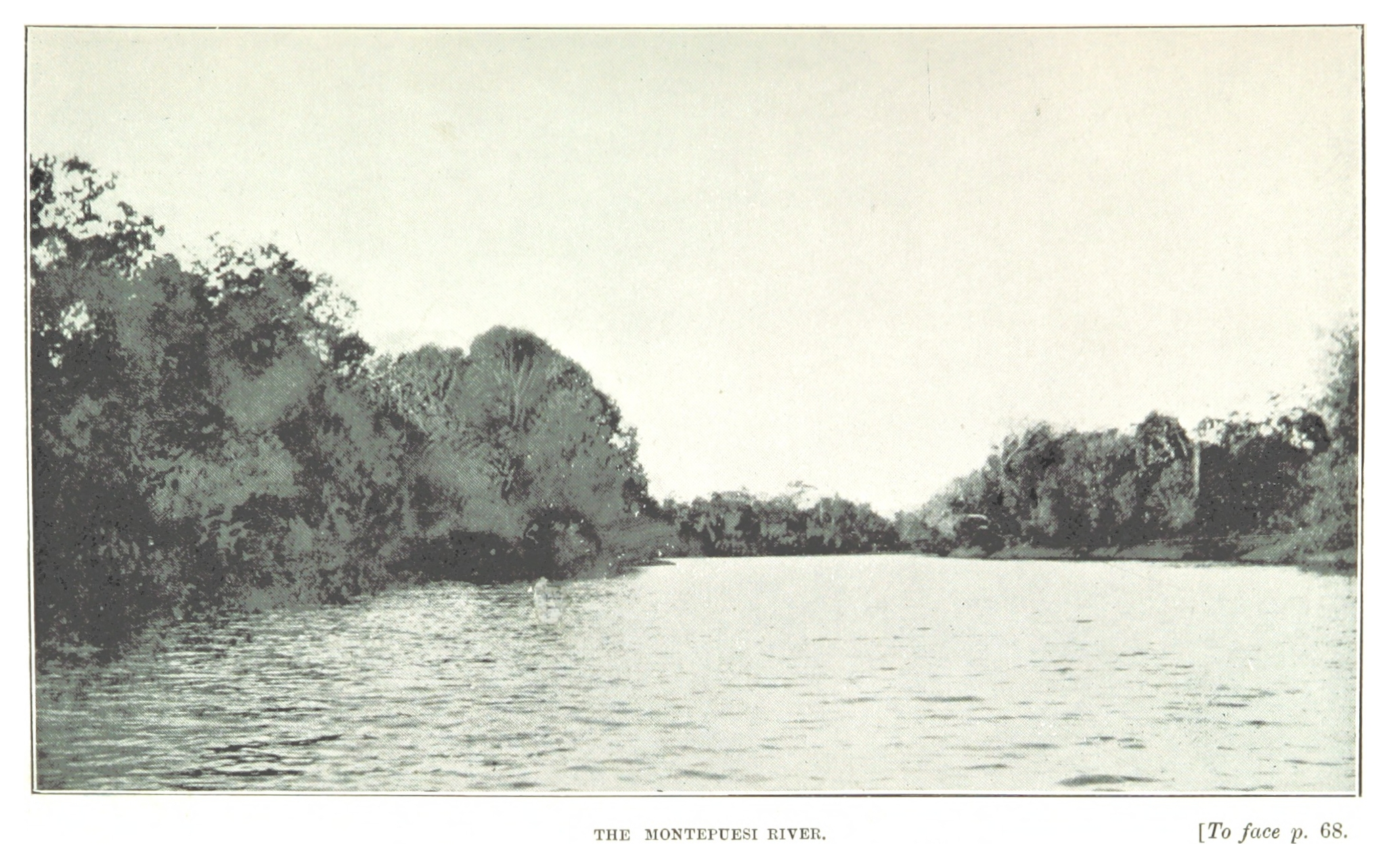
Montepuez River (1899)

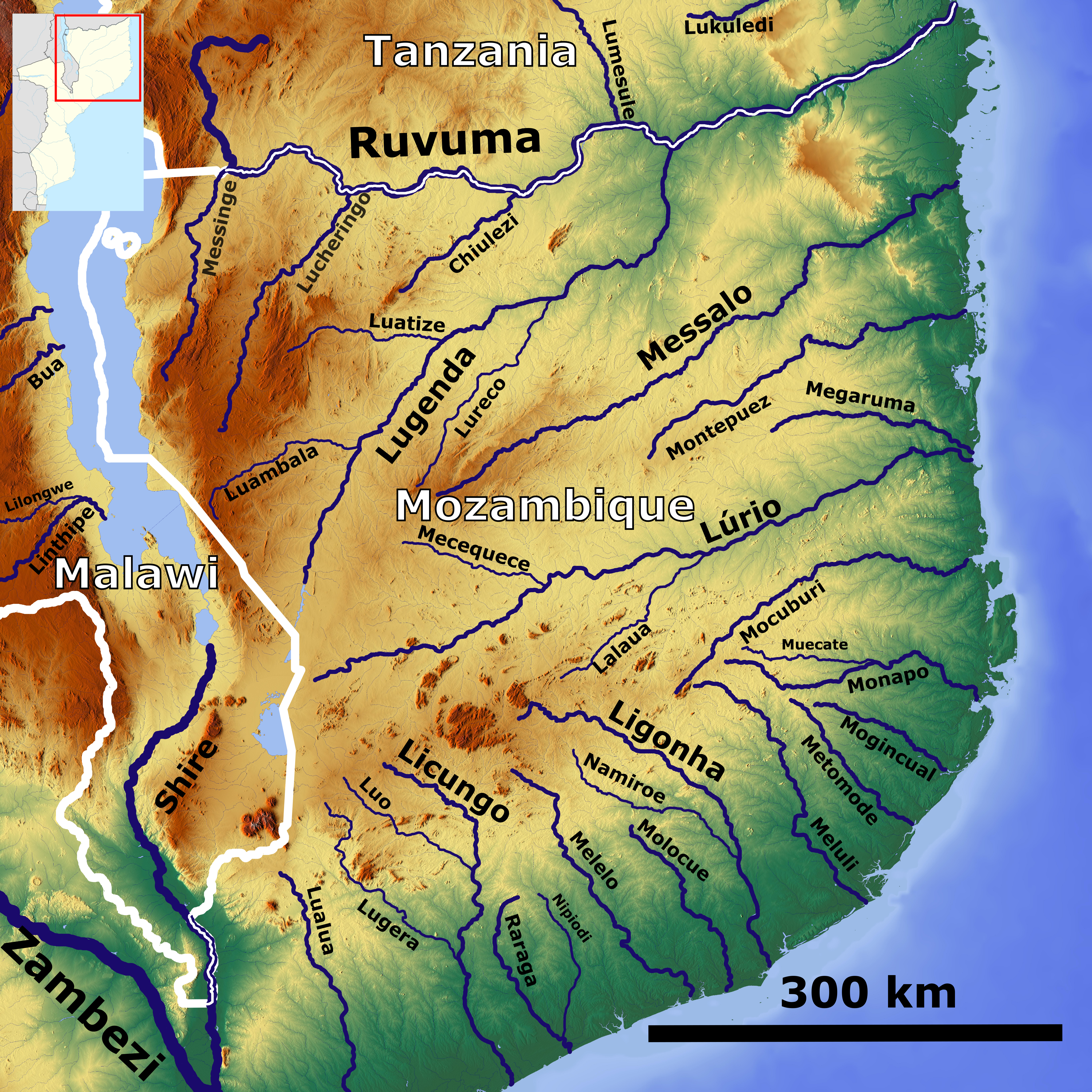
The Montepuez River in northern Mozambique (center right)

The Montepuez River is a river of Mozambique. It flows to the south of the Ruvuma River, and is characterised by seasonal flows and lined by swamps.
