= Maputaland coastal forest mosaic =

Subtropical moist broadleaf forest ecoregion on the east coast of southern Africa

- Map of the Maputaland coastal forest mosaic

Ecology
- Realm: Afrotropical
- Biome: tropical and subtropical moist broadleaf forests
- Borders: Kwazulu-Cape coastal forest mosaic; Southern Africa mangroves; Southern Zanzibar-Inhambane coastal forest mosaic; Zambezian and mopane woodlands

Geography
- Area: 29,961 km^{2} (11,568 mi^{2})
- Countries: Eswatini; Mozambique; South Africa
- Coordinates: 26.4°S 32.4°E

Conservation
- Conservation status: Critical/endangered
- Protected: 4,480 km^{2} (15%)

The Maputaland coastal forest mosaic is a subtropical moist broadleaf forest ecoregion on the Indian Ocean coast of Southern Africa. It covers an area of 29,961 square kilometres (11,568 sq mi) in southern Mozambique, Eswatini, and the KwaZulu-Natal Province of South Africa. Mozambique's capital Maputo lies within the ecoregion.

== Geography ==
The Maputaland coastal forest mosaic occupies the humid coastal strip along the Indian Ocean, inland to the Lebombo Mountains for much of its length. This is part of a strip of moist coastal forests that extend along Africa's Indian Ocean coast from southern Somalia to South Africa. The northern limit of the ecoregion is north of the mouth of the Limpopo River, near Xai-Xai in Mozambique, where the forests transition to the Southern Zanzibar-Inhambane coastal forest mosaic. The southern limit is near the St Lucia estuary in KwaZulu-Natal, where the Maputaland forests transition to the Kwazulu-Cape coastal forest mosaic.

== Climate ==
The ecoregion has a seasonally moist, tropical to subtropical climate. Rainfall ranges from 1000 mm per year near the coast to less than 600 mm per year inland. Most of the rain falls in the summer months. The coastal strip includes areas of wetland, the largest of which is Lake St. Lucia, the largest estuarine system in Africa.

== Flora ==
The ecoregion comprises a mosaic of many different plant communities, from the forest of the Lemombo Mountains through savanna, woodland, palm veld, grassland, sand dunes with patches of dense sand forest, and wetland habitats. The flora of the region includes a number of endemic species.

== Fauna ==
The 100 species of mammal found here include the African elephant (Loxodonta africana), now contained in reserves along the coast, and large predators, of which leopard (Panthera pardus) are the most common. More than 470 bird species are found here, of which 4 are endemic and 43 near-endemic.

== Threats and preservation ==
The South African portion of this region is under threat due to increasing population and the introduction of foreign plant species such as the shrub Chromolaena odorata, Australian acacias, guava (Psidium guajava), pines and eucalyptus. In Mozambique this coast is not heavily populated but the area is affected by forestry and other projects including the Pongolapoort Dam and irrigation schemes.

According to the World Wide Fund for Nature, 14% of the ecoregion is protected. Protected areas include iSimangaliso Wetland Park (formerly Greater St. Lucia Wetland Park – 3,280 km^{2}) in KwaZulu-Natal, and Maputo Special Reserve (900 km^{2}) in Mozambique, which has lost most of its large mammals and is being increasingly settled. There are plans to link the Maputo Reserve with Tembe Elephant Park of South Africa in the large cross-border Lubombo Transfrontier Conservation Area, which would allow elephants to roam more freely. There is little game left along this coast outside the reserves.

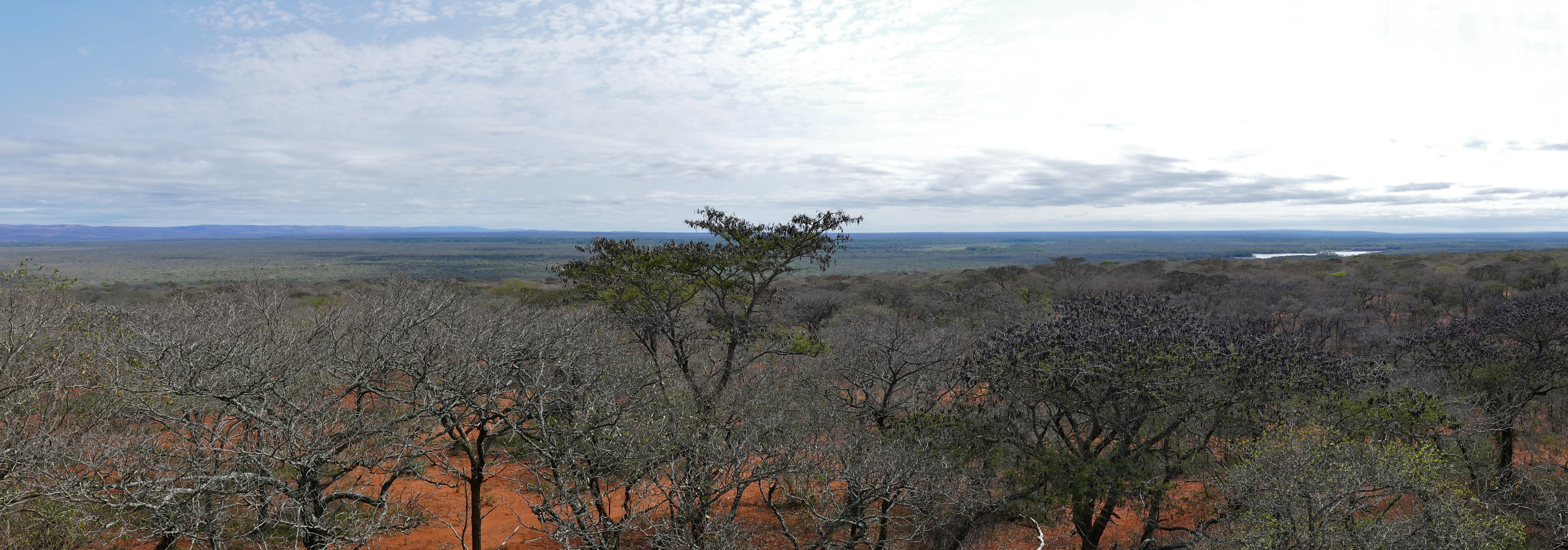
Woodlands of Ndumo Game Reserve
