= Southern miombo woodlands =

Ecoregion in southeastern Africa

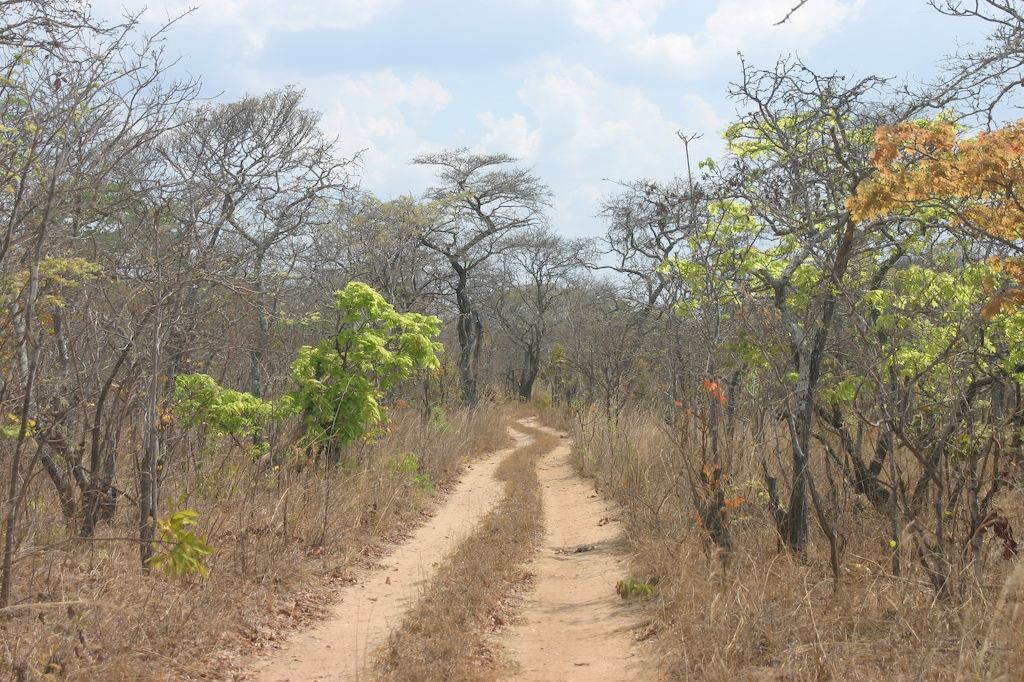
- Miombo woodland in Kasungu National Park, Malawi

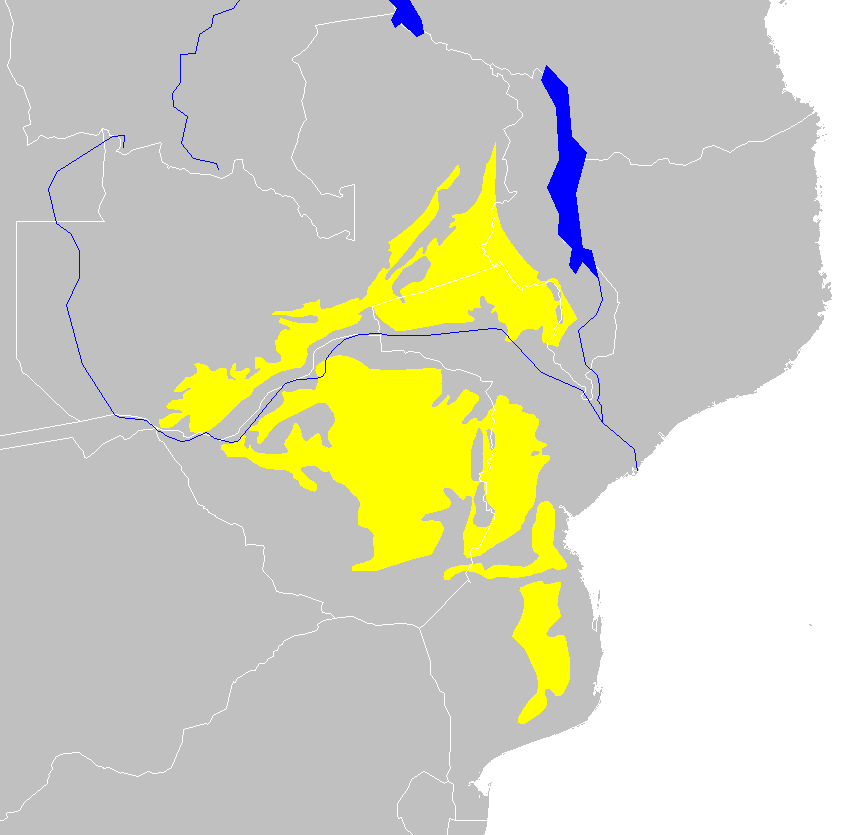
- Map of the Southern miombo woodlands ecoregion

Ecology
- Realm: Afrotropical
- Biome: Tropical and subtropical grasslands, savannas, and shrublands

Geography
- Area: 408,200 km^{2} (157,600 mi^{2})
- Countries: Malawi; Mozambique; Zambia; Zimbabwe

Conservation
- Conservation status: vulnerable
- Protected: 22.5%

The Southern miombo woodlands is a tropical grasslands and woodlands ecoregion extending across portions of Malawi, Mozambique, Zambia, and Zimbabwe.

It is one of four miombo woodlands ecoregions that span the African continent south of the Congo forests and East African savannas.

== Geography ==
The Eastern miombo woodlands covers the hills and low plateaus in the watersheds of the Zambezi and Limpopo rivers, north and south of the Zambezi, and north and east of the Limpopo. The drier Zambezian and mopane woodlands occupy the lowlands along the Zambezi and its major tributaries, including the Shire and Lugenda, and the lowlands of the Limpopo. To the north and northwest, the Eastern miombo woodlands transition to the Central Zambezian miombo woodlands. To the southwest, they transition to the Southern Africa bushveld. The Southern Zanzibar-Inhambane coastal forest mosaic bounds the ecoregion on the southeast, along the Indian Ocean coast.

Zambia's capital Lusaka and Zimbabwe's capital Harare are in the ecoregion.

== Flora ==
The predominant vegetation is savanna and open-canopy woodland. The predominant trees are species of Brachystegia (a.k.a. miombo), Julbernardia, and Isoberlinia.

Some eastward-facing mountains intercept winds from the Indian Ocean, and orographic rainfall sustain pockets of moist evergreen forest. These include the Moribane forest in Mozambique, and the Haroni and Rusitu reserves and Chirinda forest in Zimbabwe. The flora is similar to the coastal evergreen forests, and canopy trees include Newtonia buchananii, Celtis mildbraedii, and Khaya anthotheca.

== Fauna ==
The ecoregion is home to several large grazing mammals, including the African bush elephant (Loxodonta africana), black rhinoceros (Diceros bicornis), white rhinoceros (Ceratotherium simum), African buffalo (Synerus caffer), roan antelope (Hippotragus equinus), sable antelope (Hippotragus niger), Lichtenstein's hartebeest (Alcelaphus buselaphus lichtensteinii), southern reedbuck (Redunca arundium), greater kudu (Tragelaphus strepsiceros), common eland (Taurotragus oryx), and common tsessebe (Damaliscus lunatus). These large grazers generally have a low population density and large ranges, except for the roan antelope, which occurs in higher densities.

Larger carnivores include lion (Panthera leo), leopard (Panthera pardus), cheetah (Acinonyx jubatus), spotted hyena (Crocuta crocuta), African wild dog (Lycaon pictus), caracal (Caracal caracal), and side-striped jackal (Lupulella adusta).

== Climate ==
This ecoregion is believed to be a biodiversity hotspot, and one which is particularly vulnerable to climate change. In the more intense climate change scenarios where globally averaged warming reaches 4.5 °C (8.1 °F), around 90% of Miombo's amphibian species, 86% of its bird species and 80% of its mammal species are predicted to disappear from the area.

== Protected areas and conservation ==
22.5% of the ecoregion is in protected areas. Protected areas which cover part of the ecoregion include:

- Kasungu National Park in Malawi
- Zinave National Park in Mozambique
- Lower Zambezi, Lukusuzi, and South Luangwa national parks in Zambia
- Chizarira and Matusadona national parks and Chipinge Safari Area in Zimbabwe
