= Monte Muambe =

Mountain in Mozambique

- Location within Mozambique

Highest point
- Elevation: 780 m (2,560 ft)
- Coordinates: 16°19′23″S 34°5′39″E

Geography
- Location: Mozambique

Geology
- Last eruption: Unknown

Monte Muambe is an inactive volcano located east of Moatize in the Tete Province of Mozambique. The volcano is 780 meters high, has a 6 km external diameter with a caldera some 200m deep. The caldera is largely composed of carbonatites, rich in both blue and yellow fluorite. The Zambezi Valley Spatial Development Initiative estimates Monte Muambe has reserves of 1.1 trillion tonnes of the mineral in a pure form.
