= Gorongosa National Park =

National park in Mozambique

- IUCN category II (national park)
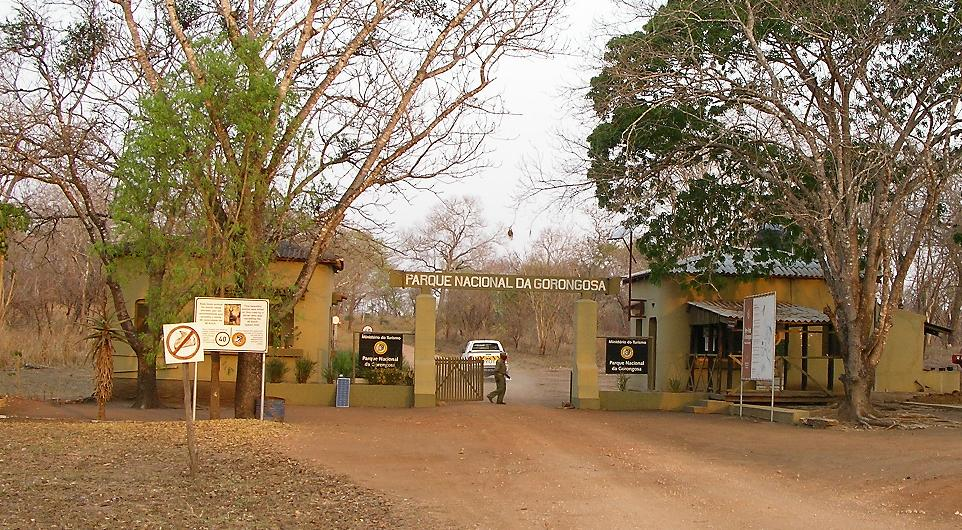
- Entrance to Gorongosa National Park
- Location: Mozambique
- Coordinates: 18.766°S 34.500°E
- Area: 3,770 km^{2} (1,460 sq mi)
- Gorongosa National Park (Mozambique)

Gorongosa National Park is at the southern end of the Great African Rift Valley in the heart of central Mozambique, Southeast Africa. The more than 4,000 km^{2} (1,500 sq mi) park comprises the valley floor and parts of surrounding plateaus. Rivers originating on nearby Mount Gorongosa at 1,863 m (6,112 ft) water the plain.

Seasonal flooding and waterlogging of the valley, which is composed of a mosaic of soil types, creates a variety of distinct ecosystems. Grasslands are dotted with patches of acacia trees, savannah, dry forest on sands and seasonally rain-filled pans, and termite hill thickets. The plateaus contain miombo and montane forests and a spectacular rain forest at the base of a series of limestone gorges.

This combination of unique features at one time supported some of the densest wildlife populations in all of Africa, including charismatic carnivores, herbivores, and over 500 bird species. But large mammal numbers were reduced by as much as 95% and ecosystems were stressed during the Mozambican Civil War (1977-1992).

The Carr Foundation has teamed with the Government of Mozambique to protect and restore the ecosystem of Gorongosa National Park and to develop an ecotourism industry to benefit local communities.

== History ==
=== Hunting reserve: 1920–1959 ===
The first official act to protect the Gorongosa region, Portuguese Mozambique, came in 1920 when the Mozambique Company ordered 1,000 square km set aside as a hunting reserve for company administrators and their guests. Chartered by the government of Portugal, the Mozambique Company controlled all of central Mozambique between 1891 and 1940.

In 1935, Mr. Jose Henriques Coimbra was named warden and Jose Ferreira became the reserve's first guide. That same year the Mozambique Company enlarged the reserve to 3,200 square km to protect habitat for nyala and black rhino, both highly prized hunting trophies. By 1940 the reserve had become so popular that a new headquarters and tourist camp was built on the floodplain near the Mussicadzi River. It was abandoned two years later due to heavy flooding in the rainy season. Lions then occupied the abandoned building and it became a popular tourist attraction for many years, known as Casa dos Leões (Lion House).

=== National park: 1960–1980 ===
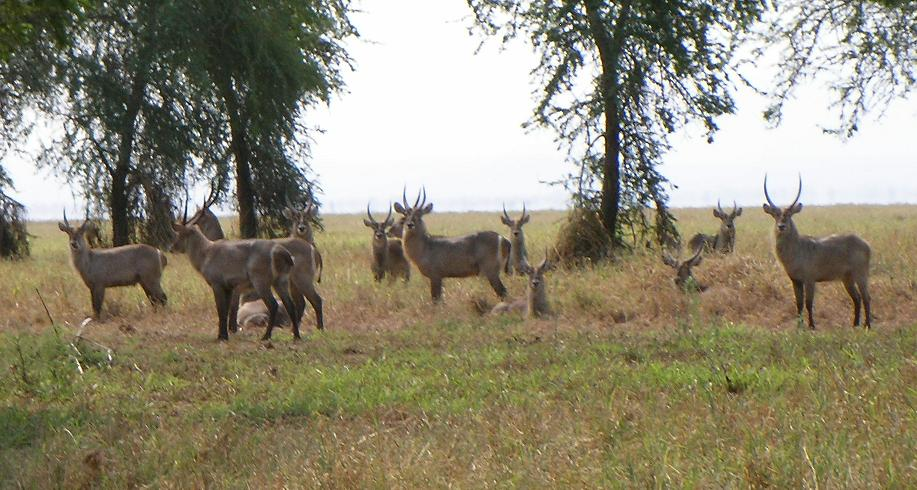
Waterbucks

Many improvements to the new park's trails, roads, and buildings ensued. Between 1963 and 1965 Chitengo camp was expanded to accommodate 100 overnight guests. By the late 1960s, it had two swimming pools, a bar and banquet hall, a restaurant serving 300-400 meals a day, a post office, a petrol station, a first-aid clinic, and a shop selling local handicrafts.

The late 1960s also saw the first comprehensive scientific studies of the park, led by Armando Rosinha, Director of Gorongosa, and Kenneth Tinley, an Australian ecologist. In the first-ever aerial survey, Tinley and his team counted about 200 lions, 2,200 elephants, 14,000 African buffalo, 5,500 wildebeest, 3,000 zebras, 3,500 waterbuck, 2,000 impala, 3,500 hippos, and herds of eland, sable antelope and hartebeest numbering more than 500.

Tinley also discovered that many people and most of the wildlife living in and around the park depended on one river, the Vundudzi, which originated on the slopes of the nearby Mount Gorongosa. Because the mountain was outside the park's boundaries, Tinley proposed expanding them to include it as a key element in a "Greater Gorongosa Ecosystem" of about 8,200 square kilometers. He and other scientists and conservationists were disappointed in 1966 when the government reduced the park's area to 3,770 square kilometers.

Meanwhile, Mozambique was in the midst of a war for independence launched in 1964 by the Mozambique Liberation Front (Frelimo). Fortunately, the war had little impact on Gorongosa National Park until 1972, when a Portuguese company and members of the Provincial Volunteer Organization were stationed there to protect it. Even then, not much damage occurred, although some soldiers hunted illegally. In 1974, the Carnation Revolution in Lisbon overthrew the Estado Novo regime. When the new Portuguese authorities decided to abdicate power in their overseas territories, Mozambique became an independent republic. In 1976, a year after Mozambique won its independence from Portugal, aerial surveys of the park and adjacent Zambezi River delta counted thousands of elephants in the region and a healthy population of lions, numbering in the hundreds. It was the largest lion population recorded in the greater Gorongosa region to date.

=== Civil war: 1981–1994 ===
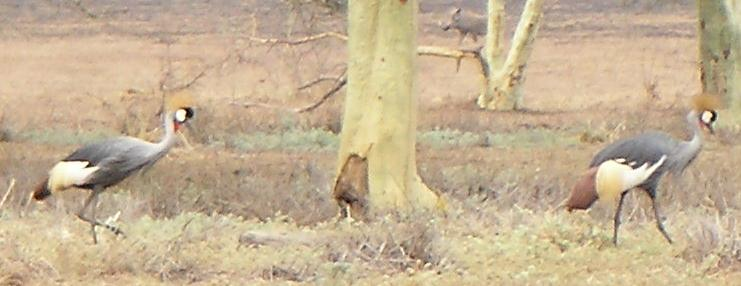
Grey crowned cranes

In 1977, the People's Republic of Mozambique, under the leadership of Samora Machel declared itself a Marxist-Leninist state. A rebel army known as RENAMO sprung up to oppose the new government. Feeling threatened by FRELIMO's new one-party government in Mozambique, neighbouring Rhodesia and South Africa began arming and supplying RENAMO. Once Rhodesia became Zimbabwe in 1980, direct support for RENAMO came from South Africa with the intention of destabilizing Machel's government. Initially dismissed by Machel as a group of "armed bandits", RENAMO's war developed into a full-scale national threat by 1981. In December 1981 the Mozambican National Resistance (MNR, or RENAMO) fighters attacked the Chitengo campsite and kidnapped several staff members, including two foreign scientists. The Mozambican Civil War lasted from 1977 to 1992.

The violence increased in and around the park after that. In 1983 the park was shut down and abandoned. For the next nine years Gorongosa was the scene of frequent battles between opposing forces. Fierce hand-to-hand fighting and aerial bombing destroyed buildings and roads. The park's large mammals suffered huge losses. Both sides in the conflict slaughtered hundreds of elephants for their ivory, selling it to buy arms and supplies. Half of Gorongosa's elephants evolved to be tuskless. Hungry soldiers shot many more thousands of zebras, wildebeest, African buffalo, and other ungulates. Lions survived the war, but several species of top carnivore—leopard, African wild dog, and spotted hyena—were driven locally extinct.

A cease-fire agreement ended the civil war in 1992 but widespread hunting in the park continued for at least two more years. By that time many large mammal populations — including elephants, hippos, buffalo, zebras and lions — had been reduced by more than 95 percent. An aerial survey conducted in 1994 over 68 km^{2} of the park counted just 5 elephants, 6 waterbuck, 3 zebra, 12 reedbuck, and 1 oribi; buffalo and sable were not detected in aerial surveys until 2001, wildebeest until 2007, and eland until 2010.

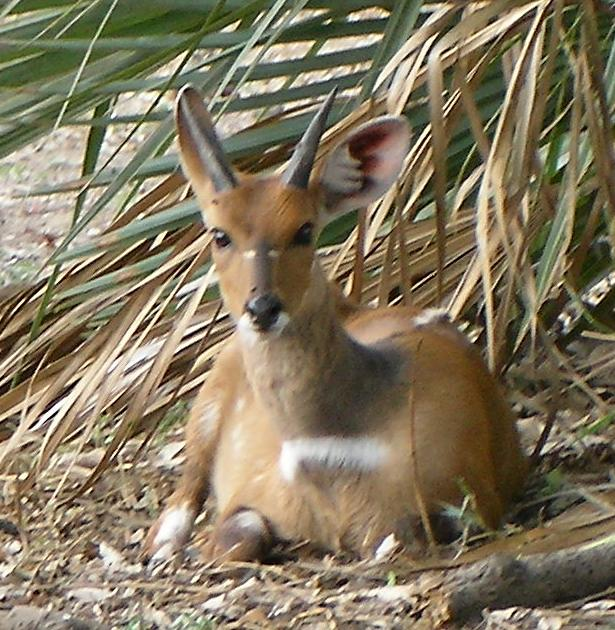
Young male bushbuck

=== Post-war: 1995–2003 ===
A preliminary effort to rebuild Gorongosa National Park's infrastructure and restore its wildlife began in 1994 when the African Development Bank (ADB) started work on a rehabilitation plan with assistance from the European Union and the International Union for Conservation of Nature (IUCN). Fifty new staff were hired, most of them former soldiers.

=== Restoration: 2004-present ===
In 2004 the Government of Mozambique and the US-based Carr Foundation agreed to work together to rebuild the park's infrastructure, restore its wildlife populations and spur local economic development—opening an important new chapter in the park's history.

Since the beginning of the project, aerial surveys of wildlife have shown sharp increases in the number of large animals.

In the aftermath of the 2019 Cyclone Idai, park rangers conducted rescue missions using their helicopter, boat, and tractor. According to Gorongosa Project president Gregory Carr, the park was "right in the middle of the impacted area". Roughly half the park was flooded due to the cyclone, but impacts to wildlife were expected to be minimal as the animals would be able to migrate to higher ground. The protection of this area was cited as a reason that the impacts of the flood on the human population were less severe, as the protected wilderness area can moderate the flow of water.

In March 2018, a leopard was captured on a park camera after 14 years, and additional leopards were reintroduced starting in 2020. In July 2018 and November 2019, two packs of African wild dogs from South Africa were reintroduced. Spotted hyena reintroductions began in July 2022.

== Ecology ==
=== Geology ===
The park is in a 4,000-square-km section of the Great African Rift Valley system. The Rift extends from Ethiopia to central Mozambique. Massive tectonic shifts began forming the Rift about 30 million years ago. Other warpings, uplifts, and sinkings of the Earth's crust over millennia shaped the plateaus on both sides and the mountain to the west. Mozambique's tropical savanna climate, with an annual cycle of wet and dry seasons, has added another factor to the complex equation: constant change in soil moisture that varies with elevation. The valley is located 21 km west of Mount Gorongosa at 14 m above sea level.

=== Hydrology ===
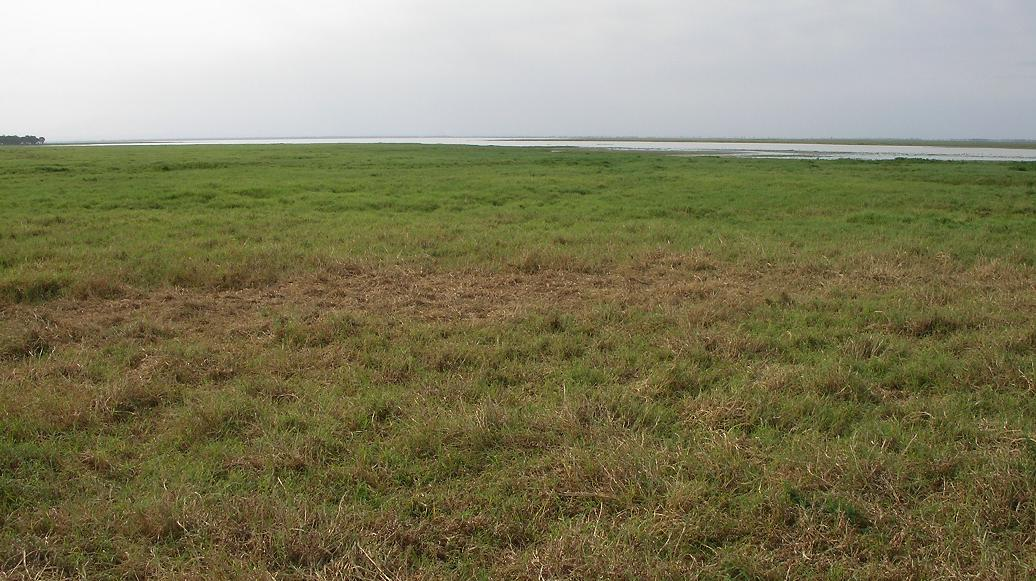
Lake Urema in the dry season (late September)

Gorongosa National Park protects a vast ecosystem defined and shaped by the rivers that flow into Lake Urema. The Nhandungue crosses the Barue Plateau on its way down to the valley. The Nhandue and Mucombeze come from the north. Mount Gorongosa contributes the Vunduzi. Several smaller rivers pour down off the Cheringoma Plateau. Together they comprise the Urema Catchment, an area of about 7,850 square km.

Lake Urema is located in the middle of the valley, about three-quarters of the way down from the Park's northern boundary. The Muaredzi River, flowing from the Cheringoma Plateau, deposits sediments near the outlet of the lake slowing its drainage. This "plug" causes the Urema River to greatly expand in the rainy season. Water that makes its way past this alluvial fan flows down the Urema River to the Pungue and into the Indian Ocean. In the flooded rainy season, water backs up into the valley and out onto the plains, covering as much as 200 square km in many years. During some dry seasons, the lake's waters shrink to as little as 10 square km. This constant expansion and retraction of the floodplains, amidst a patchwork of savanna, woodland, and thickets, creates a complex mosaic of smaller ecosystems that support a greater abundance and diversity of wildlife than anywhere else in the park.

=== Vegetation ===
Scientists have identified three main vegetation types supporting the Gorongosa ecosystem's wealth of wildlife. Seventy-six percent is savanna — combinations of grasses and woody species that favor well-drained soils. Fourteen percent is woodlands — several kinds of forest and thickets. The rest is grasslands subjected to harsh seasonal conditions that prevent trees from growing. All three types are found throughout the system, with many different sub-types and varieties. Tree cover increased throughout the park in the decades following the Mozambican Civil War, likely due to the dramatic declines of large herbivores such as elephants during that period.

Mount Gorongosa has rainforests, montane grasslands, riverine forests along its rivers, and forests and savanna woodlands at lower elevations. Both plateaus are covered with a kind of closed-canopy savanna, widespread in southern Africa, called "miombo", after the Swahili word for the dominant tree, a member of the genus Brachystegia. About 20 percent of the valley's grasslands are flooded much of the year.

=== Mount Gorongosa ===
In July 2010 the government of Mozambique and the Gorongosa Restoration Project (headed by the U.S.–based Carr Foundation) announced that Gorongosa Mountain would be added to the park bringing its total size to 4067 km^{2}. This designation has contributed to an ongoing conflict between long-term residents of the mountain and representatives of the park.

=== Wildlife ===
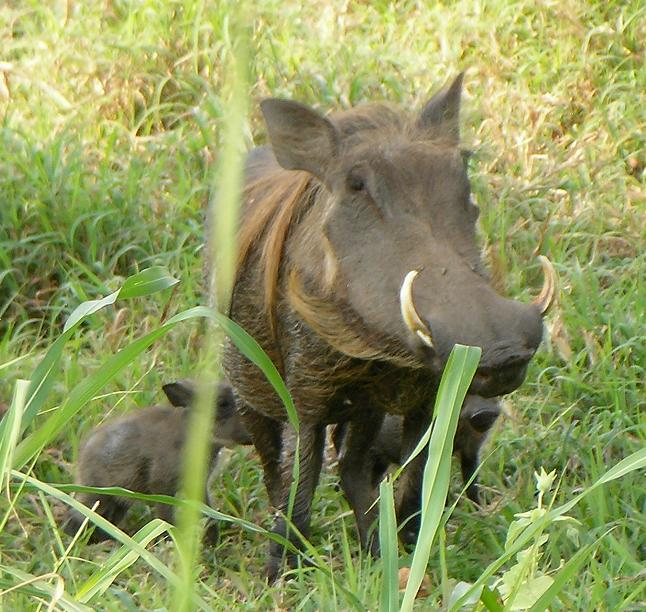
Warthogs

Gorongosa National Park is home to a large diversity of animals and plants, some of which are found nowhere else in the world. The park includes termite mounds used as shade by Cape bushbuck and kudu.

== See also ==
- Ecotourism in Africa
- Jen Guyton
