= Southern Zanzibar–Inhambane coastal forest mosaic =

Tropical moist broadleaf forest ecoregion of eastern Africa

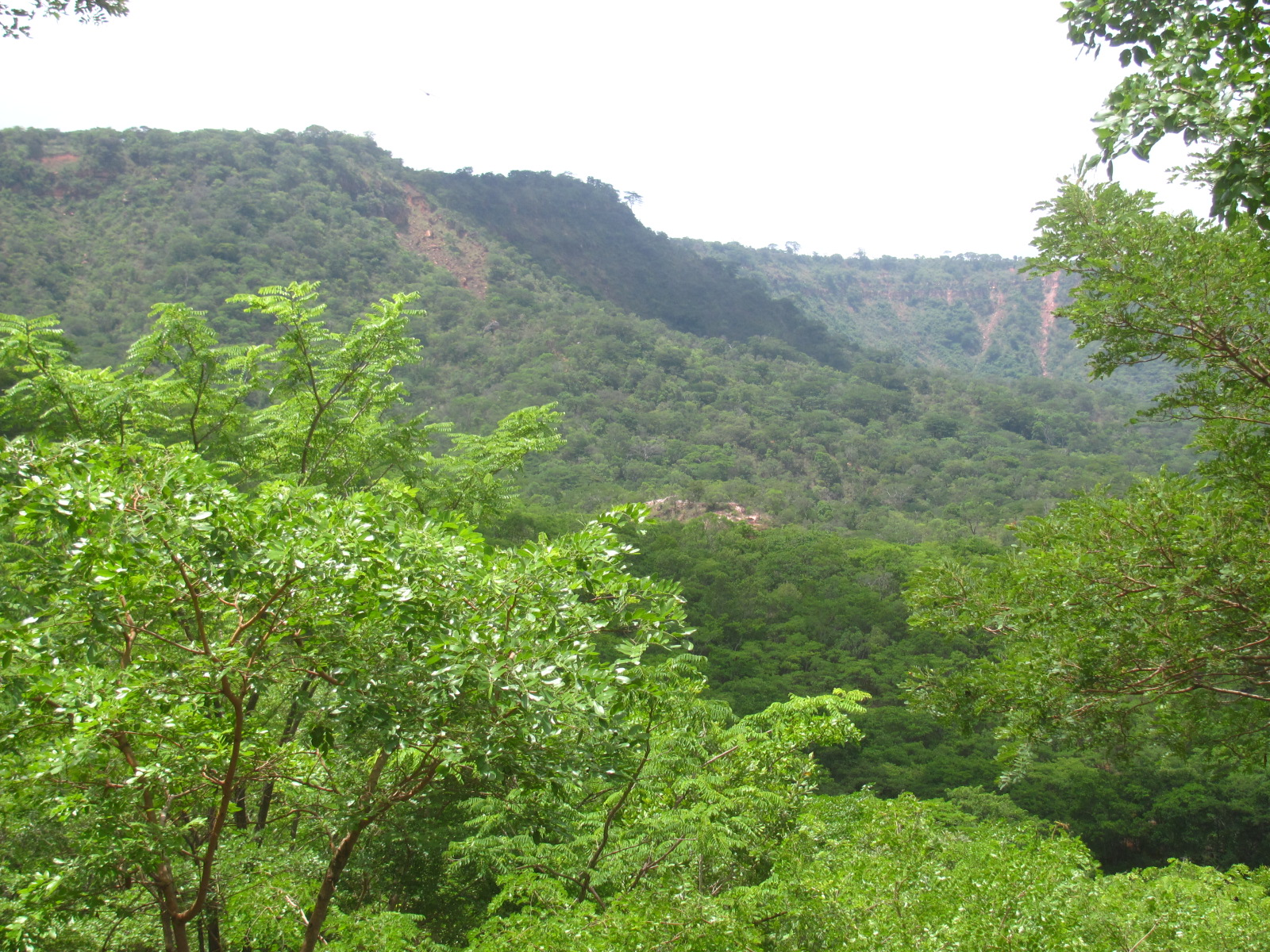
- Makonde Plateau escarpment, at the northern edge of the ecoregion

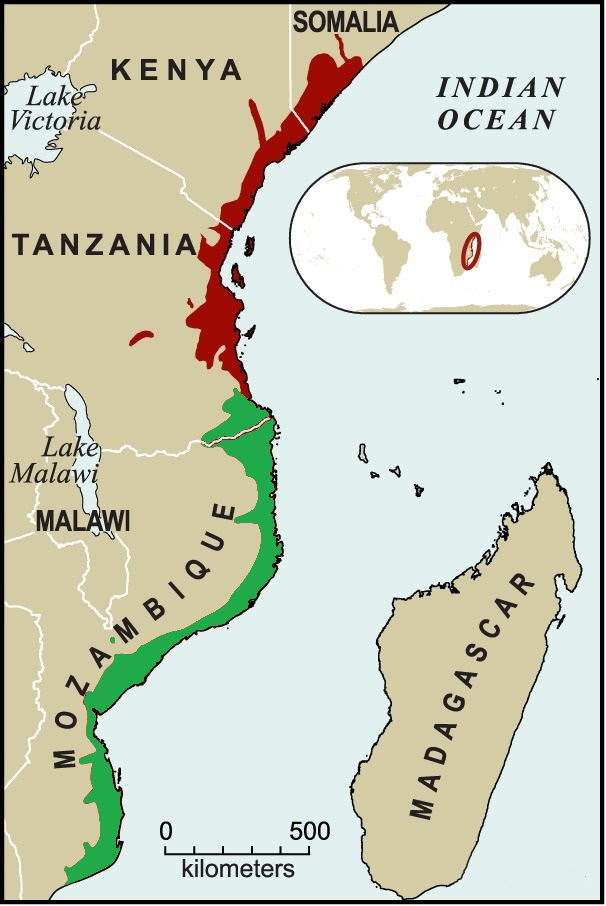
- Northern Zanzibar–Inhambane coastal forest mosaic Southern Zanzibar–Inhambane coastal forest mosaic

Ecology
- Realm: Afrotropical
- Biome: Tropical and subtropical moist broadleaf forests
- Borders: List: East African mangroves; Eastern miombo woodlands; Maputaland coastal forest mosaic; Northern Zanzibar–Inhambane coastal forest mosaic; Southern miombo woodlands; Zambezian coastal flooded savanna; Zambezian and mopane woodlands

Geography
- Area: 144,800 km^{2} (55,900 sq mi)
- Countries: Mozambique; Tanzania
- Coordinates: 16.25°S 39.7°E

Conservation
- Conservation status: Critical/endangered
- Global 200: Coastal forests of eastern Africa
- Protected: 14.24%

The Southern Zanzibar–Inhambane coastal forest mosaic, also known as the Southern Swahili coastal forests and woodlands, is a tropical moist broadleaf forest ecoregion of eastern Africa. It is a southern variation of Northern Zanzibar-Inhambane coastal forest mosaic. The ecoregion supports habitats of forest, savanna and swamps. The southern portion of the ecoregion is not as well studied due to the 1977-1992 civil war in Mozambique.

== Geography ==
The ecoregion extends along the coast of Tanzania and Mozambique, from Tanzania's Lukuledi River south almost the whole way to the mouth of the Limpopo River.

It is mostly coastal, generally within 50 km of the Indian Ocean. It encompasses coastal lowlands, rolling hills, and isolated plateaus and inselbergs, including the Rondo and Makonde plateaus in southern Tanzania, the Mueda Plateau in northern Mozambique.

It includes some isolated mountainous enclaves further inland, including Mount Chiperone, Mount Mabu, Mount Morrumbala, Mount Namuli, and Mount Tumbine in northern Mozambique, and the southeastern slopes of the Eastern Highlands, including Moribane forest. The mountains intercept humid southwesterly winds from the Indian Ocean, which form clouds and rain and create a cooler, wetter climate than the surrounding lowlands. These mountains are home to lowland evergreen forests with a similar flora to the coastal lowland forests, and higher-elevation montane forests, woodlands, grasslands, and heathlands which are home to many Afromontane species. The WWF scheme follows Frank White's 1983 "Vegetation Map of Africa" by including these inland mountains in the coastal forest mosaic ecoregion. Other researchers, including Jonathan Timberlake of Kew Gardens, maintain that the flora and fauna of Northern Mozambique's interior inselbergs, especially at higher elevations, have greater affinity with the Afromontane Eastern Arc forests. Bayliss et al. concluded that the northern Mozambican inselbergs, together with the Mulanje Massif of southern Malawi, constitute a separate South East Africa Montane Archipelago ecoregion.

The ecoregion is bounded on the east by the Indian Ocean. To the north, it abuts the Northern Zanzibar-Inhambane coastal forest mosaic. It transitions to drier open woodlands to the west – the Eastern miombo woodlands at the northern end, the Zambezian and mopane woodlands in the central portion, and the Southern miombo woodlands at the southern end. To the south, it borders the Maputaland coastal forest mosaic. It also includes some small offshore islands in Mozambique, including the Quirimbas Islands and Bazarruto Archipelago.

== Climate ==
The climate is tropical in the northern portion, becoming sub-tropical at the southern end. In the area around Lindi in Tanzania there is one long dry season and one wet season. Rainfall is 800–1000 mm per year, and is higher on some of the plateaus and mountains. The climate is similar in the Mozambican portion, although rainfall is lower (800 mm) in northern Mozambique, which is in the rain shadow of Madagascar. Mean maximum temperatures are 30-27 °C in the north and 24 °C in the south, and mean minimum temperature is 18-15 °C throughout the ecoregion.

== Flora ==
The vegetation of the ecoregion is a mosaic of tropical moist forest, tropical dry forest, thicket, miombo woodland, grassland, and wetland.

Dry forests and thickets are found in the northern portion of the ecoregion. This region, comprising southeastern Tanzania and northeastern Mozambique, is in the rain shadow of Madagascar, and rainfall is lower (less than 1000 mm annually) than in the coastal forests to the north and south. The dry forests have a closed canopy, with a large proportion of deciduous species that lose their leaves in the long and hot dry season. Dense thickets form where dry forests have been disturbed by human activity. Dry forests are typically found on soils derived from iron-rich sandstone and conglomerates of the Mikindani Formation. Typical dry forest tree species in Mozambique's Cabo Delgado Province include Manilkara sansibarensis, Warneckea sansibarica, Baphia macrocalyx, and Pteleopsis myrtifolia. 738 plant species were identified from the dry forests of Cabo Delgado. The plant families with the most species include Rubiaceae with 84 species, Leguminaceae subfamilies Papilionoideae (43 species), Mimosoideae (29 species), and Caesalpinioideae (24 species), and Euphorbiaceae (41 species), Apocynaceae (28 species), and Lamiaceae (28 species). Human activity has fragmented the dry forests into small patches, and it is estimated that 80% have been lost in the last 100 to 150 years.

The Rondo, Chitoa, and Makonde plateaus and adjacent coastal lowlands of southeastern Tanzania, at the northern end of the ecoregion, are home to at least 76 endemic species of plants, along with several endemic species and subspecies of animals. The region is known as the Lindi sub-centre of endemism.

There are fewer known endemics in the Mozambican portion of the ecoregion. Cola clavata is an endangered tree endemic to the coastal forests of Sofala and Zambezia provinces in central Mozambique.

== Fauna ==
Large mammals include the African bush elephant (Loxodonta africana), African buffalo (Syncerus caffer), sable antelope (Hippotragus niger), roan antelope (H. equinus), and Lichtenstein's hartebeest (Alcelaphus buselaphus lichtensteinii), which also inhabit the adjacent Eastern miombo woodlands. Vincent's bush squirrel (Paraxerus vincenti) is endemic to Mount Namuli in Mozambique.

The northernmost portion of the ecoregion around Lindi in Southeastern Tanzania, including coastal forests and the Rondo, Chitoa, and Makonde plateaus, is home to several endemic and limited range species. These include the southern population of the primate Rondo dwarf galago (Paragalago rondoensis), the endemic birds Reichenow's batis (Batis reichenowi) and an endemic subspecies of green barbet (Stactolaema olivacea hylophona), the reptiles Melanoceps rondoensis, Scolecoseps litapoensis, Typhlops rondoensis, and Chirindia rondoensis, and two endemic butterfly species. The forests of the Lindi region are also home to populations of lemon dove (Columba larvata), green-headed oriole (Oriolus chlorocephalus), and black-fronted bushshrike (Chlorophoneus nigrifrons), species generally found in montane forests further inland.

The Namuli apalis (Apalis lynesi) is a bird endemic to Mount Namuli.

The skinks Scelotes duttoni, Scelotes insularis, and Lygosoma lanceolatum are endemic to the Bazaruto Archipelago.

== Protected areas ==
14.24% of the ecoregion is in protected areas. Protected areas within the ecoregion include:

- Rondo Forest Reserve, Tanzania
- Matibane Forest Reserve, Mozambique
- Inhamitanga Forest Reserve, Mozambique
- Nhapacué Forest Reserve, Mozambique
- Bazaruto National Park, Mozambique
- Baixo Pinda Forest Reserve, Mozambique
- Caça do Gilé Wildlife Reserve (part), Mozambique
- Gorongosa National Park (part), Mozambique
- Moribane Forest Reserve, Mozambique
- Pomene National Reserve, Mozambique
- Quirimbas National Park, Mozambique

== See also ==
- Tropical and subtropical dry broadleaf forests
- Tropical and subtropical grasslands, savannas, and shrublands
