= Zambezian and mopane woodlands =

Tropical and subtropical ecoregion of southeastern Africa

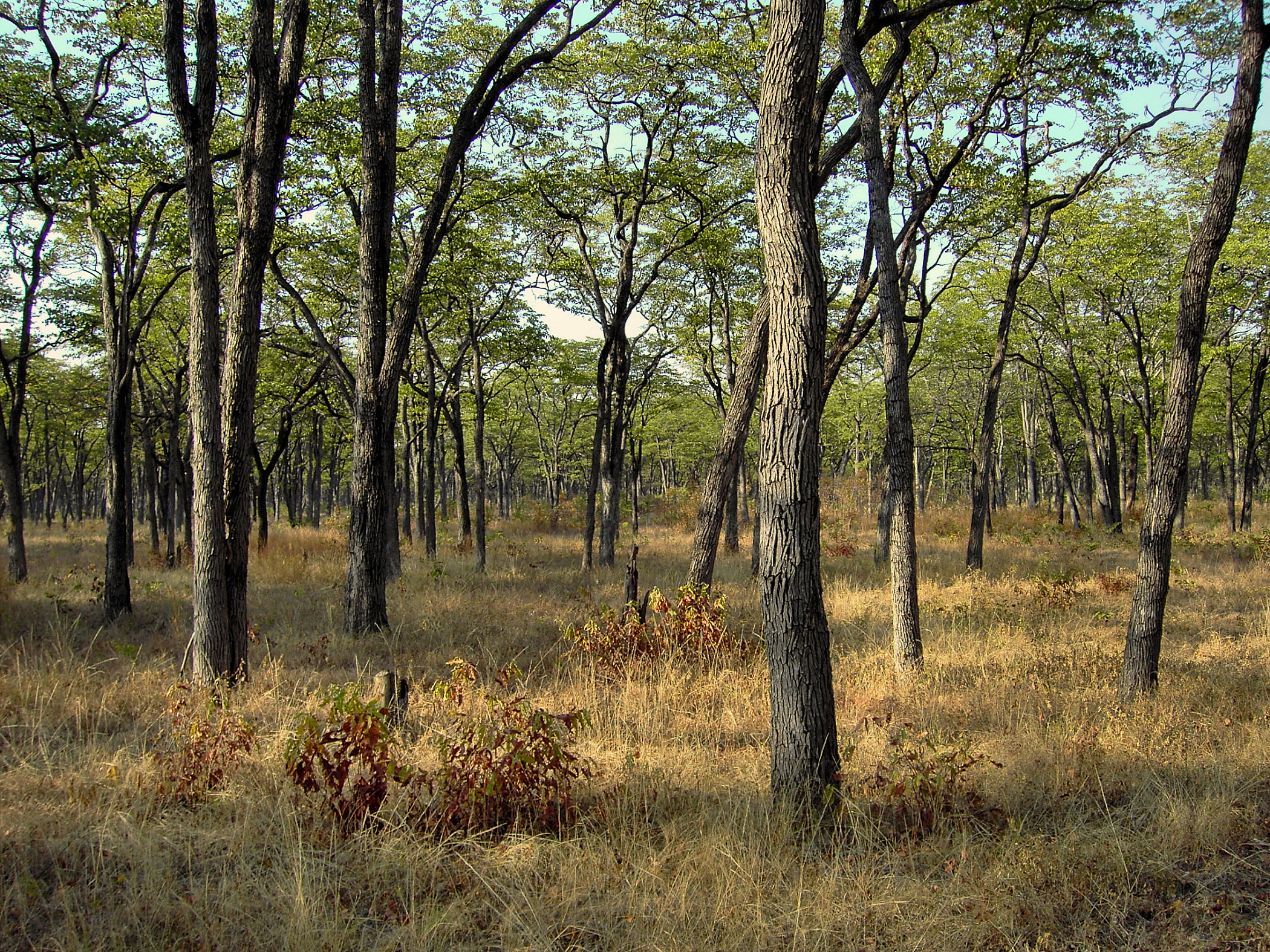
- Mopane woodland in South Luangwa Valley, Zambia

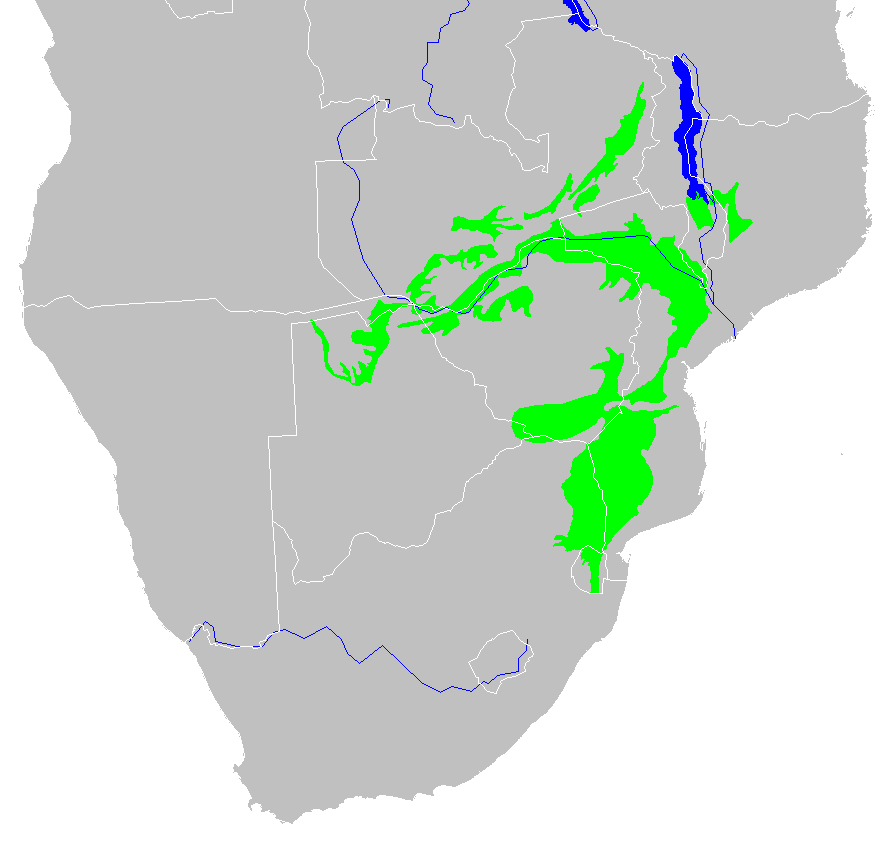
- Map of the Zambezian and mopane woodlands ecoregion

Ecology
- Realm: Afrotropic
- Biome: Tropical and subtropical grasslands, savannas, and shrublands

Geography
- Area: 473,200 km^{2} (182,700 sq mi)
- Countries: Botswana, Eswatini, Malawi, Mozambique, Namibia, South Africa, Zambia, and Zimbabwe

Conservation
- Conservation status: relatively stable/intact

The Zambezian and mopane woodlands is a tropical and subtropical grasslands, savannas, and shrublands ecoregion of southeastern Africa.

The ecoregion is characterized by the mopane tree (Colophospermum mopane), and extends across portions of Botswana, Malawi, Mozambique, Namibia, South Africa, Eswatini, Zambia, and Zimbabwe, including the lower basins of the Zambezi and Limpopo rivers.

The more humid Southern Zanzibar-Inhambane coastal forest mosaic and Maputaland coastal forest mosaic ecoregions lie between the Zambezian and mopane woodlands and the Indian Ocean. The Zambezian and mopane woodlands lie generally at a lower elevation, and has lower rainfall, than the neighboring miombo woodlands ecoregions, which occupy the plateaus and escarpments above the river lowlands. It is bounded to the southwest by the Drakensberg Range and Southern African Bushveld and Drakensberg montane grassland, woodland, and forest ecoregions. To the west, it transitions to the drier Zambezian Baikiaea woodlands and Kalahari Acacia-Baikiaea woodlands on the Kalahari sands of the Southern African Plateau.

== Protected areas ==
Protected areas in the ecoregion include:

- Liwonde National Park, Malawi
- Banhine National Park, Mozambique
- Chipinge Safari Area, Zimbabwe
- Gonarezhou National Park, Zimbabwe
- Gorongosa National Park, Mozambique
- Kruger National Park, South Africa
- Limpopo National Park, Mozambique
- Lower Zambezi National Park, Zambia
- Mana Pools National Park, Zimbabwe
- Matusadona National Park, Zimbabwe
- Save Valley Conservancy, Zimbabwe
- Zinave National Park, Mozambique
- Moremi Game Reserve, Botswana
- Chobe National Park, Botswana

== See also ==
- Tropical and subtropical dry broadleaf forests – Biome
- Tropical and subtropical grasslands, savannas, and shrublands – Terrestrial habitat type defined by the World Wide Fund for Nature
