= Ancuabe District =

Coordinates: 12.986°S 39.858°E

- District
- District location in Mozambique
- Country: Mozambique
- Province: Cabo Delgado Province
- Capital: Ancuabe

Area
  - Total: 4,984 km^{2} (1,924 sq mi)

Population (2015)
  - Total: 121,320
  - Density: 24.34/km^{2} (63.05/sq mi)
- Time zone: UTC+3 (EAT)

Ancuabe District is a district of Cabo Delgado Province in northern Mozambique. It covers 4,984 km^{2} with 199,457 inhabitants in 2015. Its seat is the town of Ancuabe.

== Geography ==
It borders to the north with the district of Meluco, west with the district of Montepuez, south of the district of Chiúre and that the districts of Pemba-Metuge and Quissanga.

== Demographics ==
According to the 1997 census, the district had 87,243 inhabitants. Government data in early 2005 revealed a population of 109,792 n an area of 4 836 km^{2}, resulting in a population density of 21.9 persons per km^{2}. The same source points to a population of 121,000 inhabitants in 2015.

The district is inhabited mostly by the Makua people.

== History ==
In colonial period, Ancuabe was an administrative post in the municipality of Porto Amelia (now Pemba)

== Administrative divisions ==
The district is divided into three administrative sub districts (posts) (Ancuabe, Metoro and Meza, comprise the following locations:

- Administrative Post Ancuabe:
  - Ancuabe
  - Chiote
  - Nacuale
- Administrative Post Metoro:
  - Metoro
  - Salave
- Administrative Post Meza:
  - Campine
  - Meza
  - Minhuene
  - Nanju

=== Towns and villages ===
Adamo · Alenane · Alimo · Aliti · Alumar · Amade · Amade · Ametina · Aneli · Anli · Apura · Arufo · Assane · Assane · Assane · Atoto · Bacar · Bacar Antigo · Banjira · Biaque · Bidjolo · Borolia · Camope · Cantalia · Cantia · Cauo · Cavano · Chefe Afonso · Chefe Ahonamoro · Chefe Antonio · Chefe Aquimo · Chefe Cahura · Chefe Caire · Chefe Calialia · Chefe Cantato · Chefe Caroa · Chefe Chinande · Chefe Cobre · Chefe Colete · Chefe Coze · Chefe Cunliala · Chefe Giquina · Chefe Iacuelane · Chefe Ingori · Chefe Inhatia · Chefe Inripa · Chefe Inteia · Chefe Jalipa · Chefe Julai · Chefe Lave · Chefe Lile · Chefe Lopa · Chefe Madondo · Chefe Malepela · Chefe Marraca · Chefe Misere · Chefe Muanenele · Chefe Muansava · Chefe Muatuca · Chefe Muisse · Chefe Muituva · Chefe Nacibo · Chefe Naioto · Chefe Namione · Chefe Nampuara · Chefe Nancuto · Chefe Nanhoma · Chefe N Cumabai · Chefe Necule · Chefe Neparula · Chefe Nicuto · Chefe Nigoeleua · Chefe Nivero · Chefe Pilote · Chefe Puelia · Chefe Purremuere · Chefe Purulia · Chefe Quilevele · Chefe Quimao · Chefe Quitarubo · Chefe Raide · Chefe Sabao · Chefe Sararia · Chefe Sehane · Chefe Selemane · Chefe Sucuma · Chefe Taiar · Chefe Tico · Chitima · Chiure · Colue · Comala · Costa · Covaninha · Cuvave · Daxe · Dhalman · Giole · Givarro · Iamorra · Incole · Ingaua · Inraba · Insania · Iupuro · Jipala · João · Joio · Juma · Langima · Limia · Maaje · Macaia · Macaiamo · Macassar · Machepe · Macota · Magengo · Maite · Malapua · Manocha · Maon-o · Mapia · Marraparre · Mataiolava · Mauala · Mbonge · Mecete · Mecueracuera · Megama · Megege · Meia · Mejacara · Menhula · Mepamei · Mepengula · Mepipo · Mepoto · Mequitaculo · Merrapia · Mesa · Messalo · Messiloca · Metania · Metito · Metoma · Metoro · Metorro · Metuaquene · Meurra · Mexilo · Minhoene · Mocoloje · Mogido · Moguia · Moja · Moloco · Monunene · Moquina · Morruma · Mpingo · Mpita · Muada · Muaja · Muaja · Mualania · Muania · Muaria · Mue · Muepurra · Mueraerie · Muero · Muerria · Mugara · Muguia · Muguia · Muicava · Muigima · Muipace · Muiquite · Muita · Mussa · Nacacane · Nacololo · Nacopa · Nacote · Nacuale · Nacuale · Nacuanha · Nacuchupa · Nacussa · Nagimbue · Naia · Nalapia · Nalile · Namaaquitica · Namachatua · Namaica · Namangoma · Namarraco · Namarro · Namatubile · Namatuca · Namauco · Namuela · Namuela · Namecala · Nameta · Nampacala · Nampita · Namuine · Nancoi · Nancuto · Nanduli · Nangana · Nanjua · Nanlia · Nanoa · Nanripo · Nantoa · Nantucia · Nanzarro · Naoia · Naputa · Narenga · Narreva · Ncole · Ndala · Nero · Ngeue · Ngura · Niare · Nicocoro · Nicorombe · Nicuata · Niico · Nimone · Nina · Nipatacua · Niqueque · Niquita · Nita · Nivico · Nomapa · Nonia · Ntete · Nucuncile · Nuico · Nuto · Olocota · Omar · Regulo Mariri · Regulo Medoma · Regulo Mepima · Regulo Mogabo · Regulo Momola · Regulo Namaluma · Regulo Polubo · Regulo Polupo · Reia · Retima · Reva · Rimo · Roja · Rupe · Sabai · Saide · Sicoto · Simbo · Sirico · Sitaa · Sunate · Talibo · Talique · Taparara · Tarade · Tarato · Tecua · Terruma · Teucha · Titimare · Tonhinto · Tucule · Uadjire · Uapila · Uarrussa · Uatuncorra · Zambezia

== Economy ==
The district is well served in terms of accessibility, as it is cut by two major roads, Pemba-Montepuez and north-south road that connects Nampula to Mocímboa da Praia. The town of Ancuabe is located 67 kilometres from Pemba.

The dominant economic activity in the district is agriculture, involving almost the entire population. Most agricultural production is for self-support and the main crops are: cassava, maize, bean, sorghum, peanut and rice. Food supply is also aided with domestic animals and hunting of wildlife (deer and wild boar), and the fruit harvest.

Commercial farming of cotton, brown nuts and maize were important in colonial times and post-colonial but are returning, especially the cotton industry is of note. They are also exploited forest resources, especially as energy source for most of the population, although there is great potential forest.

There are also large reserves of graphite which were exploited commercially from 1994 to 2000. Graphites de Ancuabe Ltda. operated a sizeable mine and plant near Ancuabe from 1994 to 1999. According to feasibility studies for international mining companies, the reserves amount to about 1 million tonnes of ore with a content of 10% graphite. The extraction capacity installed (open) has a potential production capacity of 10,000 tons of graphite a year. The extraction and processing were stalled in 1999, however, due to a number of reasons, particularly financial difficulties of the dealer, the low price of the mineral on the international market and a poor and expensive power supply, because the district is not yet connected to the national grid. In 2007, the Mozambique government announced its intention to re-open the mine, but this depends on the supply of electricity from the Cahora Bassa Dam.
