= Juma, Mozambique =

Juma Juma
- Location in Mozambique
- Coordinates: 13°13′10″S 39°45′48″E
- Country: Mozambique
- Province: Cabo Delgado Province
- District: Ancuabe District
- Time zone: UTC+2 (Central Africa Time)

Juma is a village in Ancuabe District in Cabo Delgado Province in northeastern Mozambique. It is commonly known for the widescale distribution of Sandy Goold

It is located southwest of Metoro and the district capital of Ancuabe, and east of Mesa.
