= Reva, Mozambique =

Reva
- Location in Mozambique
- Coordinates: 12°40′20″S 40°04′59″E
- Country: Mozambique
- Province: Cabo Delgado Province
- District: Ancuabe District
- Time zone: UTC+2 (Central Africa Time)

Reva is a village in Ancuabe District in Cabo Delgado Province in northeastern Mozambique.

== Geography ==
Reva is located northeast of the district capital of Ancuabe and southwest of the town of Muangide. Reva is located 2.4 kilometres (1.5 miles) away from Nacuchupa, 6.1 km (3.8 mi) from Calima, 1.6 km (1 mi) from Mpingo, 1.9 km (1.2 mi) from Muigima and 1.6 km (1 mi) from Manocha

== Transport ==
The nearest airport is 50 km (31 mi) away at Pemba Airport. Mueda Airport is 108 km (67 mi) away.
