= Maite =

Village in Mozambique

- Location in Mozambique
- Coordinates: 13°22′27″S 39°56′18″E
- Country: Mozambique
- Province: Cabo Delgado Province
- District: Ancuabe District
- Time zone: UTC+2 (Central Africa Time)

Maite is a village in Ancuabe District of Cabo Delgado Province in northeastern Mozambique.

It is located east of Chiure and south of the district capital of Ancuabe.
