= Machepe =

Village in Cabo Delgado Province, Mozambique

- Location in Mozambique
- Coordinates: 12°2′0″S 39°32′0″E
- Country: Mozambique
- Province: Cabo Delgado Province
- District: Ancuabe District
- Time zone: UTC+2 (Central Africa Time)

Machepe is a village in Ancuabe District of Cabo Delgado Province in northeastern Mozambique.

The village lies to the north of the town of Mesa and to the southwest of Ancuabe, the district's capital.
