= Muigima =

- Location in Mozambique
- Coordinates: 12°41′06″S 40°05′54″E
- Country: Mozambique
- Province: Cabo Delgado Province
- District: Ancuabe District
- Time zone: UTC+2 (Central Africa Time)

Muigima is a village in Ancuabe District in Cabo Delgado Province in northeastern Mozambique.

It is located southwest of the district capital of Ancuabe. Manocha is located 1.2 miles (1.9 km) from Reva, 0.8 miles (1.3 km) from Manocha, 1.5 miles (2.4 km) from Mpingo, 2.8 miles (4.5 km) from Niico and 0.9 miles (1.4 km) from Namangoma.

== Transport ==
The nearest airport is 30 miles (48 km) away at Pemba Airport.
