= Maaje =

- Location in Mozambique
- Coordinates: 13°10′44″S 39°21′28″E
- Country: Mozambique
- Province: Cabo Delgado Province
- District: Ancuabe District
- Time zone: UTC+2 (Central Africa Time)

Maaje is a village in Ancuabe District in Cabo Delgado Province in northeastern Mozambique.

It is located south-west of the district capital of Ancuabe and Mesa.
