= Balama Solar Power Station =

Solar farm in Mozambique

- Country: Mozambique
- Location: Balama, Balama District, Cabo Delgado Province
- Coordinates: 13°18′22″S 38°40′01″E
- Status: Under construction
- Construction began: 2022
- Commission date: 2023 Expected
- Owner: CrossBoundary Energy
- Operator: Solarcentury Africa Limited

Solar farm
- Type: Flat-panel PV

Power generation
- Nameplate capacity: 11.25 megawatts (15,090 hp)

The Balama Solar Power Station, is a 11.25 megawatts (15,090 hp) solar power plant under construction in Mozambique. The project is owned and under development by Solarcentury an independent power producer (IPP), based in the United Kingdom. The solar farm will be connected to an 8.5 MW/8.5MWh battery storage system. The two energy sources will then be synchronized with the existing 15.4 MW diesel-fired thermal power source, to form a 35.15 MW hybrid power station. The energy generated here is used in the Balama Graphite Mine, owned and operated by Syrah Resources, a Canadian minerals and technology company.

== Location ==
The power station sits on the campus of Syrah Resources, in the town of Balama, in Balama District in Cabo Delgado Province, in northern Mozambique. Balama is located approximately 262 kilometres (163 mi) by road, west of the city of Pemba, Mozambique, the capital of Cabo Delgado Province.

== Overview ==
The Balama Graphite Mine is owned and operated by Syrah Resources, a Canadian minerals and technology company, with roots in Melbourne, Australia. Prior to 2023, the mine used electricity solely sourced from a 15.4 MW diesel-powered thermal power plant. The new solar farm (11.25 MW) and the attached 8.5 MW/8.5 MWh battery storage system will be integrated into the existing thermal power station to form a hybrid (thermal/solar/battery storage) power plant. It is expected that the new hybrid power source will cut down diesel consumption at the mine by 35 percent.

== Financing ==
In April 2022, Solarcentury Africa Limited concluded financing and ownership arrangements with CrossBoundary Energy and Syrah Resources. Under those arrangements, Solar Century Africa is expected to form an ad hoc company to design, construct, operate and maintain the power station under "a hybrid power control system."

CrossBoundary Energy will retain ownership of the new solar and battery facilities. Solarcentury will maintain an "operating lease" and an "operating and maintenance contract". The new facilities will be maintained under a build–own–operate–transfer (BOOT) arrangement. After 10 years from commercial commissioning, ownership will transfer from CrossBoundary Energy to Syrah Resources. Syrah Resources will consume all the energy generated by the solar farm and battery storage system.

== Timeline ==
Construction is expected to begin in 2022, with commercial commissioning anticipated in 2023.

== See also ==
- List of power stations in Mozambique
- Erongo Battery Energy Storage System
