= Limia, Mozambique =

Limia
- Location in Mozambique
- Coordinates: 13°15′33″S 39°32′2″E
- Country: Mozambique
- Province: Cabo Delgado Province
- District: Ancuabe District
- Time zone: UTC+2 (Central Africa Time)

Limia is a village in Ancuabe District in Cabo Delgado Province in northeastern Mozambique.

It is located south-west of the district capital of Ancuabe and south of Mesa.
