= Nina, Mozambique =

Nina
- Location in Mozambique
- Coordinates: 13°14′22″S 39°51′42″E
- Country: Mozambique
- Province: Cabo Delgado Province
- District: Ancuabe District
- Time zone: UTC+2 (Central Africa Time)

Nina is a village in Ancuabe District in Cabo Delgado Province in northeastern Mozambique. It is directly south of Metoro.
