= Macaiamo =

- Location in Mozambique
- Coordinates: 13°5′47″S 39°27′30″E
- Country: Mozambique
- Province: Cabo Delgado Province
- District: Ancuabe District
- Time zone: UTC+2 (Central Africa Time)

Macaiamo is a village in Ancuabe District in Cabo Delgado Province in northeastern Mozambique.

It is located west of the town of Mesa, Mozambique.
