= Ngura =

- Location in Mozambique
- Coordinates: 12°54′34″S 39°18′10″E
- Country: Mozambique
- Province: Cabo Delgado Province
- District: Ancuabe District
- Time zone: UTC+2 (Central Africa Time)

Ngura is a village in Ancuabe District, Cabo Delgado Province, in northeastern Mozambique. It is located north of the district capital of Ancuabe.
