= Malapua =

- Location in Mozambique
- Coordinates: 12°58′18″S 39°49′18″E
- Country: Mozambique
- Province: Cabo Delgado Province
- District: Ancuabe District
- Time zone: UTC+2 (Central Africa Time)

Malapua is a village in Ancuabe District in Cabo Delgado Province in northeastern Mozambique.

It is located several miles north-west of the district capital of Ancuabe.
