= Joio =

- Location in Mozambique
- Coordinates: 13°16′18″S 40°13′23″E
- Country: Mozambique
- Province: Cabo Delgado Province
- District: Ancuabe District
- Time zone: UTC+2 (Central Africa Time)

Joio is a village in Ancuabe District in Cabo Delgado Province in northeastern Mozambique.

It is located southeast of the district capital of Ancuabe and west of Mecufi on the coast.
