= Mpingo, Mozambique =

Mpingo
- Location in Mozambique
- Coordinates: 12°39′38″S 40°5′45″E
- Country: Mozambique
- Province: Cabo Delgado Province
- District: Ancuabe District
- Time zone: UTC+2 (Central Africa Time)

Mpingo is a village in Ancuabe District in Cabo Delgado Province in northeastern Mozambique.

== Geography ==
It is located northeast of the district capital of Ancuabe. Mpingo is located 1.6 kilometres (1 mile) from Reva, 5.5 km (3.4 mi) from Calima, 2.3 km (1.4 mi) from Niico and 2.4 km (1.5 mi) from Muigima

== Transport ==
The nearest airport is 50 km (31 mi) away at Pemba Airport.
