= Chefe Cantato =

- Location in Mozambique
- Coordinates: 13°19′46″S 39°52′14″E
- Country: Mozambique
- Province: Cabo Delgado Province
- District: Ancuabe District
- Time zone: UTC+2 (Central Africa Time)

Chefe Cantato is a village in Ancuabe District in Cabo Delgado Province in northeastern Mozambique.

It is located southeast of Mesa.
