= Magengo =

- Location in Mozambique
- Coordinates: 13°0′12″S 39°55′6″E
- Country: Mozambique
- Province: Cabo Delgado Province
- District: Ancuabe District
- Time zone: UTC+2 (Central Africa Time)

Magengo is a village in Ancuabe District in Cabo Delgado Province in northeastern Mozambique.

It is located east of the district capital of Ancuabe.
