= Uapila =

- Location in Mozambique
- Coordinates: 12°55′30″S 39°52′0″E
- Country: Mozambique
- Province: Cabo Delgado Province
- District: Ancuabe District
- Time zone: UTC+2 (Central Africa Time)

Uapila is a village in Ancuabe District in Cabo Delgado Province in northeastern Mozambique.

It is located north of the district capital of Ancuabe.
