= Cavano =

- Location in Mozambique
- Coordinates: 13°16′33″S 40°14′7″E
- Country: Mozambique
- Province: Cabo Delgado Province
- District: Ancuabe District
- Time zone: UTC+2 (Central Africa Time)

Cavano is a village in Ancuabe District in Cabo Delgado Province in northeastern Mozambique. The Megaruma River flows nearby.
