= Niare =

- Location in Mozambique
- Coordinates: 13°2′9″S 39°46′39″E
- Country: Mozambique
- Province: Cabo Delgado Province
- District: Ancuabe District
- Time zone: UTC+2 (Central Africa Time)

Niare is a village in Ancuabe District in Cabo Delgado Province in northeastern Mozambique.

It is located south-west of the district capital of Ancuabe along the highway.
