= Nanripo =

- Location in Mozambique
- Coordinates: 13°3′0″S 39°45′5″E
- Country: Mozambique
- Province: Cabo Delgado Province
- District: Ancuabe District
- Time zone: UTC+2 (Central Africa Time)

Nanripo is a village in Ancuabe District in Cabo Delgado Province in northeastern Mozambique.

It lies on the highway southwest of Ancuabe.
