= Langima =

- Location in Mozambique
- Coordinates: 12°55′39″S 39°53′26″E
- Country: Mozambique
- Province: Cabo Delgado Province
- District: Ancuabe District
- Time zone: UTC+2 (Central Africa Time)

Langima is a village in Ancuabe District in Cabo Delgado Province in northeastern Mozambique.

It is located northeast of the district capital of Ancuabe.
