= Manocha =

- Location in Mozambique
- Coordinates: 12°41′22″S 40°05′06″E
- Country: Mozambique
- Province: Cabo Delgado Province
- District: Ancuabe District
- Time zone: UTC+2 (Central Africa Time)

Manocha is a village in Ancuabe District in Cabo Delgado Province in northeastern Mozambique.

== Geography ==
It is located northeast of the district capital of Ancuabe. Manocha is located 2.4 miles (3.9 km) from Meurra, 0.8 miles (1.3 km) from Nomapa, 1 mile (1.6 km) from Reva, 0.8 miles (1.3 km) from Muigima and 1.2 miles (1.9 km) from Namangoma

== Transport ==
The nearest airport is 31 miles (50 km) away at Pemba Airport.
