= Mueda District =

Coordinates: 11°38′S 39°37′E

Mueda District Wilaya ya Mueda (Swahili)
- District
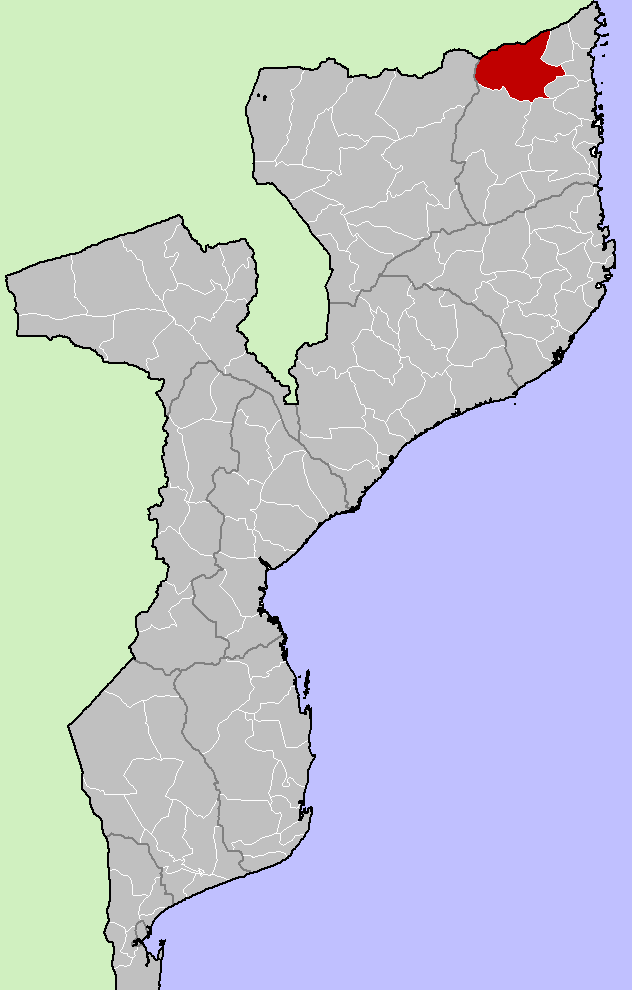
- District location in Mozambique
- Country: Mozambique
- Province: Cabo Delgado Province
- Capital: Mueda

Area
  - Total: 11,343 km^{2} (4,380 sq mi)

Population (2015)
  - Total: 128,510
  - Density: 11.329/km^{2} (29.343/sq mi)
- Time zone: UTC+3 (EAT)

Mueda is a district of the province of Cabo Delgado, in Moçambique. The capital is the town of Mueda.

The district of Mueda is bordered by Mtwara Region to the north by the Tanzania atarvés of the river Rovuma, to the west by the district of Mecula in the province of Niassa, to the south by the districts of Montepuez and Meluco, and to the east by the districts of Muidumbe, Mocimboa da Praia and Nangade.

According to the Census of 2007, the district has 113,742 inhabitants and an area of 14,150 km^{2}.

In 2022, a study was carried out in six districts in Cabo Delgado into disease preparedness in the face of climate disasters. Mueda was one of two districts accessed as having low preparedness.

Mueda is also a temporary home to numerous refugees fleeing conflict, as the Lyanda camp.
