= Macassar, Mozambique =

Macassar
- Location in Mozambique
- Coordinates: 12°51′41″S 39°59′40″E
- Country: Mozambique
- Province: Cabo Delgado Province
- District: Ancuabe District
- Time zone: UTC+2 (Central Africa Time)

Macassar is a town in Ancuabe District in Cabo Delgado Province in northeastern Mozambique.

It is located northeast of the district capital of Ancuabe.
