= Ntete =

- Location in Mozambique
- Coordinates: 12°59′13″S 39°50′15″E
- Country: Mozambique
- Province: Cabo Delgado Province
- District: Ancuabe District
- Time zone: UTC+2 (Central Africa Time)

Ntete is a village in Ancuabe District in Cabo Delgado Province in northeastern Mozambique.

It is located 1.2 miles (1.9 km) away from the district capital of Ancuabe on the southwestern outskirts of the town.

== Transport ==
The nearest airport is 40 miles (64 km) away at Pemba Airport.
