= Ngeue =

- Location in Mozambique
- Coordinates: 12°59′52″S 39°56′36″E
- Country: Mozambique
- Province: Cabo Delgado Province
- District: Ancuabe District
- Time zone: UTC+2 (Central Africa Time)

Ngeue is a village in Ancuabe District in Cabo Delgado Province in northeastern Mozambique.

It is located south-east of the district capital of Ancuabe.
