= Mecúfi District =

Coordinates: 13.307°S 40.551°E

- District
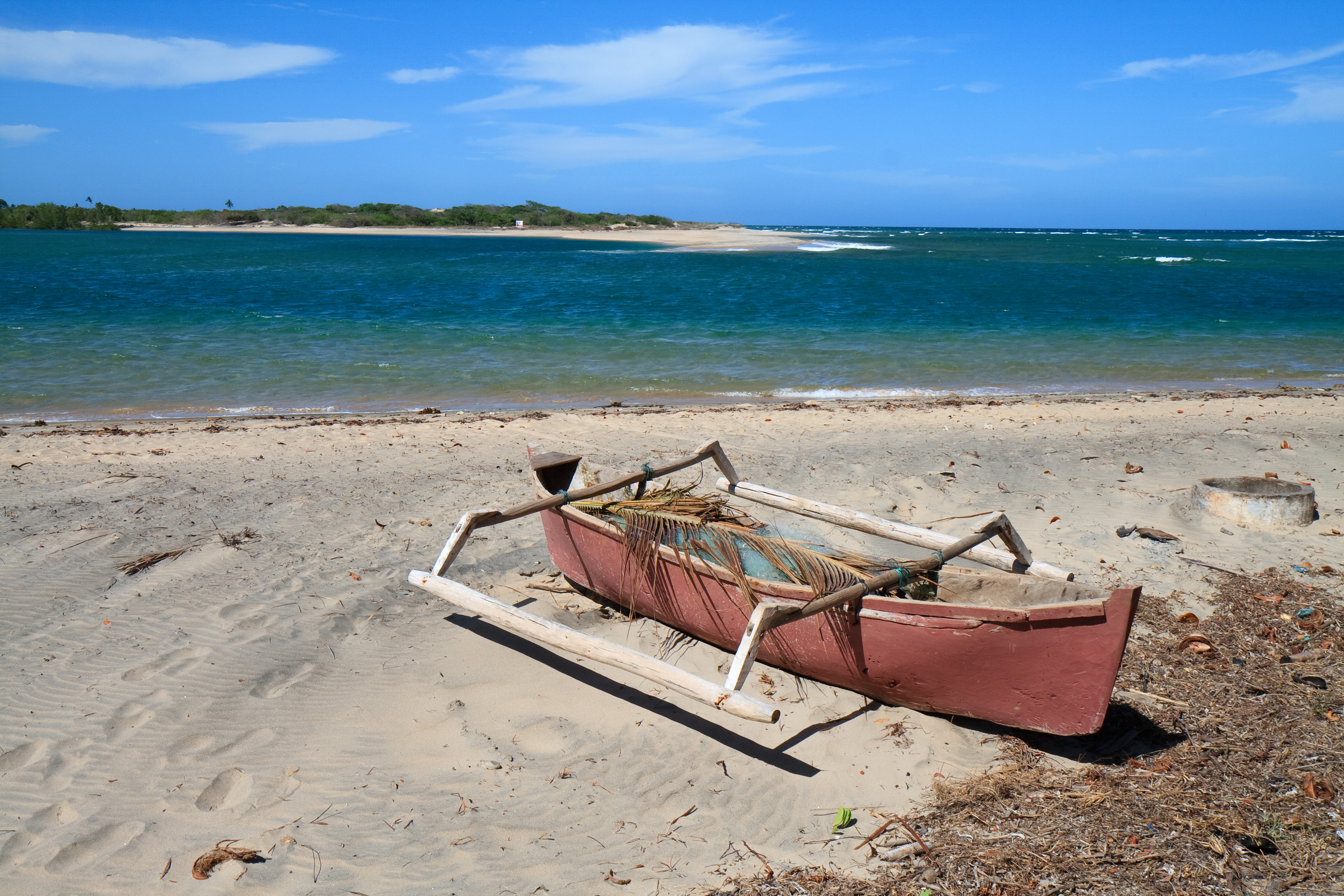

- District location in Mozambique
- Country: Mozambique
- Province: Cabo Delgado Province
- Capital: Mecúfi

Area
  - Total: 1,192 km^{2} (460 sq mi)

Population (2017)
  - Total: 61,531
  - Density: 51.62/km^{2} (133.7/sq mi)
- Time zone: UTC+3 (EAT)

Mecúfi District is a district of Cabo Delgado Province in northern Mozambique. It is bordered in the north by the district capital of Pemba and the Metuge District, to the west by the Ancuabe District, to the south by the Chiúre District, and to the east by the Indian Ocean. It spans 1,192 km^{2} with 61,531 inhabitants. The dominant economic activity of the district lies in agriculture, however tourism is also an important activity due to the beaches in the area.

== History ==
The first documented settlement in the territory that is now the Mecúfi District belonged to the town of Lúrio, which was created in 1904 by the Niassa Company. During World War I, the region was under attach by German patrols in January 1918 nearing the capital of the province in Pemba, then called Porto Amélia. In 1931, the town became directly controlled by the Portuguese government. The Mecúfi District has bene relatively safe from the Insurgency in Cabo Delgado that broke out in nearby areas in 2017 and became home to refugees from surrounding areas. However, the district was attacked on June 14, 2022 with one fatality in the village of Mancuaia.

== Demographics ==
According to the results of the 2017 census, the district had 61,531 inhabitants in an area of 1,192 km^{2} at a population density of 51.6 inhabitants per km^{2}. The district is primarily inhabited by the Makua people.

== Administrative divisions ==
The district is divided into two administrative decisions with several villages in each.

- Mecúfi-Sede
  - Muaria
  - Natuco
  - Sambene
- Murrébué
  - Maueia
  - Muitua
