= Chefe Chinande =

- Village
- Location in Mozambique
- Coordinates: 13°0′38″S 39°31′56″E
- Country: Mozambique
- Province: Cabo Delgado Province
- District: Ancuabe District
- Time zone: UTC+2 (CAT)

Chefe Chinande is a village in Ancuabe District in Cabo Delgado Province in northeastern Mozambique.
