= Aliti =

- Location in Mozambique
- Coordinates: 13°11′0″S 40°5′0″E
- Country: Mozambique
- Province: Cabo Delgado Province
- District: Ancuabe District
- Time zone: UTC+2 (Central Africa Time)

Aliti is a village in Ancuabe District in Cabo Delgado Province in northeastern Mozambique.

Nearby towns and villages include Chefe Purulia (4.8 kilometres (3.0 mi)), Chefe Muatuca (5.0 kilometres (3.1 mi)), Namatuca (5.6 kilometres (3.5 mi)), Moja (10.3 kilometres (6.4 mi)), Nancuto (10.5 kilometres (6.5 mi)) and Palovi (10.3 kilometres (6.4 mi)).
