= Nero, Mozambique =

Nero
- Location in Mozambique
- Coordinates: 12°56′12″S 39°51′14″E
- Country: Mozambique
- Province: Cabo Delgado Province
- District: Ancuabe District
- Time zone: UTC+2 (Central Africa Time)

Nero is a village in Ancuabe District in Cabo Delgado Province in northeastern Mozambique.
