= Balama (disambiguation) =

Balama may refer to:

- Balama District, a district of Cabo Delgado Province in northern Mozambique
- Balama, a town in Balama District of Cabo Delgado Province in northern Mozambique
- Balama mine, one of the largest graphite mines in Mozambique and in the world located in the northern part of the country in Cabo Delgado Province
