= Chefe Tico =

- Location in Mozambique
- Coordinates: 13°19′16″S 40°0′38″E
- Country: Mozambique
- Province: Cabo Delgado Province
- District: Ancuabe District
- Time zone: UTC+2 (Central Africa Time)

Chefe Tico is a village in Ancuabe District in Cabo Delgado Province in northeastern Mozambique.
