= Chefe Cobre =

- Village
- Location in Mozambique
- Coordinates: 13°17′52″S 40°3′57″E
- Country: Mozambique
- Province: Cabo Delgado Province
- District: Ancuabe District
- Time zone: UTC+2 (CAT)

Chefe Cobre is a village in Ancuabe District in Cabo Delgado Province in northeastern Mozambique.
