= Chiure =

- Location in Mozambique
- Coordinates: 13°22′57″S 39°46′54″E
- Country: Mozambique
- Province: Cabo Delgado Province
- District: Ancuabe District
- Time zone: UTC+2 (Central Africa Time)

Chiure or Chiure Novo is a town in Chiure District in Cabo Delgado Province in northeastern Mozambique.

It is the capital of Chiure District. The District has the highest population of all Districts in Cabo Delgado province. Construction of a district hospital was completed in 2009.

The local population is predominantly Makua. Portuguese is widely spoken in the district Capital as it is the official language of Mozambique, but in outlying towns and villages Emakua may be the only spoken language.
