= Bacar, Mozambique =

Bacar
- Location in Mozambique
- Coordinates: 12°55′17″S 39°51′6″E
- Country: Mozambique
- Province: Cabo Delgado Province
- District: Ancuabe District
- Time zone: UTC+2 (Central Africa Time)

Bacar is a village in Ancuabe District in Cabo Delgado Province in northeastern Mozambique.
