= Nanoa, Mozambique =

Nanoa
- Location in Mozambique
- Coordinates: 13°6′6″S 39°58′51″E
- Country: Mozambique
- Province: Cabo Delgado Province
- District: Ancuabe District
- Time zone: UTC+2 (Central Africa Time)

Nanoa is a village in Ancuabe District in Cabo Delgado Province in northeastern Mozambique.
