= Adamo, Mozambique =

Adamo
- Location in Mozambique
- Coordinates: 13°1′6″S 39°40′0″E
- Country: Mozambique
- Province: Cabo Delgado Province
- District: Ancuabe District
- Time zone: UTC+2 (Central Africa Time)

Adamo is a village in Ancuabe District, Cabo Delgado Province, in northeastern Mozambique.
