= Naputa =

- Location in Mozambique
- Coordinates: 12°57′10″S 39°44′19″E
- Country: Mozambique
- Province: Cabo Delgado Province
- District: Ancuabe District
- Time zone: UTC+2 (Central Africa Time)

Naputa is a village in Ancuabe District in Cabo Delgado Province in northeastern Mozambique.
