= Anli =

- Location in Mozambique
- Coordinates: 12°51′6″S 39°57′49″E
- Country: Mozambique
- Province: Cabo Delgado Province
- District: Ancuabe District
- Time zone: UTC+2 (Central Africa Time)
- Climate: Aw

Anli is a village in Ancuabe District in Cabo Delgado Province in northeastern Mozambique.
