= Biaque =

- Location in Mozambique
- Coordinates: 12°51′46″S 39°56′56″E
- Country: Mozambique
- Province: Cabo Delgado Province
- District: Ancuabe District
- Time zone: UTC+2 (Central Africa Time)

Biaque is a village in Ancuabe District in Cabo Delgado Province in northeastern Mozambique.
