= Chefe Afonso =

- Location in Mozambique
- Coordinates: 13°10′2″S 39°43′48″E
- Country: Mozambique
- Province: Cabo Delgado Province
- District: Ancuabe District
- Time zone: UTC+2 (Central Africa Time)

Chefe Afonso is a village in Ancuabe District in Cabo Delgado Province in northeastern Mozambique.
