= Cantia =

- Location in Mozambique
- Coordinates: 13°22′38″S 39°50′23″E
- Country: Mozambique
- Province: Cabo Delgado Province
- District: Ancuabe District
- Time zone: UTC+2 (Central Africa Time)

Cantia is a village in Ancuabe District in Cabo Delgado Province in northeastern Mozambique.
