= Narreva =

- Location in Mozambique
- Coordinates: 13°1′18″S 39°54′19″E
- Country: Mozambique
- Province: Cabo Delgado Province
- District: Ancuabe District
- Time zone: UTC+2 (Central Africa Time)

Narreva is a village in Ancuabe District in Cabo Delgado Province in northeastern Mozambique.

It is located several miles south-east of the district capital of Ancuebe.
