= Zambezia, Cabo Delgado =

Zambezia
- Location in Mozambique
- Coordinates: 12°54′13″S 39°42′25″E
- Country: Mozambique
- Province: Cabo Delgado Province
- District: Ancuabe District
- Time zone: UTC+2 (Central Africa Time)

Zambezia [zɐ̃ˈbezjɐ] is a village in Ancuabe District in Cabo Delgado Province in northeastern Mozambique.

It is located northwest of the district capital of Ancuabe.
