= Metoro =

- Location in Mozambique
- Coordinates: 13°6′16″S 39°52′31″E
- Country: Mozambique
- Province: Cabo Delgado Province
- District: Ancuabe District
- Time zone: UTC+2 (Central Africa Time)

Metoro is a town in Ancuabe District in Cabo Delgado Province in northeastern Mozambique.

It is located southwest of the district capital of Ancuabe.
