= CrossBoundary Energy =

Kenyan multinational energy investment company

CrossBoundary Energy Limited
- Company type: Private
- Industry: Investment in energy systems for commercial and industrial use in Africa
- Headquarters: Waiyaki Way, Westlands, Nairobi, Kenya
- Products: Electricity
- Number of employees: 50 (2022)
- Website: www.crossboundary.com/energy

CrossBoundary Energy Limited is an investment company that invests in renewable energy (solar, wind and battery storage) projects in Africa. It focuses on the supply of electricity to commercial and industrial consumers. The firm is a subsidiary of the CrossBoundary Group.

== Location ==
The headquarters of CrossBoundary Energy are located along Waiyaki Way, in the central business district of Nairobi, the capital and largest city of Kenya.

== Overview ==
As of July 2022, CrossBoundary Energy owns and operates renewable energy power stations which supply electricity to businesses and industries in over a dozen countries in Africa. At that time the company's portfolio was in excess of US$188 million, with a diverse client list, including AB InBev, Diageo, Heineken and Unilever, among others.

== Ownership ==
As of July 2022, the shareholding in the stock of CrossBoundary Energy was as illustrated in the table below.

Shareholding In CrossBoundary Energy Limited
Rank	Shareholder	Domicile	Percentage	Notes
1	KLP Norfund Investments	Norway		
2	Norfund	Norway		
3	ARCH Emerging Markets Partners Limited	United Kingdom		

== Projects ==
One of the projects that CrossBoundary Energy has invested in is the Balama Solar Power Station, in Balama District in Cabo Delgado Province, in northern Mozambique. The power station, with the attached battery storage extension supplies the Balama Graphite Mine, owned and operated by Syrah Resources.

== Recent events ==
In June 2022, CrossBoundary Energy raised US$25 million in equity and debt financing from ARCH Emerging Markets Partners Limited (equity), Bank of America (debt) and Microsoft Climate Innovation Fund (debt). These funds were specifically intended to invest in new solar mini-grids in Africa. In July 2022, Norfund and KLP Norfund Investors jointly invested another US$40 million in CrossBoundary Energy, to increase the company's portfolio of renewable energy generation projects.

== See also ==
- Economy of Kenya
- Energy in Africa
