= Nangana, Mozambique =

Nangana
- Location in Mozambique
- Coordinates: 12°52′S 39°34′E
- Country: Mozambique
- Province: Cabo Delgado Province
- District: Ancuabe District
- Time zone: UTC+2 (Central Africa Time)

Nangana is a village in Ancuabe District in Cabo Delgado Province in northeastern Mozambique. The primary language spoken is Portuguese.
