= Banjira =

- Location in Mozambique
- Coordinates: 12°56′48″S 39°50′17″E
- Country: Mozambique
- Province: Cabo Delgado Province
- District: Ancuabe District
- Time zone: UTC+2 (Central Africa Time)

Banjira is a village in Ancuabe District in Cabo Delgado Province in northeastern Mozambique.
