= Alumar =

- Location in Mozambique
- Coordinates: 12°55′23″S 39°45′15″E
- Country: Mozambique
- Province: Cabo Delgado Province
- District: Ancuabe District
- Time zone: UTC+2 (Central Africa Time)

Alumar is a village in Ancuabe District in Cabo Delgado Province in northeastern Mozambique.
