= Ndala =

- Location in Mozambique
- Coordinates: 12°51′6″S 39°30′21″E
- Country: Mozambique
- Province: Cabo Delgado Province
- District: Ancuabe District
- Time zone: UTC+2 (Central Africa Time)

Ndala is a village in Ancuabe District in Cabo Delgado in northeastern Mozambique.

Ndala is a common name in central and southern parts of Africa. Ndala has two main meanings:

1. Ndala is an honorific title given to a royal family or a royal generation ( specially in some tribes of Republic Democratic of Congo). It can also be translated as Prince or Princess.

2. Ndala also means palm branches. In Africa, the palm branch represents a symbol of triumph and victory, also a symbol of joy and celebration. The palm branch is also often used on a house of a bereaved family as a sign of comfort and a reminder that there is hope in resurrection. Ndala is basically a name to inspire joy and consolation.
