= Palma District =

Coordinates: 10°47′S 40°29′E

Palma District Wilaya ya Palma (Swahili)
- District
- District location in Mozambique
- Country: Mozambique
- Province: Cabo Delgado Province
- Capital: Palma

Area
  - Total: 3,576 km^{2} (1,381 sq mi)

Population (2015)
  - Total: 52,269
  - Density: 14.62/km^{2} (37.86/sq mi)
- Time zone: UTC+2 (EAT)

Palma District is a district of Cabo Delgado Province in northern Mozambique. It covers 3,576 km^{2} with 52,269 inhabitants (2015). Its principal town is Palma. The district borders Mtwara Region, Tanzania to the north.
