= Muidumbe District =

Coordinates: 11.777°S 39.897°E

- District
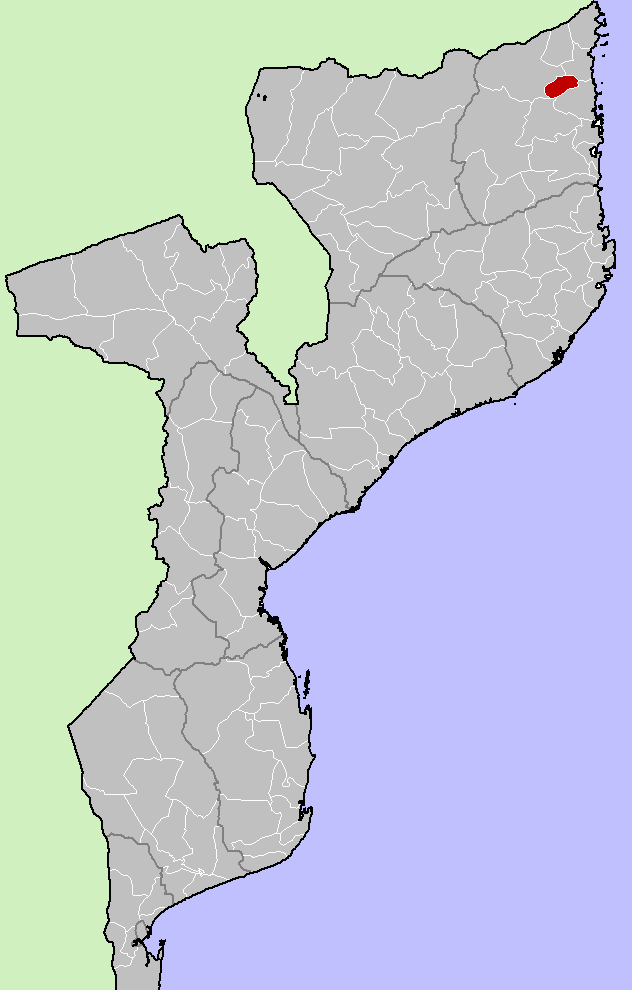
- District location in Mozambique
- Country: Mozambique
- Province: Cabo Delgado Province
- Capital: Muidumbe

Area
  - Total: 2,123 km^{2} (820 sq mi)

Population (2015)
  - Total: 78,721
  - Density: 37.08/km^{2} (96.04/sq mi)
- Time zone: UTC+3 (EAT)

Muidumbe is a district of Cabo Delgado Province in Mozambique. Its capital is the village of Muidumbe.

The district of Muidumbe is limited to the north and the east by Mocimboa da Praia District, to the north and the west by Mueda District, and to the south by Macomia District.

According to the Census of 2007, the district has 72,840 inhabitants and an area of 2,213 km^{2}.
