= Sirica (disambiguation) =

Sirica was the surname of American federal judge John Sirica (1904-1992).

Sirica also may refer to:

- Alphonse Sirica, American cancer and bile-duct research scientist
- Sirica (Kirby), a fictional character, daughter of Garlude, appearing in episode 60 of the Japanese animated television series Kirby: Right Back at Ya!

== See also ==
- Similar surnames of Italian origin:
  - Sirico
  - Serpico
