= Mpingo =

Mpingo may refer to:

- Dalbergia melanoxylon, also known as African blackwood, a flowering plant in the family Fabaceae
- Mpingo, Mozambique, a village in Ancuabe District in Cabo Delgado Province in northeastern Mozambique
- BD+00 316, a F-type main sequence star
