= Ndala (disambiguation) =

Ndala is a Mozambican village.

Ndala may also refer to:

== People ==
=== Given name ===
- Ndala Ibrahim (born 1985), Nigerian footballer
- Ndala Kasheba (died 2004), Congolese guitarist
- Ndala Monga (born 1986), Congolese football goalkeeper

=== Surname ===
- Addo Ndala (born 1973), Congolese hurdler
- Blaise Ndala, Canadian author
- Mamadou Ndala (1978–2014), Congolese colonel
