= Manocha (disambiguation) =

Manocha is a village in Mozambique.

Manocha may also refer to:

- Dinesh Manocha, American computer scientist
- Ajit Manocha, president and CEO of SEMI
- Inder Manocha (born 1968), British Asian stand-up comedian and actor
