= Zambezia =

Zambezia may refer to:

== Places ==
- Zambezia Province, Mozambique
- Zambezia, Cabo Delgado, Mozambique, a village in Cabo Delgado Province
- Zambezia or Zambesia, an early name for Rhodesia (now Zambia and Zimbabwe)

== Other uses ==
- Zambezia (film), a 2012 South African animated film
- Zambezia (journal): The Journal of Humanities of the University of Zimbabwe

== See also ==
- Zambesia, a self-proclaimed state in Southern Africa
