= Timeline of São Luís, Maranhão =

The following is a timeline of the history of the city of São Luís, in the state of Maranhão, Brazil.

== Before the 16th century ==
- Present-day São Luís was a large village of the Tupinambá people

== 16th century ==
- 1535. Division of Brazil by the Portuguese into hereditary captaincies.
- 1536. Donatory-Captain of Maranhão João de Barros granted colonization of Maranhão region.
- 1550s. Nazaré founded by João de Barros, in the general vicinity of present-day São Luís.
- 1550s. Nazaré abandoned by the Portuguese due to indigenous resistance and difficulty in access to the site.

== 17th century ==
- 1611. French friars of the Order of Friars Minor Capuchin describe site of the promontory of São Luís.
- 1612.
  - August 12. Settlement of Saint-Louis as part of Equinoctial France and celebration of inaugural mass.
  - September 8. Declaration of foundation of Saint-Louis by Daniel de La Touche and end of the construction of the Fort of Saint Louis.
- 1614. Fort of Saint Louis augmented to guard against invasion of the new colony; governor's residence built as part of expansion of fort.
- 1614. Governor General of Brazil orders military expedition under Jerônimo de Albuquerque from Pernambuco to French Saint-Louis.
- 1615.
  - November 4. Portugal, as part of the Iberian Union, retake Maranhão in the Battle of Guaxenduba, and expel the French.
  - City retains the name São Luís for the urban center; the fort is renamed Fort of São Felipe in honor of Philip IV.
  - City plan on grid system laid out by the Chief Engineer of Brazil, Francisco Frias de Mesquita.
- 1621.
  - State of Maranhão established with São Luís as capital, independent from the State of Brazil and subordinate to Lisbon.
  - Church of Our Lady of Victory (Igreja da Nossa Senhora da Vitória), first parish church of São Luís.
- 1619. São Luís, elevated to the category of town (vila), with establishment of Municipal Council.
  - Brothers of the Carmelite Order enters São Luís.
- 1623
  - September 23. Francisco Coelho de Carvalho appointed the first Governor and Captain General of the State of Maranhão and Grão-Pará.
- 1624. Governor Coelho de Carvalho orders the renovation of Fort São Felipe and reconstruction of first Governors' residence on site.
- 1641. Dutch occupation of São Luís by Admiral Jan Cornelizoon Lichtardt and Colonel Koin Anderson, as wider Dutch invasions of Brazil.
- 1642. São Luís has a population of 700-800 and 500 to 600 houses.
- 1644. Portuguese reoccupation of São Luís by Antonio Muniz Barreiros and Teixeira de Melo, the plantation owners of the Mearim River region.
- 1654. State of Maranhão and Grão-Pará established.
- 1661. Jesuit Father Antônio Vieira deported to Portugal over dispute on the treatment of indigenous peoples in Maranhão.
- 1665. Caminho Grande, a road connecting the urban center to the villages and towns in the interior, consolidated.
- 1670. São Luís elevated to the category of city (cidade).
- 1642. São Luís has a population of approximately 1,000.
- 1684. Beckman's Revolt occurs based on local discontent against the Maranhão Trading Company.

== 18th century ==
- 1717. Brotherhood of Our Lady of the Rosary of Black People granted land and immediately begins construction on the Church of Our Lady of the Rosary.
- 1718. Population of Saõ Luís: 854.
- 1751.
  - July 31. The State of Maranhão renamed State of Maranhão and Grão-Pará by order of Sebastião José de Carvalho e Melo, 1st Marquis of Pombal, with its capital transferred from São Luís to Belém.
- 1755. Creation of the General Trading Company of Grão-Pará and Maranhão to introduce cotton cultivation in Maranhão and introduction of African slave labor.
- 1759. Expulsion of the Jesuits from Maranhão.
- 1762. Governor's residence converted to administrative office.
- 1766. Governor Joaquim de Melo e Póvoas orders demolition of first Government Palace.
- 1772. State of Maranhão and Grão-Pará split into two different states, the State of Grão-Pará and Rio Negro and the State of Maranhão and Piauí; both autonomous of the Brazilian colonial government.
- 1778. Azulejo tiles first imported to Maranhão from Portugal and used extensively on buildings in the Historic Center of the city.
- 1780. Port of São Luís becomes center of export of cotton and sugar after the United States War of Independence.
- 1787. The pillory erected at the Largo dos Amores.
- 1788. Population of São Luís: 16,580.

== 19th century ==
- 1811. Population of São Luís: approximately 30,000.
- 1812. Completion of the Quinta das Laranjeiras Gate.
- 1814. Completion of the Church of Our Lady of the Rosary, with celebration of first procession and mass.
- 1817
  - Completion and consecration of the Church of São Pantelão.
  - Opening of the Hospital of São José of the Holy House of Mercy (Hospital de São José da Santa Casa de Misericórdia).
  - Opening of the first theater, Teatro União, now Artur Azevedo Theater.
- 1818. Economy of Maranhão reaches one million pounds, and the fourth most populous city in Brazil.
- 1821.
  - February 28. Captaincy of Maranhão becomes the Province of Maranhão under the United Kingdom of Portugal, Brazil and the Algarves.
  - Foundation of the first printing house, Tipografia Nacional; and first newspaper, O Conciliador do Maranhão.
- 1823. Portuguese driven from Maranhão by Admiral Lord Cochrane during Brazil's war of independence.
  - July 28. Maranhão joins the Empire of Brazil, 11 months after the wider Declaration of the Independence of Brazil.
- 1825. First public lighting in São Luís, powered by olive oil, and later turpentine alcohol.
- 1829. Foundling wheel placed in Church of São Pantelão by the Holy House of Mercy.
- 1831.
  - The Setembrada revolt breaks out, calling for the expulsion of Portuguese and the Franciscan friars.
  - Prohibition of burials inside church buildings and mandate of burials outside the city as part of wider sanitary reforms in Brazil.
- 1836. Foundation of first public library.
- 1838. The Balaiada Revolt broke out, a popular movement that opposed the rural aristocracy.
- 1839. Foundation of first high school, Liceu.
- 1840. São Luís has 22 lime mills, six rice mills, six printing presses, three soap and candle factories, two cotton presses, eight potteries.
- 1841.
  - The School of Artisan Education (Escola dos Educandos Artífices) opened at Largo do Diamante (now Praça da República) to educate poor youth.
  - Construction began on the Sagração Wharf (Cais da Sagração).
- 1847. Creation of the Commercial Bank of Maranhão (Banco Comercial do Maranhão).
- 1849. Construction of the Public Slaughterhouse by engineer João Nunes de Campos and Manoel Antônio da Silva Campelo.
- 1852. Establishment of the Portuguese Reading Cabinet (Gabinete Português de Leitura), an intellectual society similar to those in Salvador, Recife, and Rio de Janeiro.
- 1855. Establishment of the Gavião Cemetery, formerly known as the São Pantaleão Cemetery.
- 1852. Reliquary image Relics of Saint Severa brought from Italy and placed in Church of São Pantelão.
- 1854. Companhia Confiança Maranhense established to construct commercial stores for rental.
- 1861. Companhia de Iluminação e Gás do Maranhão installs hydrogen gas lighting.
- 1866. City Chamber establishes building codes to address aesthetic and sanitation issues.
- 1862. Campos Melo Ramp, second ramp built at end Rua do Trapiche.
- 1863. Sidewalk paving in Portuguese lioz stone added as part of modernization of São Luís.
- 1881. Publication of O Mulato by Aluísio Azevedo, a novel about Mixed-race Brazilians in São Luís.
- 1889. Proclamation of the Republic; Province of Maranhão becomes the current state of Maranhão
- 1891. Promulgation of first State Constitution.
- 1896. Façade of Governor's Palace greatly modified under state governor Manuel Inácio Belfort Vieira.

== 20th century ==
- 1906. Governor Benedito Leite begins a large scale urban renewal project in the Historic Center of São Luís, including the modification of the façade of Governor's Palace.
- 1924. Inauguration of the first electric tram in city.
- 1936. Otacílio Saboya Ribeiro implements modernization plan.
- 1939. Marist Brother purchase the Quinta das Laranjeiras and demolish all its buildings with the exception of the monumental gate and Chapel; Marist Brothers College is built on site.
- 1942. 1,000 m (3,300 ft) grass track serves as airbase of the Brazilian Army, and site of future Tirirical Airport.
- 1946. Holy House of Mercy cedes orphanage to Casa das Missões of São José and church to the Archbishop of São Luís.
- 1955. Federal listing of Architectural and Landscape Ensembles of Benedito Leite Square, João Francisco Lisboa Square, Largo do Desterro, and Gonçalves Dias Square.
- 1970. Construction of the Bacanga Dam.
- 1971. Opening of the Governor José Sarney Bridge.
- 1980s. Reggae music gains widespread popularity in the city, earning it nicknames such as the "Brazilian Jamaica".
- 1980. Alumar aluminum factory established in São Luís; production continued to 2015.
- 1983. Alcântara Space Center, the launching facility of the Brazilian Space Agency, established in nearby Alcântara.
- 1972.
  - February 5. Cafuá das Mercês, a former slave auction house, opens as a museum dedicated to the history of slavery in São Luís.
  - October 17. Tirirical Airport renamed Marechal Cunha Machado International Airport.
- 1997. UNESCO declares the World Heritage Site of São Luís.

== 21st century ==
- 2003.
  - August 22. The Alcântara VLS accident, where a rocket ignited on the launch pad of the Alcântara Space Center, killing 21 people.
