= Balama =

- Location within Mozambique
- Coordinates: 13°20′55″S 38°34′11″E
- Country: Mozambique
- Provinces: Cabo Delgado Province
- District: Balama District
- Climate: Aw

Balama is a town in Balama District of Cabo Delgado Province in northern Mozambique. It is the seat of the district.
