= Quissanga District =

Coordinates: 12.4359°S 40.4965°E

- District
- District location in Mozambique
- Country: Mozambique
- Province: Cabo Delgado Province
- Capital: Quissanga

Area
  - Total: 2,150 km^{2} (830 sq mi)

Population (2015)
  - Total: 40,486
  - Density: 18.8/km^{2} (48.8/sq mi)
- Time zone: UTC+3 (EAT)

Quissanga District is a district of Cabo Delgado Province in northern Mozambique. It covers 2,118 square kilometres (818 sq mi) with a population of 50,259 as of 2017.

== Insurgency ==
Quissanga District has been impacted by the Insurgency in Cabo Delgado, with the district's eponymous town of Quissanga being captured by insurgents in 2020. Local residents have reported insurgents in the area committing acts of indiscriminate attacks, torture, arson, and the use of child soldiers. As a result, a number of people once residing in Quissanga District have become internally displaced persons, fleeing to other regions, such as Pemba and Metuge. As of March 2021, Quissanga District was inaccessible to United Nations officials due to the unrest.

== Demographics ==
Historical population
Year	Pop.	±%
1997	34,328	—
2007	37,771	+10.0%
2017	50,259	+33.1%

According to Mozambique's 2017 census, Quissanga District has a population of 50,259. Of this population, there are 24,517 males, 25,742 females, 23,435 people aged 14 and under, 24,746 people aged 15 to 64, and 2,078 people aged 65 and up.
