= Nangana =

Nangana may refer to:

- Nangana, Mozambique
- Nangana, Victoria, Australia
