= Maria Velotti =

Italian religious sister

Blessed Maria Velotti TOSF
- Born: 16 November 1826; Soccavo, Naples, Kingdom of the Two Sicilies
- Died: 3 September 1886 (aged 59); Casoria, Naples, Kingdom of Italy
- Venerated in: Roman Catholic Church
- Beatified: 26 September 2020, Naples, Italy by Cardinal Crescenzio Sepe
- Feast: 2 September

Maria Velotti (16 November 1826 - 3 September 1886), religious name Maria Luigia del Santissimo Sacramento, was an Italian religious sister. She was a member in the Third Order of Saint Francis and the founder of the Suore Francescane Adoratrici della Santa Croce. In her childhood she was raised in two different households after her parents died and she was exposed to the Franciscan charism under her second spiritual director. In 1854 she was professed into the Franciscan Third Order and in 1877 founded her religious order. Velotti also experienced several visions in her life such as visions of Jesus Christ and Francis of Assisi. Pope Francis beatified her in 2020.

== Life ==
Maria Velotti was born in Soccavo in Naples on 16 November 1826 to Francesco Velotti and Teresa Napoletano. Her baptism was celebrated on that same date in the Santi Pietro e Paolo church in Soccavo.

Her parents died before she turned two circa 1828 and she was sent to live with her unmarried aunt Caterina (who lived in Sirico near Nola) who would over time come to mistreat and abuse her. Her half-brother Giovanni (from her father's first marriage) remained in Soccavo and a chance meeting between the two in adulthood revealed their familial connection. Her initial education came from the local parish priest since there were no public schools in the area at that time and in her childhood was sometimes referred to as "Mariella". Her aunt's abuse extended to her spiritual life and she would often be assigned to housework so that she could not reflect on God in silence; her housework often took over two hours. But her situation became untenable at home and her married (and childless) neighbors Lorenzo Sabatino and Giuseppa Tuzzolo took her in and raised her as their own. Velotti could barely read or write.

In her adolescence her first spiritual director and confessor was the priest Domenico Piciocchi but a chance meeting put her in contact with her second confessor and spiritual director when she turned 23. The teen met the priest Filippo Antonio da Domicella (who happened to be visiting the church) and under him she fostered a desire to join the Franciscans. The priest oversaw her vesting in the habit in the San Giovanni Evangelista convent-church in Taurano on 2 February 1853 and oversaw her profession into the Third Order of Saint Francis on 22 February 1854. Velotti took her religious name in honor of Aloysius Gonzaga and Paschal Baylón. In 1853 she started to experience visions of Jesus Christ on the cross alongside the Blessed Mother and Francis of Assisi; she also experienced visions of demonic harassment that once left her immobile and bedridden. Velotti also used iron tools for self-mortification.

Her order was established in 1877 (alongside the widow Eletta Albini who later became Sister Maria Francesca) and it was aimed at educating girls and to promote the role of women in Neapolitan life. Her intention was also to dedicate herself to various charitable initiatives throughout Naples. Permission for the order's founding came from both the Cardinal Archbishop of Naples Sisto Riario Sforza and the Minister General of the Order of Friars Minor Bernardino da Portogruaro. Her reputation for piousness and her visions extended to the surrounding regions and Sforza (before his death in 1877) visited Velotti several times in order to better acquaint himself with her and understand her ideas. Her third spiritual director (she was hesitant in having another director) was Michelangelo da Marigliano. In 1884 she relocated to Casoria to the motherhouse where she would live until her death and spent her last weeks in a wheelchair with paralysis.

Her death came after suffering from ill health for a prolonged period; she died in the order's motherhouse on 3 September 1886 at 9:00am in Casoria. Her remains have been housed in the order's motherhouse since 26 December 1926.

== Beatification ==
Her beatification cause launched in the 1920s and she became titled as a Servant of God. Her spiritual writings were approved by theologians on 3 December 1944. Pope Francis confirmed her heroic virtue and titled her as venerable in 2016 while later approving a miracle attributed to her in 2019 which would enable for her beatification. The celebration was celebrated on 26 September 2020. The postulator for the cause is the Franciscan Giovangiuseppe Califano.
