= Ibo District =

Coordinates: 12°21′S 40°38′E

- District
- District location in Mozambique
- Country: Mozambique
- Province: Cabo Delgado Province
- Capital: Vila do Ibo

Area
  - Total: 75 km^{2} (29 sq mi)

Population (2015)
  - Total: 11,742
  - Density: 160/km^{2} (410/sq mi)
- Time zone: UTC+3 (EAT)

Ibo District is a small district of Cabo Delgado Province in northern Mozambique. Its principal town is Vila do Ibo on Ibo Island.
