= Limia (disambiguation) =

Limia is a genus of livebearing fishes belonging to the Cyprinodontiform family Poeciliidae.

Limia may also refer to:

- Limia, Mozambique, a village
- Limia River, in Galicia, Spain, and Portugal
- A Limia, a comarca in the Province of Ourense, Galicia, Spain
- Limia Cattle, a breed from the Province of Ourense
- Alejandro Limia (born 1975), Argentine footballer
- Camino Limia (born 1983 or 1984), Spanish former politician
