= Quissanga =

Quissanga may refer to:

- Quissanga District, Mozambique
- Bartolomeu Jacinto Quissanga, an Angolan footballer who plays defender for Lazio
- Fernando Jacinto Quissanga, an Angolan footballer who plays for FC Rostov.
