= Megaruma River =

River in Mozambique

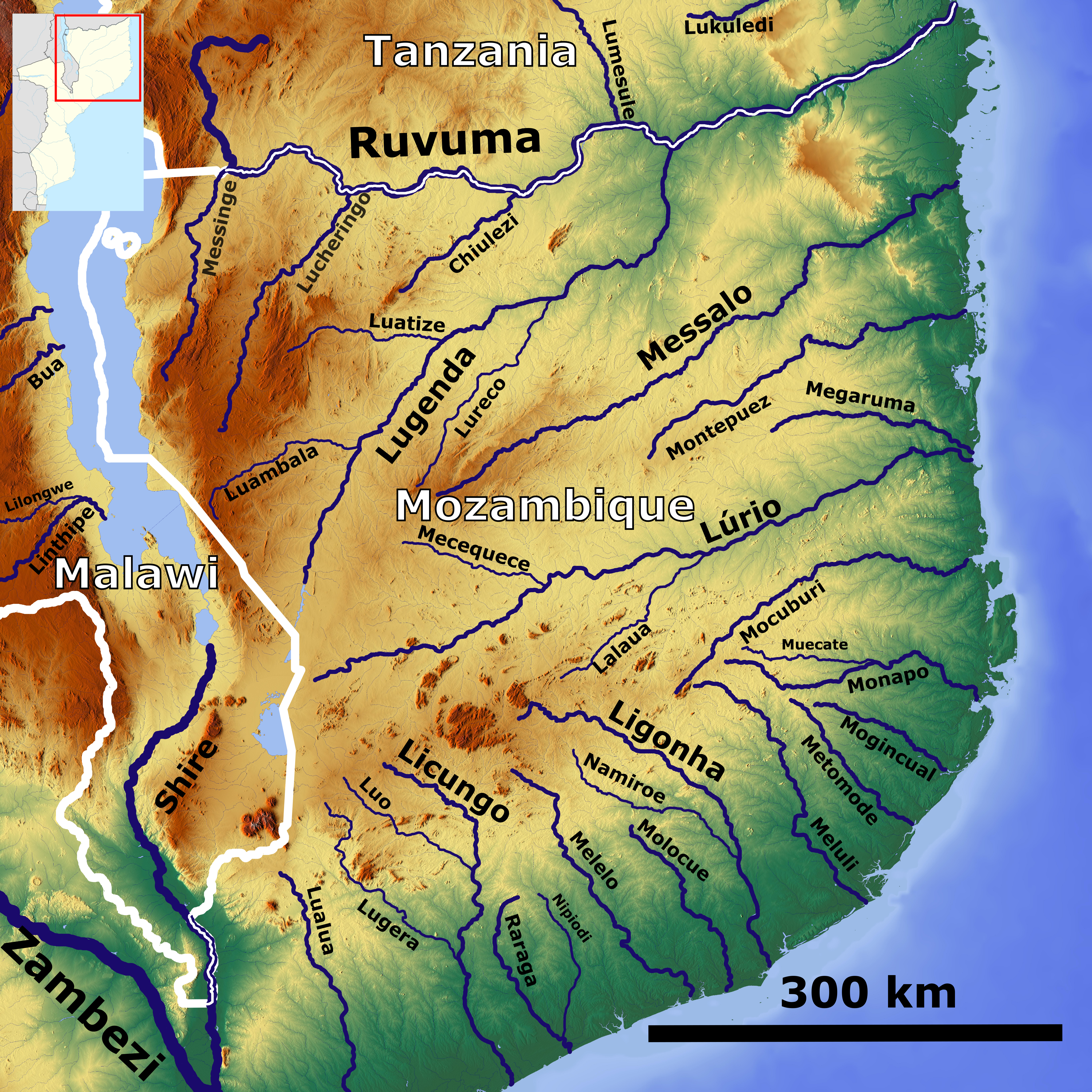
The Megaruma River in northern Mozambique (center right)

The Megaruma is a river of northeastern Mozambique, flowing through Ancuabe District. It has its source to the northeast in Mount Mecumba. A bridge was built over the river in 1954.
