= List of provinces of Mozambique by Human Development Index =

This is a list of provinces of Mozambique by Human Development Index as of 2025 with data for the year 2023.

Rank	Region	HDI (2023)
Medium human development
1	Maputo City	0.661
2	Maputo Province	0.633
Low human development
3	Gaza	0.530
4	Inhambane	0.522
5	Sofala	0.516
6	Manica	0.511
–	Mozambique (average)	0.493
7	Tete	0.473
8	Nampula	0.449
9	Cabo Delgado	0.446
9	Zambezia	0.446
11	Niassa	0.443

== See also ==
- List of countries by Human Development Index
