= Balama mine =

Graphite mine in Capo Delgado Province, Mozambique

Location
- Location: Capo Delgado Province, Mozambique

Production
- Products: Graphite

The Balama mine is one of the largest graphite mines in Mozambique and in the world. The mine is located in the northern part of the country in Cabo Delgado Province. The mine has estimated reserves of 1.15 billion tonnes of ore 10.2% graphite.

== Geography and geology ==
The Balama mine is located West of Montepuez in the Namuno District of Cabo Delgado Province in Northern Mozambique over an area of 106km² mining concession.

Most of the graphite is in layers of graphitic schists in a ridge and three hills up to 250m above the surrounding plains. The area also contains 1.15bt vanadium, which the owner planned to develop under a separate project, named the Balama Vanadium Project.

== Description ==
The Balama mine is a low strip ratio, open-pit mine This means, the material is shoveled and then trucked to a processing plant, where the material is crushed and screened, ground before flotation, filtration and drying, classification and screening, and bagging. The two billion cubic metres of water per year for this process comes from the Chipembe Dam, which is 12km away.

The processing plant produces about 350,000 tonnes per annum (tpa) of graphite concentrate from an ore throughput of two million tonnes per year. The power for this plant has comes from diesel generators (15.4MW on-site consisting of seven 2.2MW generators) and later from an additional 11.25 MWp solar photovoltaic array. It was planned to power the plant from the national grid in the fifth year of operations.

By 2025, a tailings storage facility needed to be expanded.

== History ==
In May 2015, Syrah Resources completed a feasibility study and by November 2017 it produced its first output; Production began in 2019. During the COVID-19 pandemic it suspended operations for 1 year from March 2020 until March 2021.

In December 2024, the owner of the mine Syrah Resources suspended operations because of farmers protests since September. The protests were due to unsttled grievances because of resettlement. They could suspend because they received a waiver to service their debtor the US International Development Finance Corporation, for "default events", akin to invoking force majeure.
