= Nangade District =

Coordinates: 11.074°S 39.673°E

- District
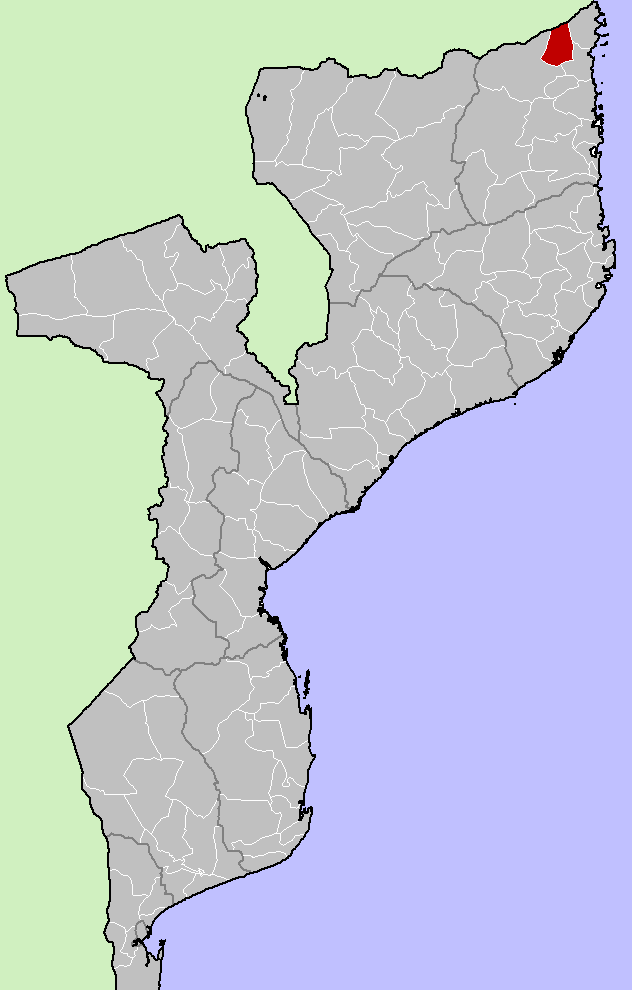
- District location in Mozambique
- Country: Mozambique
- Province: Cabo Delgado Province
- Capital: Nangade

Area
  - Total: 3,005 km^{2} (1,160 sq mi)

Population (2015)
  - Total: 71,588
  - Density: 23.82/km^{2} (61.70/sq mi)
- Time zone: UTC+3 (EAT)

Nangade District is a district of Cabo Delgado Province in northern Mozambique. It covers 3,005 km^{2} with 71,588 inhabitants (2015). It is bordered by Mtwara Region, Tanzania to the north.
