= Meluco District =

Coordinates: 12.543°S 39.644°E

- District
- District location in Mozambique
- Country: Mozambique
- Province: Cabo Delgado Province
- Capital: Meluco

Area
  - Total: 5,799 km^{2} (2,239 sq mi)

Population (2015)
  - Total: 26,221
  - Density: 4.522/km^{2} (11.71/sq mi)
- Time zone: UTC+3 (EAT)

Meluco District is a district of Cabo Delgado Province in northern Mozambique. It covers 5,799 km² with 26,221 inhabitants.
