= Giole =

Giole Γκιόλε
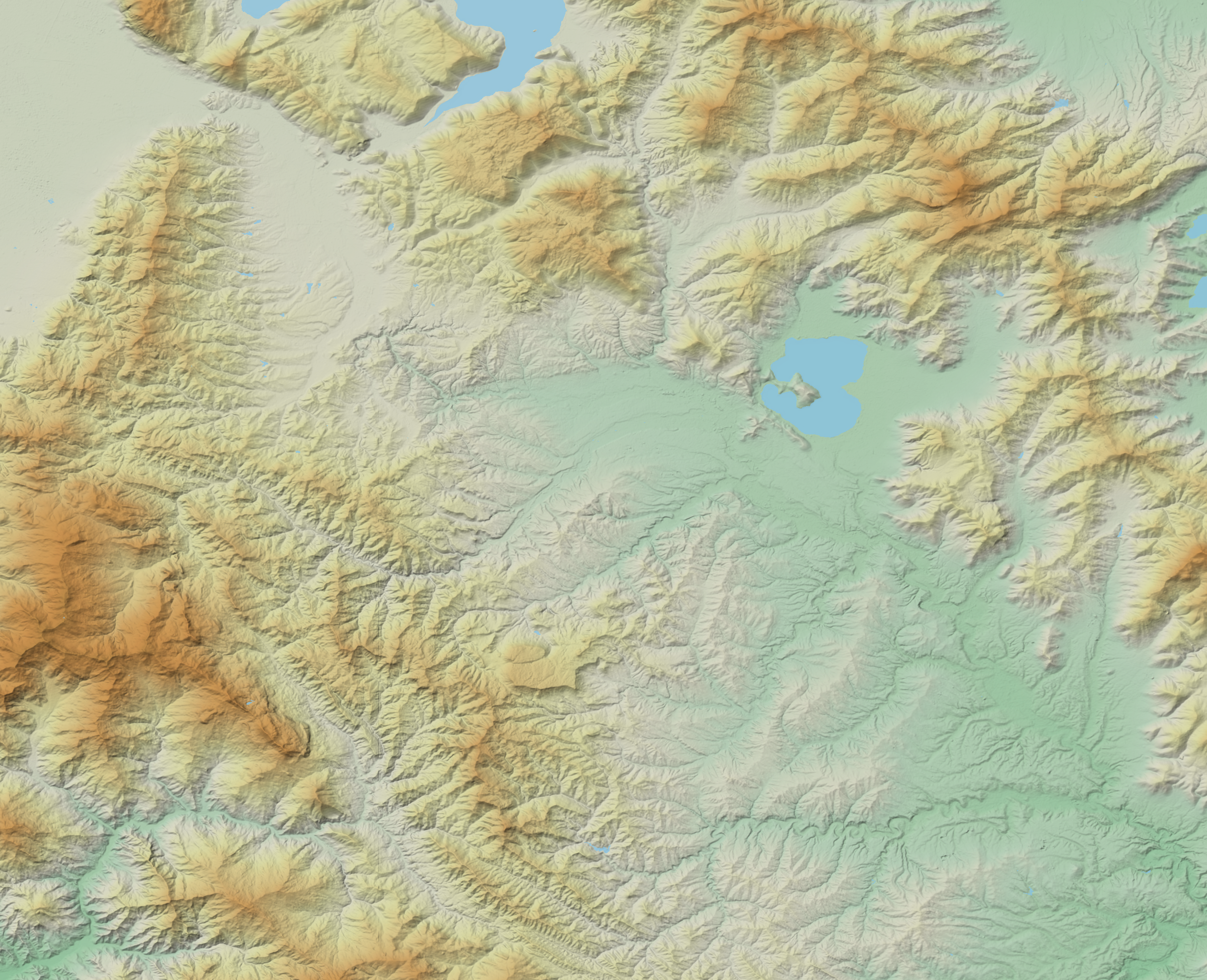

Location
- Countries: Greece
- Region: Kastoria, Aegean Macedonia

Physical characteristics
- Source
  - location: Lake Kastoria east of Dupjak
  - coordinates: 40.4870°N 21.3091°E
- Mouth
  - location: Aliakmonas River south of Nea Kotaratsa
  - coordinates: 40.4193°N 21.3371°E
- Length: 10 km (6.2 mi)

Giole (also known as Ezerska Reka or Kourti; Greek: Γκιόλε, Gióli, Góli) is a river in the Kastoria region of Aegean Macedonia. It is 10 km long.

== Location ==
The river is the only outflow from Lake Kastoria. Its name originates from the Turkish term göl meaning “lake.” It flows from the southern end of the lake, 1.85 km east of Dupjak and west of Krpeni, flowing southwards in meanders. It passes under the main road from Kastoria to Klisoura, flowing by Zdravltsi, Slimnishta, and Nea Kotaratsa before it joins the Aliakmonas as a left tributary.

Revolutionary Georgi Hristov wrote about the river:

Not far from the mouth of the last (Belivod), the Aliakmonas gathers the Ezerska waters. The Ezerska River, always full and perpetually clear, flows completely quietly through a deep bed, almost impassable. A narrow corridor separates it from the barren, stony and rocky Sarakina Mountain.

At the outflow of the Giole from the lake, a dam was built by French engineers in 1916. In 1932, a concrete spillway with movable gates was constructed to control the lake's water level. Later, the gates were replaced with electric ones, located 550 m from the lake's shoreline to channel water into the river. Experimental regulation of the gates in 2016 improved the lake's water quality from poor in 2014 to moderate in 2016.
