= Montepuez =

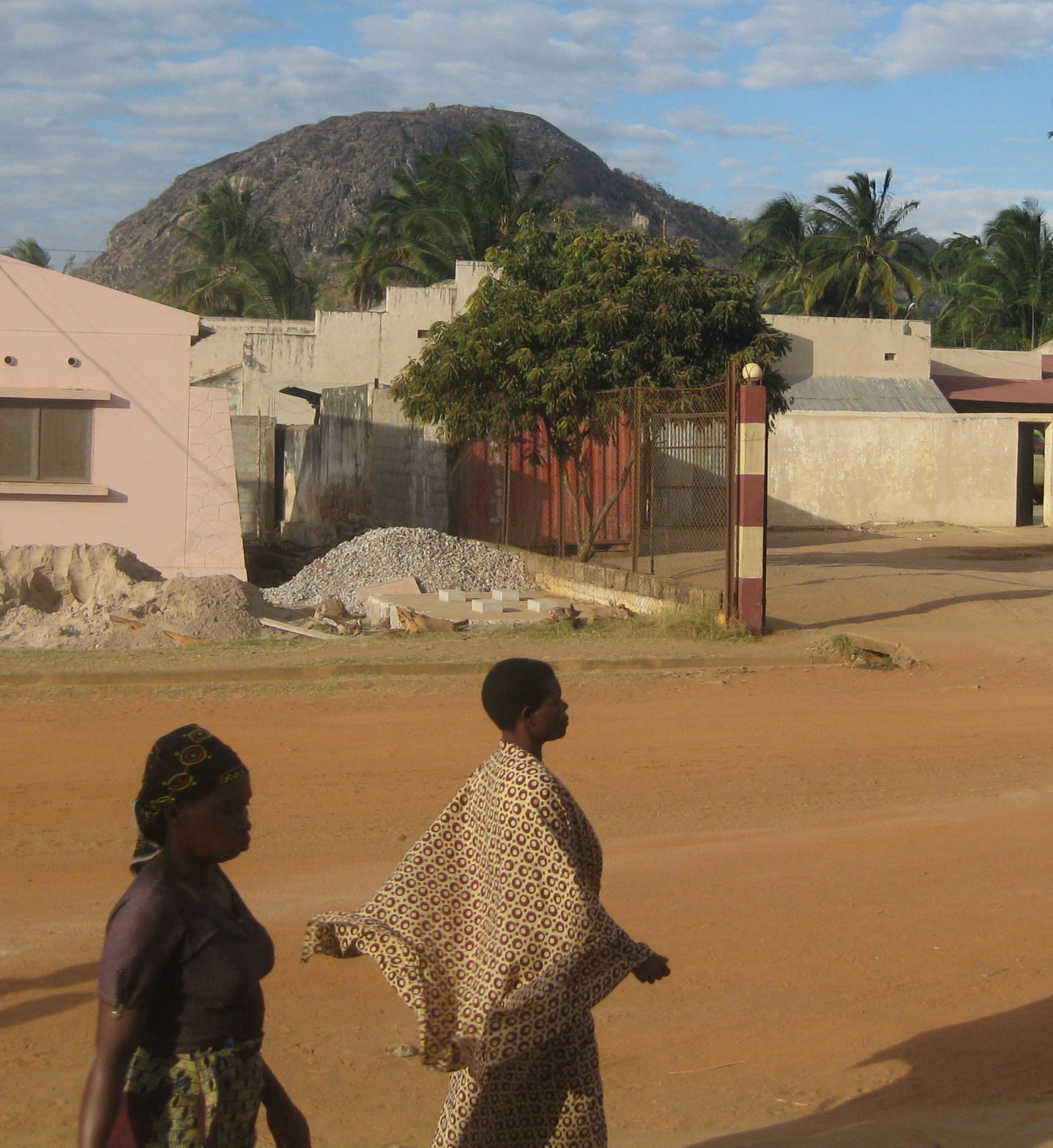

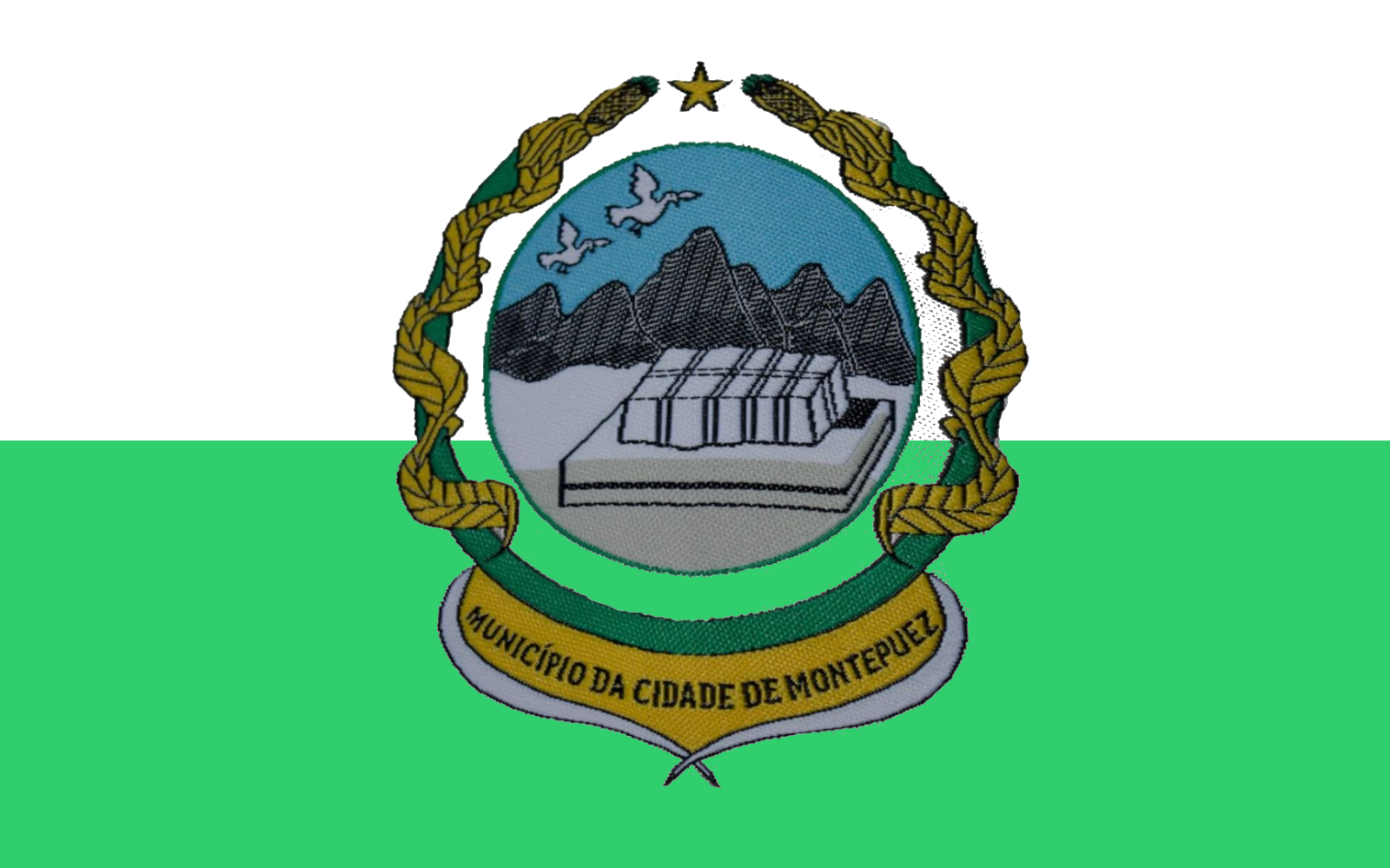
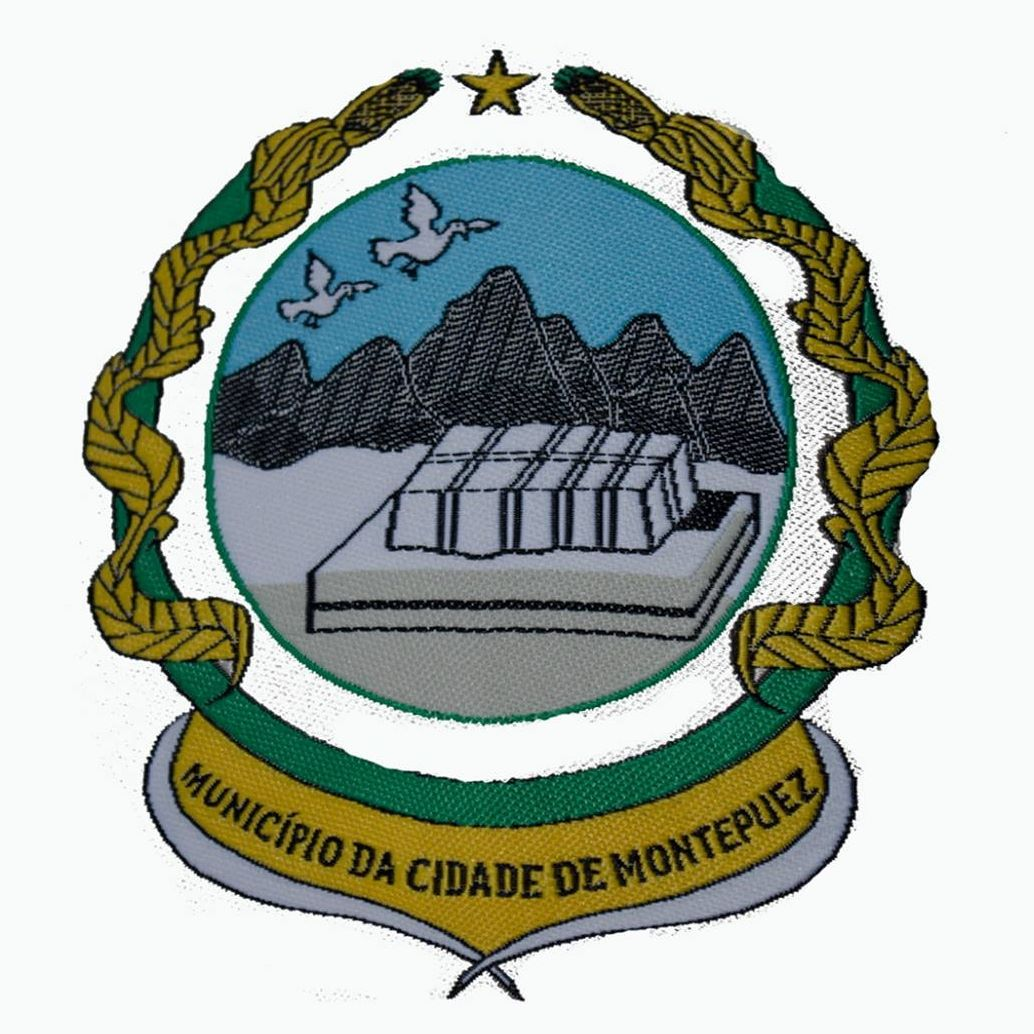
- Flag Seal

- Location within Mozambique
- Coordinates: 13°07′S 39°0′E
- Country: Mozambique
- Provinces: Cabo Delgado Province

Population (2007 census)
  - Total: 76,139

Montepuez is the second largest city in the province of Cabo Delgado in Mozambique, after the provincial capital of Pemba.

It is the seat of Montepuez District.

== Economy ==
Since 2011, Montepuez has been one of the world's largest producers of rubies. Discovered in 2009, the ruby deposits here are thought to potentially comprise 40% of the world's ruby supply.

== Demographics ==
Year	Population
1997	58,594
2007	76,004
2015	230,013

== Climate ==
Climate data for Montepuez
Month	Jan	Feb	Mar	Apr	May	Jun	Jul	Aug	Sep	Oct	Nov	Dec	Year
Mean daily maximum °C (°F)	30 (86)	31 (87)	31 (87)	30 (86)	29 (85)	28 (82)	27 (81)	29 (84)	31 (87)	33 (91)	34 (93)	32 (90)	31 (87)
Mean daily minimum °C (°F)	21 (69)	21 (69)	20 (68)	19 (67)	17 (63)	16 (60)	15 (59)	15 (59)	17 (62)	18 (64)	19 (67)	21 (69)	18 (65)
Average precipitation mm (inches)	250 (9.7)	220 (8.5)	200 (7.9)	64 (2.5)	10 (0.4)	2.5 (0.1)	2.5 (0.1)	2.5 (0.1)	0 (0)	7.6 (0.3)	41 (1.6)	150 (6)	940 (37.1)
Source: Weatherbase
