= Montepuez District =

Coordinates: 13°07′S 39°00′E

- District
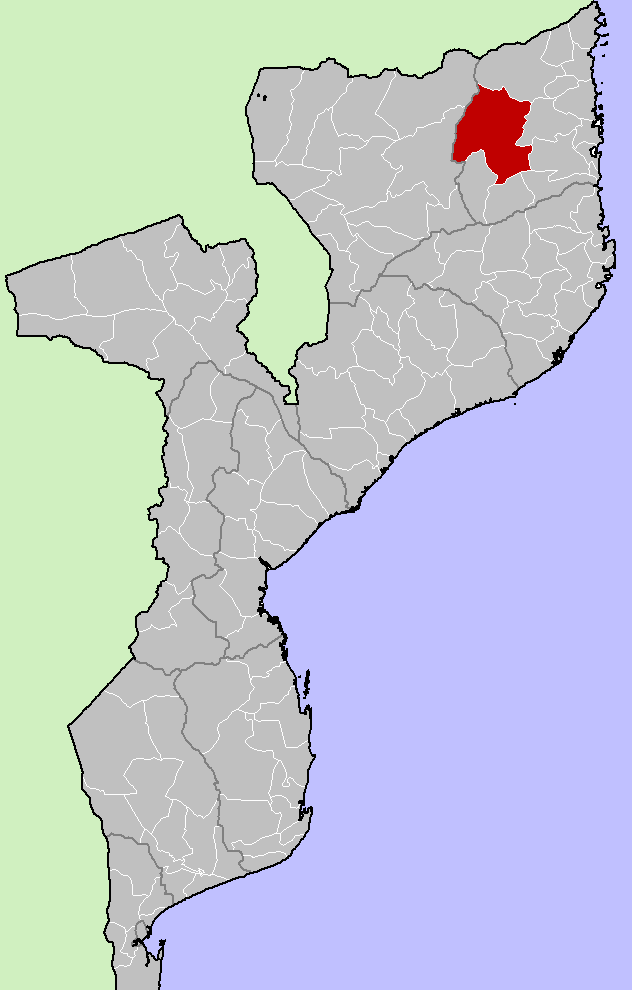
- District location in Mozambique
- Country: Mozambique
- Province: Cabo Delgado Province
- Capital: Montepuez

Area
  - Total: 17,964 km^{2} (6,936 sq mi)

Population (2015)
  - Total: 230,013
  - Density: 12.804/km^{2} (33.162/sq mi)
- Time zone: UTC+3 (EAT)

Montepuez District is a district of Cabo Delgado Province in northern Mozambique. It seat lies at Montepuez town.
