= Balama District =

Coordinates: 13.345°S 38.571°E

- District
- District location in Mozambique
- Country: Mozambique
- Province: Cabo Delgado Province
- Capital: Balama

Area
  - Total: 5,540 km^{2} (2,140 sq mi)

Population (2015)
  - Total: 142,968
  - Density: 25.8/km^{2} (66.8/sq mi)
- Time zone: UTC+3 (EAT)

Balama District is a district of Cabo Delgado Province in northern Mozambique. It covers 5,540 km^{2} with 142,968 inhabitants.

The district is divided into four administrative posts, which include the following localities:

- Posto Administrativo de Balama:
  - Balama
  - Muripa
  - Ntete
- Posto Administrativo de Impiiri:
  - Namara
  - Savaca
- Posto Administrativo de Kuékué:
  - Jamira
  - Tauane
- Posto Administrativo de Mavala:
  - Mavala
  - Mpaka
