= Metuge District =

Coordinates: 12°58′S 40°33′E

- District
- District location in Mozambique
- Country: Mozambique
- Province: Cabo Delgado Province

Area
  - Total: 1,612 km^{2} (622 sq mi)

Population (2015)
  - Total: 82,113
  - Density: 50.94/km^{2} (131.9/sq mi)
- Time zone: UTC+3 (EAT)

Metuge District is a district of Cabo Delgado Province in northern Mozambique.
