= Chiúre District =

Coordinates: 13.380°S 39.952°E

- District
- District location in Mozambique
- Country: Mozambique
- Province: Cabo Delgado Province
- Capital: Chiúre

Area
  - Total: 5,439 km^{2} (2,100 sq mi)

Population (2015)
  - Total: 248,381
  - Density: 45.67/km^{2} (118.3/sq mi)
- Time zone: UTC+3 (EAT)

Chiúre District is a district of Cabo Delgado Province in northern Mozambique. It covers 5,439 km^{2} with 248,381 inhabitants.

The district is divided into six administrative posts, which include the following localities:

- Posto Administrativo de Chiúre:
  - Chiúre (Vila),
  - Jonga, e
  - Milamba
- Posto Administrativo de Chiúre-Velho:
  - Micolene, e
  - Salave,
- Posto Administrativo de Katapua:
  - Meculane
- Posto Administrativo de Mazeze:
  - Juravo,
  - Mazeze, e
  - Murocue
- Posto Administrativo de Namogelia:
  - Bilibiza
- Posto Administrativo de Ocua:
  - Marera,
  - Ocua, e
  - Samora Machel
