= Mesa, Mozambique =

Mesa
- Location in Mozambique
- Coordinates: 13°1′46″S 39°33′13″E
- Country: Mozambique
- Province: Cabo Delgado Province
- District: Ancuabe District
- Time zone: UTC+2 (Central Africa Time)

Mesa is a town in Ancuabe District in Cabo Delgado Province in northeastern Mozambique.

It is located south-west of the district capital of Ancuabe.
