= Sirico =

Sirico is a surname of Italian origin. Notable people with the surname include:

- Robert Sirico (born 1951), American Roman Catholic priest
- Tony Sirico (1942–2022), American character actor

== See also ==
- Sirio
- Sirica
- Serpico
