= Pemba, Mozambique =

Pemba
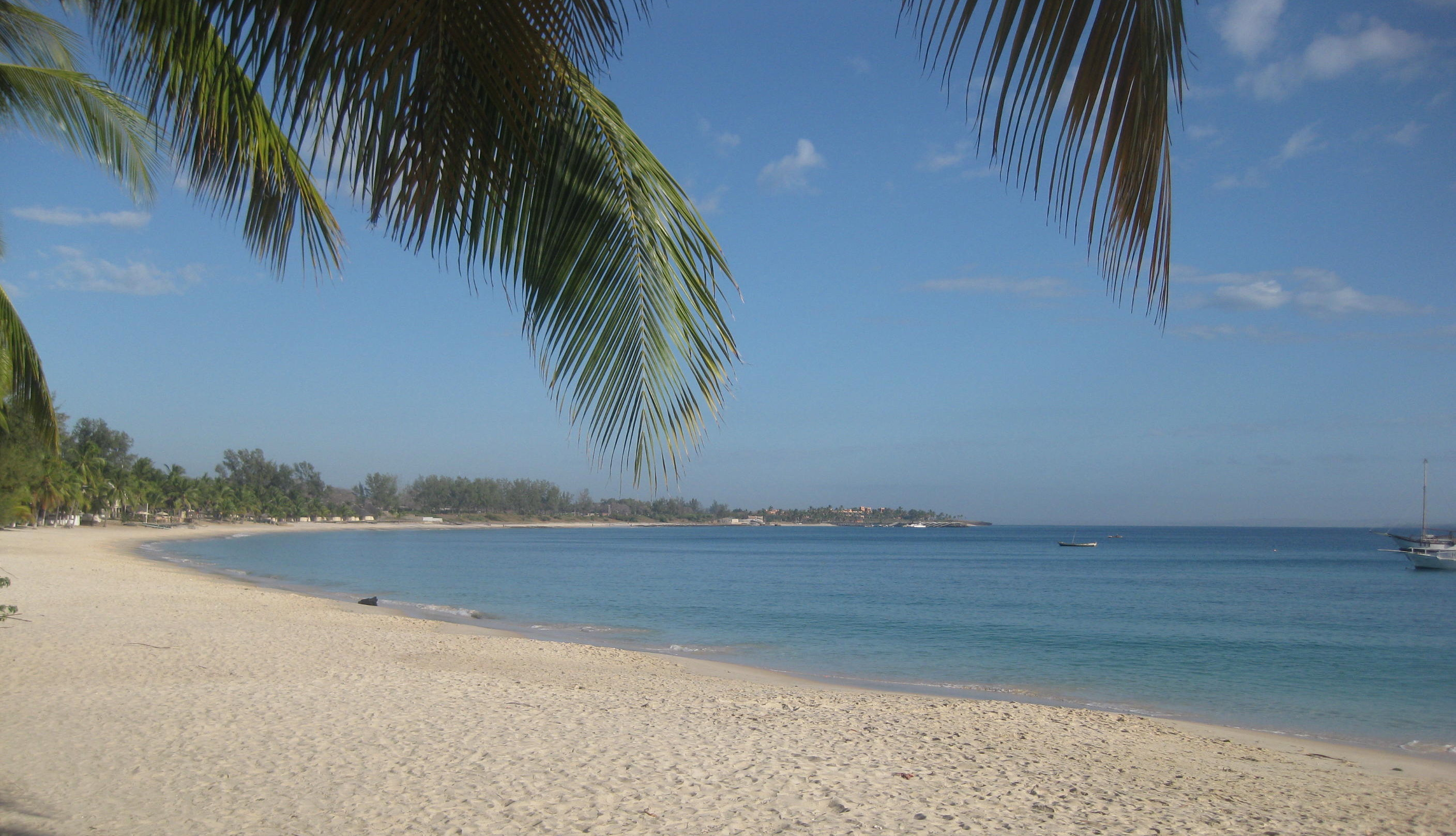

- Location within Mozambique Location within Africa
- Coordinates: 12°58′S 40°33′E
- Country: Mozambique
- Provinces: Cabo Delgado Province
- City Status: 1904

Area
  - Total: 19.79 km^{2} (7.64 sq mi)
- Elevation: 30 m (98 ft)

Population (2017 census)
  - Total: 201,846
  - Density: 10,200/km^{2} (26,420/sq mi)
- Area code: (+258) 272
- Climate: Aw

Pemba [ˈpẽbɐ] is a port city and district in Mozambique. It is the capital and largest city of the Cabo Delgado province and lies on a peninsula in Pemba Bay, the third largest in Africa. It is located northeast of Maputo, Mozambique's capital.

Pemba is known as a prime destination for water sport and diving enthusiasts due to the bay and coral reef that surrounds the city. Whales, sunfish, sea turtles, and other various oceanic wildlife are known to frequent Pemba's coast.

== History ==
There is no record of the town's existence or settlement before the 20th century, mainly serving as fishing ground for visiting Malagasy and Swahili fishermen. The first attempt at settlement was made by the Portuguese with a temporary fort that was dismantled after a few years in the late 1800s.

The town was founded by the land-controlling and recently formed Niassa Company in 1898 as a small trading port. It was shortly renamed as Porto Amélia, after the last Queen of Portugal, Amélie of Orléans.

After the end of the Niassa Company in 1929, Pemba was transferred to direct Portuguese control and became the capital of the newly created district of Cabo Delgado. It took the place of the nearby village of Ibo, in part due to Pemba's access to large ships. It was renamed Pemba at the end of Portuguese rule, in 1975.

The city's inhabitants are primarily Swahili, Makondes, Macuas and Mwanis. Local languages that are spoken are Kimwani and Makhuwa, although Portuguese is widespread.

Pemba is taking refugees in the aftermath of the Battle of Palma, but has not yet been directly involved in the ongoing Insurgency in Cabo Delgado.

== International relations ==
Pemba is twinned with:

- Aveiro, Portugal
- Reggio Emilia, Italy

== Demographics ==
Year	Population
1997 census	84,897
2007 census	138,716
2017 census	201,846

== Municipality ==
The municipality of Pemba covers 100 km^{2} and recorded 201,846 people in the 2017 census. The actual settlement, however, is mostly just the tip that faces the bay, with most of the land undeveloped.

== Climate ==
Pemba has a tropical savanna climate (Köppen climate classification Aw). Temperatures fluctuate little throughout the year due to the city's tropical location and closeness to the equator. It has only two seasons. The wet season is from December to April and brings heavy but reliable rainfall, the wettest month typically being March with an average rainfall of 202.2 mm (7.96 in). Conversely, the dry season stretches from May to November and brings marginally cooler temperatures, sunny skies, and very little rain, the driest month typically being September with an average rainfall of 2.2 mm (0.09 in). Humidity is very high during the wet season, averaging 80-90%, but is much lower in the dry season. The warmest months are January and February and the coolest is July.

Climate data for Pemba (1991–2020 normals, extremes 1961–1990, 2007–2023)
Month	Jan	Feb	Mar	Apr	May	Jun	Jul	Aug	Sep	Oct	Nov	Dec	Year
Record high °C (°F)	35.9 (96.6)	34.5 (94.1)	36.0 (96.8)	35.8 (96.4)	33.5 (92.3)	31.8 (89.2)	30.7 (87.3)	31.8 (89.2)	33.4 (92.1)	33.6 (92.5)	35.2 (95.4)	35.7 (96.3)	36.0 (96.8)
Mean daily maximum °C (°F)	30.7 (87.3)	31.3 (88.3)	30.8 (87.4)	30.6 (87.1)	29.8 (85.6)	28.2 (82.8)	27.1 (80.8)	27.7 (81.9)	29.0 (84.2)	29.6 (85.3)	30.4 (86.7)	31.1 (88.0)	29.7 (85.5)
Daily mean °C (°F)	27.4 (81.3)	27.2 (81.0)	26.2 (79.2)	26.7 (80.1)	25.4 (77.7)	23.9 (75.0)	23.4 (74.1)	23.7 (74.7)	24.7 (76.5)	25.9 (78.6)	27.2 (81.0)	27.7 (81.9)	25.8 (78.4)
Mean daily minimum °C (°F)	24.5 (76.1)	23.8 (74.8)	24.1 (75.4)	23.0 (73.4)	20.8 (69.4)	19.8 (67.6)	19.7 (67.5)	19.6 (67.3)	20.5 (68.9)	22.5 (72.5)	24.4 (75.9)	24.9 (76.8)	22.3 (72.1)
Record low °C (°F)	19.5 (67.1)	18.9 (66.0)	19.5 (67.1)	17.3 (63.1)	16.8 (62.2)	14.7 (58.5)	11.8 (53.2)	11.7 (53.1)	16.1 (61.0)	18.5 (65.3)	20.3 (68.5)	21.4 (70.5)	16.5 (61.7)
Average precipitation mm (inches)	146.4 (5.76)	156.0 (6.14)	202.2 (7.96)	122.0 (4.80)	32.4 (1.28)	15.0 (0.59)	11.3 (0.44)	7.9 (0.31)	2.2 (0.09)	11.3 (0.44)	41.6 (1.64)	124.5 (4.90)	872.8 (34.36)
Average precipitation days (≥ 1.0 mm)	11.0	10.4	12.6	9.4	3.2	2.4	1.6	1.2	0.6	1.5	3.6	8.4	65.9
Average relative humidity (%)	80	82	81	76	74	72	71	71	72	73	74	77	75
Mean monthly sunshine hours	201.5	175.2	201.5	216.0	238.7	225.0	226.3	260.4	261.0	288.3	276.0	232.5	2,802.4
Mean daily sunshine hours	6.5	6.2	6.5	7.2	7.7	7.5	7.3	8.4	8.7	9.3	9.2	7.5	7.7
Source 1: World Meteorological Organization (precipitation 1961–1990) Starlings Roost Weather
Source 2: Deutscher Wetterdienst (extremes, humidity and sun 1961–1990)

== Infrastructure ==
Pemba is connected to the rest of Mozambique through the N1 Highway, which leads directly to Montepuez to its west. It is also directly connected to Mecúfi via highway connection.

A port is located in Pemba and serves as the main logistics hub for the Cabo Delgado province.

Pemba Airport provides domestic and international flights to Johannesburg, South Africa and Nairobi, Kenya.

== See also ==
- Pemba Airport
- Southern African Development Community Mission in Mozambique (SAMIM)
