= Pemba Airport (Mozambique) =

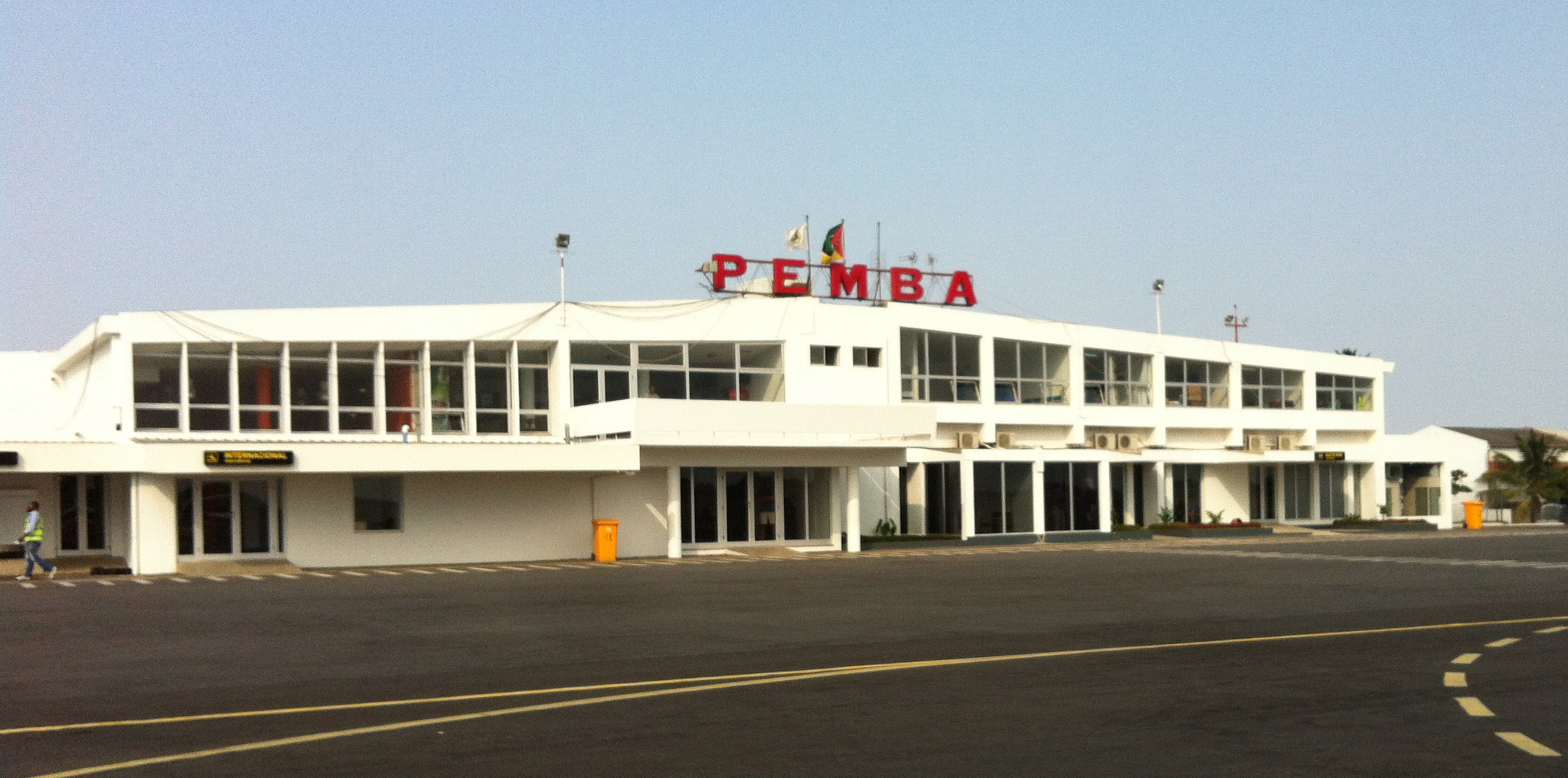
- IATA: POL; ICAO: FQPB

Summary
- Airport type: Public
- Operator: Aeroportos de Mocambique (Mozambique Airports Company)
- Serves: Pemba
- Location: Pemba, Mozambique
- Elevation AMSL: 331 ft / 96 m
- Coordinates: 12°59′12″S 040°31′21″E

Map
- Location of airport in Mozambique

Runways
Direction	Length		Surface
Direction	ft	m	Surface
08/26	2,625	784	Asphalt
17/35	5,905	1,800	Asphalt

Pemba Airport (IATA: POL, ICAO: FQPB) is a small international airport in Pemba, Mozambique.

== Airlines and destinations ==
=== Passenger ===
Airlines	Destinations
Airlink	Johannesburg–O. R. Tambo
LAM Mozambique Airlines	Dar es Salaam, Johannesburg–O. R. Tambo, Maputo, Nairobi–Jomo Kenyatta

=== Cargo ===
Airlines	Destinations
Astral Aviation	Nairobi–Jomo Kenyatta
