= Ancuabe =

- Location within Mozambique
- Coordinates: 12°59′S 39°51′E
- Country: Mozambique
- Provinces: Cabo Delgado Province
- District: Ancuabe District

Population (1997)
  - Total: 12,561

Ancuabe is a town in eastern Mozambique in Ancuabe District, Cabo Delgado Province. It is the seat of the district. According to the 1997 census it has a population of 12,561.

== Geography ==
Ancuabe is situated 1.2 miles (1.9 km) away from Ntete, 2.1 miles (3.4 km) away from Banjira and 1.7 miles (2.7 km) away from Muero.

== Economy ==
Mining plays a key role in the local economy. In 1989 the Irish-based Kenmare Resources joined the Government in a joint venture with the Mozambiquan government to exploit graphite deposits in Ancuabe.

Graphites de Ancuabe Ltda. operated a sizeable mine and plant near Ancuabe from 1994 to 1999. The mined graphite would be transported east to the larger town of Pemba on the coast where the mined material would be cut and processed. Due to a fall in graphite prices work in the mine was suspended in 1999. In 2007, the Mozambique government announced its intention to re-open the mine, depending on the supply of electricity from the Cahora Bassa dam.

Graphite mining in the Ancuabe region resumed in 2017 with the opening of a mine operated by the Dutch firm AMG.

== Transport ==
The nearest airport is at Pemba Airport, 39 miles (63 km) away.
