= Districts of Mozambique =

List of districts of Mozambique

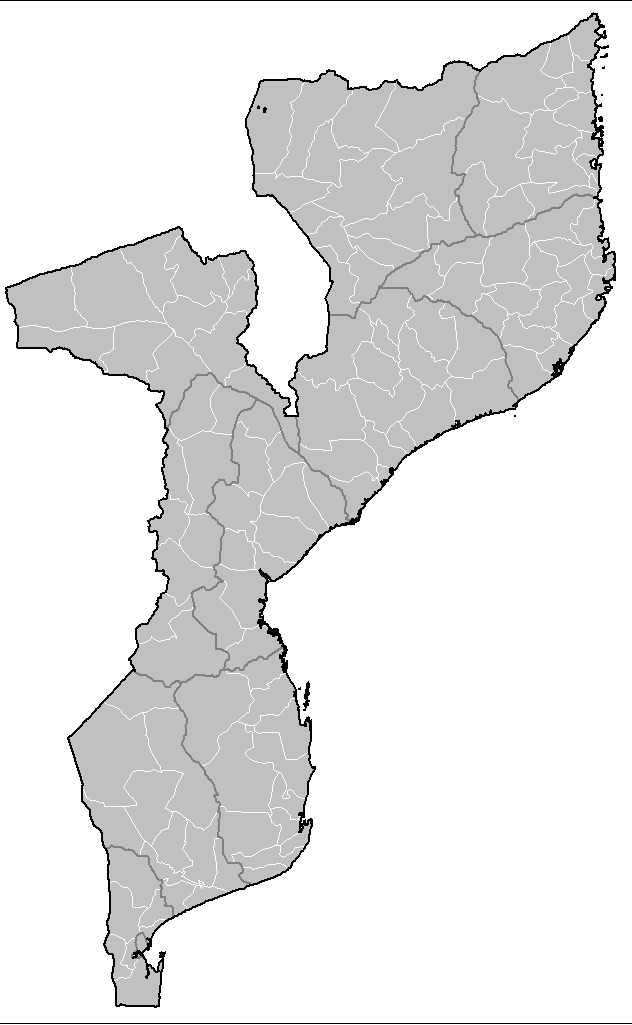
Districts of Mozambique

The provinces of Mozambique are divided into 128 districts. The districts are listed below, by province:

== Cabo Delgado Province ==
- Ancuabe District
- Balama District
- Chiúre District
- Ibo District
- Macomia District
- Mecúfi District
- Meluco District
- Metuge District
- Mocímboa da Praia District
- Montepuez District
- Mueda District
- Muidumbe District
- Namuno District
- Nangade District
- Palma District
- Quissanga District

== Gaza Province ==
- Bilene Macia District
- Chibuto District
- Chicualacuala District
- Chigubo District
- Chókwè District
- Guijá District
- Mabalane District
- Manjacaze District
- Massangena District
- Massingir District
- Xai-Xai District

== Inhambane Province ==
- Funhalouro District
- Govuro District
- Homoine District
- Inharrime District
- Inhassoro District
- Jangamo District
- Mabote District
- Massinga District
- Maxixe District
- Morrumbene District
- Panda District
- Vilanculos District
- Zavala District

== Manica Province ==
- Báruè District
- Gondola District
- Guro District
- Machaze District
- Macossa District
- Manica District
- Mossurize District
- Sussundenga District
- Tambara District

== Maputo City ==
- Maputo

== Maputo Province ==
- Boane District
- Magude District
- Manhiça District
- Marracuene District
- Matutuíne District
- Moamba District
- Namaacha District

== Nampula Province ==
- Angoche District
- Eráti District
- Lalaua District
- Malema District
- Meconta District
- Mecubúri District
- Memba District
- Mogincual District
- Mogovolas District
- Moma District
- Monapo District
- Mossuril District
- Muecate District
- Murrupula District
- Nacala-a-Velha District
- Nacarôa District
- Nampula District
- Ribáuè District

== Niassa Province ==
- Cuamba District
- Lago District
- Lichinga District
- Majune District
- Mandimba District
- Marrupa District
- Maúa District
- Mavago District
- Mecanhelas District
- Mecula District
- Metarica District
- Muembe District
- N'gauma District
- Nipepe District
- Sanga District

== Sofala Province ==
- Buzi District
- Caia District
- Chemba District
- Cheringoma District
- Chibabava District
- Dondo District
- Gorongosa District
- Marromeu District
- Machanga District
- Maringué District
- Muanza District
- Nhamatanda District

== Tete Province ==
- Angónia District
- Cahora-Bassa District
- Changara District
- Chifunde District
- Chiuta District
- Doa District
- Macanga District
- Magoé District
- Marávia District
- Moatize District
- Mutarara District
- Tsangano District
- Zumbo District

== Zambezia Province ==
- Alto Molocue District
- Chinde District
- Gilé District
- Gurué District
- Ile District
- Inhassunge District
- Lugela District
- Maganja da Costa District
- Milange District
- Mocuba District
- Mopeia District
- Morrumbala District
- Namacurra District
- Namarroi District
- Nicoadala District
- Pebane District
