= Cabo Delgado Province =

Province of Mozambique

Coordinates: 12°45′S 39°30′E

Cabo Delgado Jimbo la Kabo Delgado (Swahili)
- Province
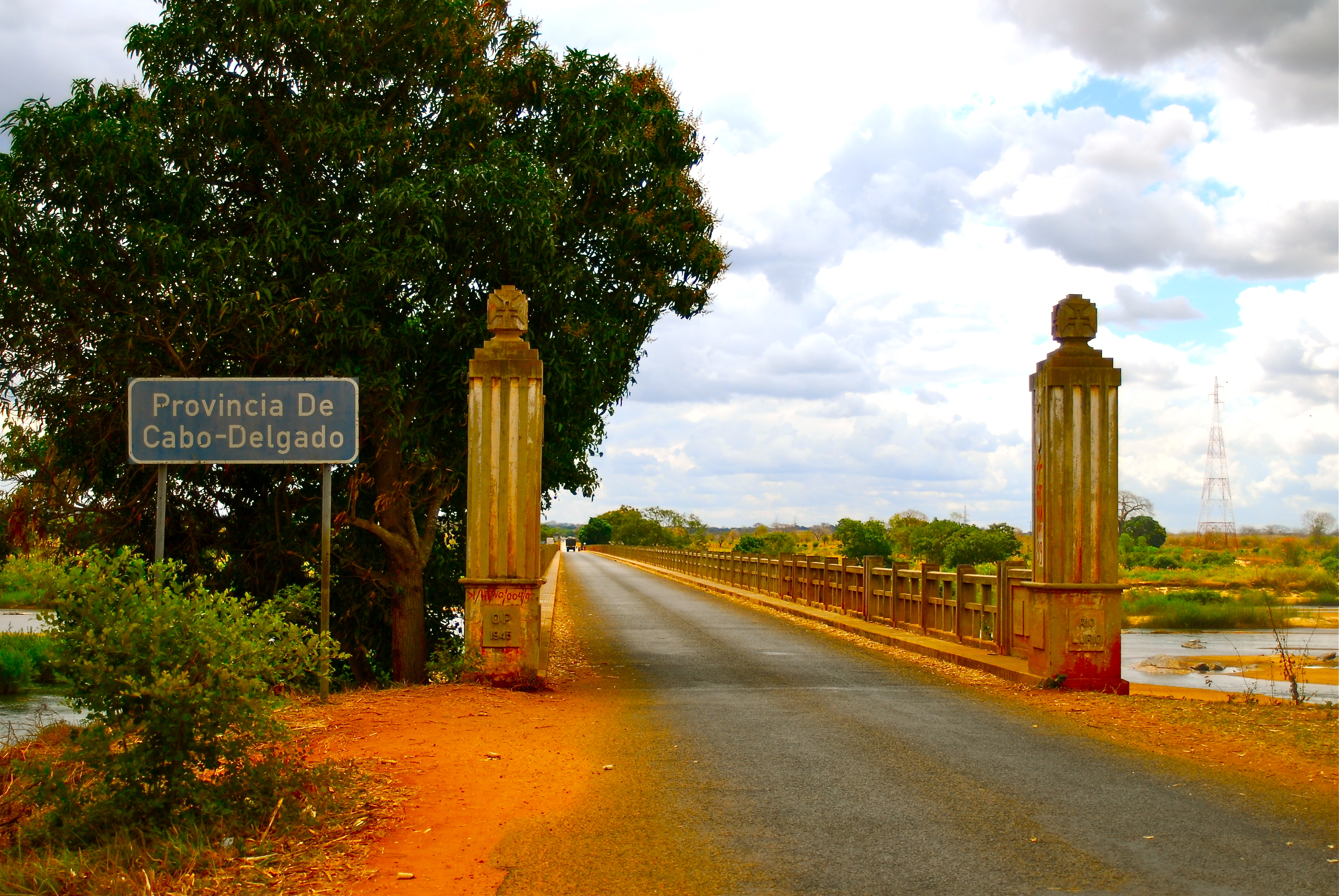

- Cabo Delgado, Province of Mozambique
- Country: Mozambique
- Capital: Pemba

Government
  - Governor: Valige Tauabo

Area
  - Total: 82,625 km^{2} (31,902 sq mi)

Population (2017)
  - Total: 2,320,261
  - Density: 28.082/km^{2} (72.732/sq mi)
- Postal code: 32xxx
- Area code: (+258) 278
- HDI (2019): 0.391 low · 11th of 11
- Official language: Portuguese
- Provincial de facto language: Swahili
- Website: www.cabodelgado.gov.mz

Cabo Delgado is the northernmost province of Mozambique. It has an area of 82,625 km^{2} (31,902 mi^{2}) and a population of 2,320,261 (2017). It borders the Mtwara Region in the neighbouring country of Tanzania, and the provinces of Nampula and Niassa.

The Province is rich in natural resources; such as natural gas, graphite, rare-earth elements, and vanadium.

The region is an ethnic stronghold of the Makonde tribe, with the Makua and Mwani as leading ethnic minorities.

== Geography ==
Cabo Delgado is the northernmost province of Mozambique. It has an area of 82,625 km^{2} (31,902 mi^{2}) and a population of 2,320,261 (2017). It borders the provinces of Nampula in the South and Niassa and borders the Mtwara Region in the neighboring country of Tanzania in the North. Cabo Delgado Province has a shoreline to the East.

The offshore Rovuma Basin was found to have large natural gas reserves at the Afungi peninsula; as of 2020 three reservoirs were being developed to produce liquefied natural gas and market gas by the Rovuma LNG project (ExxonMobil, Eni and China National Petroleum Corp.) and the Mozambique LNG (TotalEnergies)

Pemba is the capital of the province; other important cities include Montepuez and Mocímboa da Praia.

== History ==
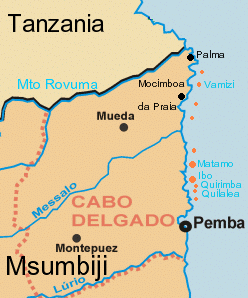
Provincial map

The province shares its name with Cape Delgado (Portuguese: Cabo Delgado), a coastal headland on the border between Mozambique and Tanzania, which forms the northernmost point in Mozambique.

On 25 September 1964, FRELIMO guerrillas arrived from Tanzania and, with help from some individuals of the surrounding population, attacked a Portuguese administrative post in the province. This raid marked the beginning of the Mozambican War of Independence, part of the Portuguese Colonial War, the former of which was an armed struggle between the Portuguese colonial authorities in the then-Portuguese Overseas Province of Mozambique and the independence movement. This province was the focus of Operation Gordian Knot, where the Portuguese forces attempted to wipe out the guerrilla bases in the province.

=== Jihadist insurgency ===
Beginning in October 2017, armed Islamist extremists linked to the Islamic State of Iraq and the Levant (ISIL) launched a jihadist insurgency in the Cabo Delgado region. The militants launched attacks and committed mass beheadings, and in August 2020 seized the port town of Mocimboa da Praia. The group sometimes refers to itself as al-Shabaab, although they do not have known links with the Somali al-Shabaab, a different jihadist group. The International Crisis Group reported in March 2021 that while ISIL has contact with the jihadists in Mozambique and has given some level of financial assistance, ISIL likely does not exert command and control authority over the group.

Mozambique Defence Armed Forces have been battling the extremists. Many civilians have been displaced by the fighting. In September 2020, ISIL insurgents captured Vamizi Island in the Indian Ocean. Over fifty people were beheaded by terrorists in the province in April 2020 and a similar number in November 2020. In March 2021, the NGO Save the Children reported that Islamist militants were beheading children, some as young as 11.

On March 24, 2021, the militants seized Palma, murdering dozens of civilians and displacing more than 35,000 of the town's 75,000 residents. Many fled to the provincial capital, Pemba. In July 2021 the Southern African Development Community deployed its military mission to the province.

As of February 2022, there were still a few civilians being killed due to the lingering insurgency and several insurgent camps were found by the Mozambican authorities.

== Demographics ==
=== Languages ===
After the 2007 Census it was found that native speakers of Makhuwa were 67%, Portuguese 6%, Makonde 3%, Mwani, a Swahili dialect, 5%, and Swahili proper 1.5%. Of unknown language were a 16%.

Religion in Cabo Delgado (2017)
1. Islam (52.5%)
2. Roman Catholicism (35.9%)
3. Protestantism (2.60%)
4. Unaffiliated (7.40%)
5. Other religions (2.60%)

Historical population
Year	Pop.	±% p.a.
1980	940,000	—
1997	1,380,202	+2.29%
2007	1,634,162	+1.70%
2017	2,320,261	+3.57%

=== Religion ===
Mozambique is a majority-Christian country; however two northern provinces have an Islamic majority – Niassa (61 percent) and Cabo Delgado (54 percent). In the north of the province, Islam has few adherents in the Mueda Plateau, a region inhabited mostly by the Makonde people; the coastal districts of the northeast, inhabited by the Mwani people are instead overwhelming Muslim. The Makhuwe are nominal Catholic or Muslim adherents, forming Muslim majorities in the central strip of the province. In Cabo Delgado, only three districts have a Catholic majority – Muidumbe (67 percent) and Mueda (54 percent) in the north and Namuno (61 percent) in the south. Two other districts have significant Catholic populations – Nangade (42 percent Catholic, 36 percent Muslim) in the north and Chiure (44 percent Muslim, 42 percent Catholic) in the South, whilst twelve have Muslim majorities, including Pemba; four are more than 90 percent Muslim. Coastal administrative posts are all over 75 percent Muslim.

== Districts ==
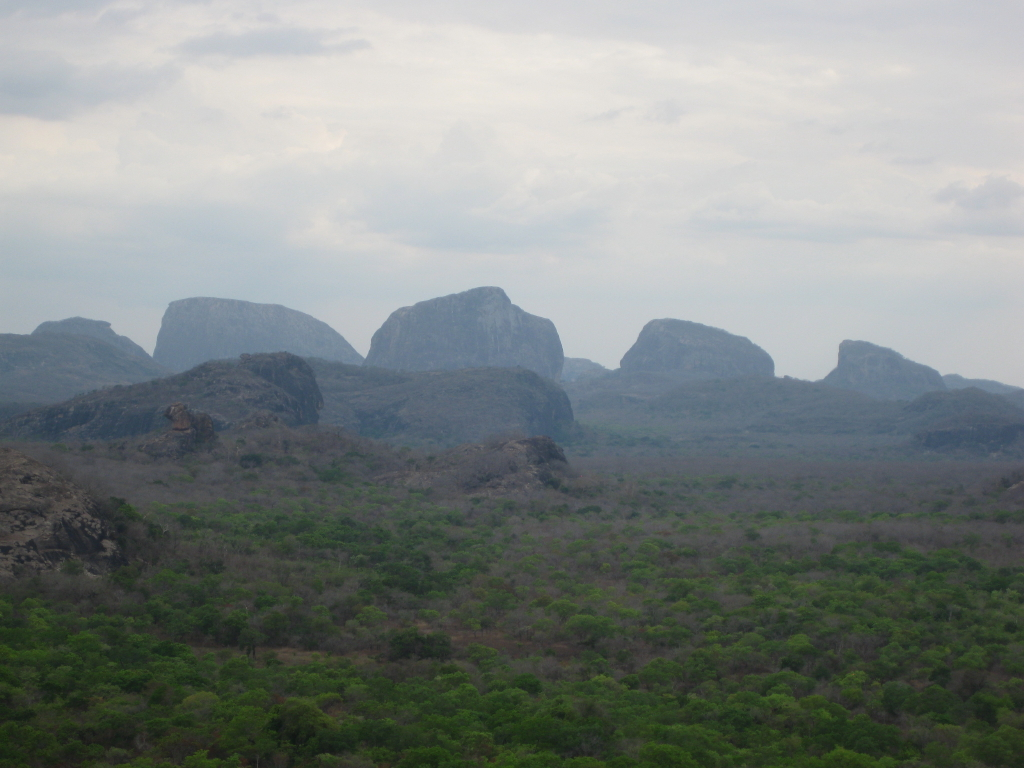
Meluco, Cabo Delgado

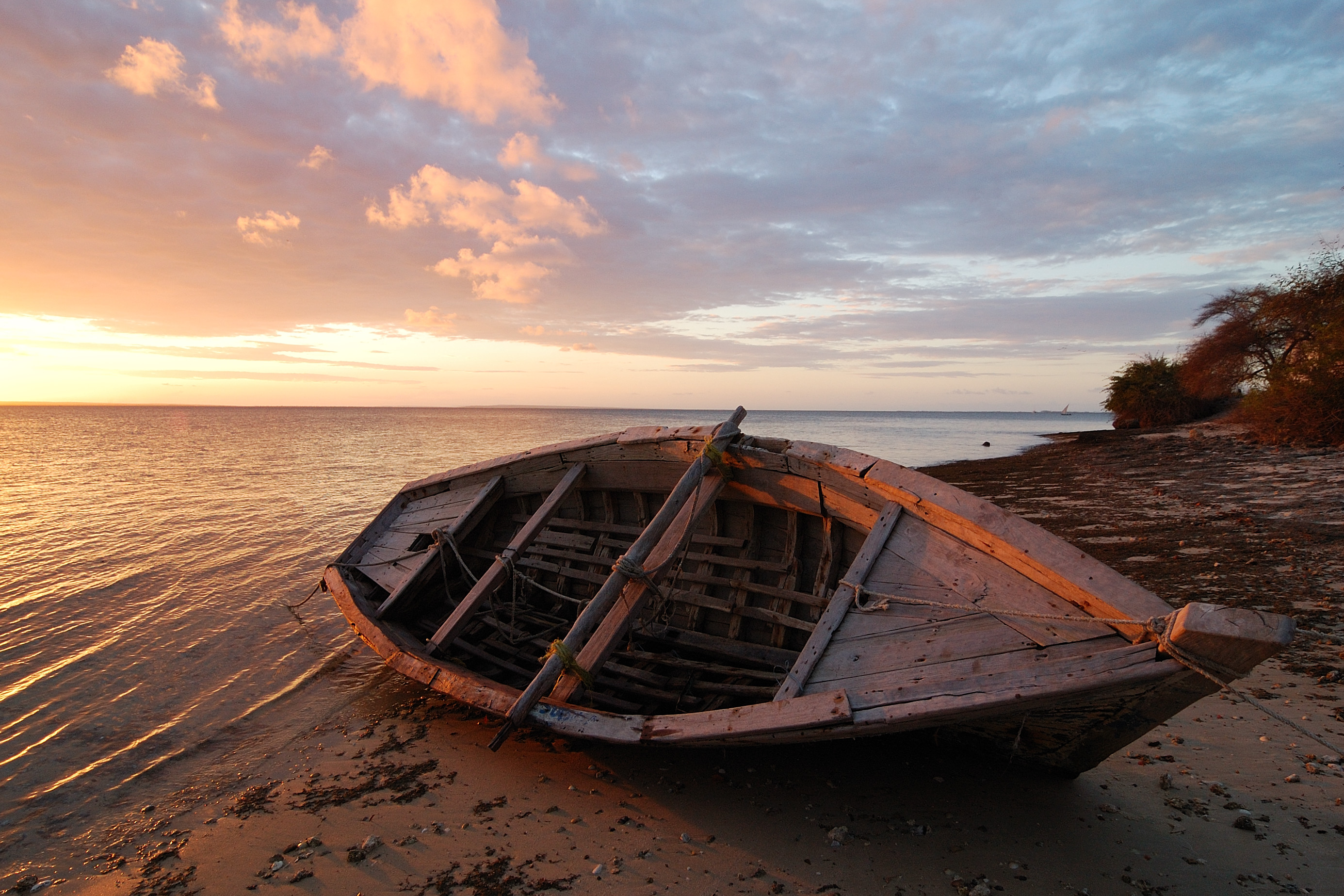
Ibo, Cabo Delgado

Cabo Delgado Province is divided into 16 districts:

- Ancuabe District – covering 4,606 km² with 109,792 inhabitants,
- Balama District – covering 5,619 km² with 126,116 inhabitants,
- Chiúre District – covering 4,210 km² with 230,044 inhabitants,
- Ibo District – covering just 48 km² with 9,509 inhabitants,
- Macomia District – covering 4,049 km² with 81,208 inhabitants,
- Mecúfi District – covering 1,192 km² with 43,573 inhabitants,
- Meluco District – covering 5,799 km² with 25,184 inhabitants,
- Metuge District – covering 1,094 km² with 65,365 inhabitants (excluding the city of Pemba),
- Mocímboa da Praia District – covering 3,548 km² with 94,197 inhabitants,
- Montepuez District – covering 15,871 km² with 185,635 inhabitants,
- Mueda District – covering 14,150 km² with 120,067 inhabitants,
- Muidumbe District – covering 1,987 km² with 73,457 inhabitants,
- Namuno District – covering 6,915 km² with 179,992 inhabitants,
- Nangade District – covering 3,031 km² with 63,739 inhabitants,
- Palma District – covering 3,493 km² with 48,423 inhabitants,
- Quissanga District – covering 2,061 km² with 35,192 inhabitants;

and the municipalities of:

- Mocimboa da Praia
- Montepuez
- Pemba – covering 194 km² with 141,316 inhabitants.

== Economy ==
The province has been economically depressed.

=== Natural gas ===
In 2010, large natural gas reserves were discovered in the offshore Rovuma Basin, 85 trillion cubic feet (Tcf) in the so called Area 4, and south of Palma, 5 Tcf in the so called Area 1 alone, the equivalent of a 12 billion barrel oil field. Area 1 has been developed by TotalEnergies.

In June 2014, the Rovuma liquefied natural gas (LNG) project environmental impact assessment was approved to exploit area 4 and the government approved the development in 2019. The 3 owners, oil companies ExxonMobil (40%), Eni (40%) and CNPC (20%), delayed a final investment decision for years due to COVID 19 pandemic related market conditions, disruption to construction workers and decreased LNG demand.

In 2021, both Exxon and TotalEnergies invoked force majeure, because the project was attacked by Jihadist militants.

On March 3, 2025, TotalEnergies suspended operations, because their financing remained unclear. Less than 2 weeks later the Trump administration promised a 4.7 billion $ loan to TotalEnergies through the US Export-Import Bank (EXIM).

=== Mining ===
The Balama mine owned by Australian Syrah Resources has been producing high grade graphite since 2019. As of 2025, resettlemet grievances of farmers were ongoing and it is unclear if the mine has "contributed to the improvement of the economy and living conditions of the residents of Cabo Delgado province or Mozambique in general".
