= Provinces of Mozambique =

Provinces of Mozambique Províncias de Moçambique (Portuguese)
- Category: Unitary state
- Location: Mozambique
- Number: 11 Provinces
- Populations: 1,446,654 (Gaza) – 6,102,867 (Nampula)
- Areas: 347 km^{2} (134 sq mi) (Maputo City) – 129,056 km^{2} (49,829 sq mi) (Niassa)
- Government: Provincial government
- Subdivisions: District

Mozambique is divided into 10 provinces (províncias) and 1 capital city (cidade) with provincial status:

Map Key	Province	Capital	Area (km^{2})	Population (2007 census)	Population (2017 census)	Density (per km^{2})	Region
2	Cabo Delgado	Pemba	86,625	1,606,568	2,333,278	26.9	North
8	Gaza	Xai-Xai	75,709	1,228,514	1,446,654	19.1	South
9	Inhambane	Inhambane	68,615	1,271,818	1,496,824	21.8	South
6	Manica	Chimoio	61,661	1,412,248	1,911,237	31.0	Central
10	Maputo City	Maputo	347	1,094,628	1,101,170	3,173.4	South
11	Maputo	Matola	26,011	1,205,709	2,507,098	96.4	South
3	Nampula	Nampula	81,606	3,985,613	6,102,867	74.8	North
1	Niassa	Lichinga	129,056	1,170,783	1,865,976	14.5	North
7	Sofala	Beira	68,018	1,642,920	2,221,803	32.7	Central
4	Tete	Tete	100,724	1,783,967	2,764,169	27.4	Central
5	Zambezia	Quelimane	105,008	3,849,455	5,110,787	48.7	North

== See also ==
- List of provinces of Mozambique by Human Development Index
- Districts of Mozambique
- ISO 3166-2:MZ
