= Portuguese conquest of Angoche =

- Part of the Campaigns of Pacification and Occupation
- The island of Angoche and surrounding territory.
Date	13 of June – 6 of August 1910
Location	Angoche, Mozambique
Result	Portuguese victory
Territorial changes	Annexation of Angoche by Portugal

Belligerents
Kingdom of Portugal	Sultanate of Angoche

Commanders and leaders
Pedro Massano de Amorim	Sultan Ibrahim (POW); Farelay (POW); Cobula-Muno (POW)

Strength
2,134 men	Unknown

Casualties and losses
At least 2 dead.	Unknown

The definitive conquest of Angoche by the Portuguese took place in 1910 and it was one of the Campaigns of Pacification and Occupation, that resulted in the formation of Mozambique.

== Context ==
The Portuguese came into contact with the modern-day territory of Mozambique when Vasco da Gama sailed to India in 1498. They settled in the region when they built the fortress of Sofala in 1505. Several more strongholds would be established in the succeeding centuries, like Mozambique Island, Quelimane, Sena, Tete, Ibo, among others.

After the independence of Brazil, Portugal sought to develop its remaining territory in Africa and pacify any powers that were hostile to Portuguese sovereignty. Among those was the Sultanate of Angoche, a small Muslim and Swahili state that served as a major commercial intermediary between the African hinterland and the outside world, but it not only persisted in the slave trade as it submitted the African kings and chiefs of the interior, or otherwise encouraged them to revolt against the Portuguese. After Sultan Mussa Quanto attacked the Maganja da Costa prazo, Portugal occupied Angoche in 1861, but withdrew its troops shortly afterwards.

One member of the royal family of Angoche, Omar bin Nacogo Farallahi, better known as Farelay, would organize attacks against the Portuguese together with Sultan Ibrahimo and their allied Macua kings, particularly king Guernea-Muno. Farelay was at the center of almost all slaver and anti-Portuguese activity. He dispatched the troops that fought against Mouzinho de Albuquerque at the Battle of Mugenga.

In 1900, Neutel de Abreu was appointed to the military command of Mogincual and he managed to impose an apparent peace in the region between Mogincual and Sancul, which allowed the Portuguese to focus on Angoche.

Upon returning from vacation in December 1909, the governor of Quelimane Pedro Massano de Amorim sought to encourage the African kings to aid Portugal in the conquest of Angoche. Captain-major Dâmaso Augusto Marques developed an intense diplomatic activity and several kings from the Mogovolas region accepted to help the Portuguese, particularly king Morla-Muno. New military posts were built at the same time, at Macogone on April 10 1910 e at Namezeze on May 25, while the Ligonha river was explored.

The plan outlined by Massano de Amorim involved neutralizing Farelay, sultan Ibrahimo, king Guernea-Muno and king Cobula-Muno.

== The campaign ==
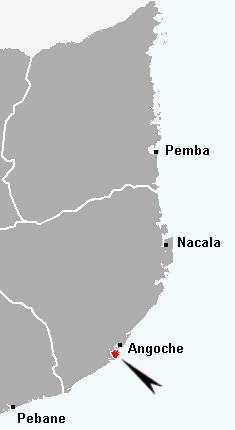
The location of Angoche, in Mozambique.

Portuguese troops numbered 2,134 men, of which 420 were regular soldiers, 714 sipaios divided in four ensacas and 1000 native African auxiliaries. They were supported by 1000 porters. These troops departed divided in two columns.

North column was commanded personally by Massano de Amorim and it departed Liúpo on June 13 1910 towards Angoche. The Portuguese however sought to spare the regulars and used the auxiliary African warriors furnished by allied kings, namely Mucapera-Muno of Corrane, under the overall command of Neutel de Abreu. They attacked the lands of Farelay through the north and 122 African lords from Mogovola, 89 of Imbamela and Meluli and 20 of Ligonha immediately acknowledged Portuguese sovereignty. On 15 June, the North Column was at Mutucuti under heavy rain and new pledges from African lords were made. On 16 and 17 of June, Neutel de Abreu led the auxiliaries in attacks against the settlements of Selege and Muianha. They fought against African warriors camouflaged among the trees, but the auxiliaries of the Portuguese carried the day as they were better equipped. Threatened with deportation to Timor, the Africans gradually surrendered as the Portuguese troops advanced and on 22 June the column was at Namazeze.

On 23 June, Cobula-Muno attacked the Portuguese column formed in a square in the middle of the forest of Cobula with 3,000 warriors, but the Macuas were repelled. He also failed to prevent the supply of water to the Portuguese. New attacks on the Portuguese were repelled by their artillery the following day. The most serious fighting took place on 26 June in Nampoto, and the fighting extended over three kilometres while the Portuguese square was violently assaulted. The Mogovolas, however, suffered heavy losses from the disciplined fire of the regular troops, and on 27 June Nampoto was occupied. New military posts were then established in Nametil, on the middle course of the Meluli River, and in Calipo. Cobula-Muno, a cruel chief, found himself abandoned by his vassals and allies, and even his mother and sister refused to grant him asylum on their lands.

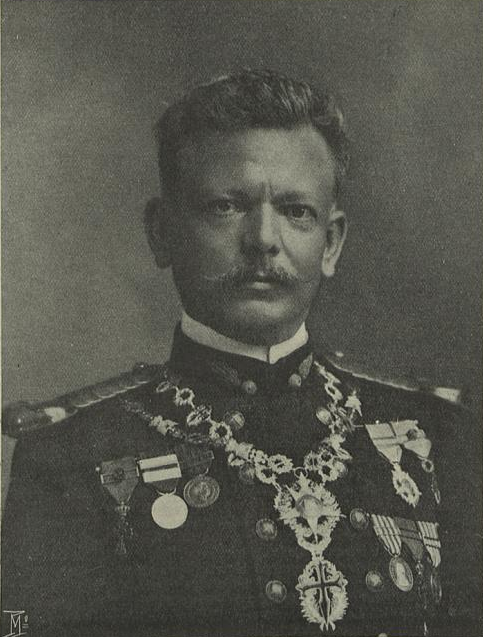
Lieutenant-Colonel Pedro Francisco Massano de Amorim.

Meanwhile, the South Column was commanded by Captain-General Dâmaso Augusto Marques, with just over 200 regulars, 1,000 auxiliaries and 600 porters. It therefore depended more on auxiliary warriors from Sangage, Parapato and Imbamela. On 21 June, a number of chiefs hostile to the Portuguese had gathered with their troops at Meluli, in the lands of sultan Ibrahimo, but they were disoriented and waiting for reinforcements from Guernea-Muno. Guernea-Muno could not spare any men while Massano de Amorim was in Mogovola, in the north. On 30 June, Augusto Marques sent his auxiliaries to attack the lands of MeLuli and Larde. On 4 July, he attacked the lands of sultan Ibrahimo in Aube and on 7 July those of Guernea-Muno. 800 auxiliaries were attacked by the warriors of Ibrahimo, Guernea-Muno and Muhogo, an Imbamela king, but they were repelled. On 15 and 16 July, three officers, four European soldiers, 100 African soldiers and 600 auxiliaries who had left Macogone were fiercely attacked by the warriors of Guernea-Muno and Muhogo, but these were repelled once more.

Raids and counter-raids turned to fierce fighting on 18 July but the Portuguese prevailed with the help of king Morla-Muno. By then, most of the hostile Macua kings were already willing to submit to the Portuguese, while Farelay, Ibrahimo and Guernea-Muno had taken refuge in Matadane. On 28 or 29 July, Guernea-Muno surrendered to Captain-General Dâmaso Augusto Marques. Two days later, the Guerneia post was founded in Imbamela, with 78 soldiers. Established in the heart of the Macua resistance, the Portuguese had dominated the region. On 1 August, the Portuguese captured Sultan Ibrahimo with the help of Etite-muno, who knew the sultan's hiding place.

After the establishment of the Guerneia post, on 6 August Governor Massano de Amorim received 87 chiefs in Parapato to sign the capitulation in front of 6,000 warriors.

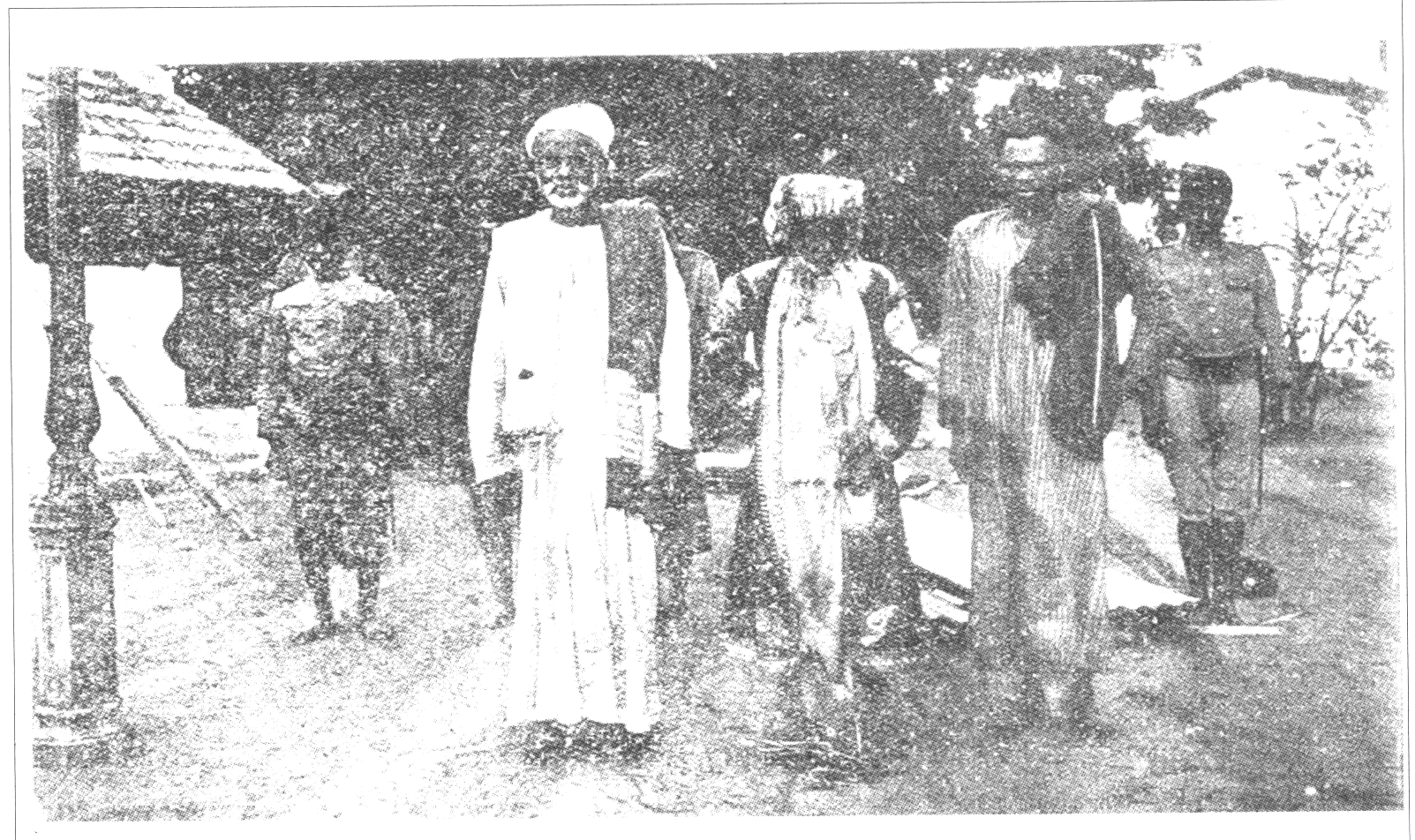
Sultan Ibrahim, Farelay and Cobula-Muno.

Farelay was captured at Moma in mid-August by king Mamuia and handed over to the Portuguese. He was deported to Guinea-Bissau, where he would later die. Seventeen posts were established in Angoche and the region was occupied. During the campaign, Massano de Amorim's troops had travelled 450 kilometres, fought eight battles and set up seven military posts in the hinterland, four in Magovola (at Calipo, Nametil, Cobula, Maezeze) and three in Imbamela (Namaponda, Macogone and Guernea). The Portuguese suffered the loss of one European soldier and one African soldier, with most of the attacks being fought by allied auxiliaries.

Following the capture of Angoche, the city's name was changed to ‘António Enes’.

== See also ==
- Portuguese Mozambique
- Scramble for Africa
- Portuguese conquest of the Gaza Empire
- Portuguese conquest of Barue
- Maputo campaign
- Arab slave trade
- Indian Ocean slave trade
- Angoche-Portuguese conflicts
