= Malema (disambiguation) =

Malema most often refers to Julius Malema, a South African politician.

It may also refer to:

== People ==
- Paul Malema, South African politician
- Thabo Malema (born 1985), South African actor

== Places ==
- Malema, Mozambique, a small town in northern Mozambique
- Malema District, Mozambique
- Malema Chiefdom, Sierra Leone

== See also ==
- Communist Party of Nepal (Malema)
- Melema (disambiguation)
