= Angoche–Portuguese conflicts (1847–1910) =

Military conflict

- Part of Campaigns of Pacification and Occupation
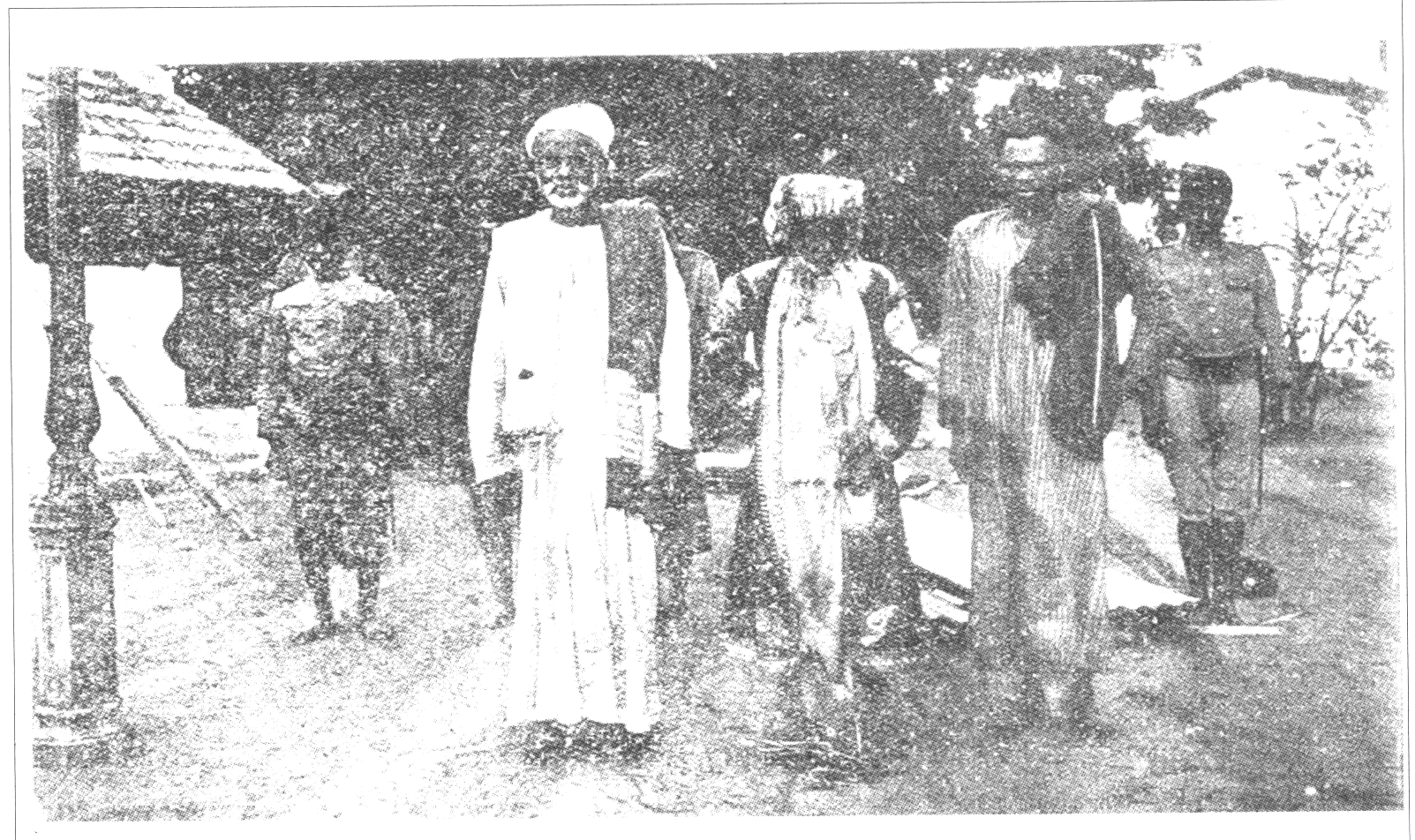
- Sultan Ibrahim, Farelay, and Cubula-mwene
Date	July 1847–1910
Location	Mozambique
Result	Portuguese victory
Territorial changes	Portuguese conquest of the Angoche Sultanate

Belligerents
1847–1850: Portuguese Empire; United Kingdom; 1855–1861: Portuguese Empire; Maganja da Costa; Licungo; and other prazos…; 1861–1877: Portuguese Empire; Imbamella (from 1864)	1847–1861: Angoche Sultanate; 1861–1877: Angoche Sultanate; 130 chiefs; Sangage Sheikhdom; Makua factions; Imbamella (until 1864)

Commanders and leaders
Domingos Fortunato de Vale (1847–1850); Joao Bonifacio † (1855–1861); Victorino Romao (1861); Morla Muno (chief of the Imbamella)	Ahmadi ibn Sulayman (1847–1850); Hassani Jussuf (AWOL) (1855–1861); Mussa Quanto (WIA) (1861–1877); Morla Muno (chief of the Imbamella)

Strength
1861: 3,000 Zambezi irregulars 19 Portuguese soldiers 1861–1877: Unknown	1861: 6,000; 1864–1877: 30,000

The Angoche–Portuguese conflicts were a series of wars between the Angoche Sultanate and the Portuguese Empire between 1847 and 1910.

== Background ==
Since the mid-16th century, the Angoche Sultanate had been in decline after being replaced by Quelimane as a major port. The Sultanate was hurt by the settlement of a new group of people on its hinterland, who blocked access to the mainland and imposed tolls on passing caravans. During this period Angoche suffered from an economic decline, with the Sultans losing their political influence.

In the 1830s Angoche quickly supplied a growing demand for ivory, rubber and slaves. The latter became increasingly important throughout the century, as the European anti-slavery movement grew. The independence of the Sultanate from European Empires made it a focus for the slave trade. By 1847, many businesses had relocated to Angoche from cities under Portuguese control such as Mozambique Island, to escape the taxes and slave laws there.

== Anti-slavery patrols ==
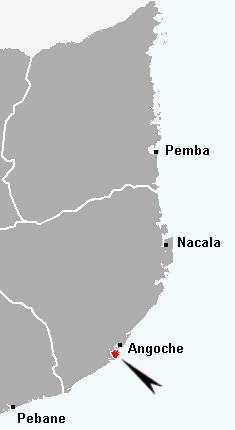
Angoche was located on Angoche Island, not the modern day city of Angoche

In 1846 the barque Lucy Penniman of New York and Brazilian brig Kentucky arrived in Angoche. The Lucy Penniman was freighted in the southern US and carried cargo for several southern slavers who were expected in East African waters. In May they were caught by the HMS Cleopatra, who had been given general permission to enter secondary ports on the Mozambique coast in search of slavers. Four of the ship's boats boarded the Lucy Penniman and another boarded the Kentucky, burning them down.

This vigorous action caused the Portuguese to ban British cruisers from entering their ports as they feared that if the British were allowed to act as they did on the west coast on the east, they would soon be making treaties with coastal chiefs without reference to Portugal. In July 1847 Portugal sent the Villa Flor to Angoche to force the sultan to ban slavery. The sultan was anxious but agreed to ban slavery within his territories.

However, the sultan was "not master in his own house." When the word got out that a Portuguese ship entered Angoche, thousands of people including slavers, soldiers, and tribesmen, flocked to the town and attacked the Portuguese party, killing three. The rest were only saved when the sultan put them inside his jail.

Four months later British anti-slave patrols reported that slavers were still in Angoche. While the British were hesitant to support the expansion of the Portuguese Empire, suppressing the slave trade was more important. In November 1847 a joint Anglo-Portuguese force sailed for Angoche with a draft treaty. The sultan requested a delay in signing the treaty which he used to pour men into Angoche to defend it. On 23 November, armed boats from the President and the Euridye attacked Angoche and suppressed it after a day-long battle. The sultan surrendered and agreed to recognize the sovereignty of Portugal. He also agreed to end the slave trade and ban all ships without Mozambique papers.

However, no Portuguese resident was appointed and no garrison was installed. Slavery continued for the next three years in Angoche. In November 1849 the HMS Dee discovered a two-mastered brig waiting to load slaves in Angoche. The Dee sunk the ship and exchanged fire with the town.

In early 1850 Sultan Amadi died and was succeeded by Hassani Jussuf, who seized the throne from a member of the M'bilinzi clan. Hassani, with help from the Sultan of Johanna, made peace with the British and Portuguese. Once again, Portugal made no attempt at occupying the port.

== War with the Alves da Silva family ==
=== Conquest ===
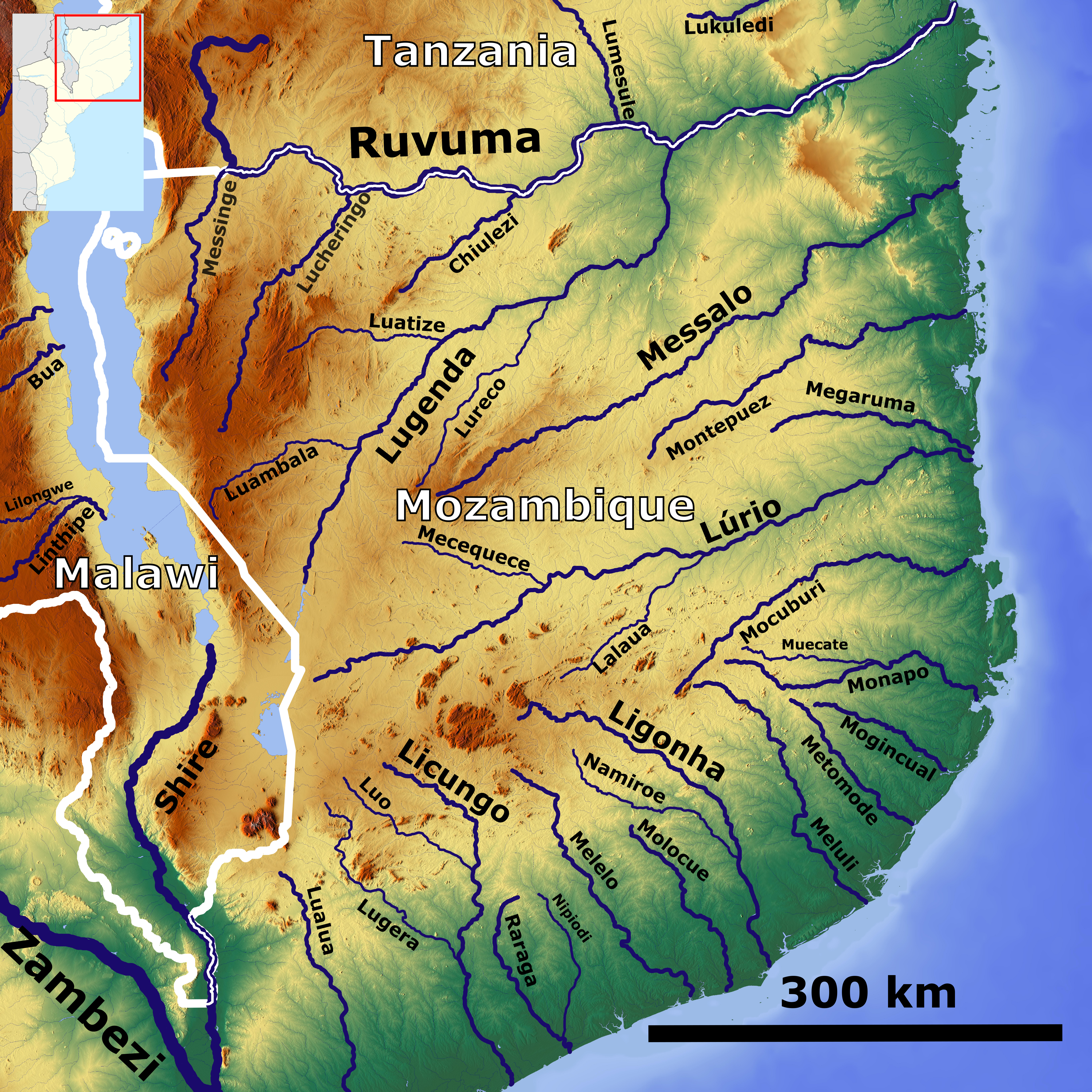
Rivers of northern Mozambique

The half-brother of the sultan, Musa Muhammad Sahib the fearsome, later referred to by Portuguese writers as the "Napoleon" of East Africa, would embark on a path of ambitious expansionist policies toward the hinterland. He went by his father's nickname, "Mussa Quanto," and was a member of the Anhapakho clan, with familial ties along the Mozambique coast. During his teens, he learned and travelled extensively with his uncle, who served as the official interpreter to the Portuguese government. Their journeys took them to various places, including Zanzibar, Madagascar, the Comoros Islands, and allegedly as far as Lake Nyasa and the Zambezi valley in the interior. These travels facilitated Musa's connections with the Muslim world of the Indian Ocean region and convinced him of the potential for Angoche's expansion into the interior.

By the 1850s, he had settled in Angoche and was placed in command of its armed forces. With the help of the widespread circulation of modern firearms, Musa launched a war against the Marrevoni Lomwe group of the Makwa, whom he subsequently defeated and enslaved, bringing more ivory and rubber with his conquest. The Macua of the region were brought to recognise the overrule of Angoche.

Angoche's rapid expansion brought it into conflict with the Alves da Silva family of the prazos of Maganja da Costa. Its founder, António Alves da Silva, came from the province of Beira in Portugal in the early 19th century and established a trade in ivory and slaves. The family lands extended from the Quizonga River in the north, Licungo River in the south, and up to the confluence of the rivers Luo and Lugela in the west in the interior, and was militarily powerful and agriculturally rich, with big annual fairs that became a popular destination for the caravan routes from the interior. The ports under the da Silva family's control, especially Quizungo, which like Angoche were beyond European control, became one of the major rival ports for Angoche. It was these lands that became the next target of Musa's conquest.

The pretext for the war was grievances raised by Nampana-mwene, an Anhapakho kin of Musa, who claimed that his territory on the mainland of Pebane had been ravaged by Maganja da Costa warriors. According to tradition, it is said that his half-brother was reluctant to allow him to lead a major expedition into the interior. Nonetheless, in early 1855, the army set out and forged a path of conquest that extended as far as the Shire River. There they were beaten by the fortified stockade of one of the prazo senhors and were forced to turn back home, laying waste to the prazos near Quelimae. In particular, his army divested the prazo of Licungo, owned by the Alves da Silva brothers. Overall, the military operation was a success and Angoche annexed some areas of the prazo, enslaving its people.

=== Invasion by João Bonifácio ===
In 1856, Portugal sent another naval expedition to Angoche but it was a failure. Instead, Portugal decided to make use of Zambezi irregulars of Joao Bonifacio, one of the two da Silva brothers. Joao Bonifacio organized and built up his army with great care. He recruited black soldiers throughout Zambezia and formed 12 regiments (known as ensacas), each comprising 250 men, complete with their own chain of command and stationed in stockades within his prazo. Eight of these regiments were designated for service in Angoche and received armament support from Portugal, which also dispatched an officer and 18 men to add an official character to the expedition. This combined force, equipped with two field guns, entered Angoche territory in August 1861.

When the news of his invasion reached Angoche, massive upheaval took place among the inhabaco. The timid Sultan Hassani abdicated, packed all his wives, slaves and belongings into five dhows, and fled to Madagascar. Musa was then proclaimed sultan and was determined to defend Angoche.

On 26 September 1861, the Zambezi army clashed with the 6,000-sized defending force on the shallows that separated Angoche Island from the mainland. While Bonifacio was killed in the fighting, the Zambezi force overran Angoche's defences, attacked the town, and destroyed it. However, the Zambezi had no interest in occupying Angoche and so handed it over to Portugal.

Musa was able to flee from Angoche and crossed into the mainland where he attempted to rally chiefs against Portuguese rule. The other da Silva brother, Victorino Romao da Silva, sent troops after him who clashed with Musa on several occasions, wounding him in one of the battles. Musa fled to the Sancul Sheikhdom where he was betrayed and placed inside a dungeon at Fort São Sebastião.

== Reconquest ==
In early 1862, Musa escaped from his prison and fled to Madagascar where he acquired ships, guns, and powder.

== Cited works ==
- Newitt, Malyn (1972). "Angoche, the Slave Trade and the Portuguese c. 1844–1910". The Journal of African History. 13 (4): 659–672. doi:10.1017/S0021853700011993. JSTOR 180760. S2CID 162460523.
- Isendahl, Christian. "Angoche: An important link of the Zambezian gold trade" (PDF). Uppsala University.
- Bonate, Liazzat (2007). Traditions and transitions : Islam and chiefship in Northern Mozambique, ca. 1850–1974 (PDF) (PhD thesis).
- Bonate, Liazzat (2003). "The Ascendance of Angoche". Christian Michelsen Institute.
