= Angoche =

District of Nampula Province, Mozambique

Angoche Parapatho
- City and municipality
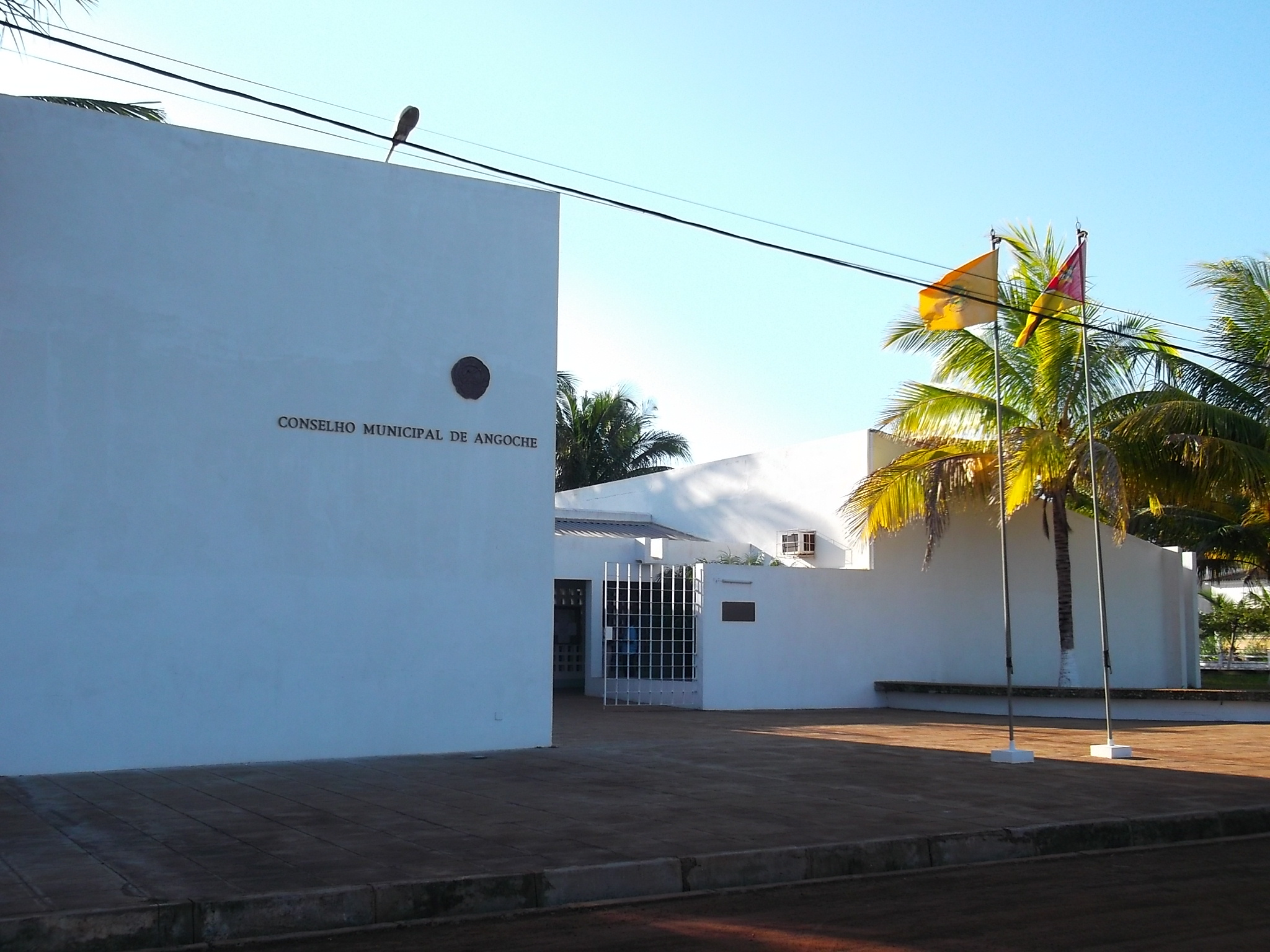

- Location in Mozambique
- Coordinates: 15°52′09″S 39°55′00″E
- Country: Mozambique
- Province: Nampula
- District: Angoche

Government
  - Body: District Administration

Area
  - Total: 3,056 km^{2} (1,180 sq mi)
- Elevation: 12 m (39 ft)

Population (2017)
  - Total: 103,769
  - Density: 101.8/km^{2} (264/sq mi)

Ethnic Groups
  - Makhuwa: 40%
  - Koti: 60%

Languages
  - EMakhuwa: 40%
  - Koti: 60%
- Time zone: UTC+2 (Central Africa Time)

Angoche is a district, city and municipality located in Nampula Province in north-eastern Mozambique. The district has limits in the North with Mogincual District, in the South with Larde District, to the east with the Indian Ocean and to the west with Mogovolas District. The principal town is Angoche (known as António Enes in the colonial period). It is located 185 km from the provincial capital, Nampula City.

== History ==
=== Arab explorers ===
Before the arrival of Vasco de Gama in 1498, and according to local oral tradition, the Archipelago of Angoche, made up of several islands, was inhabited by a community that was part of the Swahili, on the East African coast. The dominant groups in the region, the Anhapakhos, were members of the Shiraz family, which allegedly reached the islands of Angoche and Quiloa Island (in present-day Tanzania) whose sultans were also Shirazis, originating from the port of Shiraz, located on the Persian side of the Persian Gulf. One of the founders of the reigning family of the Sultanate of Angoche was Hasani, who died at sea and was buried on the island that was later named after him, Kisiwa Sultani Hasani (known as Ilha de Mafamede by the Portuguese). According to Duarte Barbosa, who wrote in 1508, the habits, customs and language of the inhabitants of the islands of Angoche were similar to those of the Ilha de Moçambique.

At the time of the arrival of the first islamic explorers, whom the Portuguese called “Moors”, the Marundos peoples, descendants of the Amacúas, already inhabited the lands of Angoche. According to oral accounts, this people had already been constituted before the first Bantu incursion. The story goes that two important men with the names Mussa and Hassan, accompanied by their relatives and slaves, left Zanzibar following religious differences and headed for and settled in Ilha de Moçambique. One day, Hassan, intending to reach the mainland of Mozambique, in the Angoche Bay region, was surprised by a strong storm, ending up losing his life when he fell into the sea. Hassan was buried in the nearest place which was the Mafamede island. Notifying Mussa of Hassan's death, he went to the site to see Hassan's tomb, having boarded the village of Mialule, now Melule. Arrived at Mafamede where Hassan had been buried and, having Mussa liked the place, there he left his son Xosa who chose Muchelele, a place close to Hassan's tomb, to establish his residence and where he started to govern with the title of Sultan. (See Angoche Sultanate for more information.) They are some of Xosa's children who give rise to the population of Catamoio which, in turn, gives rise to the Village of Angoche.

=== Portuguese Colonial and Occupation Resistance ===
In 1863, the land was conquered from the Portuguese by Sultan Mussa, supported by slave traders. Until the mid-19th century, the Portuguese were unable to control or settle on the islands or mainland of Angoche. The situation changed when one of the members of the royal family of the Angoche Islands, Mussa Mohammad Sahib Quanto (d. 1879), decided to attack the deadlines of Macanja da Costa, belonging to the Silva brothers, because of the dispute over the control of the roads of flow of slaves from the interior to the coast.

The Portuguese went to support the da Silvas and a small military detachment of about twenty elements came to occupy the island in 1861, together with João Bonifácio da Silva, one of the Silva brothers. The pleasure people, after taking revenge on the Anhapakhos, had no interest in settling on the islands and returned to their land. Consequently, Mussa Quanto recovered the island, where he was installed as sultan and the few Portuguese present were expelled. From the beginning of the "effective occupation" of Africa, which had a decisive start in 1895, the islands of Angoche suffered repeated assaults by the Portuguese. Then the other member of the Angoche royal family, Omar bin Nacogo Farallahi (known as Farelay by the Portuguese), along with Sultan Ibrahim and his allies, the mainland Macuas, led the resistance that lasted until 1910, when Massano de Amorim and other Portuguese officers managed to conquer the region militarily.

After taking the island in 1861, the Portuguese created the modern settlement (decree dated 05.07.1865), whose charter was approved in the mid-twentieth century (Ordinance No. 11.585 of 04.08.1956, when the town was supplied with water). The evolution of the administrative process of Angoche then went through the following stages throughout the 19th century: seat of circumscription on July 30, 1921, and county seat on October 31, 1934; it elevated the village on December 19, 1934 and the city on September 26, 1970. Although the Portuguese continued to administer the region from one of the islands of Angoche (Quiloa), there was already a small Portuguese population in Parapato, in part mainland.

From the beginning of the 1930s, at the time of the Estado Novo, the mainland Angoche region became one of the centers of cashew and rice production, in addition to traditional fishing, which already existed on the coast. The Portuguese identified the Puli area, where the Africans lived, as the best continental part of Parapato. Consequently, the Africans were resettled in the Bairro de Inguri, created at this time, and in Puli the European masonry village called + was built. The urban evolution can be followed through the municipal edition Planta da Vila de António Enes (esc. 1/5,000), dated 1958, in which the elementary grid that makes up the town on the coast is drawn. The 20th century urbanization plans or studies date from 1924, 1932 and 1965 (the latter being authored by the architect Bernardino Ramalhete and revised by Hidrotécnica Portuguesa in 1972). In 1968 and 1972, the colonial government, concerned about the spread of liberation movements in northern Mozambique, carried out several measures aimed at winning Muslims to its side, although many of them were also related to the policies of decentralization of the Portuguese government from 1971, which allowed the channeling of new funds to the colonies. This resulted in an improvement in the quality of life of the African population, including basic sanitation and the construction of masonry neighborhoods for Africans, including the Bairro de Inguri, in the city of Angoche. At the same time, the Portuguese government restored some important historic mosques and built new ones, such as the Mosque of Catamoio, on one of the islands of Angoche, inaugurated by General Kaúlza de Arriaga in 1971. Monuments and Statues The Monument to António is highlighted Enes, simple bust on a pedestal, in front of the City Hall (built before 1954). It was built as a "homage to the population of the county", as one could read in the inscription on its base, which consists of a prismatic stone volume with two buttresses, also in stone, on each side.

Angoche was one of the most important socio-economic centers in the region. With the proclamation of National Independence, in February 1976, the city of António Enes was renamed Angoche. In 1997 the city is elevated to the category of City Municipality, under Law 10/97 of 31 May.

== Geography ==
=== Neighboring Districts ===
Angoche District is limited by:

- Mogincual District to the north
- The Indian Ocean to the east
- Mogovolas District to the west
- Larde District to the south

=== Climate and Geomorphology ===
The south eastern Nampula towards the northern coastal region of Zambézia, including the coastal districts of Angoche, Larde, Moma and Pebane, the average annual rainfall returns to values between 800 and 1,000 mm, although the potential evapotranspiration is higher than the 1,500 mm. The temperature is generally above 20 °C.

Climate data for Angoche
Month	Jan	Feb	Mar	Apr	May	Jun	Jul	Aug	Sep	Oct	Nov	Dec	Year
Mean daily maximum °F (°C)	86 (30)	86 (30)	84 (29)	82 (28)	81 (27)	79 (26)	79 (26)	81 (27)	86 (30)	90 (32)	90 (32)	90 (32)	84 (29)
Mean daily minimum °F (°C)	75 (24)	73 (23)	72 (22)	72 (22)	68 (20)	66 (19)	64 (18)	66 (19)	68 (20)	70 (21)	73 (23)	75 (24)	70 (21)
Average precipitation inches (mm)	5.1 (130)	4.5 (114)	3.4 (86)	1.5 (38)	0.7 (17)	0.6 (15)	0.6 (14)	0.5 (12)	0.2 (5)	0.2 (6)	0.7 (17)	2.4 (60)	20.2 (514)
Source: Meteoblue

The coastal plains in the region are dissected by some rivers that ascend from the coast to the interior, gradually passing to a more dissected relief with more steep slopes in between, from the transitional subplateau zone to the coastal zone. This zone corresponds to the coastal area of the province. It is characterized by its sandy soils, washed to moderately washed, predominantly yellow to greyish-brown, whether in the inland sandy cover (Ferralic Arenosols) or in the coastal sandy dunes (Haplic Arenosols), and also by the soils of the strip of coastal sandstone, from sandy to loam sandy clay loam with orange color (Ferralic Arenosols). The hydromorphic sandy soils of depressions and lows alternate with the higher ground parts (Gleyic Arenosols).

== Demographics ==
The following statistics are from the 2017 census.

=== Population and Density ===
In the 2017 census the population has increased to 341,176 with the rise of density to 101.8 inhabitants per km².

In 2007, the Census indicated total population of 276 471 residents. The population density was around 92.59 inhabitants per km². According to the 1997 Census, the district had 228,526 inhabitants, resulting in a population density of 76.5 inhabitants per km².

=== Gender ===
Gender	Population	%
Female	168,452	51.50%
Male	178,724	48.50%

== Administrative and political units ==
=== Subdivisions ===
The Angoche district is divided into four administrative posts: Angoche, Aube, Boila-Nametoria and Namaponda. These posts are, in turn, composed of the following localities.

Administrative Post	Localities
Angoche-Sede	Angoche
Aúbe	Aube Catamoio
Boila-Namitoria	Boila Nabruma Malapa
Namaponda	Namaponda

=== Political leadership / Government ===
The district government is represented by an Administrator, which is the highest local government rank. Since 1975, 9 District Administrators have been appointed by different Mozambique Presidents:

- (2021 - ) Bernardo Alide
- (2015 - 2021) Rodrigo Artur Ussene
- (2009 - 2016) Fonseca Etide
- (2005 - 2009) José Carlos Amade

== Economy ==
=== Agriculture, Livestock and Fishery ===
Agriculture is one of the most dominant activity in Angoche and involves almost all households. In general, agriculture is practiced manually on a small scale farms or family farms.

The farm plantation mechanism is based on the intercropping of local crops. Agricultural production is predominantly done under rainfed conditions, not always successful, as the risk of crop loss is high, given the low moisture storage capacity in the soil during the growing period of the crops. There are also small irrigation infrastructures with the capacity to carry out surface irrigation and dams with the potential to irrigate small agricultural areas. The coastal strip is dominated by the production system based on the cultivation of cassava, intercropped with grain legumes such as cowpea and peanut. Upland rice is the crop produced in the alluvial plains of the main rivers that drain the coast and estuarine plains, and is normally produced in floodplains prepared for this purpose.

It is also worth mentioning the importance of coconut and cashew trees in the coastal zone's production system, either as a product that guarantees food security or as a source of income for rural families. The cashew agroforestry system is the most representative, even becoming dominant. The most important intercropping of cashew, comprises crops such as cassava and corn, following the traditional pattern of rotation and fallow in the medium and long term, depending heavily on the age of the cashew trees and their productivity. A peculiarity of the area is that practically all the cassava is within the cashew tree area. The coconut palm in the province has a wide distribution towards the interior. It was only in 2003, after the period of drought and drought that followed and the rehabilitation of some infrastructures, that farming in the district was timidly restarted and production levels recovered. Livestock promotion in the district has been weak. However, given the tradition in raising cattle and some existing infrastructure, there was some growth in the livestock population.

Due to limited investing and financing mechanism the livestock is not well developed, although the existence of pasture areas. Lack of extension services is also one of the main obstacles to its development.

Mangrove trees are used for firewood and building material. The district is struggling with erosion problems. Wildlife is an important food supplement for local families. Among the most hunted species are rabbits, gazelles and guinea fowl. In addition to the species already mentioned, the wildlife in the district also includes antelopes and monkeys.

Fishing in the district is more focused on shrimp, to the detriment of other species and valuable resources consisting of lobster, squid, octopus and crab. There are two fishing companies in the district, Pesca Norte and Mawipi Pescas.

=== Commerce. Industries And Tourism ===
The Angoche district already had a very important agro-industry activity. Today, of the 12 companies in the district's industrial park, only 3 are operational. The small local industry (fishing, carpentry and handicraft) appears as an alternative to agricultural activity, or extension of its activity. The district has a total of 22 small industries. The district has access to an extensive network of markets, due to its road links with Nampula and the Nacala corridor, and the existence of the port in Angoche. Traders from Nampula, Cabo Delgado and Tanzania come to the district to buy local products. The district has excellent areas for tourism, including the following: Praia Nova, 7 km from the city of Angoche; Monte Parapato, Praia da Rocha, Quelelene Island, Mafamede Island, among others. Other local attractions to mention are the Municipal Cemetery, Campo do Sultão Hassane Yossufo, the Cadeia Civil Building, the Sangaje lighthouse and the Luís de Gonzaga Church in Malatane.

=== Mineral Resources ===
Like other districts in the country, Angoche has enormous potential in different types of mineral resources, among others. Since colonial times, Angoche has been the target of prospecting, research and geological mapping programs in order to identify its potential.

According to the geological studies, Angoche has huge quantities of heavy (Zircon, Ilmenite, Rutile, titanium) minerals deposits along of its coastal plain. This mineral are currently been explored by a consortium of companies from China, Ireland and the United States. And as per mining catalogue (2021), except 1 for the limestone exploration license, most of them (16) are designated for heavy mineral exploration. Although there are many companies in exploration and licensing phase, its importante to mention one of the key players exploring and producing the heavy sands in Angoche district are Kenmare Resources (An Irish-American Enterprise), África Great Wall Mining Development Co(Chinese), a subsidiary of Hainan Haiyu Mining Co. Ltd.

=== Oil and Gas ===
Following the public tender launched by INP in October 2014, for the concession of areas for exploration and production of hydrocarbons, 2 offshore blocks was awarded in October 2018 to multinational oil companies. Area A5-A awarded to a consortium led by Eni 34.5%(Italy), in partnership with, Sasol 25.5%(South Africa), QatarEnergy 25.5% (Qatar) and National Oil Company ENH 15% (Mozambique); while the deeper Area A5-B was awarded to ExxonMobil 40% (USA), Roseneft 20%(Russia), QatarEnergy 10% (Qatar), Eni 10% (Italy), and National Oil Company ENH 20% (Mozambique). Along the 8 years of exploration period, the companies are obliged to implement exploration programs with consists of shooting 3D seismic surveys of 8,000 km^{2} from each area and undertake at least 1 exploration drilling activities in each area before any surrender and abandonment. According to local authorities, the preliminary studies indicate that the offshore Angoche is an oil-pron province, for this reason the local communities, provincial and central government is very positive about the project.

In 2019, both Eni and ExxonMobil along with environmental consulting companies have visited the districts and neighboring regions in order to fulfil all the requirements for environmental permit for drilling activities to take place in Q1 2022.

=== Sustainability ===
Firewood and charcoal are the most used energy sources.
