= Fort São José de Mossuril =

- Fortaleza de São José de Mossuril
- Mossuril, Nampula in Mozambique

Site information
- Controlled by: Portuguese Empire

Location
- Coordinates: 14°57′53″S 40°39′38.8″E

Fort São José de Mossuril (Fortaleza de São José de Mossuril in Portuguese), also spelled Forte de São José de Mussuril, or Mossuril Fort for short (Forte de Mossuril in Portuguese) was a Portuguese military structure once located in the village of Mossuril, in the district of Mossuril, Nampula Province, on the coast of Mozambique.

== History ==
The fort had been built over a langoa, name which designated a flat floodplain. It was rebuilt in 1718 by captain-general Cavalcanti and in 1758 by order of captain-general Pedro de Saldanha Albuquerque. In 1834, its garrison consisted of a company of caçadores ("hunters") light infantry.

In the early nineteenth century, a map was produced of the fort. In the years close to 1834, São José de Mossuril constituted on the twelve parishes of Mozambique, with an estimated Catholic populated of 3541 persons.

In 1840 its commander was Major José Antonio Pereira.

This fortification was repaired in 1963.

Its defense was complemented by the Matibane Redoubt.
