= Al-Shibr =

- Location in Yemen
- Coordinates: 13°53′58.77″N 45°14′9.72″E
- Country: Yemen
- Governorate: Lahij Governorate
- District: Yafa'a District
- Time zone: UTC+3 (Yemen Standard Time)

Al-Shibr is a village in Yemen, located in the region known as Upper Yafa (Arabic: يافع العليا Yāfiʿ al-ʿUlyā). Prior to the revolt of 1963 this region was a sultanate that consisted of five sheikdoms. Al-Shibr was the capital of the Hadrami Sheikhdom and its Sheikh had his headquartered there.
