= Angoche Sultanate =

Sultanate

Coordinates: 16°14′S 39°55′E

- c. 1485–1910
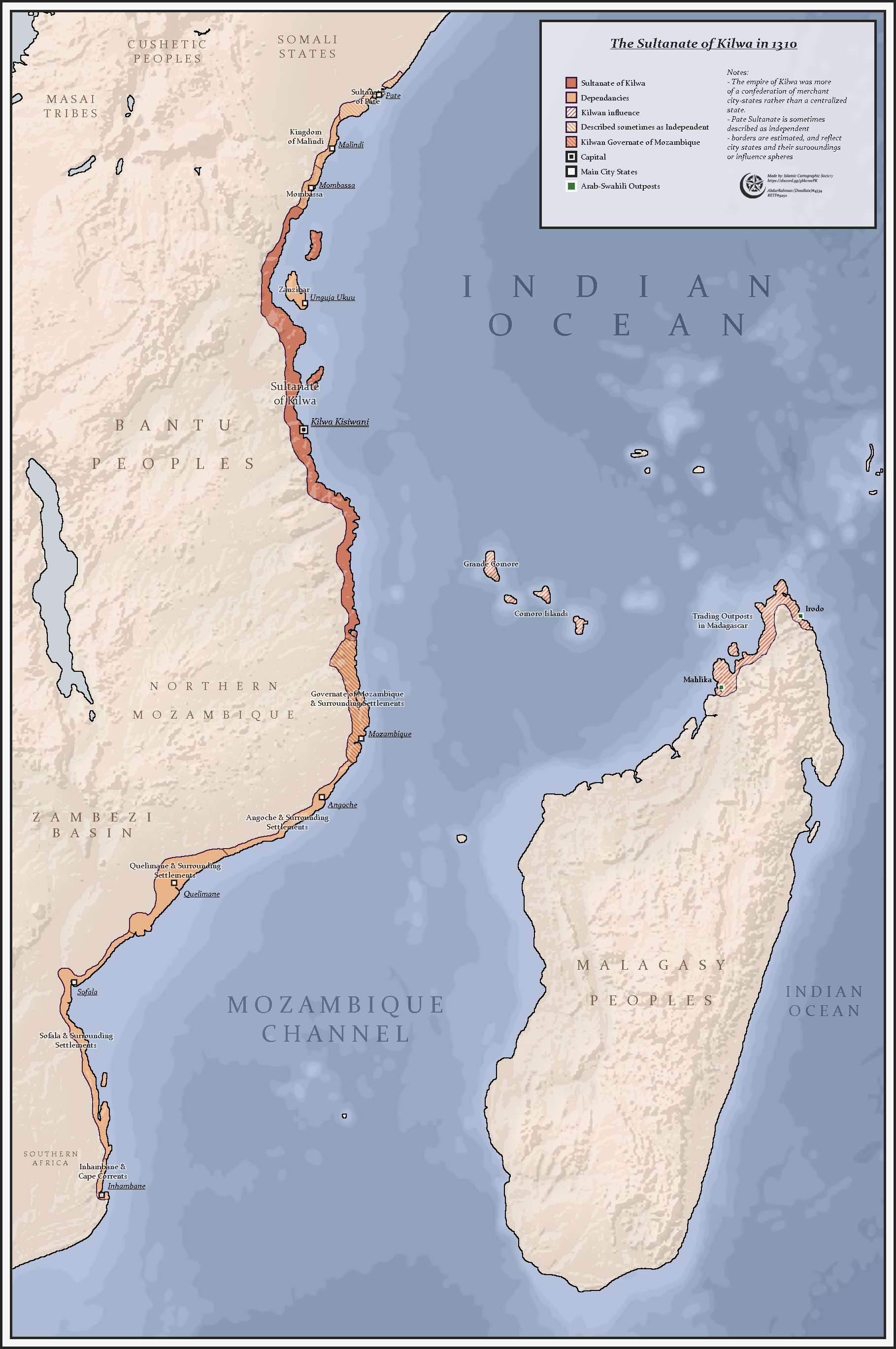
- Angoche within the Kilwa Sultanate
- Status: Vassal of the Kilwa Sultanate (early 16th century); Portuguese occupation (late 16th century–17th century); Independent (17th century–1910)
- Capital: Angoche Island
- Religion: Islam
- Demonyms: Angochians, Koti (Note: ethnic name of the inhabitants of the Angoche Islands)
- Government: Sultanate
- Sultan
  - c. 1485–?: Xosa (first)
  - 1861–1877: Musa Mohammad Sahib Quanto the fearsome
  - 1877–1890: Disputed between 7 claimants, the most effective leaders being Suleiman bin Rajah and Ussene Ibrahimo
  - 1903–1910: Farelay (last)
- Historical era: Early to Late modern period
  - Established: c. 1485
  - Civil War: 1877–1890
  - Conquered by Portugal: 1910
Preceded by	Succeeded by
Kilwa Sultanate	Portuguese Mozambique
- Today part of: Mozambique

The Angoche Sultanate was a sultanate centered on the islands of Angoche (Note: The name Angoche was a name given by the Portuguese to the archipelago consisting of a cluster of islands, which appears on many maps as one piece of land despite the fact that each island can be reached only by water), present-day Northern Mozambique coastline. Established in the late 15th century by dissidents from the Kilwa Sultanate, the sultanate arose during the decline of the Kilwa and Sofala, serving as an alternative entrepôt outside of Portuguese control to the inland trade fairs in the Zambezi and Mashonaland. The trade was mainly in ivory, ambergris, gold, and slaves, though the local craftsmen were known throughout the east for the straw mats and straw hats which they made.

Following the establishment of Portuguese factories along the Zambezi in the 1530s and 1540s, the settlement of the Marave in the hinterland — who blocked access to the mainland and imposed tolls on passing caravans — and internal conflicts among the ruling families, the sultanate experienced a period of decline, leading to the Portuguese gaining control of the sultanate by the late 16th century. This control was later relinquished in the following century as trade along the Angoche coast diminished significantly.

Angoche rose as a power again in the 1800s, quickly supplying a growing demand for ivory, rubber and slaves. The latter became increasingly important throughout the century as the European anti-slavery movement grew. The Sultanate expanded greatly into the hinterland with the help of Musa Quanto who later became sultan himself. By the time of Musa's death in 1877, the sultanate controlled most of the coast from the Licungo River to the south and Mozambique Island to the north and inland about 100 miles.

Following Musa's death, the sultanate fell into a 7-sided civil war and was finally conquered by a well-equipped Portuguese military expedition in 1910.

== History ==
A maritime archaeological survey has suggested that Angoche (the modern day city of Angoche was founded in 1865. Angoche was situated on the nearby Angoche Island) has been inhabited since c. 500 AD and has traded since the late first millennium AD.

=== Founding ===
According to the oral traditions recorded by Eduardo do Couto Lupi in his 1907 study Angoche, Angoche, Quelimane, and Moçambique, were founded by refugees from the Kilwa Sultanate, who settled in and dominated pre-existing Muslim communities shortly before Vasco da Gama's arrival in 1498. Hassani, a leader of the refugees who settled in Quelimane, died during a visit to Mussa in Moçambique, another refugee leader. Hassani was buried on Mafamale Island, and when Mussa visited his grave there, he thought that Angoche made a better location than Quelimane and so installed Hassani's son, Xosa, as sultan there.

Another possible version, as recorded in the Kilwa Chronicle, may point to the foundation of the Angoche sultanate. According to the Chronicle, in 1479, the wazir of Kilwa, al-Hassan ibn Suliman, overthrew the ruling dynasty of the Kilwa Sultanate. He ruled until 1485, when he was deposed, but regained power in 1486 and ruled until 1490. After his second removal from power, al-Hassan and his followers retreated to a location called Maghamghub, whose location has not been identified. In 1495, upon hearing of a new sultan's rise to power, al-Hassan attempted to reclaim the throne once more, gathering his forces at an unidentified site called Kisibi. This story fits well into the oral traditions of Angoche, which Newitt suggests in The Early History of the Sultanate of Angoche may have been Maghamghub, while Kisibi may have been the island of Quisiba in the Querimba Islands.

These versions of Angoche's founding, and variations of it, made the inhapakho, name for the noble families in Angoche, kin to the east African Swahili and to Mozambican coastal Muslim people.

In another version, the inhapakho are said to come from the Namuli Mountains to the Zambezi valley, the mythical cradle of all the Makwa, and founded by a great woman. In this region, people claim matrilineal clanship, descending from a common female ancestor gave the inhapakho a special claim on the land. The inhapakho strategically manipulated both of these versions of the history of their first-coming status.

=== Early History and first rise ===
The oral traditions recorded by Lupi continue that Xosa chose his place of residence at Muchelele on Catamoio Island. Xosa had four sons, each creating their own noble family. The heir to the throne founded the Inhanandare family and the other three founded the M'bilinzi, Inhamilala, and Inhaitide families. The latter three families were known as the Inhapakho (or Inhabaco) and lived on the other side of Catamoio Island. The Inhapakho mixed with the families of the Mwene, local important chiefs in the area, becoming powerful along the coast.

The throne stayed in the Inhanandare family until the death of the fourth sultan when there was no direct male heir to take the throne. The title of sultan went to the sultan's sister, who was married to an Inhamilala called Molidi. She ruled until her death without issue and the throne should've passed to one of the collaterals of the Inhanandare but the Inhamilala family refused to give up their power. In the ensuing civil war, the legitimate claimant, Carangueza-Muno, raised an army in Moma and defeated and killed Molidi. However, Carangueza-Muno was defeated by the rest of the Inhapakho and, along with the rest of the Inhanandare, was driven out of Angoche. The Inhapakho then divided the chief offices of state among themselves. The offices of sultan and wazir were to alternate between the M'bilinzi and Inhaitide families, while the position of capitaomor (agent of the Portuguese) remained within the Inhamilala family.

Eventually, the Inhanandare were allowed to return after renouncing all claims to the throne. The dates of the events above are unclear.

By the time of Pero da Covilham's visit to the east african coast in 1488/1489, Angoche was an unknown coastal settlement. The richest ports in the area at that time were Kilwa and Sofala, which were the main terminals to the interior trade routes. This was before the civil wars among the Shona rulers had disrupted the flow of gold to Sofala and Kilwa and the movement of the political centre of Shona power northwards to as far as the Zambezi escarpment. Based on the knowledge obtained from Covilham's visit, Portuguese explorer Francisco de Almeida occupied and fortified both of the ports between 1505 and 1507, while the northern coast was held through the alliance with the sultan of Malindi.

By the early 16th century Angoche and other settlements were described by Duarte Barbosa as vassals to the Kilwa Sultanate.

The Portuguese trade system in their new territories was monopolistic. Coastal merchants were required to obtain a license from the Portuguese to conduct business, and all trade goods had to be bought from the royal factor at Sofala, who set exploitative terms — buying cheaply and selling at high prices. This system failed to satisfy the African market with the quality of goods it wanted, leading Angoche to emerge as an alternative entrepôt outside the restrictive Portuguese-controlled market.

Even before Francisco landed in Sofala, Angoche and to a lesser extent Quelimane were already on the rise. Angoche Island was situated at the mouth of the Mluli River and benefited from the Zambezi route to the inland trade fairs of the Kingdom of Mutapa in Mashonaland. The markets at Angoche were mainly in ivory, slaves, gold, and ambergris, though the local craftsmen were known throughout the east for the straw mats and straw hats which they made. By 1511, the population of Angoche was greatly overestimated by Antonio de Saldanha to be 12,000 people, with a further "10,000 Muslims active in the interior."

=== Decline ===
Despite its status, Angoche maintained good relations with the Portuguese and even traded with them. This changed by the end of 1510 when rumours of a coup in Angoche caused the nation to cut off supplies to the Portuguese. The Muslim merchants along the coast began to resist by cutting off trade and supplies to pressure the Portuguese to leave.

In response, the Portuguese launched a military retaliation the following year. A 1,200-strong expedition force led by Saldanha attacked Angoche, burning and pillaging the settlement and capturing the sultan. However, Saldanha did not establish a permanent garrison in Angoche, and within a year, the Muslim traders had resumed their activities. In 1512, the Portuguese ship Santo António ran ashore off Angoche, leading to the capture of its captain, who was later exchanged for the imprisoned sultan.

After this, the Portuguese shifted their focus away from direct assaults on Angoche and instead tried to curb contraband trade through other means. In 1523, they raided the Quirimbas Islands, and in 1529, they attacked Mombasa, a key stronghold of hostile Muslim traders. Their most effective strategy was sending expeditions to explore and understand the local trade routes, especially the vital Zambezi River route to the interior. However, attempts to blockade the river's mouths resulted in a series of setbacks, delaying Portuguese expansion until the 1530s and 1540s, when they established factories along the Zambezi River.

With the establishment of these factories, the settlement of the Marave in the hinterland — who blocked access to the mainland and imposed tolls on passing caravans — and internal conflicts among the ruling families, the sultanate experienced a period of decline.

This decline allowed the Portuguese to establish full control of the island by the end of the century. During this time, trade on the island was managed by a separate royal factor, operating independently of the monopoly held by the captain of the Island of Mozambique, though it was eventually leased to him. The island's population numbered around 1,500, and it maintained a resident priest until 1627 when he was murdered. Trade had dwindled so much that the Portuguese eventually abandoned the island and the remaining trade was leased in 1709 to an Indian along with the port of Inhambane.

Francisco Moraes Pereira, during his visit to Angoche in 1752, noted that the area had become friendly to the Portuguese as the Portuguese had recently helped to restore the sultanate after it was sacked by an ex-slave and his group of bandits. By the time of the visit, the sultanate had expanded its influence south to the Portuguese border at M'lela and north to the São Antonio River, where the Sangage Sheikhdom was located. Pereira also noted that Angoche had been recently rebuilt on a new site after disputes with the Macua on the mainland had led to the abandonment of the old town.

=== Second rise and conquest ===
During the 1830s, the Sultanate quickly supplied a growing demand for ivory, rubber and slaves. The latter became increasingly important throughout the century, as the European anti-slavery movement grew. The independence of the Sultanate from European Empires made it a focus for the slave trade. By 1847, many businesses had relocated to Angoche from cities under Portuguese control such as Mozambique Island, to escape the taxes and slave laws there.

The growing demand for slaves was the reason behind Angoche's expansion onto the mainland, where they could control the caravan routes and create their own slave bases. inhapakho Musa Muhammad Sahib (who later became a sultan himself) realised this expansion of the Sultanate under the rule of Sultan Hasani Usufu. With the help of the widespread circulation of firearms, Musa launched a war against the Marrevoni Lomwe group of the Makwa, whom he subsequently defeated and enslaved, bringing more ivory and rubber with his conquest.

Angoche later came into conflict with the Alves da Silva family of the prazo Maganja da Costa. Its founder, António Alves da Silva, came from the province of Beira in Portugal in the early 19th century and established a trade in ivory and slaves, engaging a number of African soldiers or "sipais" from the Sena district. The ports under the da Silva family's control, especially Quizungo, which like Angoche were beyond European control, became one of the major rival ports for Angoche. It was these ports that became the next target of Musa's conquest. Like with the Marrevoni, Musa successfully conquered Maganja da Costa and enslaved some of its population.

In 1861, João Bonifàcio da Silva, one of the two da Silva brothers who owned Maganja da Costa, not only re-conquered his family lands, but also triumphantly entered the Sultan’s seat on Catamoyo Island in the Angoche archipelago. João's campaign had limited military assistance from Portugal who claimed both Angoche and Maganja da Costa as theirs and used the moment to strategically attribute Portuguese identity to Zambezi prazeiros even offering citizenship to the Afro-Portuguese master of the Maganja da Costa. Although the presence of the Portuguese would be mostly useless as the da Silva family's riches and army surpassed significantly those of the Portuguese.

The Alves da Silva family had no interest in occupying Angoche and handed over the territory to Portugal. However, the small garrison of Portuguese stationed on the Angoche mainland was no match for Musa who soon restored the Sultanate. Musa's ultimate goal was for Angoche to have full control over trade so when the Sangage Sheikhdom began to harbour Banyan merchants, Musa attacked Sangage. In 1870, Musa went to war with the Impamella, who did not want to recognize Angoche’s first-comer status. The Impamella gained the support of Portugal but were ultimately defeated in 1876.

=== Fall ===
In the 1860s, the Portuguese attacked the Sultanate, however their early campaign proved fruitless and they still had no direct control over Angoche. Following the death of Musa in 1877, Angoche descended into a civil war with 7 different claimants competing for power. By 1890, Mahamuieva, also known as Farelay had emerged victorious, and would rule until the end of the sultanate in 1910, when the sultanate was conquered by a well-equipped Portuguese military expedition.

== Cited works ==
- Bonate, Liazzat (2003). "The Ascendance of Angoche". Christian Michelsen Institute: 115–140.
- Newitt, Malyn (1972). "The Early History of the Sultanate of Angoche". The Journal of African History. 13 (3): 397–406. doi:10.1017/S0021853700011713. JSTOR 180586.
- Pollard, Edward (2018). "Settlement and Trade from AD 500 to 1800 at Angoche, Mozambique". African Archaeological Review: 1–29.
- Henriksen, Thomas H. (1978). Mozambique: a history. Collings. ISBN 978-0-86036-017-9.
