= Angoche Island =

Island in Mozambique

Coordinates: 16.244°S 39.907°E

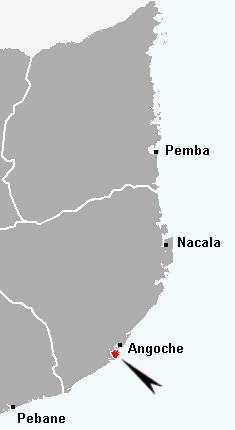
- Angoche Island is situated near the town of Angoche in Nampula Province, northern Mozambique
- Interactive map of Angoche Island

Administration
- Mozambique
- District: Angoche

Angoche Island is a small island in the district of same name in Mozambique. The island lies at the mouth of the Mluli River; the river enters the sea at the southernmost point of a large bay which contains a number of low, marshy islands. One of these islands was home to the ancient Islamic settlement of Angoche, and the island is thus known as Angoche Island. A coastal island, its main source of income was the illegal shipment of enslaved people, which enriched the aristocratic classes of the Nyapakho clan. It was not taken by the Portuguese until 1913, thanks to the brave resistance of the sultan, particularly Ibrahim Iussuf. His nephew, who was the commander-in-chief of a 30,000 men army took over power and opposed with tenacity the Portuguese until 1890. By then, Farlah, the last sultan, resumed the war against the Portuguese until he was captured in a battle in 1910 and deported to East Timor where he died in prison. The small island is subject to cyclones; Cyclone Huda in particular is remembered, and so permanent habitation has not been possible. Angoche is the largest producer of cashew and shrimps in Mozambique.

== History ==
Angoche was first mentioned by a Portuguese document in 1506. The former British consul, Lyons McLeod, published a brief history of the Angoche sultanate in 1860, followed by a more comprehensive account by Eduardo do Couto Lupi in his 1907 study, Angoche. According to Lupi, the islands of Angoche, Mocambique, and Quelimane were founded by a group of refugees from Kilwa shortly before the arrival of Vasco da Gama in 1498. The two leaders of the refugees, Mussa and Hassani, who settled at Mocambique and Quelimane respectively, found established Muslim communities in each place. Hassani died while on a visit to Mocambique and was buried on Mafamale Island (also off the mouth of the Angoche River). After Mussa visited the grave, he decided that Angoche was a more favourable locality than Queliman and installed Xosa, Hassani's son, as sultan of Angoche. The tomb of Sultan Hassani remained a centre of pilgrimage until at least the 19th century.

Other sources, such as the account of Duarte Barbosa in 1518, confirm that the language and customs of Angoche were the same as those of Mocambique. Duarte de Lemos noted the close trade relationships that still survived in 1508 between Angoche and Mocambique.
