= Ribáuè District =

Coordinates: 15.014°S 38.183°E

Ribáuè district in Mozambique

Ribáuè District is a district of Nampula Province in northeastern Mozambique. The principal town is Ribáuè.
