= Ribáuè =

Mozambican town in the Ribáuè District

- Town
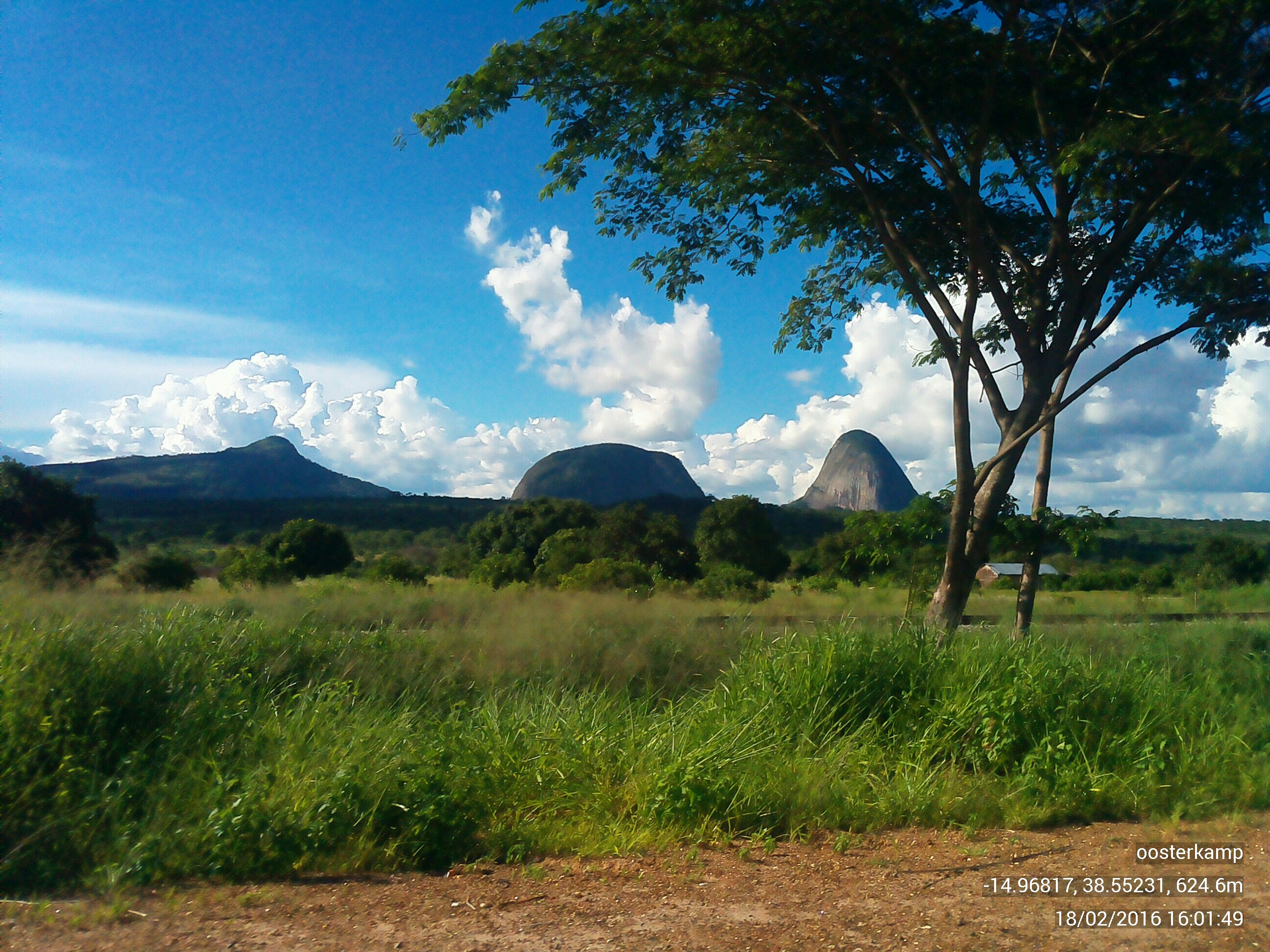
- Ribáuè grasslands

- Location within Mozambique
- Coordinates: 15°02′58″S 38°16′53″E
- Country: Mozambique
- Province: Nampula
- District: Ribáuè
- Time zone: UTC+2:00 (CAT)

Ribáuè is a town in Nampula province, northern Mozambique in the Ribáuè District.

Ribáuè lies immediately southeast of Mount Ribáuè.

== Transport ==
It is served by a station on the narrow gauge Nacala Railway system.

== See also ==
- Railway stations in Mozambique
