= Sheikhdom =

Geographical area ruled by a leader

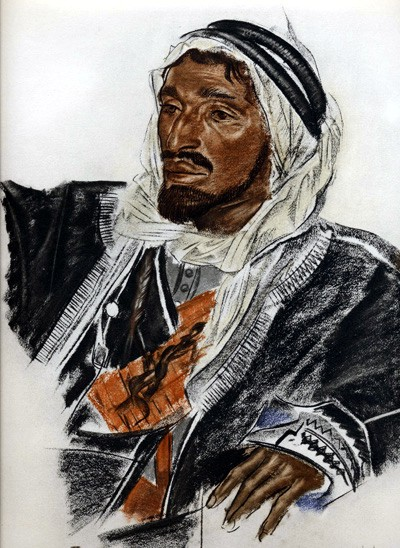
Sheikh Sattam de Haddadin of Palmyra, by Alexandr Evgenievich Yacovleff.

A sheikhdom or sheikdom (Arabic: مشيخة, romanized: Mashyakhah) is a geographical area or a society ruled by a tribal leader known as a sheikh (Arabic: شيخ). Sheikhdoms exist almost exclusively within Arab countries, particularly in the Arabian Peninsula (Arab States of the Persian Gulf), with some notable exceptions throughout history (e.g. the Sangage Sheikhdom).

Although some countries are ruled by a sheikh, they are not typically referred to as sheikdoms, but kingdom, emirate, or simply state, and their ruler usually has another royal title such as king or emir.
