= Nampula District =

Coordinates: 15°07′S 39°16′E

Nampula District is a district of Nampula Province in north-eastern Mozambique. The principal town is Nampula which is also the provincial capital.
