= Malema, Mozambique =

Malema
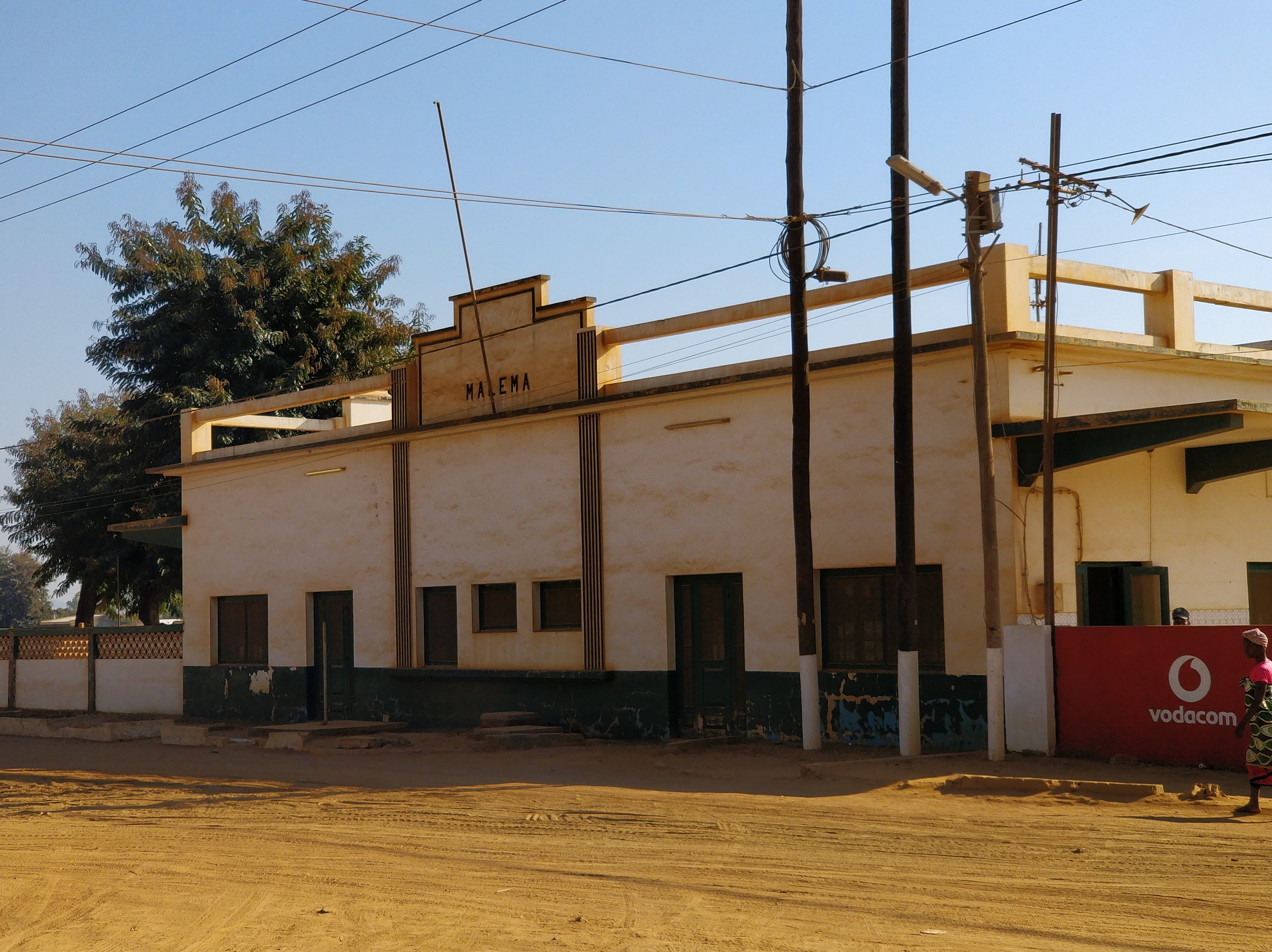
- Train station of Malema

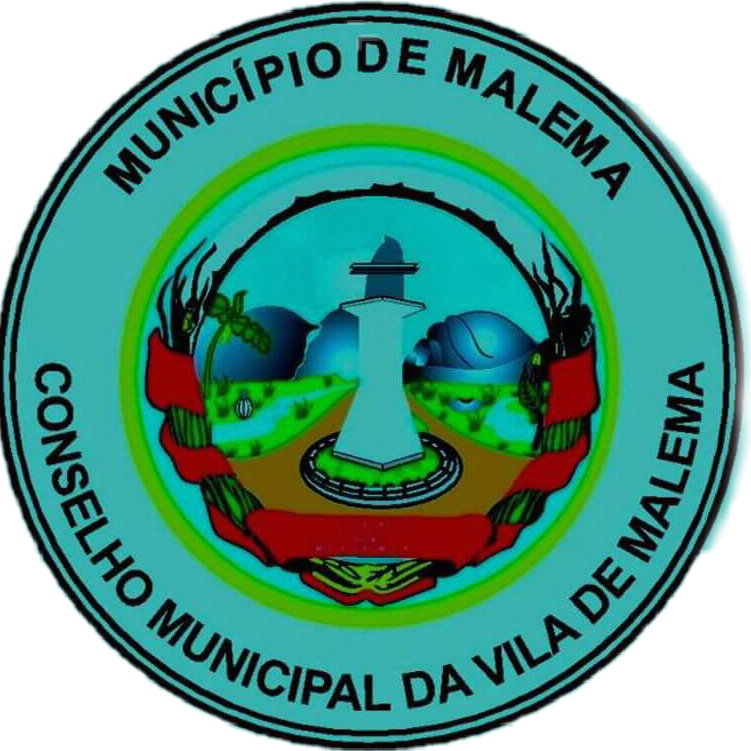
- Seal

- Location within Mozambique
- Coordinates: 14°56′55″S 37°24′52″E
- Country: Mozambique
- Provinces: Nampula Province
- District: Malema District

Population (2015 (projected))
  - Total: 195,077
- Time zone: CAT

Malema is a town in the district of Malema. It is situated within the province of Nampula in Mozambique. The district borders the districts of: Ribaue, Lalaua, Alto Molocue, Gurue, Cuamba, and others. The district is dependent on agricultural production and the main sources are sourgum, corn, peanuts, and onions.

== Transport ==
It is served by a way-station of the southern network of Mozambique Railways as well as the EN 13.
