= Mount Ribáuè =

Mountain in Mozambique

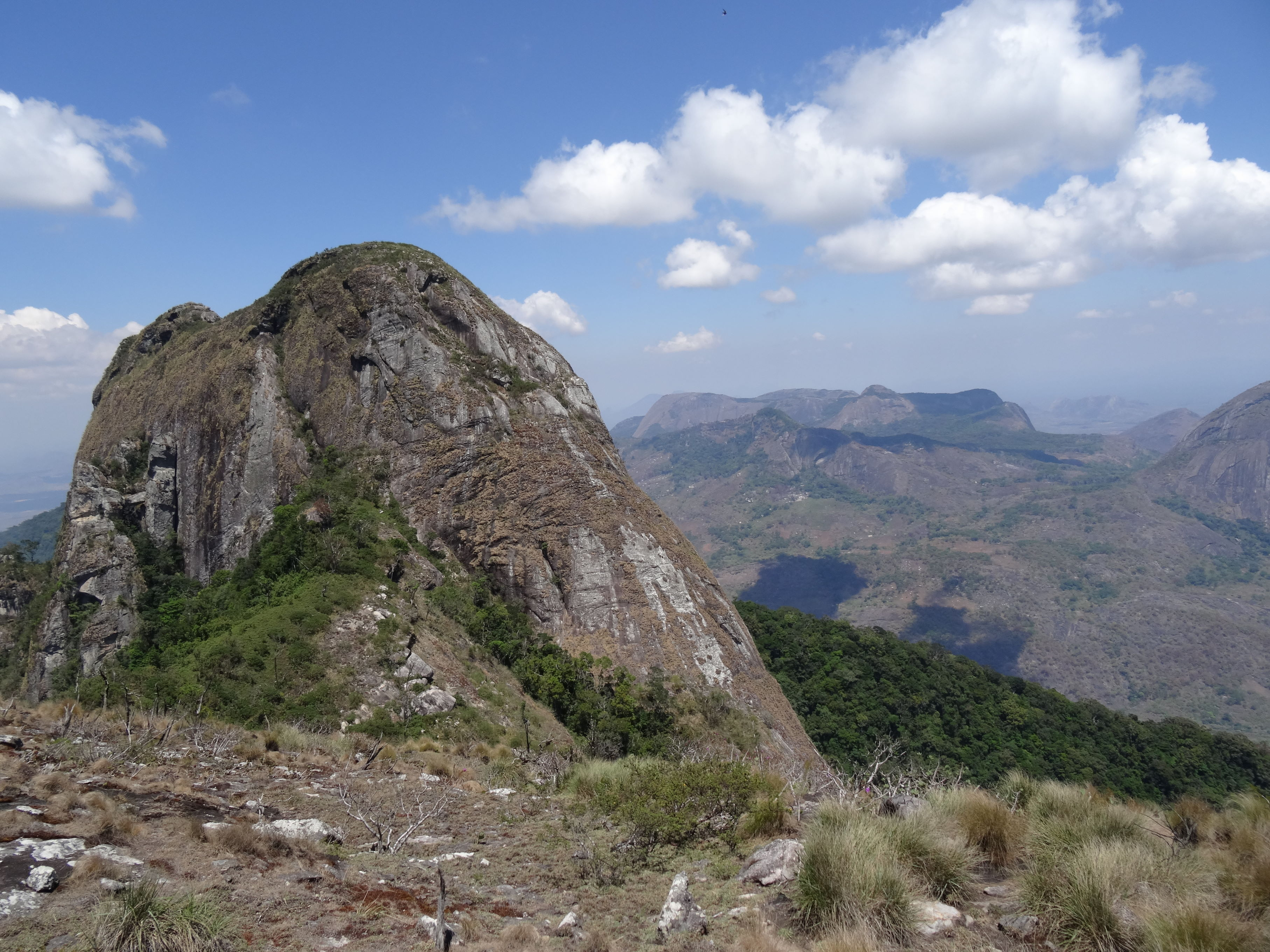

Highest point
- Elevation: 1,777 m (5,830 ft)
- Coordinates: 14°53′22″S 38°18′58″E

Geography
- Location within Mozambique
- Location: Nampula Province, Mozambique

Mount Ribáuè, also known as Monte Ribáuè, is a mountain in Nampula Province of Mozambique.

The mountain consists of two granite inselbergs, separated by a narrow valley approximately 3km wide. The eastern inselberg is called Mount M’pàluwé.

The lower slopes are mostly cultivated. Dry miombo woodland can be found on the middle slopes, and in the valley between the east and west peaks. The highest peaks are mostly bare granite, with pockets of montane heathland. The mountain has no year-round streams, but several intermittent streams run during the wet season.

It forms part of a proposed ecoregion, to be called the South East Africa Montane Archipelago (SEAMA).
