= Nampula Province =

Province of Mozambique

Coordinates: 15°15′S 39°30′E

Nampula
- Province
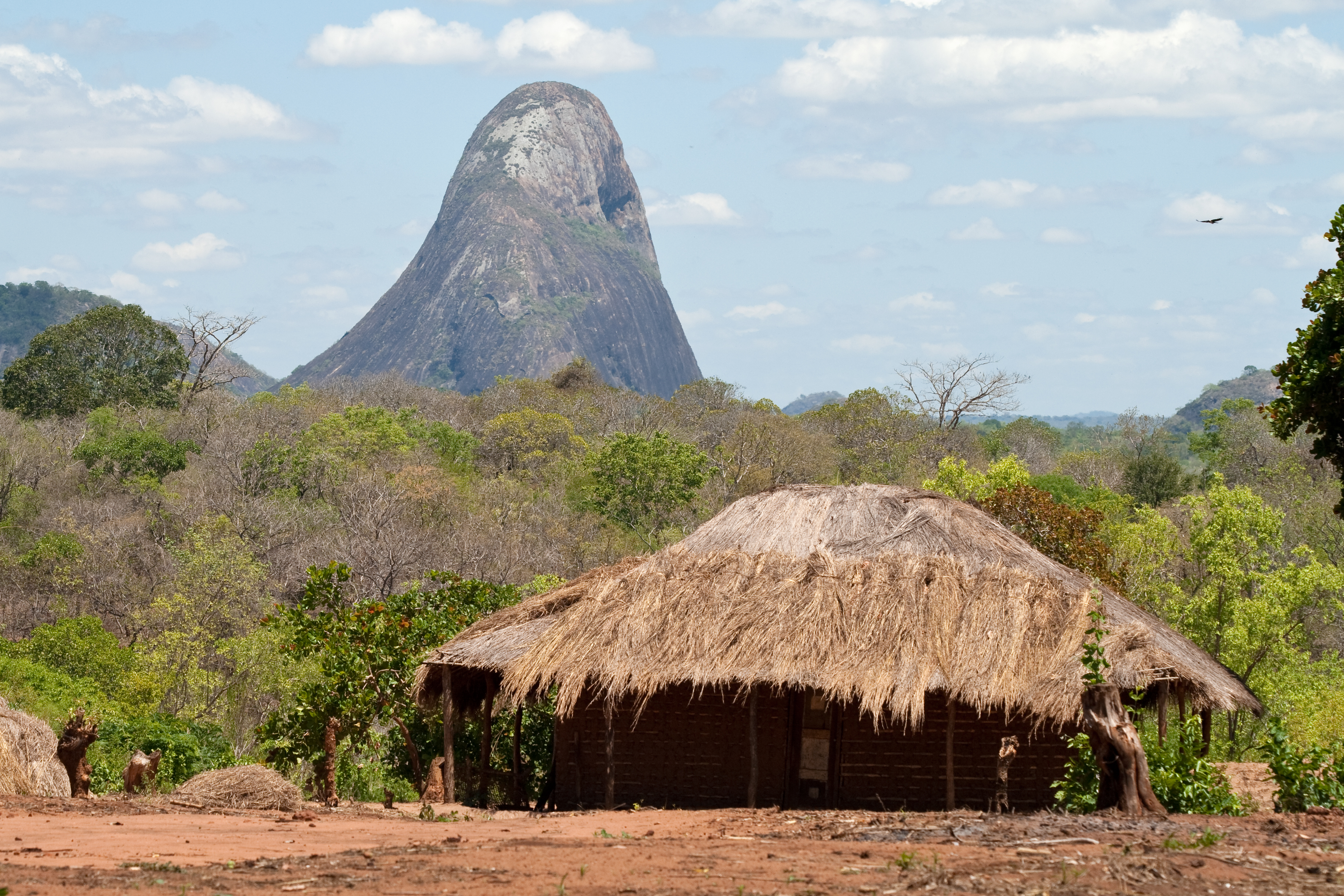

- Nampula, Province of Mozambique
- Country: Mozambique
- Capital: Nampula

Government
  - Governor: Eduardo Abdula

Area
  - Total: 79,010 km^{2} (30,510 sq mi)

Population (2017 census)
  - Total: 5,758,920
  - Density: 72.89/km^{2} (188.8/sq mi)
- Postal code: 31xx
- Area code: (+258) 26
- HDI (2019): 0.445 low · 7th of 11
- Website: www.nampula.gov.mz

Nampula [nɐ̃ˈpulɐ] is a province of northern Mozambique. It has an area of 79,010 km^{2} (30,510 sq mi) and a population of 5,758,920, making it the most populous province in Mozambique (2017 census). Nampula is the capital of the province.

== History ==
Under Portuguese rule, this province was named Moçambique but with independence, the name Mozambique was used for the entire country and the province renamed for its capital. The island, Ilha de Moçambique, was declared a UNESCO World Heritage Site in 1992. Massive refugee movements due to 15 years of civil war have destroyed a unique coexistence of many cultures on this island.

== Geography ==
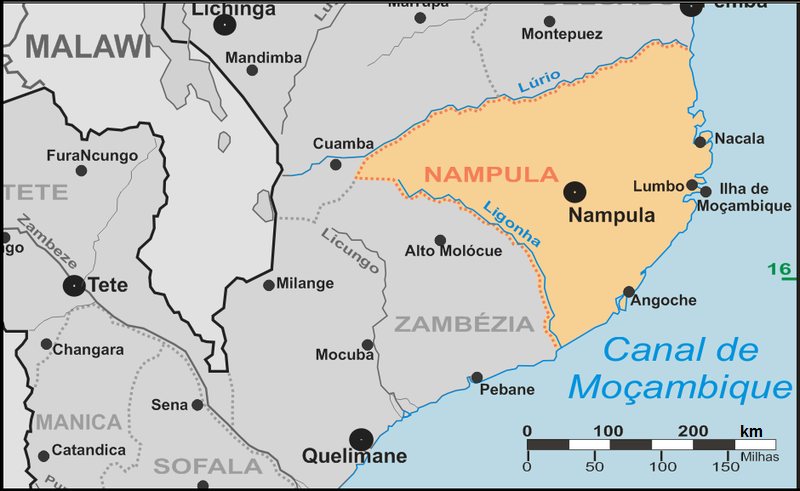
Provincial map

Nampula Province is located in northeastern Mozambique. It is bordered on the north by Cabo Delgado Province and the Lúrio River, which the Mozambican government has plans to build a 120-megawatt hydroelectric plant on to supply electricity to the province and Cabo Delgado Province. Napula Province borders Niassa Province to the northwest and west, Zambezia Province to the southwest, and the Indian Ocean to the east. The Ligonha River separates it from Zambezia Province; the Makua peoples inhabit the area to the north of the river. From the south, the Malema River flows from the Namuli hills into the Ligonha. The Meluli River flows down through the province in a southeasterly direction, flowing into the Indian Ocean to the south of Angoche Island.

To the west of the city of Nampula, which lies in the heart of the province, are several hilly areas. Mountains in the province include Mount Inago (1804 m), Mount Ribaue, Mount Panda and Mount Nairucu.

== Districts ==
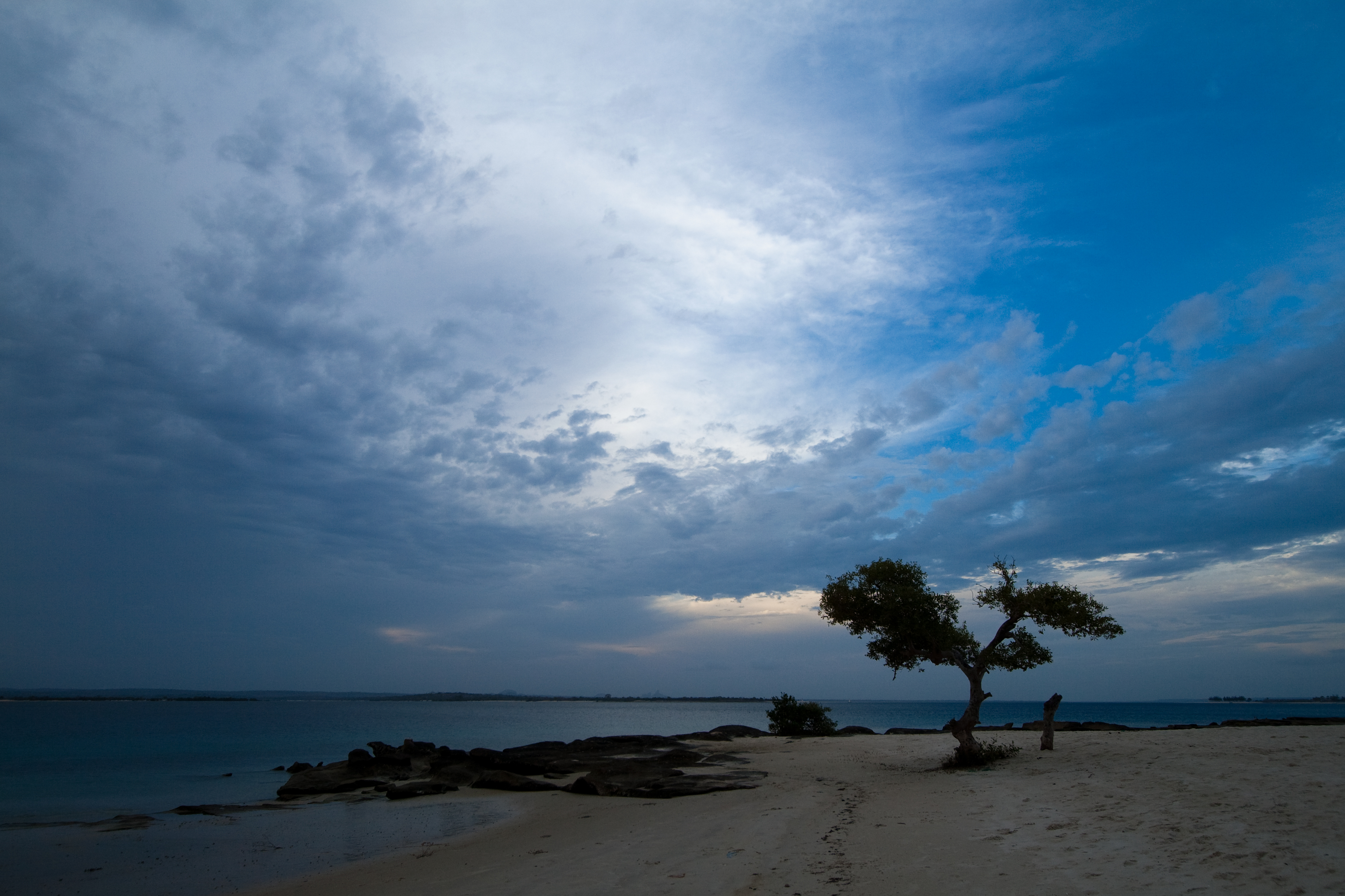
Nacala Beach

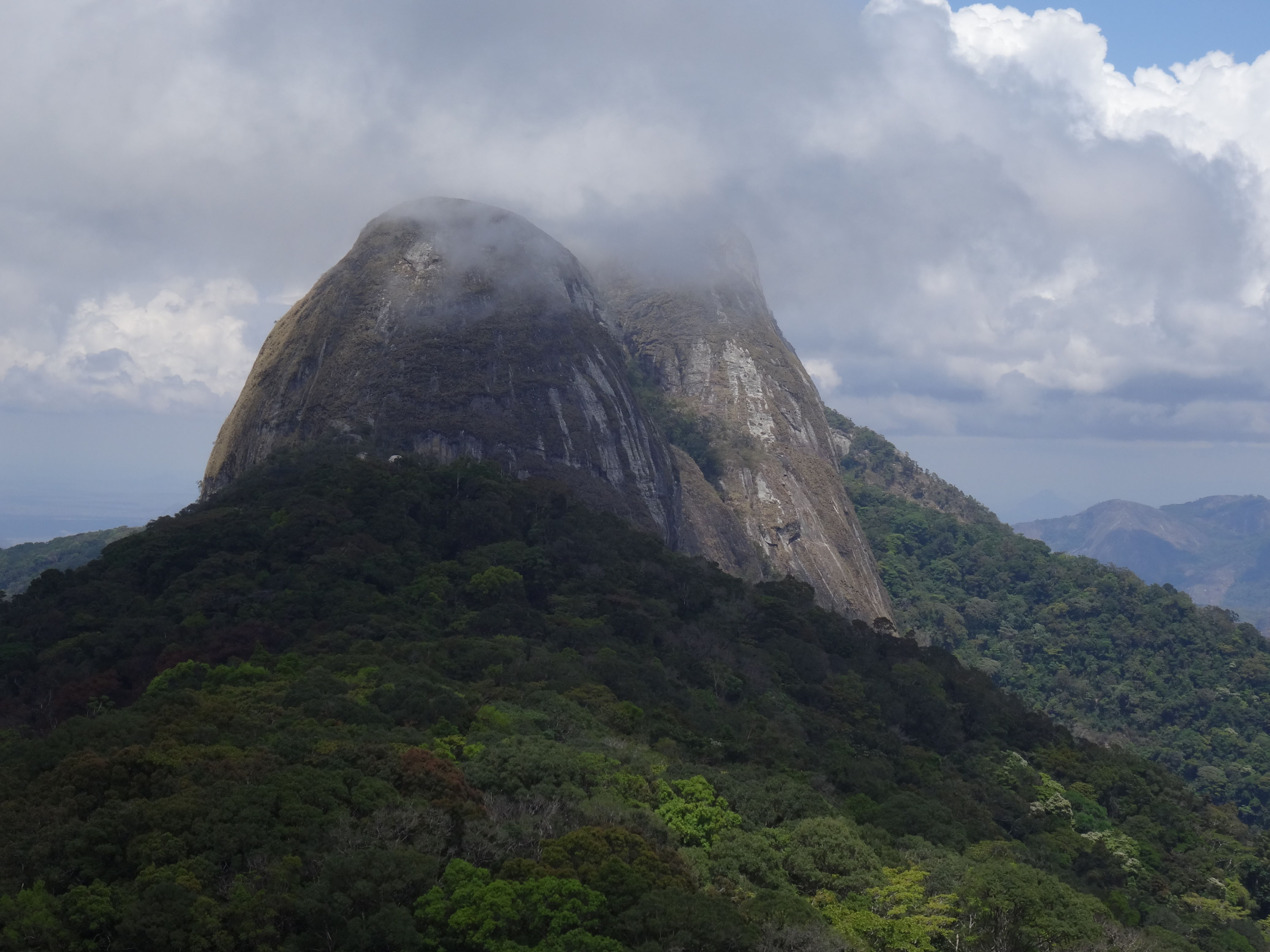
Mount Ribaue

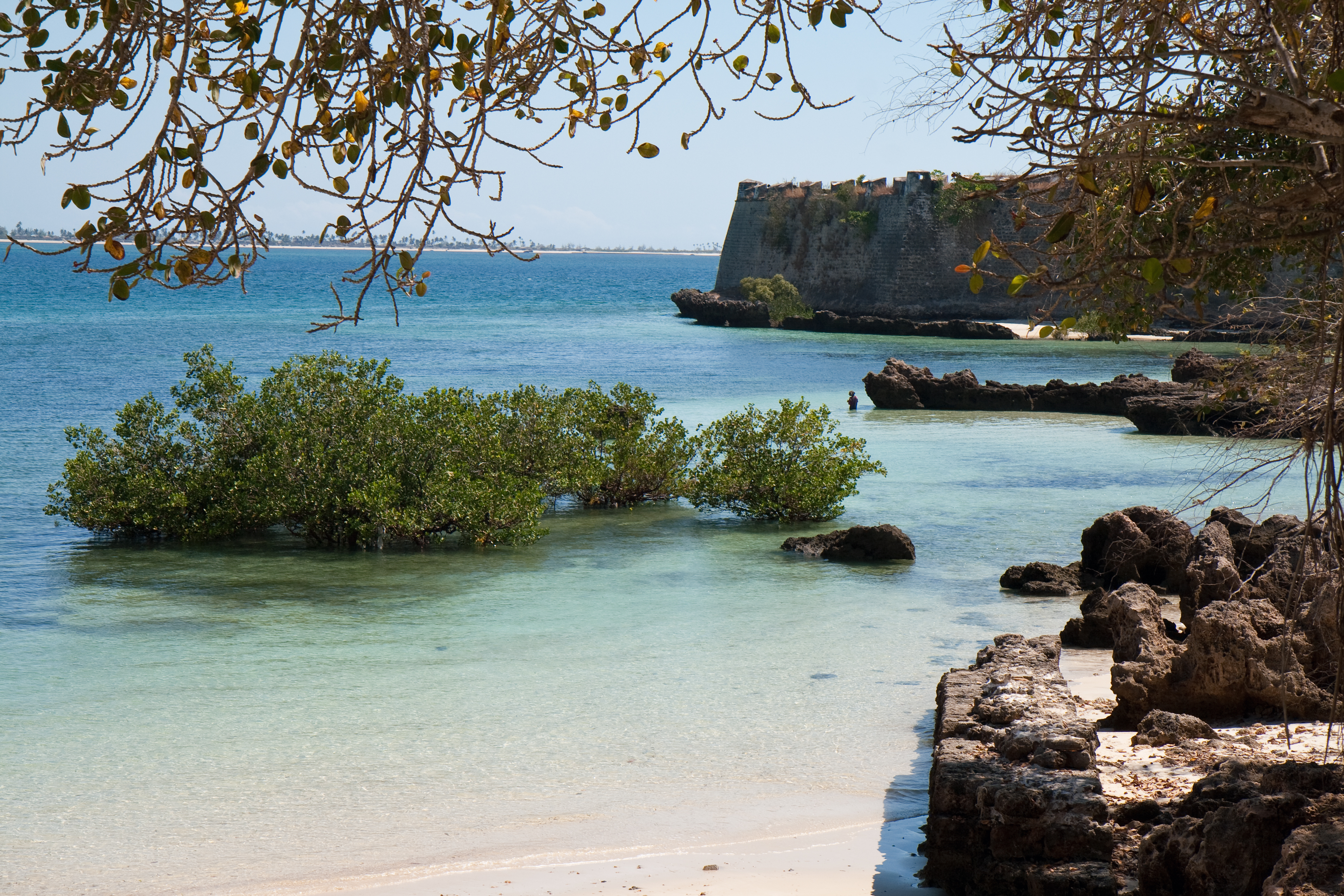
São Sebastião Fortress

Nampula Province is divided into 23 districts:

- Angoche District
- Eráti District
- Ilha de Moçambique District
- Lalaua District
- Larde District
- Liúpo District
- Malema District
- Meconta District
- Mecubúri District
- Memba District
- Mogincual District
- Mogovolas District
- Moma District
- Monapo District
- Mossuril District
- Muecate District
- Murrupula District
- Nacala-a-Velha District
- Nacarôa District
- Nampula District
- Rapale District
- Ribáuè District

and the municipalities of:

- Angoche
- Ilha de Moçambique
- Malema
- Monapo
- Mossuril
- Nacala Porto
- Nampula
- Ribáuè

== Economy ==
The region is a major producer of cotton, and is known as the Cotton Belt of Nampula. Also produced in the province are cashew nuts, tobacco, gems and other minerals. Many of the cotton and tobacco farms in Nampula Province are state-owned.

The Millennium Challenge Corporation (MCC) was involved in a $507 million project with Mozambique to develop the water delivery system in Nampula Province over five years (2008–2013), to benefit an estimated 1.2 million people. The project aimed to lay down some 16 kilometers of transmission pipes, constructing or rehabilitating four pumping stations and a new distribution center, to raise the height of the Nacala Dam from 17 metres (56 ft) to 19 metres (62 ft) and to expand a treatment plant to enable it to process 1041 cubic meters of water per hour. An evaluation report was published in 2020. UNICEF and USAID have subsequently funded and constructed water and sanitation facilities at Ramiane Health Centre and 8 other health centres in Nampula Province.

Religion in Nampula Province
1. Christianity (46.8%)
2. Islam (39.6%)
3. Irreligious (10.3%)
4. Other Religion (1.74%)
5. Unknown (1.47%)

== Demographics ==
According to the 1997 census, the province had 2,975,747 inhabitants and an area of 78,197 square kilometres, hence resulting in a population density of 38.05 inhabitants per km^{2}. Between 1997 and 2007, the population grew by 25.34%. At the time of the 2007 census, a population of 3,985,613 residents was recorded. With an area 79,010 square kilometres, the population density was about 50.44 people per km^{2}.

Historical population
Year	Pop.	±% p.a.
1980	2,402,700	—
1997	3,063,456	+1.44%
2007	4,084,656	+2.92%
2017	5,758,920	+3.49%
