= Melema =

Melema may refer to:

- Tito Melema, a character in Romola
- Tito Melema, a mixed media work by Edward Clifford
- Tesma melema, an African moth; see List of moths of Uganda
- Saphenista melema Razowski, a moth in the Saphenista genus

== See also ==
- Malema
