= Sangage Sultanate =

1600s – 1913 polity in Mozambique

The Sangage Sultanate was a coastal African sultanate (Portuguese: sultanato) in modern-day Mozambique, established in the mid-1600s and lasting until 1913. The people of Sangage retained a distinct culture but are related to the Swahili people; their language, Esangaji, is also similar to the Swahili language.

== History ==
=== Background ===
Sangage was one of three main Muslim settlements between Quelimane and Mozambique Island, the others being the Angoche Sultanate and Sancul Sultanate. Sangage, like Sancul, was founded by Shirazi clans originating from Mozambique Island after the Portuguese seized it in the 17th century. It was located between the Metomode and Mogincual Rivers, bordering Sancul to the north. These clans first migrated to Sancul and then to Sangage, purchasing the coastal land from the pre-established Angoche. They held a considerable number of vassals, including the chiefs of Mogincual, Mpamella, and bands of Mogovolla, among others.

=== Arrival of the Portuguese and demise ===
By the time of Portuguese arrival in the early 19th century, Sangage began thriving on the slave trade, becoming an economic rival to the Angoche to the south. Since the Portuguese lacked a military foothold in northern Mozambique, they exerted influence by widening cleavages in native politics. In the 1880s, Sangage welcomed a community of Vanya Indian slave traders, causing Angoche sultan Musa Muhammad Sahib to attack Sangage in 1885. Sangage was besieged again by Sahib's son, Sultan Usseni Ibrahimo.

The Portuguese intervened, forcing the sultan to open a garrison for the Portuguese in return for the title of regidor. Sangage was also forbidden from slave trading. However, the sultan's successor, Musa Ibrahimo Phiri (1904–1912) continued to quietly resist the Portuguese and traded slaves. Ultimately, the Portuguese defeated Phiri in a decisive campaign in 1913. They were the last vestige of Swahili colonial resistance in Mozambique, subsumed into the Portuguese colonial administration.

== See also ==
- Angoche Sultanate
