= Malema District =

Coordinates: 14°56′55″S 37°24′52″E

Malema District in Mozambique

Malema District is a district at the far west Nampula Province in north-eastern Mozambique. It covers an area of 6,386 square kilometres (2,466 sq mi) and had a population of 128,732 as of the 1997 Mozambican census and an estimated population of 149,782 as of 2005.

The district is divided into three postos. The eponymous posto of Malema - further divided into 4 localities: Malema (the seat), Muralelo, Nataleia, and Nioce - has a population of 92,324. The posto of Chihulo, with one eponymous locality, has a population of 11,701. The posto of Mutuali, with the sole locality being Tapaca, has a population of 45,756.

On 2 April 2025, the government of Mozambique retook control of Mutuali from the Naparamas, a peasant militia aligned with former presidential candidate Venâncio Mondlane. On 16 April 2025, the Mozambican police clashed again with the Naparamas in the same locality of Mutuali; they killed somewhere between 5 and 23 people, possibly including local residents.

In late April 2026, a herd of elephants crossed the Lúrio River into the district, destroying at least 10 hectares of maize and pigeon pea crops across at least two villages.
