= Maganja da Costa District =

Coordinates: 17°11′S 37°28′E

Maganja da Costa district in Mozambique

Maganja da Costa District is a district of Zambezia Province in Mozambique.

== Introduction ==
The name probably derives from that of the Mang'anja people, now mainly resident in southern Malawi. However, from the 17th century onwards, Portuguese explorers used the name Manganja as a territorial designation, and called the people living in that area Maganjas. The original area occupied by the Mang'anja, and the area called Manganja, extended south and east of the area this people currently occupy, and the name of the town Maganja da Costa ("Maganja of the Coast"), about 20 kilometres inland from the Indian Ocean near Pebane records their former eastern extent. At present, the population of the area is mixed, and the largest group consists of Makua people from northern Mozambique who first arrived in the 19th century. The area does not now contain any Mang'anja people, but in 1960 the oldest inhabitants recalled that a few survivors of the original population still spoke the Mang'anja language and used to visit rain shrine of M'Bona in southern Nyasaland, a cult exclusive to Mang'anja people.

== The Alves da Silva ==
During the 19th century, for major Afro-Portuguese or Afro-Asian families established in Mozambique were involved in the Zambezi wars. The Caetano Pereira to the north of the Zambezi river, the Vaz dos Anjos of Indian origin near Quelimane, the Da Cruz, also near Quelimane, whose founder was from Thailand and Alves da Silva da Silva. The Maganja da Costa district became the stronghold of the Alves da Silva family. Its founder, António Alves da Silva, came from the province of Beira in Portugal in the early 19th century and established a trade in ivory and slaves, engaging a number of African soldiers or "sipais" from the Sena district. His two sons, João Bonifacio and Victorino Romão, became prominent slave traders operating in the Luangwa and Lower Shire valleys. As they were unable to use the port of Quelimane after the banning of the legal slave trade in 1830, they built a number of fortified villages called “aringas”, consisting of a wooden stockade and earthworks in the form of a ditch and bank in the district. The aringas were manned by about a dozen chikunda bands or "ensacas" of armed retainers, initially each of around 250 men, under its own captain. The largest da Silva aringa in the Maganja da Costa district was known as M'Passue after the African title used by the head of the family, and it was said to be the largest aringa ever built in Mozambique. Much of the slave trade on the central Mozambique coast was in the hands of the Angoche sultanate, which came into conflict with the Alves da Silva as its slave raiding moved further inland. João Bonifacio was killed in 1861 when unsuccessfully attacking an Agoche barracoon, and Victorino Romão died childless in 1874, ending the direct line of succession from António Alves da Silva

== The "Military Republic" ==
After the death of Victorino Romão, Maganja da Costa evolved into a form of chikunda republic. Most of the major decisions, particularly those related to warfare, were taken by assemblies of the chikunda, although each band elected a captain, or "Kazembe" of their aringa from the leaders of the squads making up the band, and each of the 12 Kazembes formed a council for the military leader, or captain-general that they elected from among themselves. The Portuguese military commander, João de Azevedo Coutinho, called this arrangement the "Military Republic of Maganja da Costa". The ensacas, originally of about 250 men, grew to between 1,000 and 1,200 men each. They were recruited from enslaved captives, but after some years of satisfactory service, they gained a degree of freedom and were granted privileges, including a share of the tribute extracted from the local population.

By the 1890s, the "Military Republic" was in decline as the illicit slave trade had largely been suppressed. The Mozambique Company, founded in 1891, began to encroach on the area over which the Maganja da Costa chikunda believed that they had a monopoly of ivory trading and, in 1892, attacked and destroyed several of the company's trading posts. However, at other times they cooperated with the Portuguese and, in 1897, de Azevedo Coutinho was able to recruit an armed force from the Maganja da Costa chikunda to overcome resistance to Portuguese colonial rule in the Zambezi valley. Once resistance in other areas had been suppressed, Maganja da Costa was itself occupied in 1898, by Portuguese forces, in alliance with several local chiefs opposed to the chikunda. Although the Maganja da Costa chikunda resisted, their armaments were out of date and they suffered 600 dead and many captured when their independence was ended.
