= Moma District =

Coordinates: 16.757°S 39.222°E

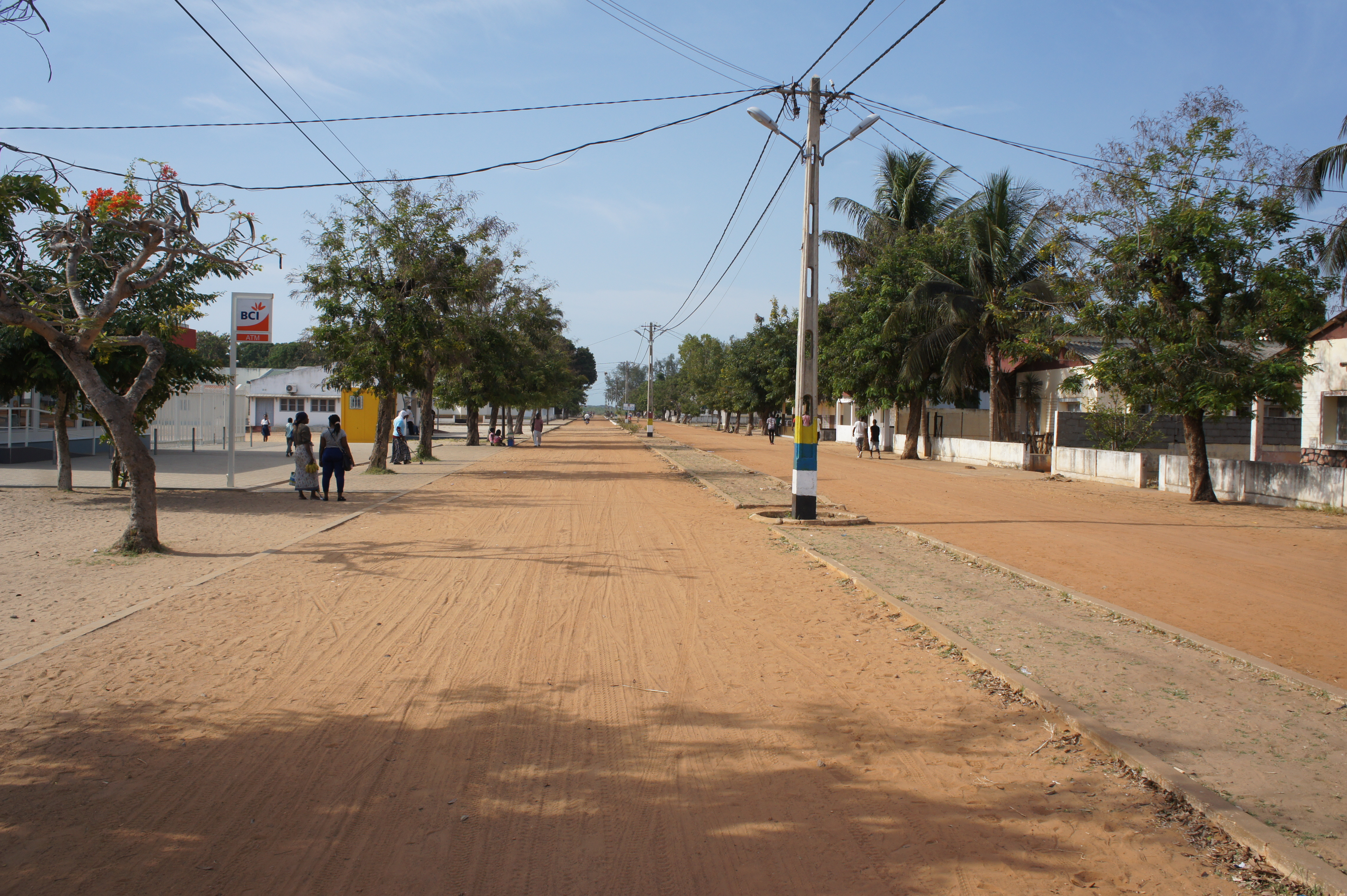
View of the district's capital

Moma District is a district of Nampula Province in north-eastern Mozambique. The principal town is Moma.
