= Mogovolas District =

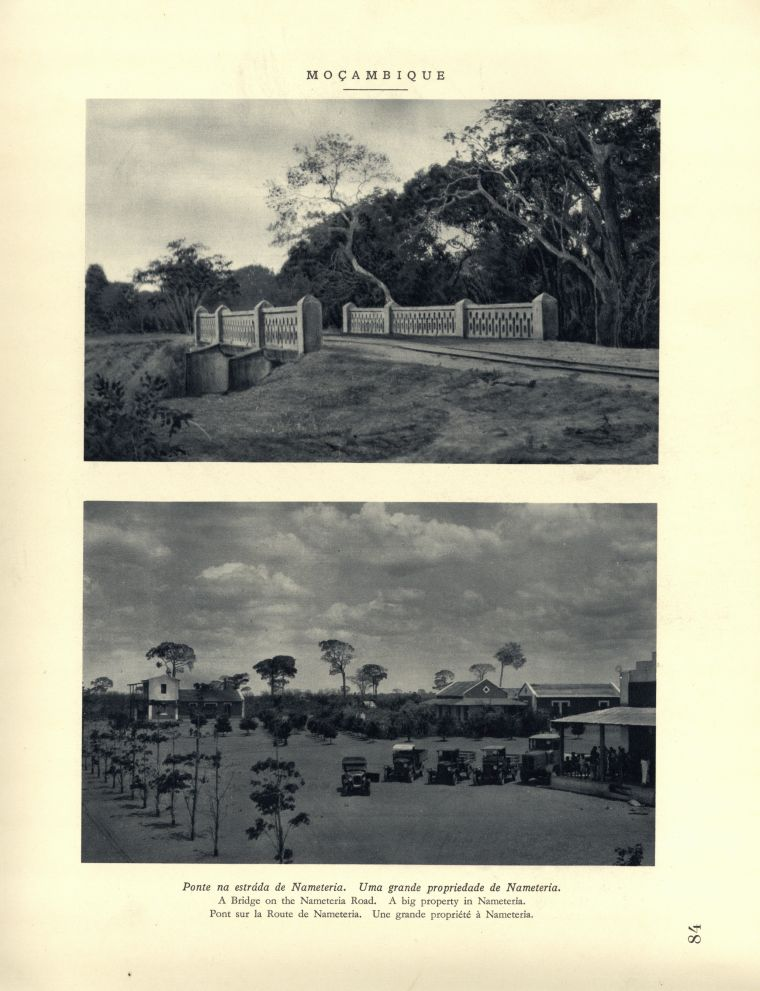
Picture of the Mogovolas District

Mogovolas District is a district of Nampula Province in north-eastern Mozambique. The principal town is Nametil.
