= Mogincual District =

Coordinates: 15.566°S 40.442°E

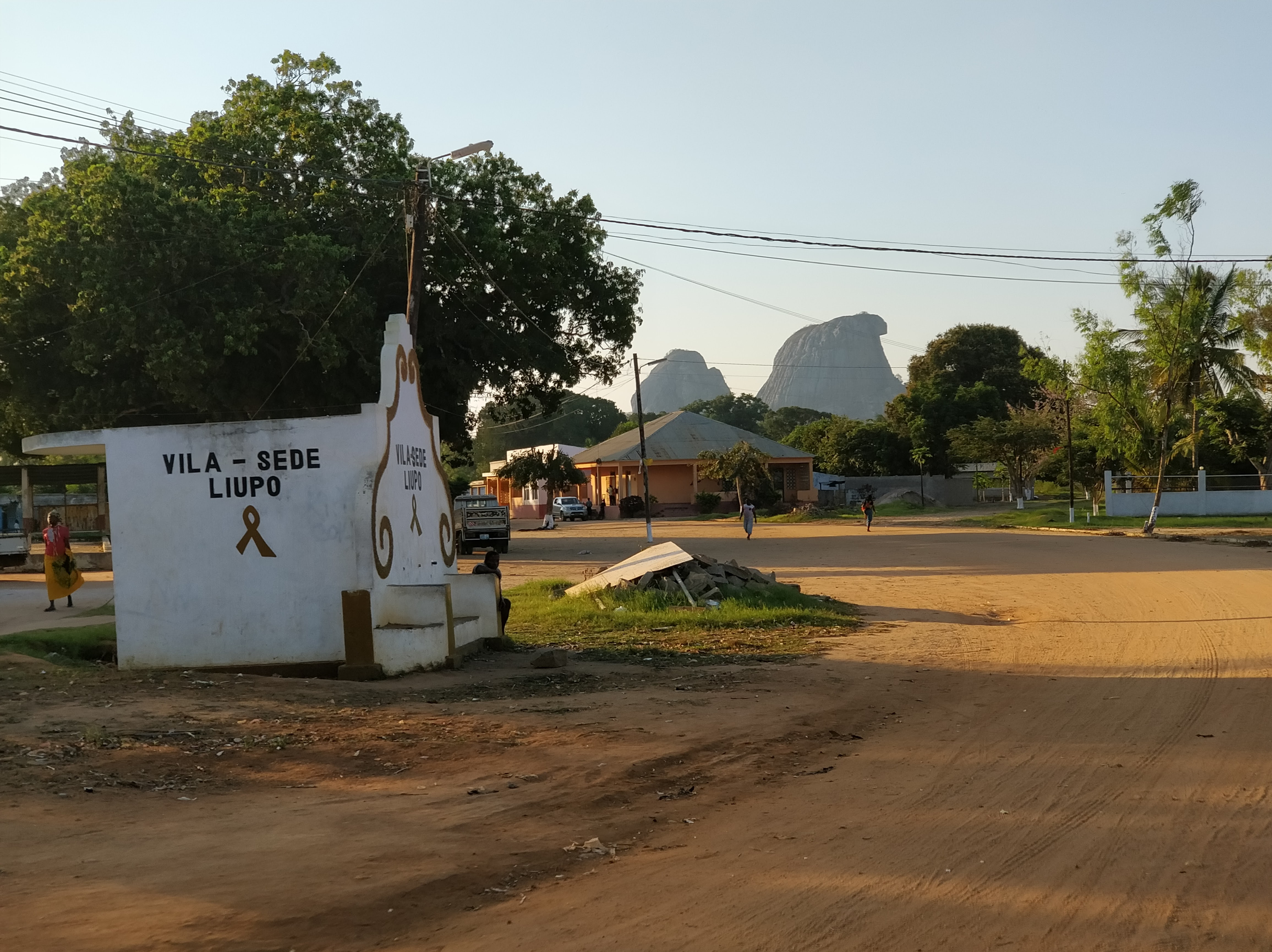
View of the town Liúpo, seat of district of Mogincual

Mogincual District is a district of Nampula Province in north-eastern Mozambique. The principal town is Mogincual.
