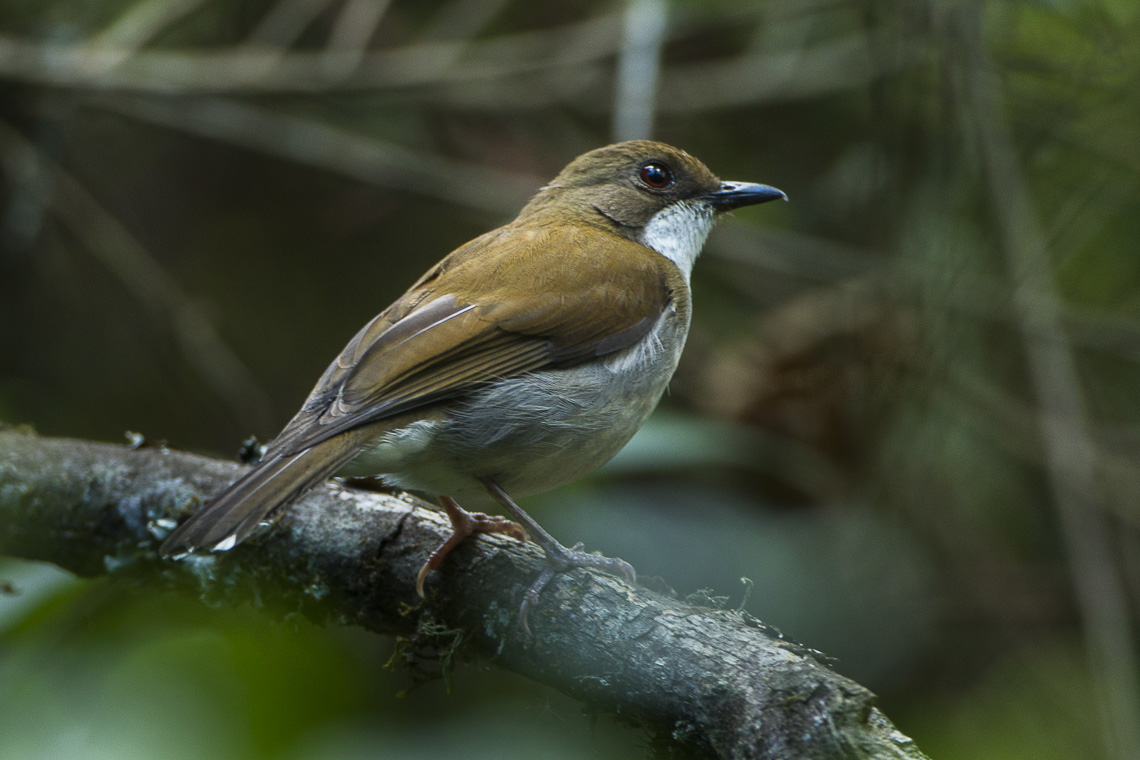

Conservation status
- Vulnerable (IUCN 3.1)

Scientific classification
- Kingdom: Animalia
- Phylum: Chordata
- Class: Aves
- Order: Passeriformes
- Family: Muscicapidae
- Genus: Chamaetylas
- Species: C. choloensis

Binomial name
- Chamaetylas choloensis (Sclater, WL, 1927)

Synonyms
- Alethe choloensis Sclater, 1927; Pseudalethe choloensis (Sclater, 1927)

= Thyolo alethe =

Species of bird

The Thyolo alethe or Cholo alethe (Chamaetylas choloensis) is an endangered species of bird in the Old World flycatcher family Muscicapidae. The Thyolo alethe is a medium-sized chat, usually measuring 17–20 cm in length and weighing around 43 grams. It has a cinnamon-brown head, upperparts, and wings, contrasting with the pure white throat and pale gray to dirty white underparts. The back, rump, and scapulars are rufous-brown. The tail is dark brown with white spots at the tips. The Thyolo alethe is only found on several isolated mountain peaks in southeastern Malawi and northeastern Mozambique. It was previously more widespread in both countries, but has had its range reduced due to the deforestation of many of the submontane forests it inhabits. It feeds on a variety of small invertebrates, including beetles, spiders, and Dorylus driver ants.

== Taxonomy ==
The Thyolo alethe was described as Alethe choloensis by the English ornithologist Philip Sclater in 1927 on the basis of a specimen collected the previous year from the Cholo Mountains in southeastern Malawi. Although Alethe was initially placed in the thrush family Turdidae, studies of nuclear and mitochondrial DNA evidence showed that the genus was better placed within the Old World flycatcher family Muscicapidae. Genetic evidence also showed that several of the species in the genus Alethe were polyphyletic, including the Thyolo alethe. This resulted in the species being moved to the genus Pseudalethe, which was later replaced with the name Chamaetylas as the latter has priority over the former.

The Thyolo alethe currently has two subspecies recognized by the IOU:

- C. c. choloensis (Sclater, 1927): The nominate subspecies, it is found in southeastern Malawi and on Mount Chiperone in Mozambique.
- C. c. namuli (Vincent, 1933): Found on Mount Namuli and Mount Mabu in Mozambique. The population on Mount Inago is also thought to represent this subspecies. Has a whiter breast, belly, and undertail coverts than choloensis.

The Thyolo alethe is most closely related to the white-chested alethe, with which it forms a superspecies.

== Description ==
The Thyolo alethe is a medium-sized chat, usually measuring 17–20 cm in length and weighing around 43 grams. The head is dark cinnamon brown from the forehead to the mantle, transitioning to rufous on the back, rump, and scapulars. The lores, cheeks, and ear-coverts are dark brown, while the chin and throat are pure white. The upper breast is pale grey to dirty white, with a slightly darker at the edges. Some individuals have a small brown patch on the side of the upper breast. The rest of the breast and belly are pale grey or dirty white. The flanks are grey with a brown wash. The wing feathers are dark brown to rufous, while the axillaries and underwing coverts are white. The tail feathers are dark brown, with cinnamon brown borders and white spots at the tips, small in the central pair and progressively increasing in size towards the sides. The uppertail coverts are cinnamon brown, while the undertail coverts are buff-tinted dirty white. Adults with worn plumage may appear slightly darker overall. Adults have black bills, dark brown eyes, and pale mauve pink legs and feet.

Juveniles differ slightly, with yellow mandibles and gape and pale brown legs. Additionally, they have dark brown upperparts with orange mottling down to the rump and wing coverts, dirty white throats with a scaled appearance, and blackish-brown breasts with pale orange spotting.

The species does not occur alongside any other alethes; the species most similar to it, the white-chested alethe, inhabits northern Malawi, Tanzania, and south-central Mozambique. That species is bigger than the Thyolo alethe and has no white spotting on the tail feathers. The Thyolo alethe can also be confused with the olive-flanked robin-chat, but that species is smaller, with olive-brown upperparts, a greyish supercilium, and no spots on the tail feathers.

== Distribution and habitat ==
The Thyolo alethe is only found on several isolated mountain peaks in southeastern Malawi and northeastern Mozambique at elevations of 950–1,900 m, although locally it can be found from 700–900 m. It was previously more widespread in both countries, but has had its range reduced due to the deforestation of many of the submontane forests it inhabits. A 1983–84 survey of Malawi found the species to be common in all forested habitats at elevations of 1,200 m to 1,700. Currently in Malawi, it is known from the Namizimu Range, the Mangochi Hills, the Chikala Hills, the Zomba and Malosa Mountains, the Shire Highlands, the Thyolo Mountains, and Mount Mulanje. The species has now probably been extirpated from most of the Shire Highlands near Blantyre, and from all of the Thyolo Mountains excepting a few remaining forest fragments in tea estates. In Mozambique, the species is known from Mount Namuli, Mount Mabu, Mount Chiperone, and Mount Inago. On Mount Namuli, the species was formerly common in mid-altitude forest at elevations of 1,200–1,400 m, but this habitat has now been almost entirely destroyed.

The species primarily inhabits the ground layer of submontane and montane forests, especially moist submontane forests at elevations of 1,000–1,700 meters. It prefers tall evergreen forests with no shrubby understory but can sometimes be found in forests with dense undergrowth.

== Behaviour and ecology ==
Largely sedentary, but seasonally migrates on Mount Mulanje, moving to lower elevations near the Ruo River from March to September.

=== Diet ===
Foraging largely takes place on the ground, but can also happen in low vegetation or on tree trunks. The Thyolo alethe feeds on a variety of small invertebrates, including beetles, spiders, and Dorylus driver ants. The species will frequently follow swarms of driver ants to catch prey flushed by these swarms, with up to five birds feeding together near a single swarm. Alethes near swarms will wait on perches, usually below 2 m but sometimes as high up as 15 m, and sally to catch prey. Thyolo alethes are known to feed in flocks alongside Cabanis's greenbul.
