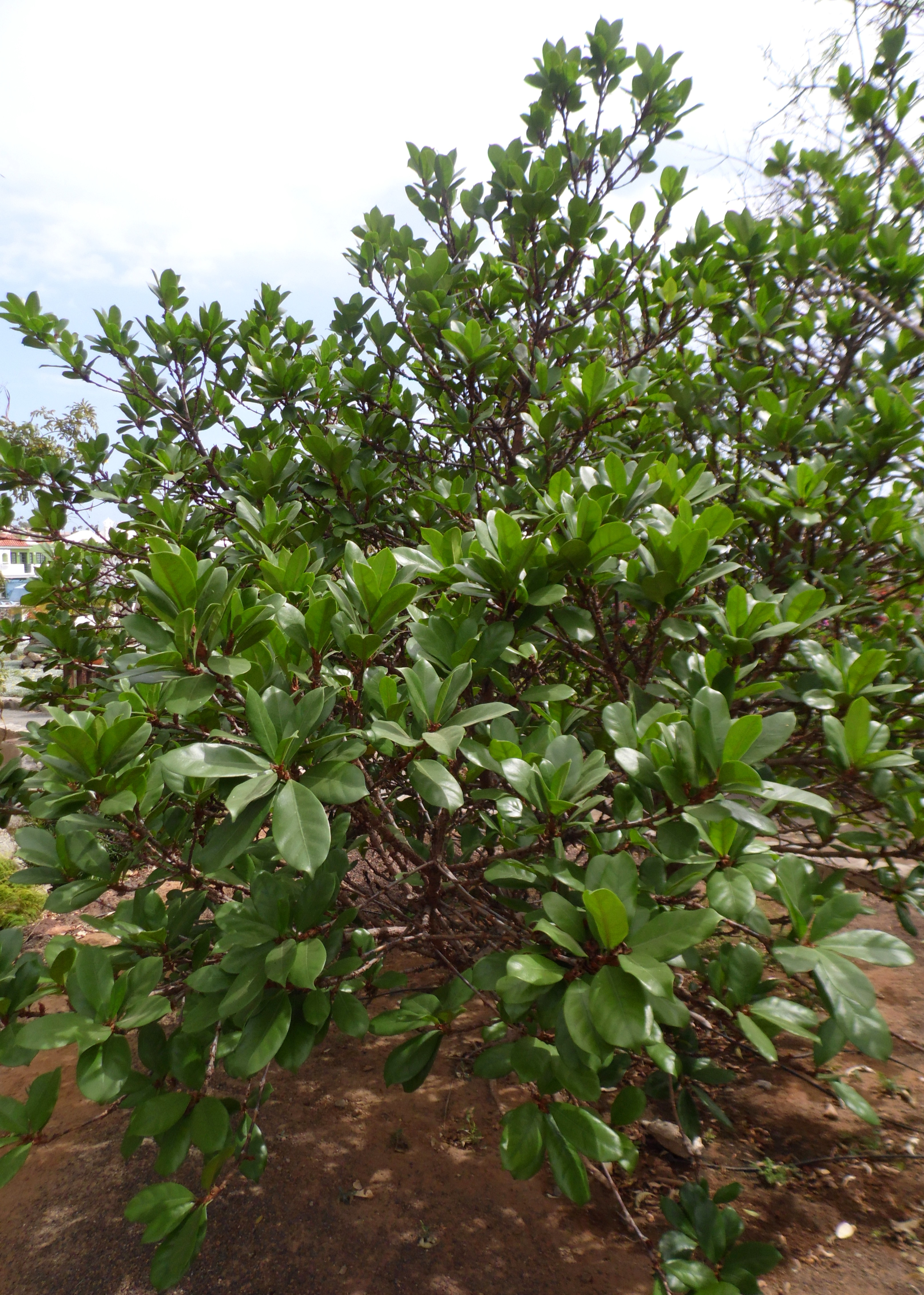
- Specimen in Maspalomas Botanical Garden, Gran Canaria.

Conservation status
- Least Concern (IUCN 3.1)

Scientific classification
- Kingdom: Plantae
- Clade: Tracheophytes
- Clade: Angiosperms
- Clade: Eudicots
- Clade: Rosids
- Order: Rosales
- Family: Moraceae
- Genus: Ficus
- Subgenus: F. subg. Urostigma
- Species: F. cyathistipula

Binomial name
- Ficus cyathistipula Warb.

Subspecies
- Ficus cyathistipula subsp. cyathistipula; Ficus cyathistipula subsp. pringsheimiana (J.Braun & K.Schum.) C.C.Berg

Synonyms
- synonyms of subsp. cyathistipula: Ficus callescens Hiern; Ficus nyanzensis Hutch.; Ficus rederi Hutch.; Ficus rhynchocarpa Warb. ex Mildbr. & Burret; synonyms of subsp. pringsheimiana: Ficus pringsheimiana J.Braun & K.Schum.

= Ficus cyathistipula =

Tropical African fig tree

''Ficus cyathistipula'', the African fig tree, is a species of fig that is native to the tropical forest regions of Africa. They may be small trees, shrubs or hemi-epiphytic lianas, and are widespread in the moist tropics, where they may be found in Afromontane or rainforest, often overhanging pools. The figs are reddish when ripe, and have thick, spongy walls that enable them to float on water. They are named for their cup-shaped (cyathus-) and persistent stipules (stipula).

== Range and habitat ==
It ranges from the Ivory Coast in the west, to western Kenya and northern Malawi in the east. In the south it occurs in northern Angola, northern Zambia, and at Mount Namuli in Zambezia, Mozambique. They grow beside forested streams or rivers, or in swamps where they overhang pools, and on inselbergs and rock outcrops, from sea level to 1,800 m.

== Description ==
Ficus cyathistipula is an evergreen tree, growing to 5 metres (16 ft) in height. It has dark and flaky bark. The trunk is thin and branches readily, and may form adventitious roots for support.

The dark, glabrous and leathery leaves are up to 7 cm wide and some 20 cm long. Their venation is limited to some 5 to 8 lateral nerves. The leaves are ovoid to oblanceolate and blunt towards the tip, except near the leaf spine. They are arranged in a spiral, on petioles of up to 4 cm long.

The globose syconia (i.e. figs) grow solitary or up to three together in leaf axils, on peduncles of up to 2.5 cm long, or may be sessile. They measure up to 5 cm in diameter and are initially greenish yellow to whitish, and flecked pale yellow, but ripen to a reddish colour.

=== Subspecies ===
Subspecies include:

- Ficus cyathistipula subsp. cyathistipula Warburg 1894 — tropical Africa
- Ficus cyathistipula subsp. pringsheimiana (Braun & K. Schum.) C.C. Berg 1988 — endemic to West African lowland rainforests.

== Species associations ==
Ficus cyathistipula subsp. cyathistipula is pollinated by Agaon fasciatum Waterston.. Ficus cyathistipula subsp. pringsheimiana, which is endemic to West African lowland rainforests in Cameroon and Gabon, is pollinated by the wasp Agaon kiellandi Wiebes..
