= Alethe =

Alethe may refer to:

- Alethe (genus), a genus of birds in the family Muscicapidae
- Birds of the genus Chamaetylas (formerly included in the genus Alethe)
