= Battle of Lioma =

Battle during the First World War

- Part of East African Campaign of World War I
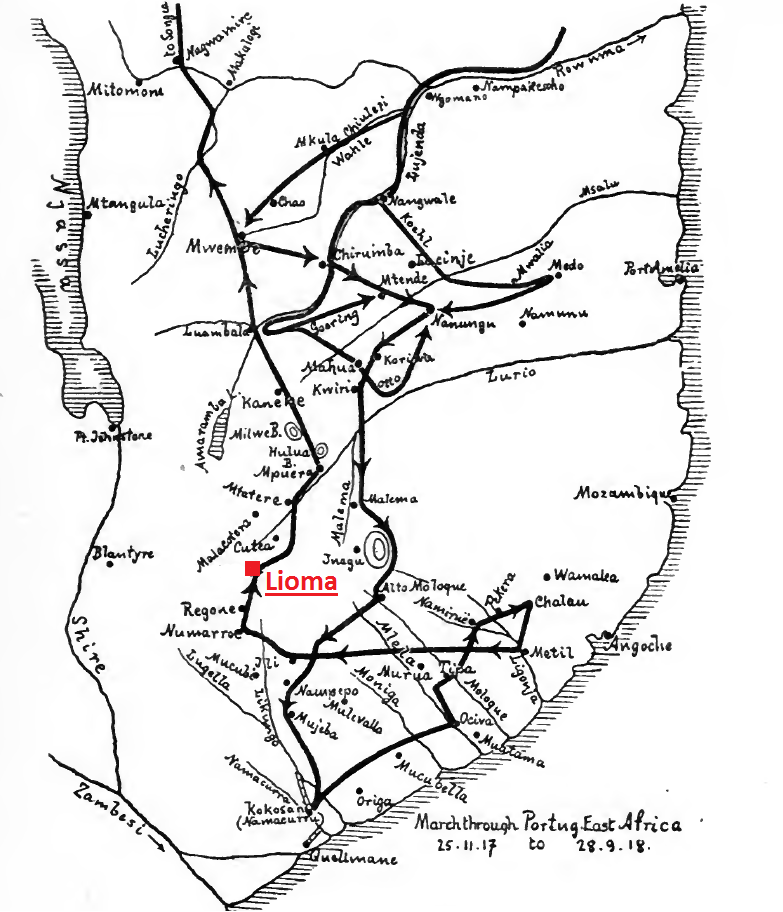
- Lioma during the Mozambique Campaign.
Date	30–31 August 1918
Location	Lioma, Portuguese East Africa (present-day Mozambique) 15°10′30″S 36°48′12″E
Result	See Aftermath section

Belligerents
German Empire: German East Africa	United Kingdom and Empire: Nyasaland

Commanders and leaders
(German Empire) Gen. Maj. Paul von Lettow-Vorbeck (German Empire) Gen. Maj. Kurt Wahle (German Empire) Hptm. Karl Göring (WIA) (German Empire) Hptm. Erich Müller (German Empire) Hptm. Max Poppe (WIA) (German Empire) Hptm. Paul Stemmermann	(British Empire) Lt-Col George Giffard (British Empire) Lt-Col Charles Phillips (British Empire) Maj Alexander Masters (WIA) (British Empire) Capt Stanley John

Units involved
Schutztruppe: Abt Göring: 2. FK, 3. or 13. FK; 3. SchK; Abt Müller: 9. FK, 3. or 13. FK; 4. SchK; Abt Poppe: 11. FK; 6. SchK; Abt Stemmermann: 10. FK, 14. FK; Main body/baggage escort: 4. FK, 17. FK, 21. FK	(British Empire) King's African Rifles: Lioma garrison: 1/1st KAR; KAR Second Column ("KARTUCOL"): 1/2nd KAR, 2/2nd KAR, 3/2nd KAR

Strength
1,600+	c. 3,000

Casualties and losses
29 killed, 27 wounded, 34 missing, 5 captured (German claim); 222 killed, missing or captured (British claim)	32 killed, 59 wounded, 15 missing among 1/1st KAR; casualties of other British battalions unreported
- Location within Mozambique Battle of Lioma (Africa)

The Battle of Lioma (30–31 August 1918) was fought between the German Empire and British Empire during the East African Campaign of World War I. Having successfully evaded the Allies since late 1917, the German Schutztruppe under Paul von Lettow-Vorbeck waged a guerilla campaign in Portuguese East Africa, attacking and raiding settlements as well as forts in the search of supplies while inflicting as much damage as possible on the Allies. All the while, the Schutztruppe was chased by the British King's African Rifles, which finally cornered the Germans at the village of Lioma on 30–31 August 1918. Led by George Giffard, the British forces almost managed to encircle and destroy the Schutztruppe, but in the end the Germans broke out and successfully retreated. Although greatly weakened by the fighting at Lioma, the Schutztruppe was thus able to remain active until the end of the war.

== Background ==
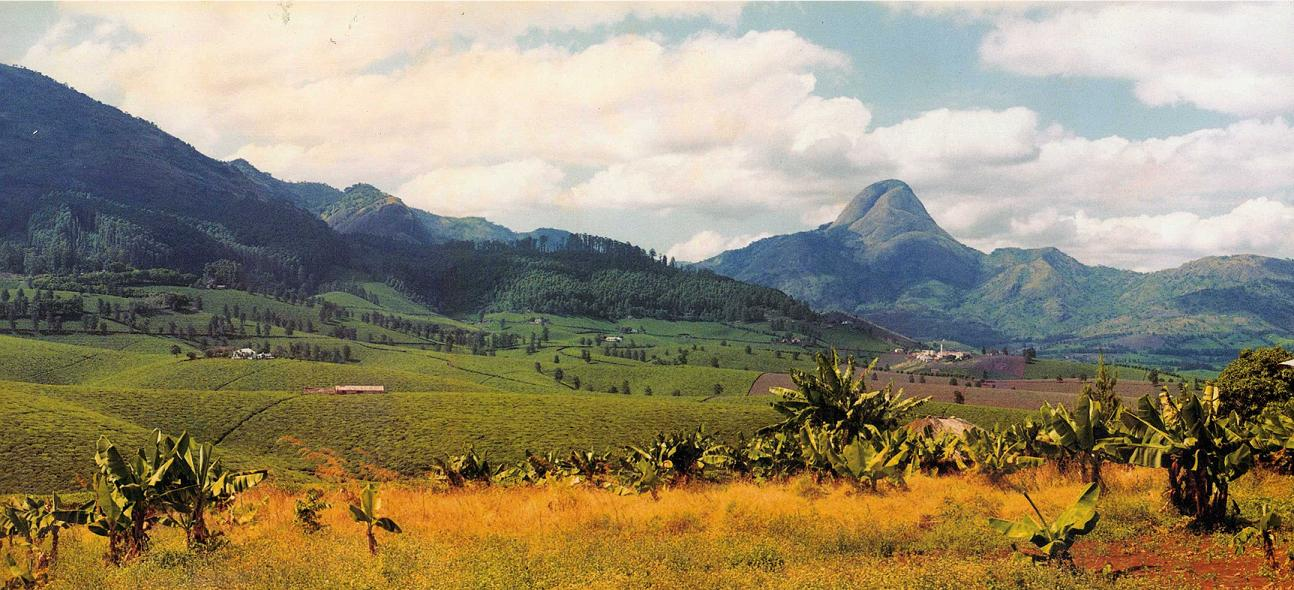
This picture shows the terrain around Gurúè, which is similar to that of Lioma. Lioma is located in a valley, surrounded by tall hills, often with steep slopes and cliffs. At the time of the battle, the highlands around Lioma were covered by dense bush interspersed with trees, making it an extremely difficult battlefield environment.

After suffering heavy casualties throughout 1917 and being unable to hold territory in German East Africa any longer, Lettow-Vorbeck decided to invade Portuguese East Africa in hopes of acquiring sufficient supplies to continue the war. In this he was successful: While the German troops were able to forage food by plundering the countryside, the Schutztruppe defeated the Portuguese colonial and metropolitan forces several times, most notably during the Battle of Ngomano, thereby capturing large quantities of weapons, ammunition and medical supplies from the enemy. Historian Gregg Adams even comments that the Portuguese became "the unwilling quartermasters for the Schutztruppe". With the Portuguese proving unable to defeat the German forces, the British had to bear the brunt of the fighting in Mozambique, and thus began to aggressively pursue Lettow-Vorbeck's small army.

By August 1918, the Schutztruppe was heading north to return to German East Africa, while the British under Jacob van Deventer had begun to concentrate their forces in the area of Regone and Lioma in an attempt to encircle their enemy. Though Lettow-Vorbeck had received intel about the British plans, his forces were once again in dire need of supplies and Regone harbored a large supply depot. As result, the German commander planned a quick assault against the vulnerable village in order to capture as many supplies as possible: Speed was crucial for this plan, as Lettow-Vorbeck would have to outrace the British before they could reinforce Regone or catch up with him. Rough terrain, rain and fog hindered and delayed the Schutztruppe, however, so that when it reached Regone on 26 August, the British had already fortified and reinforced it. At this point, the Germans could only have taken Regone by a prolonged siege for which they had no time, so that Lettow-Vorbeck chose to call off the attack. His forces bypassed Regone and instead began to march to Lioma, another supply depot. Unknown to the Germans, a British battalion (1/1st KAR) already managed to reinforce the village on 28 August, while two other battalions also force-marched toward Lioma. Between the British forces at Regone and the units that gathered at Lioma the Schutztruppe would be trapped, and if everything went according to van Deventer's plans, destroyed.

While British skirmishers harassed the approaching German forces, the 1/1st KAR under Maj Alexander Charles Masters dug in at Lioma: They formed a square defensive perimeter south of the village, and three small platoon outposts were also set up west, east and south of the British positions. Thus prepared, the Lioma garrison waited for the Schutztruppe, which would arrive in the area on 30 August.

== Opposing forces ==
=== Germans ===
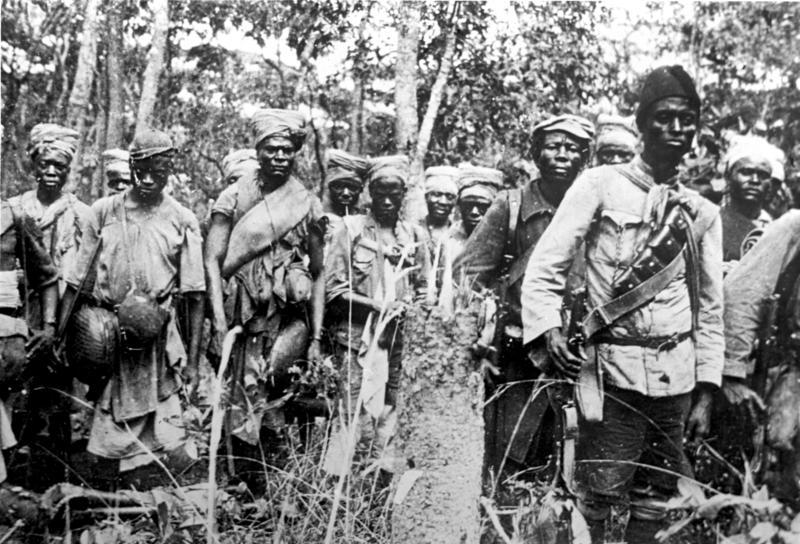
Schutztruppe askaris and carriers late into the war, when there was little uniformity left among the depleted and exhausted German forces, who had make do with whatever equipment, clothing and supplies they could capture.

By 1918, the once strong Schutztruppe, which had successfully resisted the allies for four years, was much depleted and exhausted. Of its peak strength of around 15,000 soldiers in 1916 just about 1,600 were left. Many African as well as European soldiers had deserted or surrendered as the allies overran their home areas in German East Africa, wages were no longer paid, and life in the army became harder and more brutal. Many of the soldiers also became unfit for combat due to the extreme food shortages and disease under which the Schutztruppe suffered. Driven from their territory and unable to regularly recruit or train new soldiers, manpower shortages among the common soldiers were severe, (Note: The only way for the Germans to tackle manpower shortages among the infantry was to either draft largely unreliable locals in Mozambique into the force or to arm the carriers who had come with the Schutztruppe from German East Africa. The latter, mostly Wamanyema and Wasukuma, actually proved to be mostly loyal and reliable throughout the campaign.) while officers and NCOs became irreplaceable. This was particularly problematic because the Schutztruppe's ability to continue to function as coherent, effective fighting force largely rested upon its experienced and capable leadership. (Note: Both European and native officers and NCOs of the Schutztruppe were generally well-trained veterans, who were expected to lead by example at the frontline. While this behaviour helped them to gain the loyalty of their soldiers and much practical knowledge, the officers and NCOs in the Schutztruppe also consequently suffered heavy casualties. As result, Lettow-Vorbeck attempted to preserve them as much as possible during the Mozambique campaign, even though he regularly clashed with his subordinates due to his often ruthless behavior and tactics.)

Nevertheless, most of the black soldiers who had already served since before the war were still staunchly loyal to Lettow-Vorbeck by 1918, with their fighting spirit and morale remaining largely unshaken. Even though they suffered from exhaustion, poor supplies, hunger, excessive heat or cold, and an increasingly experienced and stubborn opponent in form of the King's African Rifles during the fighting in Portuguese East Africa, these core cadres refused to give up – be it out of loyalty to their comrades, economic self-interest, desire for revenge, or sheer will to survive. (Note: To be left behind or to desert in Mozambique often meant death for Schutztruppe soldiers, as the local civilians generally murdered soldiers from all sides due to the deprivations the armies visited upon them. Nevertheless, living conditions sometimes became so unbearable for individual black and white German soldiers that they committed suicide.) Battle-hardened, experienced in mobile bush-warfare, and possessed by a strong esprit de corps after years of warfare, they still constituted a force to be reckoned with. Lettow-Vorbeck himself would judge after the Battle of Lioma that his men had fought "brilliantly" in face of the odds. Willpower alone could not substitute for adequate supplies and reinforcements, however, so that the Schutztruppe's effective combat power had still much declined by 1918, and the Germans could no longer meet strong enemy formations head-on without risking their own destruction.

=== British ===
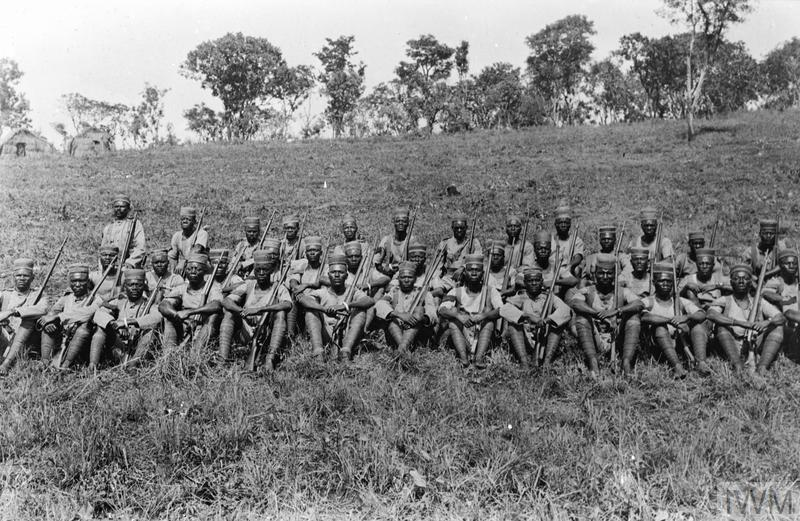
King's African Rifles soldiers rest near Mssindyi, German East Africa, September 1917.

The British soldiers that faced the Schutztruppe at Lioma were part of the King's African Rifles (KAR), a long neglected branch of the British colonial forces. Having proven themselves to be among the most effective opponents of the Schutztruppe, the KAR were drastically expanded, strengthened and reorganized after 1915. Their tactics and strategies were adapted to the mobile German bush warfare, and better equipment and weaponry was given to the British askaris. Unlike the Germans, whose supply and recruitment prospects deteriorated as the war went on, the KAR could replenish its ranks. (Note: The methods to enlist new soldiers employed by the KAR also involved deceiving potential aspirants. Many Malawian soldiers, who formed the bulk of the British troops at Lioma, later recollected that they were goaded into volunteering by being told that they would not serve at the frontlines. There were others, however, who were eager to join battle, knowing "that if they survived they would return home comparatively rich, able to marry well, and respected (or even envied)". Especially among the Yao of Nyasaland, disproportionately many young men enlisted into the KAR.) The massive expansion of the KAR meant, however, that most of its troops were fresh recruits and thus inferior in experience to the hardened Schutztruppe. At Lioma, for example, the 1/1st KAR mostly consisted of recent recruits from Nyasaland (modern-day Malawi) formed around a cadre of veterans. Furthermore, the extremely poor quality or non-existence of roads in Mozambique greatly hindered the supply of the large numbers of KAR soldiers who chased the small Schutztruppe. As result, both British white officers as well as askaris had to live off the land and often were, just like their German counterparts, near starvation. In one case, when "the officers and men [of one unit] were inspected at the end of their stint in the field they were described as resembling the victims of famine. Their experience of the hardships of war in East Africa was typical, not exceptional."

"Colonel Gifford [sic.] himself, an efficient and tireless soldier, expected his officers and men to be the same. Cool and collected in any engagement, he was, as I have said, with his column, our one redeeming feature in this 1918 campaign in P.E.A. (...) without Colonel Gifford [sic.] and the K.A.R. 2nd Col. it might easily have been almost disastrous."

— An Australian scout during the East African Campaign about George Giffard.

Despite these adverse conditions, the British native soldiers generally proved themselves to be tenacious and very capable fighters, motivated by a variety of reasons, most of them rooted in traditional African concepts of loyalty and their comparably high wages. The white and black officers and NCOs of the King's African Rifles also led by example and like their Schutztruppe counterparts suffered heavy losses, though unlike the Germans the British could relatively quickly replace them. New British white officers often could not speak Swahili (the regional lingua franca), however, hindering communications with their men.

One of the most important British commanders during the operations in Mozambique was Lt-Col George Giffard; leading a brigade (K.A.R. 2nd Col. or "KARTUCOL") specifically to find and destroy Lettow-Vorbeck's remaining troops, he was highly regarded by both his own forces and respected by the Germans. His troops would relieve the Lioma garrison on the battle's second day.

== Battle ==
=== Engagement at Lioma (30 August) ===
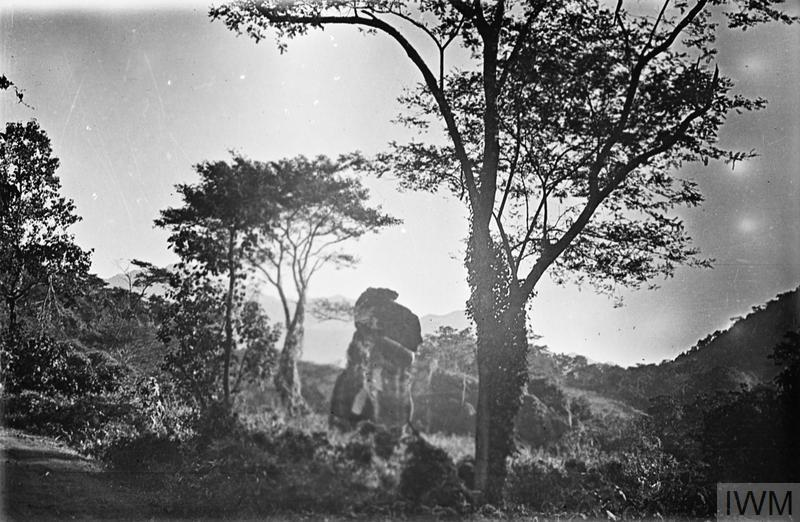
Dense bush such as seen here greatly hindered visibility at Lioma and concealed enemies, thus making it necessary for the 1/1st KAR to set up vulnerable outposts and sent out scouts in order to prevent the Schutztruppe from surprising them.

The Schutztruppe arrived at area surrounding Lioma on 30 August. The British forces at Lioma had noticed the German approach hours before the latter's arrival, and thus could strengthen their defenses accordingly. Indeed, as the German columns (Abteilungen, short: Abt) advanced on the village, one of the relief units, namely 3/2nd KAR under Lt-Col Charles George Phillips, arrived around 12:00 and deployed north-east of 1/1st main position at Lioma.

While the newly arrived battalion was deploying, the Schutztruppe's vanguard, formed by Abt Müller, encountered a detached platoon of 1/1 KAR east of Lioma, resulting in a first skirmish, whereupon the leading soldiers of Abt Müller retreated southwards. When Lettow-Vorbeck learned of this firefight, he incorrectly assessed that the British had not yet fortified their positions due to the minimal defenses of the encountered forward outpost. Believing that the enemy positions were still vulnerable, he consequently ordered Abt Göring and Abt Müller to flank 1/1st KAR's main position, while Abt Poppe was sent against and overran the British outpost around 14:30. An attempt by the British to relieve the detached platoon failed, though Hptm. Poppe was seriously wounded during the British counter-attack. As result of the German encirclement movement, communication between 1/1st and 3/2nd KAR was severed.

Around 16:30, the Germans launched their determined attack on 1/1st KAR's main position with around 1,000 men and 30 machine guns. The assault began with Abt Müller attacking from the east and north, followed by Abt Poppe from the south. At the same time, 3/2nd KAR launched a number of counter-attacks against the Germans, capturing Abt Müller's baggage and reserve ammunition, and blocking Abt Göring's attempt to also flank 1/1st KAR. Unable to advance further, Hptm. Karl Göring consequently ordered part of his force to oppose 3/2nd KAR, while the rest charged 1/1 KAR's western perimeter. The vigorous, unnerving German attacks scattered 1/1 KAR's carriers and caused many casualties, among them several senior officers of the battalion killed or wounded, including Major Masters, who had to be replaced by Captain Stanley Conway John as commanding officer of 1/1 KAR. Nevertheless, the 1/1st KAR's askari held firm and reportedly displayed "excellent" shooting. One small German group actually succeeded in breaking into the northwestern corner of the British defensive square, but they were quickly killed. The Schutztruppe continued its attacks until 22:30, when the mounting casualties among his troops led Göring to the conclusion that a continued engagement was futile, whereupon he ordered a withdrawal. The German units subsequently retreated south to rejoin the rest of their forces.

=== Escape of the Schutztruppe (31 August) ===
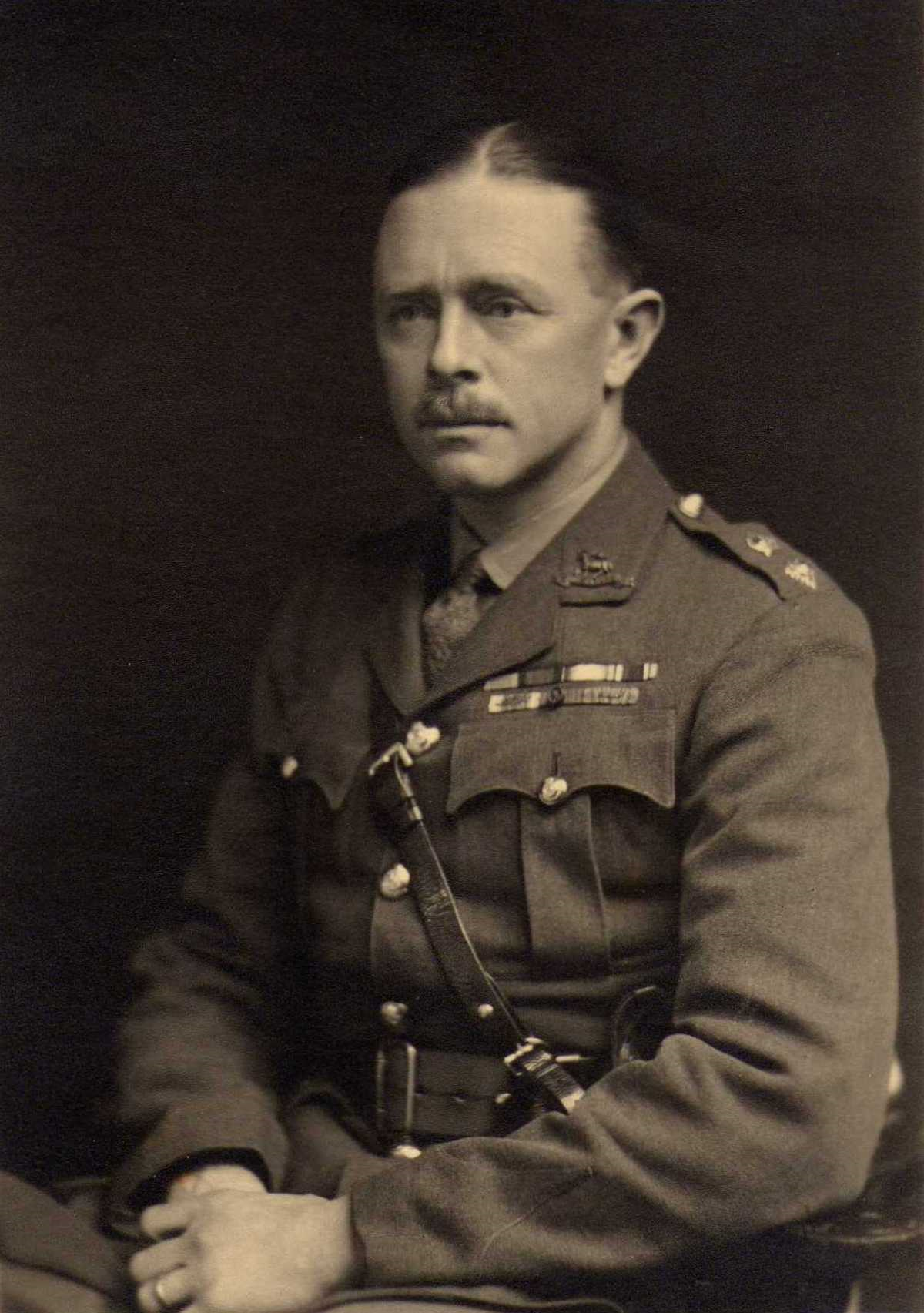
Lieutenant colonel George Giffard, whose attempt to encircle and destroy the Schutztruppe were hindered by the terrain and reluctance of 1/2nd KAR to press the attack.

In course of the following night, Lettow-Vorbeck came to the conclusion that his forces had to escape Lioma toward the east; he knew that the Schutztruppe needed a respite and that more enemy units were converging on his position. On the other side, 2/2nd KAR had reached Lioma, while 1/2nd KAR was closing in on the Nalume River crossing to the village's east; thus, by early 31 August, three British battalions were in the vicinity of Lioma, with a fourth marching to blockade the most important eastern escape route. Lt-Col Giffard, who had arrived with 2/2nd KAR and now took command over all present British forces, consequently saw a good opportunity to finally encircle and crush the Schutztruppe.

The German forces began to move northeast towards the Lioma-Muanhupa road at 09:00 on 31 August, after regrouping during the night. In order to speed up their advance, they left behind seriously wounded and sick Schutztruppe personnel as well as prisoners. These were later captured by the British. The German vanguard was once again formed by the columns of Müller and Göring, the main body was led by Gen. Maj. Kurt Wahle, while Hptm. Stemmermann was left in charge of the rearguard. Lettow-Vorbeck would freely move through the force to oversee its advance and take command wherever he was most needed. Even though they sent out patrols to learn about the Schutztruppe's location throughout the night, the British only received reports about Lettow-Vorbeck's movement at 10:00. Thereupon Giffard ordered 2/2nd KAR and half of 3/2nd KAR to move eastwards, and 1/2nd KAR to march west in order to engage and encircle the German forces between them. 1/1st KAR, badly shaken by the previous day's fighting, was to remain at Lioma to guard the British baggage and reserve ammunition, while the other half of 3/2nd KAR was held as mobile reserve.

Two companies of 2/2nd KAR came up against the German vanguard's flank on the Lioma-Muanhupa road around 12:00, immediately starting a stubborn, but stagnant firefight with Abt Müller and Abt Göring. Other elements of the 2/2nd and 3/2nd KAR attempted to flank this vanguard and attack the German main body in order to scatter its carriers and capture its supplies, which would have meant a heavy logistical blow for the Schutztruppe. Well covered by the bush and the rugged hills, however, the German main body evaded the British to the west and managed to move eastwards along the road, and then on a trail into the northern hills. After encountering 2/2nd and 3/2nd KAR, Lettow-Vorbeck initially assumed that he could possibly destroy them with a determined counter-attack using all his forces; this plan was dropped, however, when it became clear that the German main body had already too far advanced northwards to be called back for an assault. Meanwhile, unknown to the Germans, 1/2nd KAR marched southwest along the Lioma-Muanhupa road, and encountered parts of the Schutztruppe's rearguard by 14:30. Completely surprising the defenders, 1/2nd KAR managed to overrun a whole enemy field hospital largely unopposed. Hindered in its advance only by a few snipers, 1/2nd KAR then moved into the northern hills, where the German main body and the remaining rearguard were located, and promptly came under machine gun fire. This only briefly halted the King's African Rifles soldiers, and overall the German rearguard offered only light resistance to 1/2nd KAR until it was forced to retreat northwards in disorder around 15:00.

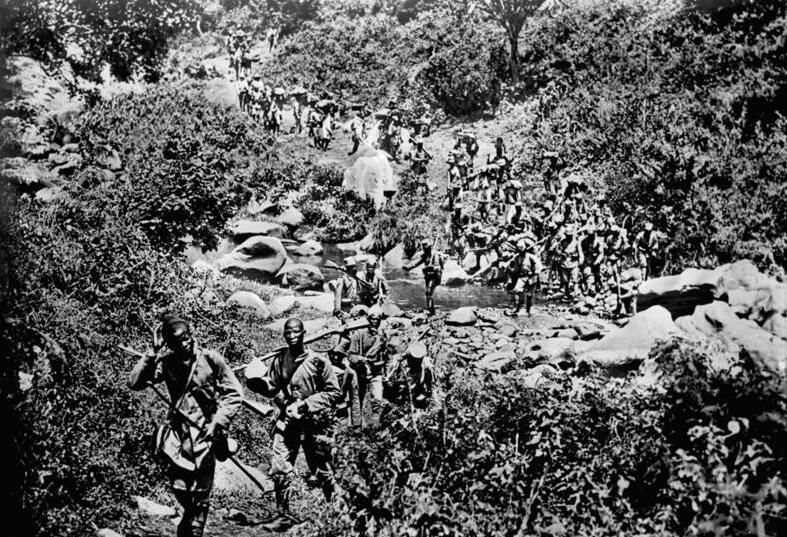
The Schutztruppe on the march. Difficult terrain such as seen here could greatly hinder effective operations, as it was the case at Lioma.

While this was happening, Lettow-Vorbeck had already ordered his western units to retreat after Hptm. Göring was wounded. Having lost several officers and NCOs on the battle's first day, he could simply risk no more casualties among them. As there was almost no communication possible between the different detachments due to the problematic terrain, Lettow-Vorbeck noticed the attack on his rearguard units only when he had begun to ascend the northern hills with the withdrawing Abt Göring and Abt Müller. By then it had become too late for the German commander to make contact with or aid the now beleaguered forces of Stemmermann and Wahle.

That the Germans did not suffer more casualties among their rearguard was thanks to the false reports of captured German askaris, who massively exaggerated the Schutztruppe's remaining strength when being questioned by 1/2nd KAR. Thus discouraged, the latter stopped its pursuit of the Germans, regrouped, and only resumed to cautiously advance at 16:00. The British forces coming from the east and west finally met around 17:00, by which all German units had managed to successfully escape northwards. Due to the difficult terrain, however, the communications between the retreating Schutztruppe forces had "become hopelessly muddled" and order had also largely broken down: The western vanguard units, attempting to climb the steep northern granite hills, had become lost, while the situation among the main body was also chaotic. Only late into the night was Lettow-Vorbeck, who was still with Abt Müller and Abt Göring, able to reestablish contact and eventually reunite with the main body under Wahle. One German detachment under Hptm. Köhl even became so completely lost that it was only able to reunite with the rest of the Schutztruppe after several days.

== Aftermath ==
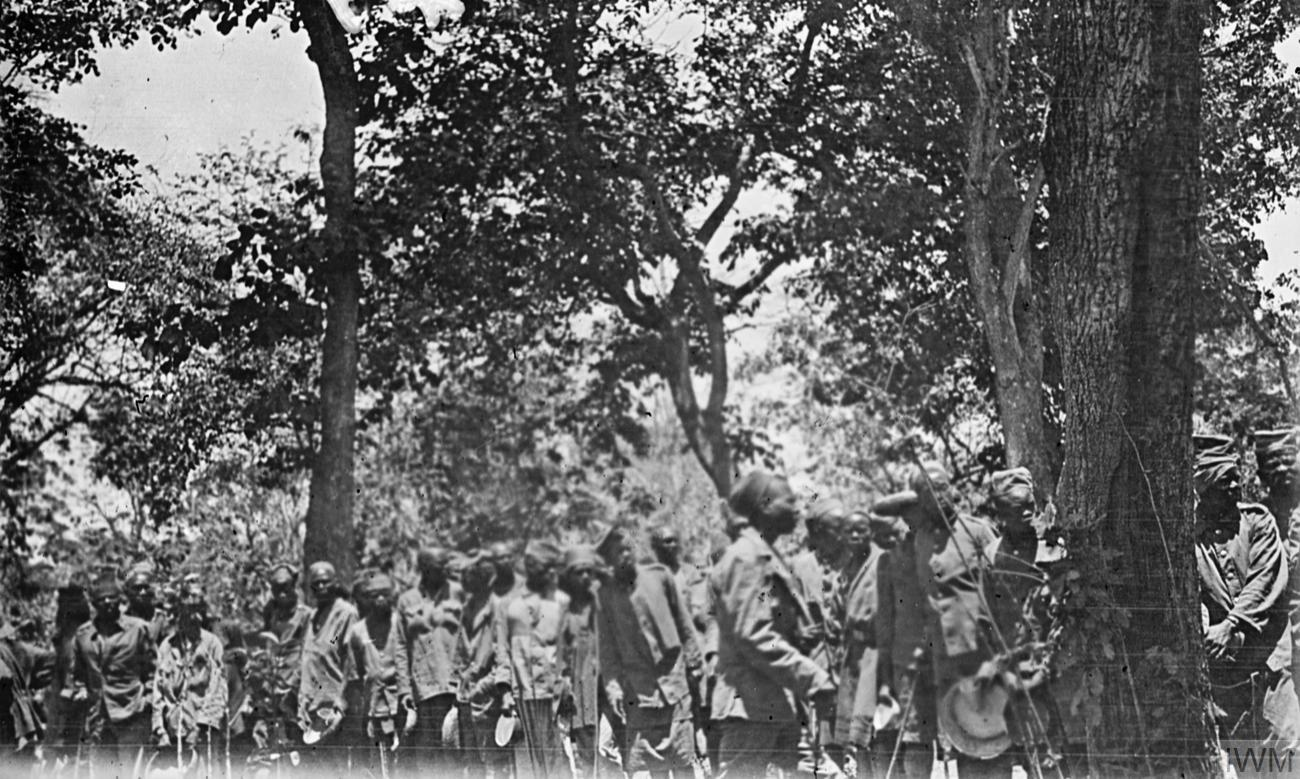
Captured Schutztruppe soldiers wait for their rations at a prisoner-of-war camp. The Germans suffered heavy casualties at Lioma, though Lettow-Vorbeck's force nevertheless remained active.

While the British had failed to finally crush the Schutztruppe, they had inflicted heavy casualties on the Germans, though the actual number of losses is disputed. Lettow-Vorbeck claimed that he had lost 29 killed, 27 wounded, 34 missing, and 5 captured, while British claims are around 222 killed, missing or captured, of whom 22–26 were Whites. These differences may stem from the Germans not counting non-combatants such as medical personnel as casualties. Regardless of the exact numbers, several of the Schutztruppe's irreplaceable senior officers and NCOs were killed, captured or wounded, which was a heavy blow.

The Germans had also failed in taking Lioma and thus could not replenish their supplies; instead, they had lost 50,000 rounds of ammunition, crucial medical stores, and around 200 carriers, who had been scattered in course of the battle. Miller judged that "the Germans had been more than bruised at Lioma; but for the almost total disorder and confusion [on both sides] that marked the two-day action, they would have been wiped out." Edward Paice calls the battle of Lioma a "narrow escape" for the Germans. Taken together with their casualties during the Battle of Pere Hills, another "near thing" soon after Lioma, Lettow-Vorbeck's forces lost 15% of their combat strength. Many of those wounded at Lioma did not recover enough to be combat-ready again; among them was Göring.

Furthermore, a lung epidemic broke out among the Schutztruppe in September 1918, further reducing the Germans' manpower and undermining their morale. Many of the surviving white Germans increasingly began to question Lettow-Vorbeck's intention to continue fighting for what they perceived as lost cause. Nevertheless, the Schutztruppe did not surrender, and resumed their march northwards. After Pere Hills, it travelled the remaining distance to German East Africa largely unopposed, and would, albeit greatly reduced in strength and numbers, continue to stay in action until the end of the war.

For the British, Lioma had been "the best chance [...] to inflict a decisive defeat upon the Schutztruppe". Lt-Col Giffard subsequently attributed the failure to encircle the Germans to the difficult communications between the British units and the missing information about enemy troop movements, this being "the difficulty which is always the same in the Bush of getting information accurately and quickly". The British casualties at Lioma were mostly unreported; it is only known that 1/1st KAR suffered 32 killed, 59 wounded, and 15 missing. After the battle four Distinguished Conduct Medals were awarded to European, and seven African Distinguished Conduct Medals to African soldiers of the 1/1st and 1/2nd KAR for gallantry, while the Distinguished Service Order was awarded to the commanders of 1/1st KAR (Alexander Charles Masters), 1/2 KAR (Edward Beckford Bevan) and 3/2 KAR (Charles George Phillips).

== Bibliography ==
- Abbott, Peter (2009) [1st pub.:2002]. Armies in East Africa 1914–18 (8th ed.). Oxford: Osprey Publishing.
- Adams, Gregg (2016). King's African Rifles Soldier vs Schutztruppe Soldier. East Africa 1917–18. Oxford: Osprey Publishing. ISBN 978-1-4728-1327-5.
- Strachan, Hew (2004). The First World War in Africa. Oxford: Oxford University Press. ISBN 978-0199257287.
- Miller, Charles (1974). Battle for the Bundu. The First World War in East Africa. New York City: Macmillan Publishing. ISBN 0-02-584930-1.
- Paice, Edward (2008). Tip & Run. The Untold Tragedy of the Great War in Africa. London: Orion Publishing Group. ISBN 978-0-7538-2349-1.
- Lettow-Vorbeck, Paul Emil von (1920). My reminiscences of East Africa. London: Hurst & Blackett, Paternoster House.
- Moyd, Michelle R. (2014). Violent Intermediaries. African Soldiers, Conquest, and Everyday Colonialism in German East Africa. Athens, Ohio: Ohio University Press. ISBN 978-0-8214-2089-8.
- Page, Melvin (1980). "Malawians and the Great War: Oral History in Reconstructing Africa's Recent Past". The Oral History Review. 8. Oxford: Oxford University Press: 49–61. doi:10.1093/ohr/8.1.49.
- Moyse-Bartlett, H. (2012). The King's African Rifles - Volume 1. A Study in the military history of East and Central Africa, 1890–1945. Luton: Andrews UK Limited. ISBN 978-1-78150-661-5.
- Bührer, Tanja (2011). Die Kaiserliche Schutztruppe für Deutsch-Ostafrika. Koloniale Sicherheitspolitik und transkulturelle Kriegsführung 1885 bis 1918 [The imperial Schutztruppe of German East Africa. Colonial military policy and transcultural warfare 1885 to 1918] (in German). Munich: R. Oldenbourg Verlag. ISBN 978-3-486-70442-6.
