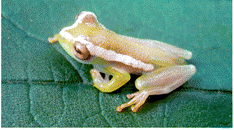

Conservation status
- Vulnerable (IUCN 3.1)

Scientific classification
- Kingdom: Animalia
- Phylum: Chordata
- Class: Amphibia
- Order: Anura
- Family: Hyperoliidae
- Genus: Hyperolius
- Species: H. spinigularis

Binomial name
- Hyperolius spinigularis Stevens, 1971

= Hyperolius spinigularis =

Species of frog

Hyperolius spinigularis is a species of frog in the family Hyperoliidae. It is found in the Mulanje Massif in southern Malawi and the Namuli Massif in adjacent Mozambique. Records from Tanzania refers to other species. Males of this species have characteristic small spines during the breeding season. Its common names are spiny-throated reed frog, spiny reed frog, and Mulanje reed frog.

== Taxonomy ==
Hyperolius spinigularis was described in 1971 based on the type series collected in Malawi, although it was already then noted that "a rather similar frog" had been collected in Tanzania. Subsequent research established a broad distribution in Tanzania, Malawi, and Mozambique, although there were doubts whether all populations represented just a single species. Molecular genetic analyses published in 2015 confirmed that the Tanzanian populations represented species different from H. spinigularis and resulted in restricting this species to Malawi and Mozambique. The new species, previously confused with H. spinigularis, are Hyperolius burgessi, Hyperolius davenporti, and Hyperolius ukwiva.

== Description ==
Males measure 19–23 mm (0.75–0.91 in) and females 24–31 mm (0.94–1.22 in) in snout–vent length. In addition to sexual dimorphism in size, males can be distinguished during the breeding season by the presence of prominent black asperities (spines) that cover the throat, mentum, abdomen, and undersurfaces of the hind limbs. The head is broad and has protruding eyes; the pupil is horizontally elliptic. All females and most males are pale apple-green and dorsally covered with minute brown chromatophores that under certain light conditions can almost mask the ground colouration. The ventrum is a pale translucent blue-green, becoming silvery white over the abdomen and an opaque blue-green on the gular disc. The hands and feet are pale yellow. However, a small fraction of males have red-brown ground coloration on both the dorsum and ventrum, with the extremities of the limbs being pale red. Also the pale cream or white dorsal patterning is variable but unrelated to sex. A white cantho-dorso-lateral band is the most common type, while some individuals have only an irregular and often broken dorso-lateral band, as well as a sub-triangular frontal patch.

Newly metamorphosed froglets measure 12.7–14.1 mm (0.50–0.56 in) SVL.

== Ecology and behaviour ==
The breeding season is short, from late December to mid March, during the last rains. Males appear on the breeding sites before females. Vocalization were not observed in the natural habitat, even though captive males were occasionally observed to vocalize. The eggs are deposited on leaves above water. One female was observed to return to her eggs and to eject watery fluid over the egg mass from her vent.

Hibernation has been observed in captive specimens. Prior to hibernation, frogs lose interest on food and become less active, before finally concealing themselves among the roots of grasses near the waterline. They position themselves head uppermost, often with the hind parts touching the water or even partly submerged. This behaviour has not been observed in the field, but its timing in captive specimens coincides with the disappearance of frogs from their breeding sites in the wild.

== Habitat and conservation ==
Hyperolius spinigularis occurs in forest and dambo habitats at elevations of 690–1,250 m (2,260–4,100 ft) above sea level. Breeding takes place in seasonal and permanent pools.

The species is relatively common in Malawi; its abundance in Mozambique is unknown. It is affected by large-scale habitat loss caused by deforestation and agricultural expansion, including the use of fire for habitat conversion. The International Union for Conservation of Nature (IUCN) has assessed it as "Vulnerable".
