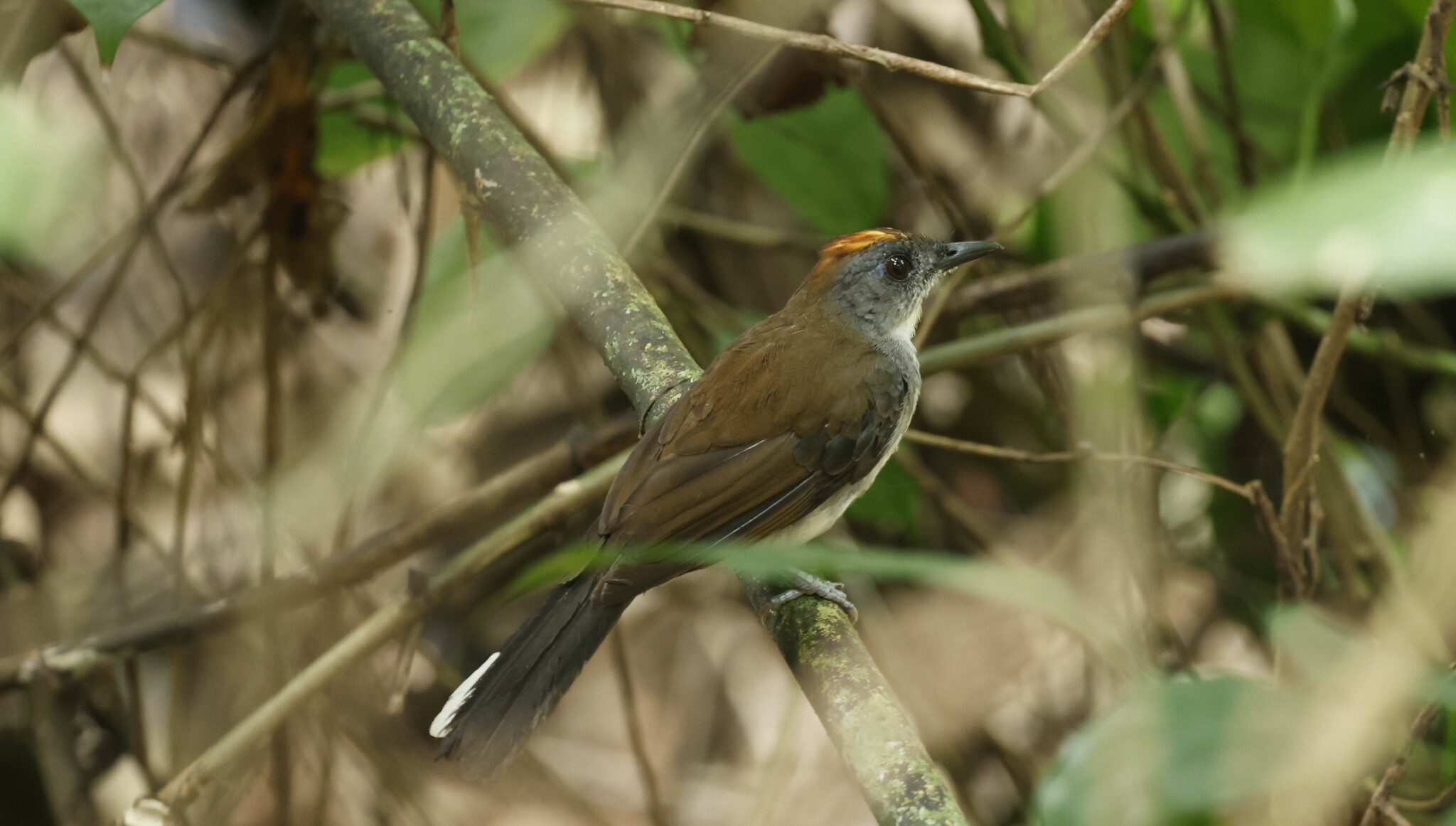

Conservation status
- Least Concern (IUCN 3.1)

Scientific classification
- Kingdom: Animalia
- Phylum: Chordata
- Class: Aves
- Order: Passeriformes
- Family: Muscicapidae
- Genus: Alethe
- Species: A. diademata

Binomial name
- Alethe diademata (Bonaparte, 1850)

= White-tailed alethe =

Species of bird

The white-tailed alethe (Alethe diademata) is a species of bird in the Old World flycatcher family Muscicapidae. It is found in western Africa from Senegal to Togo. Its natural habitat is subtropical or tropical moist lowland forests.

It was recently split into two species from the fire-crested alethe (A. castanea).
