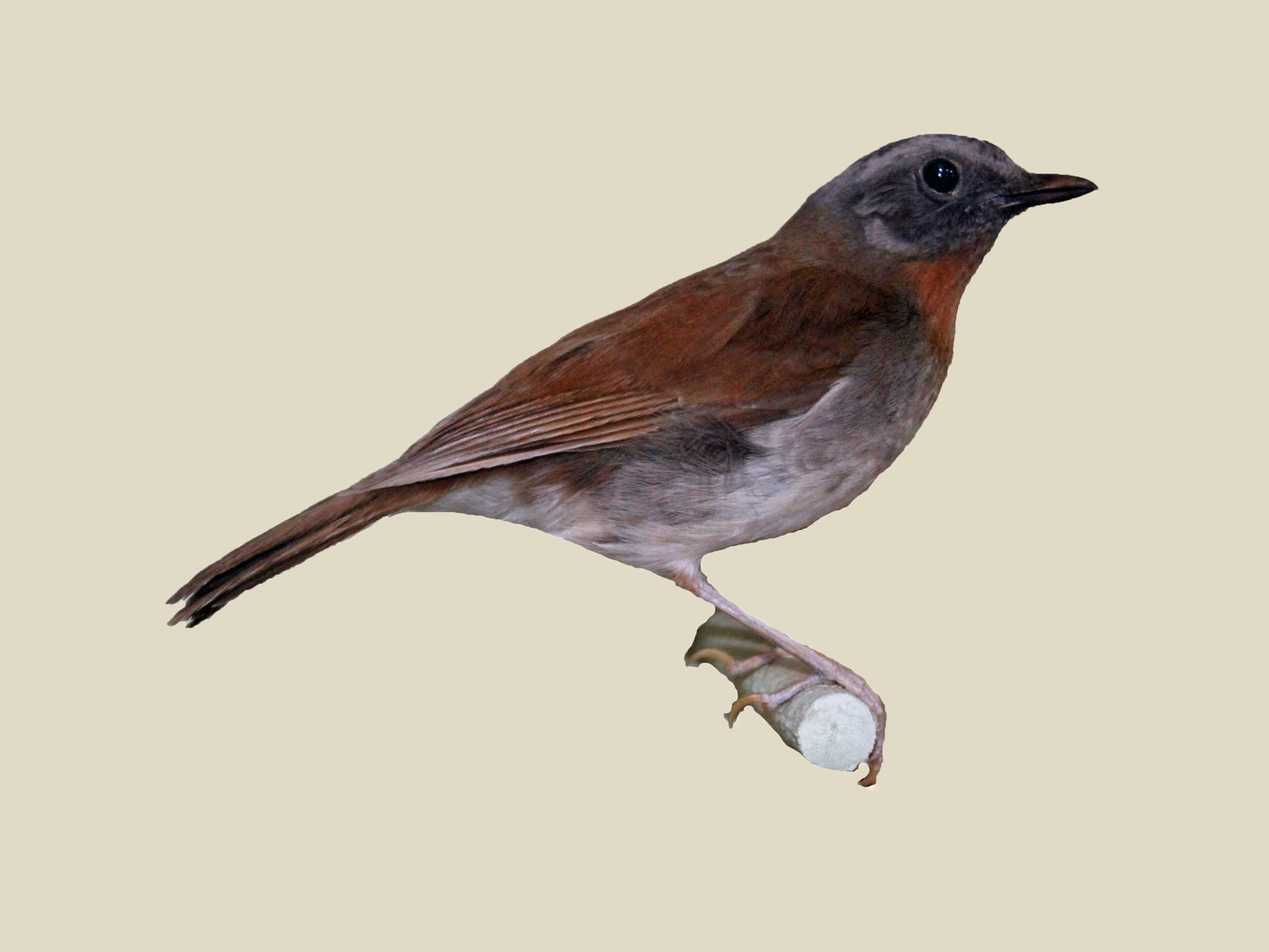
- Specimen at Nairobi National Museum
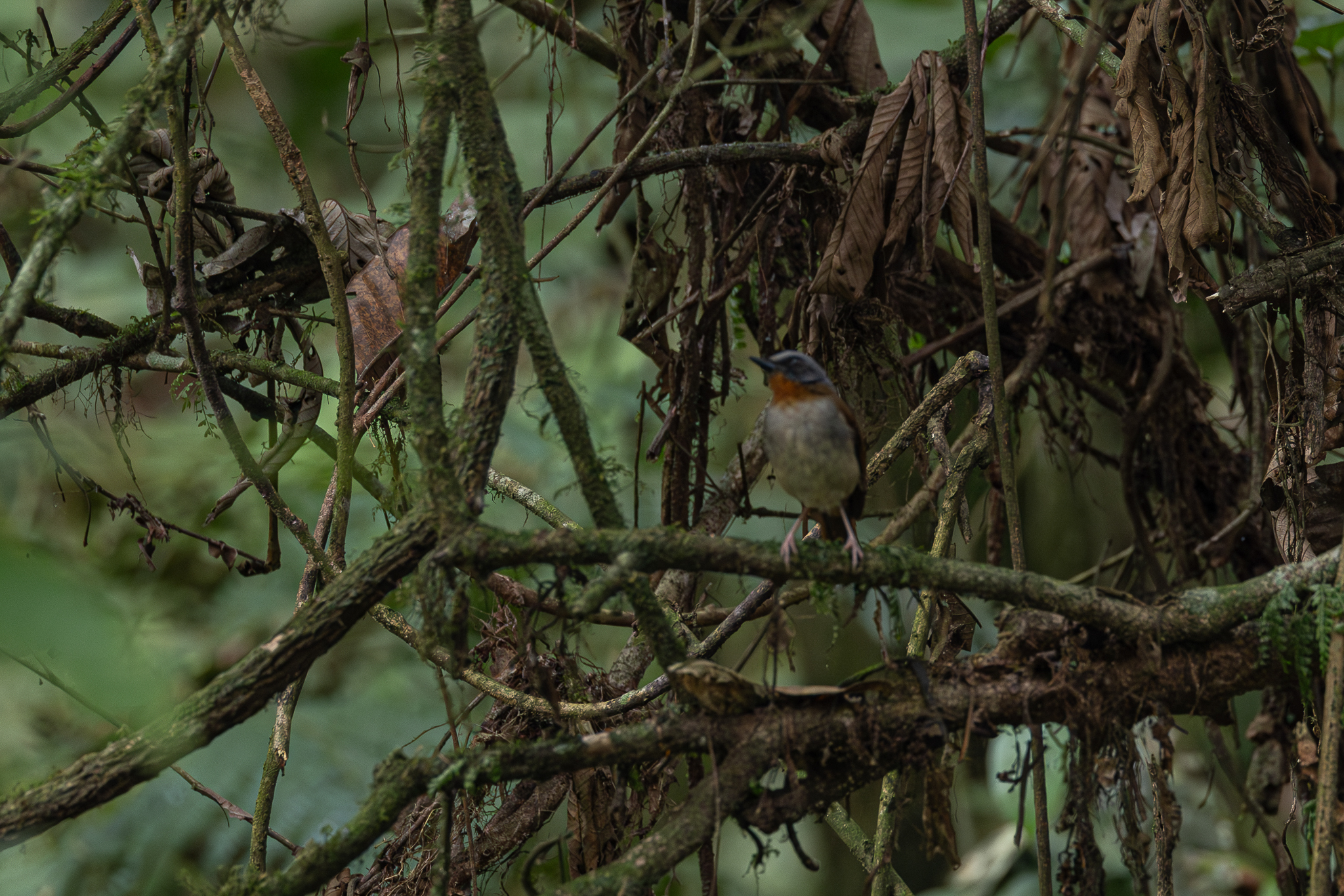

Conservation status
- Least Concern (IUCN 3.1)

Scientific classification
- Kingdom: Animalia
- Phylum: Chordata
- Class: Aves
- Order: Passeriformes
- Family: Muscicapidae
- Genus: Chamaetylas
- Species: C. poliophrys

Binomial name
- Chamaetylas poliophrys (Sharpe, 1902)

Synonyms
- Pseudalethe poliophrys (Sharpe, 1902); Alethe poliophrys Sharpe, 1902

= Red-throated alethe =

Species of bird

The red-throated alethe (Chamaetylas poliophrys) is a species of bird in the family Muscicapidae. It is native to the Albertine Rift montane forests.
