= Mount Namuli =

Mountain in Mozambique

- Mount Namuli - Landsat7

Highest point
- Elevation: 2,419 m (7,936 ft)
- Prominence: 1,755 m (5,758 ft)
- Listing: Ultra; Ribu
- Coordinates: 15°22′S 37°02′E

Geography
- Location: Zambezia Province, Mozambique

Mount Namuli is the second highest mountain in Mozambique and the highest in the Province of Zambezia. It is 2,419 m (7,936 ft) high and was measured, surveyed and described in 1886 by Henry Edward O'Neill, the British consul in Mozambique. The Namuli massif consists of a level plateau with the granite dome of Mount Namuli above. The area was historically clad in tropical rainforest and is an important biodiversity hotspot with many endemic species of animals and plants. The lower slopes are now mainly used for the cultivation of tea and the middle slopes for other agricultural purposes, with indigenous forest now mostly restricted to the higher parts and corridors along water courses.

== Geography ==
Mount Namuli is the highest peak in the Zambezia Province of Mozambique. At 2,420 metres it is the second highest mountain of Mozambique behind the Monte Binga. The Namuli massif consists of a level plateau which rises 700 to 800 metre. The granite dome of the Namuli rises 1,600 metre above the plateau. The area above 1,200 metre measures 50 x 30 km. Mount Namuli is located 12 km north-east of Gurué and about 160 km from the Mulanje Massif in south-eastern Malawi.

The forests of Mount Namuli are an important biodiversity hotspot which means that they have a high biodiversity rate of threatened animals and plant taxa. Species like the Namuli apalis (Apalis lynesi) and the Vincent's bush squirrel (Paraxerus vincenti) are endemic to Mount Namuli. Other rare species are the Thyolo alethe (Chamaetylas choloensis) and the dapple-throat (Arcanator orostruthus) which occur elsewhere too.

The lower slopes of Mount Namuli are dominated by tea plantations. The middle slopes are agrarian oriented. Indigenous forests are confined to corridors along stream courses. The nearest town is Gurúè which is the largest tea estate of Mozambique.

== History ==
Mount Namuli was first explored in August 1886 by Henry Edward O'Neill who was the British consul in Mozambique in 1879. It became notable in ornithological circles for the expedition by Hubert Lynes and Jack Vincent in 1931/1932. Due to the Mozambican Civil War and poor road access, it was not until 1998 when a South African team of ornithologists were able to explore the forests of Mount Namuli. In 2024 scientists proposed a new ecoregion, to be called the South East Africa Montane Archipelago (SEAMA), which would include Mount Namuli and other regional inselbergs.
