= Mount Chiperone =

Mountain in Mozambique

- Location within Mozambique

Highest point
- Elevation: 2,065 m (6,775 ft)
- Prominence: 1,486 m (4,875 ft)
- Listing: Ribu
- Coordinates: 16°28′44″S 35°42′48″E

Naming
- Language of name: Portuguese

Geography
- Location: Milange District, Zambezia Province, Mozambique

Mount Chiperone is a mountain in northern Mozambique. It lies in Milange District of Zambézia Province, 40 km SSW of the town of Milange.

Mount Chiperone rises from the surrounding plains, 50 km south of the Mount Mulanje massif in southern Malawi. The plains to the north are part of the Central African Plateau, about 400–450 m altitude. The plains to the south are lower, 200–350 meters elevation, descending towards the Zambezi River. The valley of the Shire River, part of the African Rift Valley system, lies 35 km to the west.

About 100 square kilometers of the mountain lie above 600 meters elevation, with around 4915 hectares above 800 meters elevation, 2770 ha above 1000 meters, and only 110 ha over 1800 meters.

== Flora ==
The plant communities on Mount Chiperone vary with elevation and exposure.

Miombo woodland is predominant below 1000 meters elevation. Most of the woodland below 800 meters elevation has been cleared for cultivation, with most of the remaining woodland on the northern and western slopes. Brachystegia spiciformis is the predominant tree in the woodland, forming a 10-15 meter high canopy. B. utilis is more common on drier ridges and shallower soils, forming an open canopy of 8-10 meters. Both species are dry-season deciduous, and canopy cover ranges from 80% to 20%, with a well-developed grass layer covering the ground underneath. Associated trees include Bridelia micrantha, Combretum molle, Pericopsis angolensis, Pterocarpus angolensis, Erythrina abyssinica, Cussonia arborea, Uapaca kirkiana, Uapaca nitida, Psorospermum febrifugum, Parinari excelsa, and Faurea saligna.

Above 1000 meters elevation, the woodlands transition to medium-elevation forests. The main tree species are Newtonia buchananii, Strombosia scheffleri, Rinorea convallarioides, Gambeya gorungosana, and scattered large Khaya anthotheca. Albizia gummifera, Macaranga capensis, and Trema orientalis are found at the forest edges, and where the forest transitions to woodland.

High-elevation forests are found above 1600 meters elevation.
