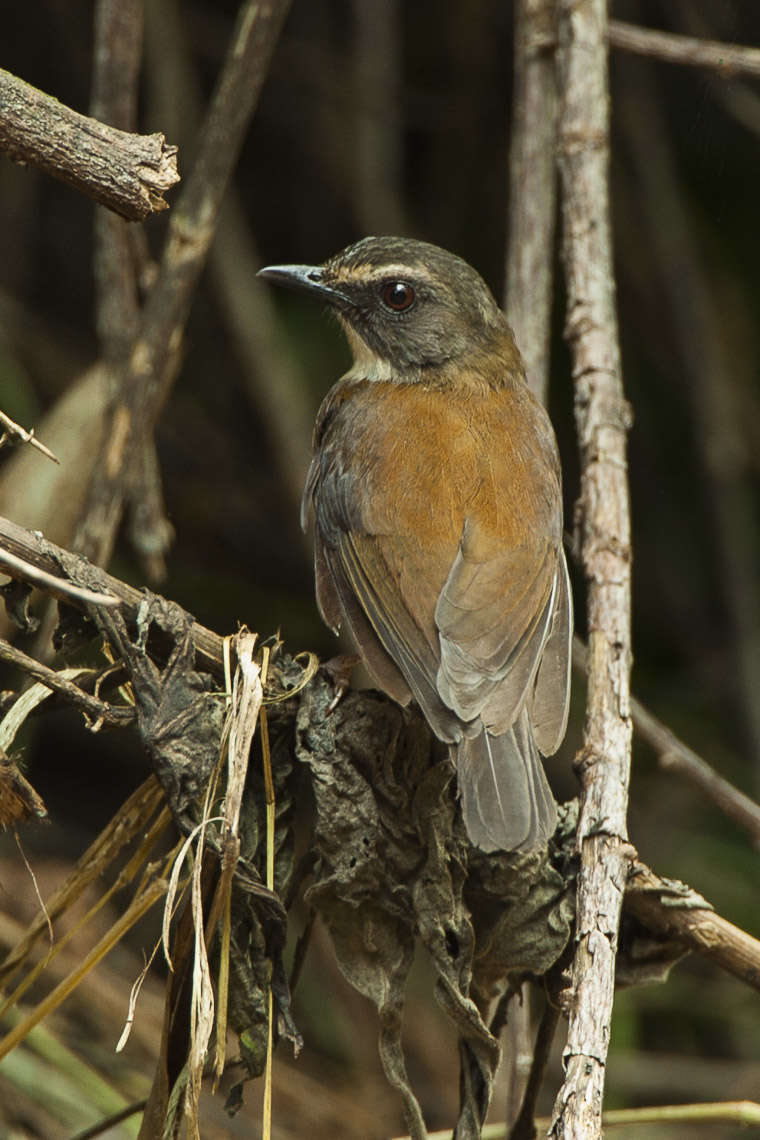
- C. p. carruthersi in Kakamega Forest

Conservation status
- Least Concern (IUCN 3.1)

Scientific classification
- Kingdom: Animalia
- Phylum: Chordata
- Class: Aves
- Order: Passeriformes
- Family: Muscicapidae
- Genus: Chamaetylas
- Species: C. poliocephala

Binomial name
- Chamaetylas poliocephala (Bonaparte, 1850)

Synonyms
- Pseudalethe poliocephala Bonaparte, 1850; Alethe poliocephala (Bonaparte, 1850)

= Brown-chested alethe =

Species of bird

The brown-chested alethe (Chamaetylas poliocephala) is a species of bird in the Old World flycatcher family Muscicapidae. It has a discontinuous range of presence across the African tropical rainforest.

Its natural habitats are subtropical or tropical moist lowland forest and subtropical or tropical moist montane forest.

== Taxonomy ==
The brown-chested alethe was formally described in 1850 by the French naturalist Charles Lucien Bonaparte based on a manuscript by Coenraad Temminck. Bonaparte gave the binomial name as Trichophorus (Griniger) and the locality as Africa. The locality has been restricted to the island of Bioko (formally Fernando Po). The specific epithet combines the Ancient Greek polios meaning "grey" with -kephalos meaning "-headed". The brown-chested alethe is now one of four species placed in the genus Chamaetylas that was introduced in 1860 by Ferdinand Heine.

Nine subspecies are recognised:

- C. p. poliocephala (Bonaparte, 1850) – Sierra Leone to Ghana
- C. p. compsonota (Cassin, 1859) – south Nigeria to southwest Central African Republic, northwest Angola and Bioko
- C. p. hallae (Traylor, 1961) – west Angola
- C. p. giloensis (Cunningham-Van Someren & Schifter, 1981) – south Sudan
- C. p. carruthersi (Ogilvie-Grant, 1906) – southeast Central African Republic, northeast DR Congo, Uganda and west Kenya
- C. p. akeleyae (Dearborn, 1909) – central Kenya
- C. p. vandeweghei (Prigogine, 1984) – Rwanda and Burundi
- C. p. kungwensis (Moreau, 1941) – west Tanzania
- C. p. ufipae (Moreau, 1942) – southeast DR Congo and southwest Tanzania
