= Lioma =

Lioma Nihoma
- Administrative post
- Location within Mozambique
- Coordinates: 15°10′30″S 36°48′12″E
- Country: Mozambique
- Provinces: Zambezia
- District: Gurué
- Founded: 1890s
- Elevation: 610 m (2,000 ft)

Population
  - Total: Thousands
- Time zone: UTC+2 (CAT)

Lioma, also known as Nihoma in Lomwe, is an administrative post in Zambezia Province, Mozambique. It is a rural community dominated by agriculture, and a centre of soybean production. Lioma has suffered from numerous military conflicts during its history, and was the site of a battle of World War I.

== History ==
=== Colonial period, war of independence, and civil war ===
In the late 19th century, the area where Lioma was later founded was affected by the Arab slave trade. The region was conquered by the Portuguese Empire in the 1890s, and consequently integrated into the colony of Portuguese Mozambique. Lioma itself was founded as a boma by the Portuguese to secure the area after they had defeated a regional chief, Namarohi, who had offered heavy resistance to the colonial army. Lioma was named after another local chief.

In the course of the East African Campaign of World War I, the boma became the site of a supply depot of the British King's African Rifles, who attempted to encircle and destroy the German Schutztruppe that were waging a guerrilla campaign in Mozambique. In August 1918, the Germans attacked the village to capture its supplies, but the British managed to repel them in the subsequent Battle of Lioma.

In the course of the Mozambican War of Independence (1964–1974), Lioma saw little combat, but was prepared for the installation of a large number of Portuguese settlers. Few Whites actually moved to the area, however, as the Portuguese government had problems providing subsidies to settlers. Following the People's Republic of Mozambique's independence in 1975, the new FRELIMO government nationalised the abandoned settler farms at Lioma and transformed them, alongside the "intervening" land of native peasants, into a Soviet-style state farm. The Agricultural Complex of Lioma (CAPEL), as the state farm was named, planted soybeans and other crops with development aid from Brazil. At the time, Lioma was the centre of soybean production in Mozambique. The farm was abandoned in the 1980s, however, when state agents and civilians fled Lioma due to the Mozambican Civil War. RENAMO operated in the area during this conflict, and kidnapped locals.

=== Economic growth after the civil war ===
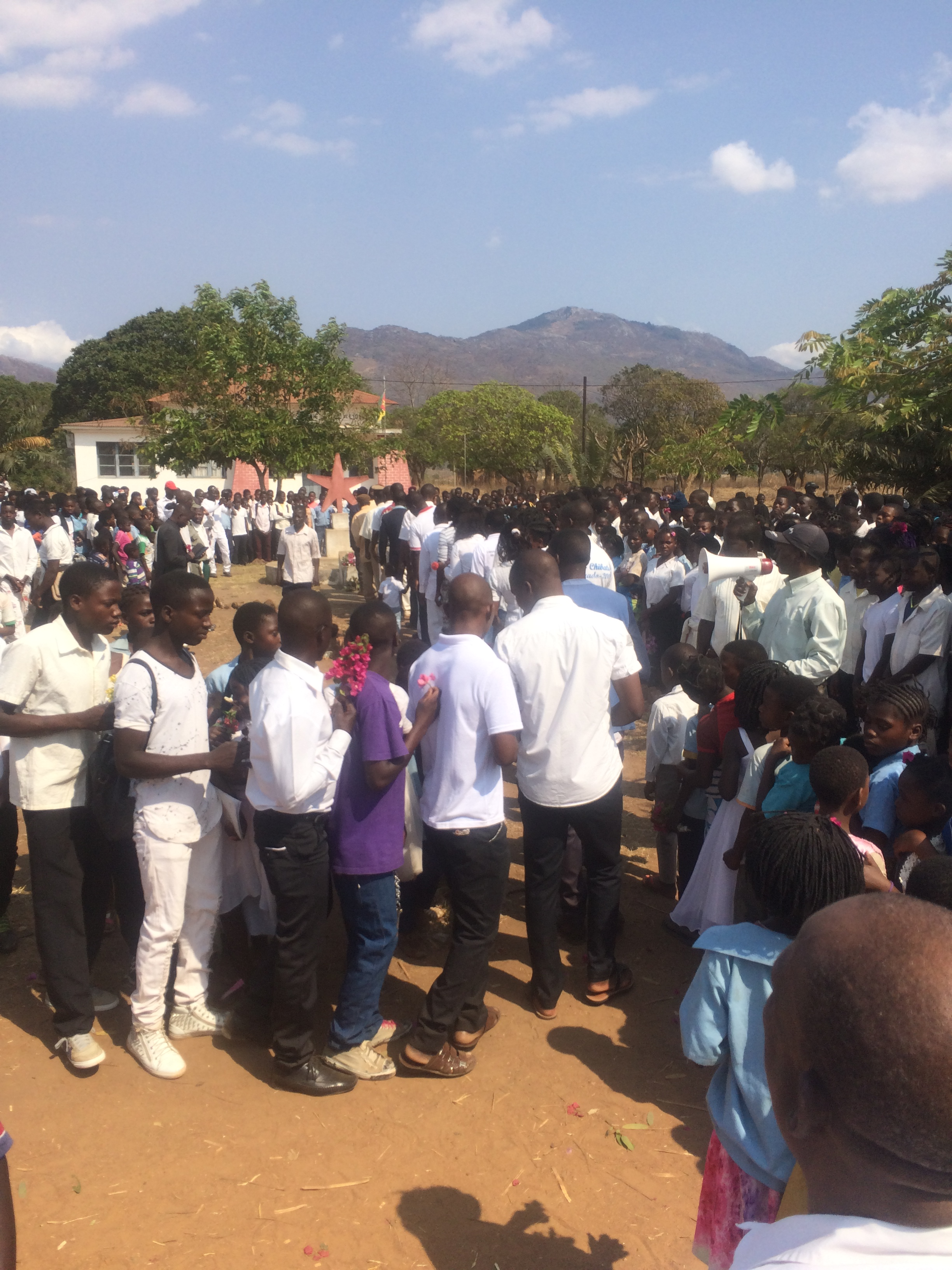
People in Lioma celebrate the World Day of Peace in 2017

After the civil war ended, farmers returned to Lioma and began to cultivate the land on a larger scale than before. An NGO, the National Cooperative Business Association, started to support Lioma's farmers in the early 2000s by reintroducing soybeans and promoting farmer associations. These efforts were "highly successful", as they increased local incomes and attracted further investment by outsiders.

In 2003, Lioma was the site of a scandal when it was revealed that a local teacher had sexually abused several female students. After intense lobbying by the Mozambican Association for Gender and Education and Oxfam, the Ministry of Education passed a landmark decision resulting in the dismissal of the teacher and new regulations that provided better legal protection for students nationwide.

A major change took place in Lioma in 2009 when the Mozambican government awarded 10,000 hectares (25,000 acres) that had belonged to the old state farm to the Portuguese company Quifel. Even though the rights to use this land were owned by 244 local farmers under the 1997 Land Law, Quifel was allowed to appropriate it for its "Hoyo Hoyo" project, and the company even seized an additional 500 hectares (1,200 acres). Disputes with the locals quickly ensued, especially because the company barely used the land it had been granted.

In July 2012, the government forced Quifel to begin preparing at least 3,500 hectares (8,600 acres) for production. The 836 farmers who had lived on this land agreed to resettle, but disputes continued about the conditions of resettlement, as the new land given to the native farmers was allegedly unsuitable for farming. In August 2014, Brazilian company AGROMOZ drove over 1,000 farmers from their land in Wakhua, a village under Lioma's jurisdiction, to produce soybeans on their land.

== Geography ==
Lioma is part of Gurué District in Zambezia Province, close to the border of Nampula Province. Located around 600 metres (2,000 ft) above sea level in the highlands of western Mozambique, Lioma lies in a valley formed by a stream. It is surrounded by steep hills, which have traditionally been dominated by dense bush interspersed with trees.

== Economy ==
The area around Lioma is well-suited for agriculture, but like the rest of Zambezia Province, it is also one of the poorest regions of Mozambique. When the Portuguese colonial government wanted to settle Whites in the area, they were supposed to live from tea cultivation. Though many locals still live as subsistence farmers, soybean production has become increasingly important since independence. International companies that have invested in Lioma also produce soybeans.

== Bibliography ==
- Adams, Gregg (2016). King's African Rifles Soldier versus Schutztruppe Soldier: East Africa 1917–18. Oxford: Osprey Publishing. ISBN 978-1-4728-1327-5.
- Aikman, Sheila; Unterhalter, Elaine; Challender, Chloe (2005). "The education MDGs: achieving gender equality through curriculum and pedagogy change". In Caroline Sweetman (ed.). Gender and the Millennium Development Goals. Oxford: Oxfam. pp. 44–55. ISBN 978-0-85598-550-9.
- Bandawe, Lewis Mataka (1971). B. Pachai (ed.). Memoirs of a Malawian: the life and reminiscences of Lewis Mataka Bandawe. Blantyre: CLAIM.
- Di Matteo, Filipe; Otsuki, Kei; Schoneveld, George (2016). Ashley Lau; Jonathan Melo; Silvana Rebaza; Gabriela Smarrelli; Andrea Villarreal Ojeda; Zachary Clemence (eds.). "Soya bean expansion in Mozambique: exploring the inclusiveness and viability of soya business models as an alternative to the land grab" (PDF). The Public Sphere. (LSE Africa Summit Edition 2016, Challenging Conventions): 61–86. Archived from the original (PDF) on 2017-04-24.
- Jundanian, Brendan F. (July 1974). "Resettlement Programs: Counterinsurgency in Mozambique". Comparative Politics. 6 (4): 519–540. doi:10.2307/421336. JSTOR 421336.
- O'Laughlin, Bridget (March 1995). "Past and Present Options: Land Reform in Mozambique". Review of African Political Economy. 22 (63): 99–106. doi:10.1080/03056249508704104. JSTOR 4006278.
- Smith, Whitney L.; Naylor, Rosamond L. (2014). "Land Institutions and Food Security in Sub-Saharan Africa". In Rosamond L. Naylor (ed.). The Evolving Sphere of Food Security. Oxford: Oxford University Press. pp. 202–238. ISBN 9780199354078.
- Waterhouse, Rachel (1996). Mozambique: Rising from the Ashes. Oxford: Oxfam. ISBN 978-0855983413.
