= Kurt Wahle =

German general

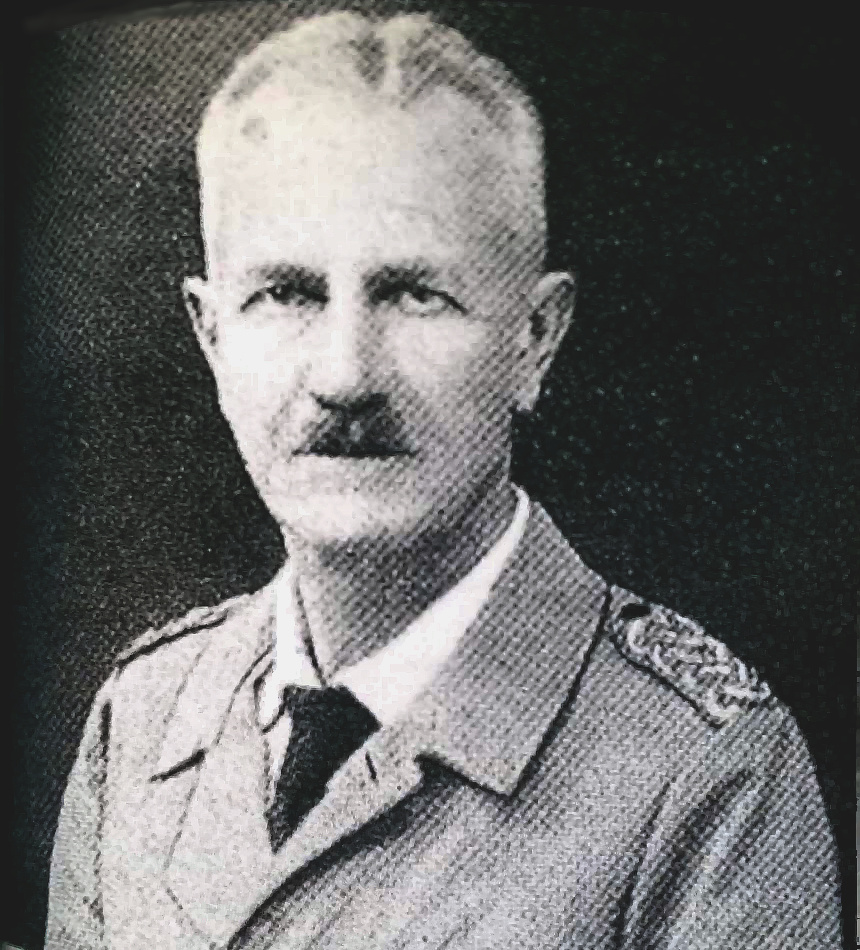
- Born: Friedrich Johann Kurt Wahle; December 26, 1855; Bad Düben, Saxony
- Died: June 19, 1928 (aged 72); Dresden, Germany
- Military career
- Allegiance: Saxony; German Empire
- Branch: Royal Saxon Army; German Imperial Army
- Service years: 1873-1910, 1914-1918
- Rank: Generalmajor; Char. Generalleutnant
- Conflicts: World War I: Battle of Tabora; Battle of Lioma
- Awards: Iron Cross (First Class); Military Order of St. Henry (Commander 2nd Class); Civil Order of Saxony (Commander 2nd Class)

Kurt Wahle (26 December 1855 – 19 June 1928) was a Saxon general who travelled to German East Africa in 1914 to visit his son. Being in the colony at the outbreak of World War I, he volunteered to serve under Paul von Lettow-Vorbeck, despite outranking him, and became one of his front commanders.

== Biography ==
Friedrich Johann Curt Wahle was born on 26 December 1854 near the town of Düben (now called Bad Düben), which lies about 37 kilometres northeast of Leipzig, in what was then the Kingdom of Saxony. From an early age Kurt Wahle was destined for a military career. He was educated at the Kadettenhaus in Dresden, and in 1873 he was appointed as a Fähnrich, or officer candidate, in the Royal Saxon Army. Wahle had reached the rank of first lieutenant by August 1883, when he married Jenny Förster at Leipzig. Their son, Ralph, was born in July 1884. In 1903 Wahle was promoted to colonel, and in 1908 to major general. However by 1910 he realised that, under peacetime conditions, there was no prospect of further promotion, so he applied for retirement, and was duly pensioned.

Wahle arrived in German East Africa the day before Britain declared war on Germany. Because he outranked the local military commander, Lieutenant Colonel Paul von Lettow-Vorbeck, there was initial reluctance to enlist him in the local military force, despite his willingness to serve under Lettow. Eventually Wahle was accepted into the Schutztruppe, and by the end of August 1914 he was based at Morogoro, in charge of the vital supply lines. In May 1915 he was sent to lead a raid into Northern Rhodesia (now Zambia), and in October Lettow placed him in charge of the troops in the west of German East Africa. This was effectively an independent command, as it was impossible for Wahle to maintain regular contact with Lettow, who was operating in the north and east of the colony. Early in 1916 the Belgian troops from the Congo began a large-scale invasion of German East Africa, and Wahle was obliged to fall back to Tabora, and then retreat slowly in a southeasterly direction.

Wahle led his forces through arid, largely uninhabited country, up into the highlands of Uhehe, which were already occupied by the British. To those who knew the terrain, this operation was regarded as a master stroke. Wahle's troops then breached the British lines and descended to the Kilombero valley, where they were reunited with Lettow's troops in November 1916. Wahle was given command of the German forces in this area, but in April 1917 Lettow transferred him to the Lindi front, where he led the dogged German retreat up the Lukuledi valley. In October he was battlefield commander at the murderous Battle of Mahiwa.

In November 1917 Lettow led all his remaining troops across the Ruvuma River into Portuguese East Africa (now Mozambique). Here the problem of provisioning became particularly acute. Lettow split his force into two, to permit more extensive foraging, and thus Wahle again exercised an independent command for some time. On 8 December 1917 Wahle's detachment seized the Portuguese fort at Mount Mecula. Around March 1918 Wahle's detachment was reunited with the main force. When Wahle was ailing Lettow ordered him to stay behind but he refused, claiming that the order was illegal since it effectively would be an order to surrender. Lettow relented, and in September 1918 Wahle crossed the Ruvuma with the remainder of the force, and so re-entered German East Africa. Wahle had for some time been suffering from a double hernia, and on 18 October 1918 he was forced to remain behind at Njombe and surrender to the British.

Wahle was interned at Dar es Salaam, where he was shortly joined by Lettow and the remaining German troops, who had surrendered in Northern Rhodesia following the armistice in Europe. They were all soon repatriated, reaching Rotterdam at the end of February 1919. On 2 March they made a triumphal entry into Berlin to the cheers of a huge and enthusiastic crowd.

During the campaign he was awarded the Iron Cross (Second and First Class). He also was recommended for the order Pour le Mérite by von Lettow-Vorbeck, however the recommendation did not reach Germany before the war ended and thus was never approved or awarded. In May 1917 Wahle was awarded the honorary rank of lieutenant general.

On return to Germany he resumed his life as a retired military officer, and in October 1920 he published privately, for limited circulation, his memoirs of the campaign in East Africa. This small book was dedicated to his son, Ralph, who survived the war and resumed his legal career after his return to Germany. Father and son set up house together just outside Dresden. In the 1920s Wahle was actively involved in the agitation to regain the colonies which Germany had lost under the terms of the Treaty of Versailles. Kurt Wahle died in Dresden on 19 June 1928 at the age of 73, having tripped over some scaffolding at his residence.
