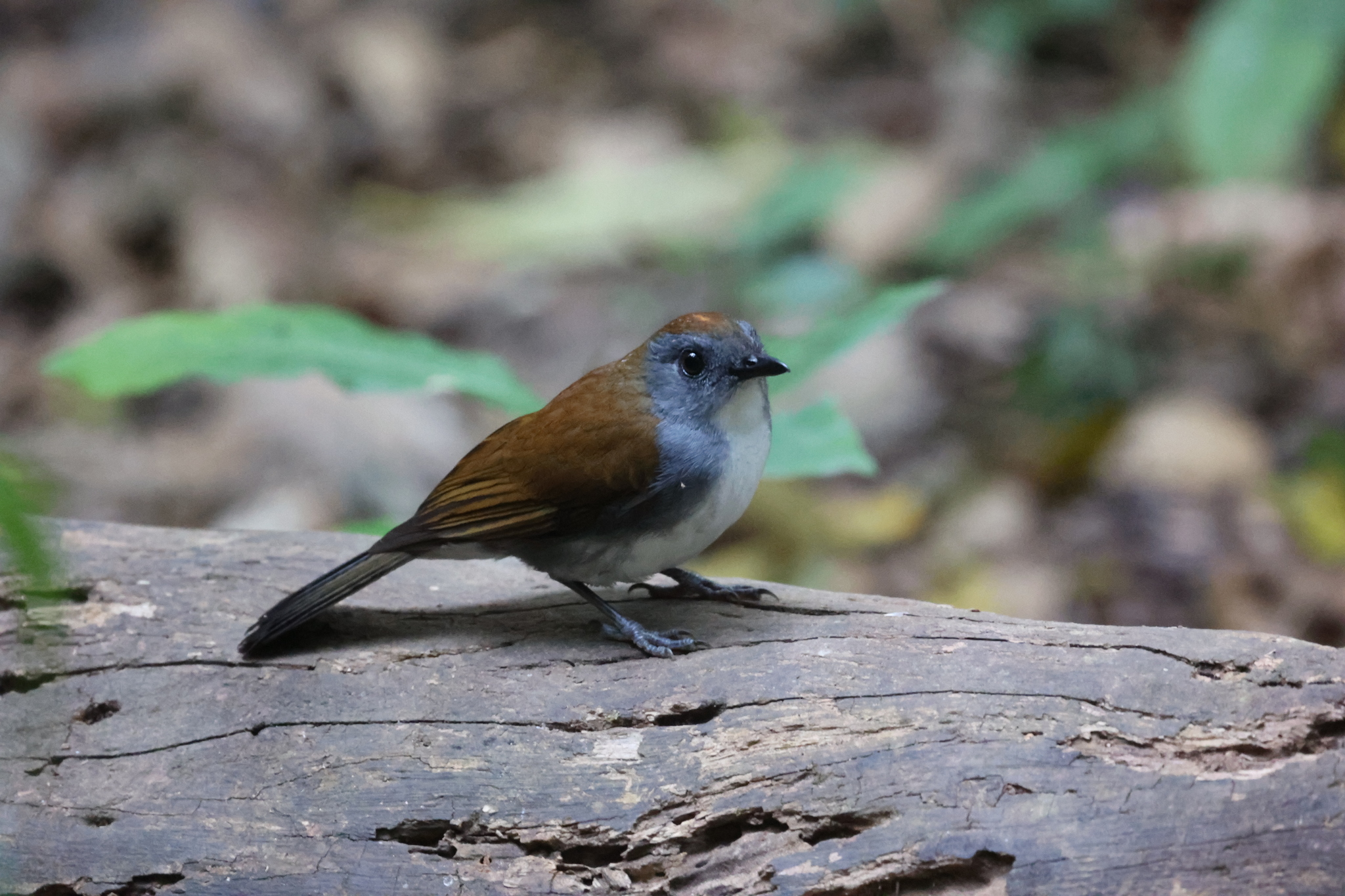
- Fire-crested alethe in Uganda

Conservation status
- Least Concern (IUCN 3.1)

Scientific classification
- Kingdom: Animalia
- Phylum: Chordata
- Class: Aves
- Order: Passeriformes
- Family: Muscicapidae
- Genus: Alethe
- Species: A. castanea

Binomial name
- Alethe castanea (Cassin, 1856)

= Fire-crested alethe =

Species of bird

The fire-crested alethe (Alethe castanea) is a species of bird in the Old World flycatcher family Muscicapidae. It is found in central Africa, from Nigeria to Uganda. Its natural habitat is subtropical or tropical moist lowland forests.

It has been recently split from the white-tailed alethe (A. diademata).
