= Gurué District =

Coordinates: 15°28′S 36°59′E

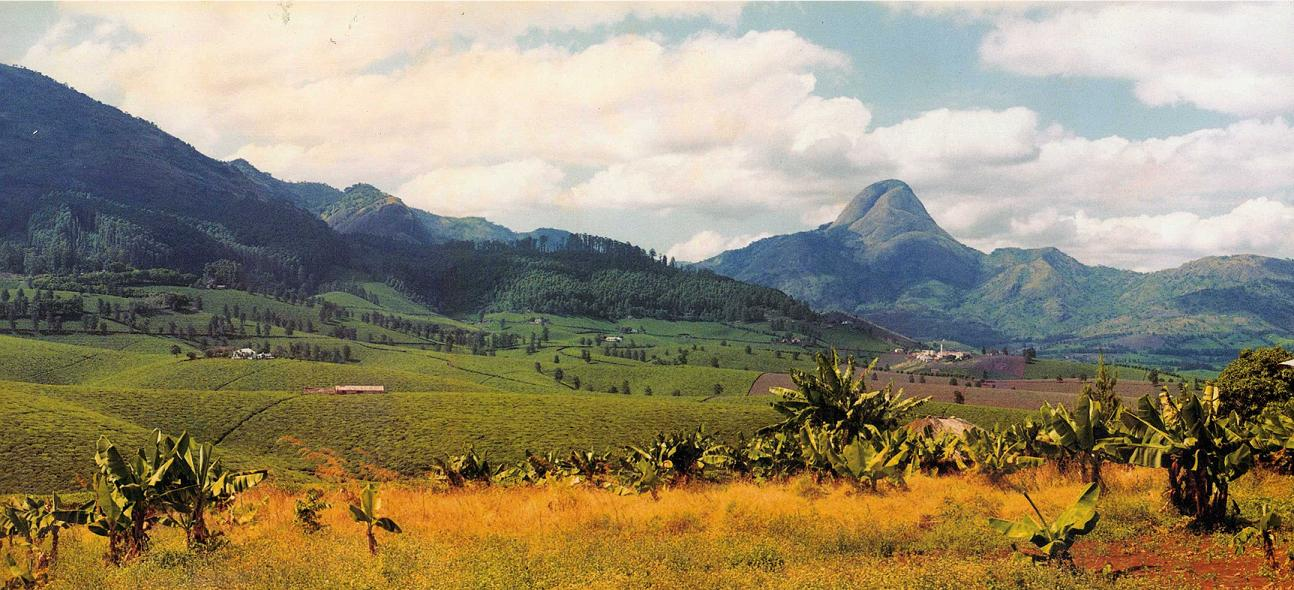
Panorama of Gurué District, Mount Murresse in the background

Gurué district in Mozambique

Gurué District is a district of Zambezia Province in Mozambique. The principal town is Gurué. Gurué is the country's largest tea-estate and has a population of around 116, 922.

== Settlements ==
- Gurué
- Lioma

== Geography ==
Gurué is located 350 km from the next international airport in Blantyre, Malawi.

== Economy ==
The economy is 90% based on tea plantations, though fruit, coffee, and other plantations do exist. Most people have small subsistence farms because they receive irregular salaries.
