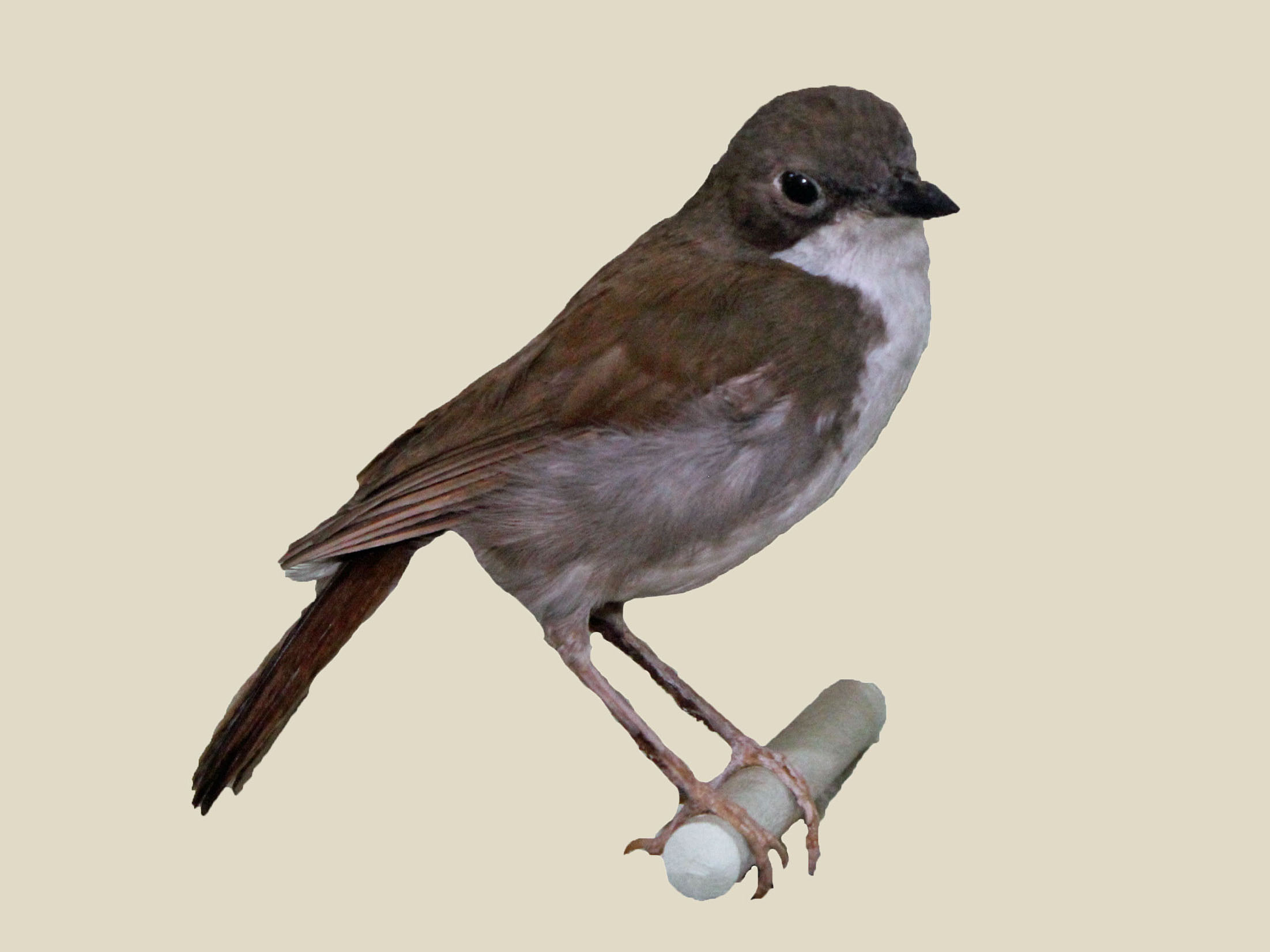
- Specimen at Nairobi National Museum
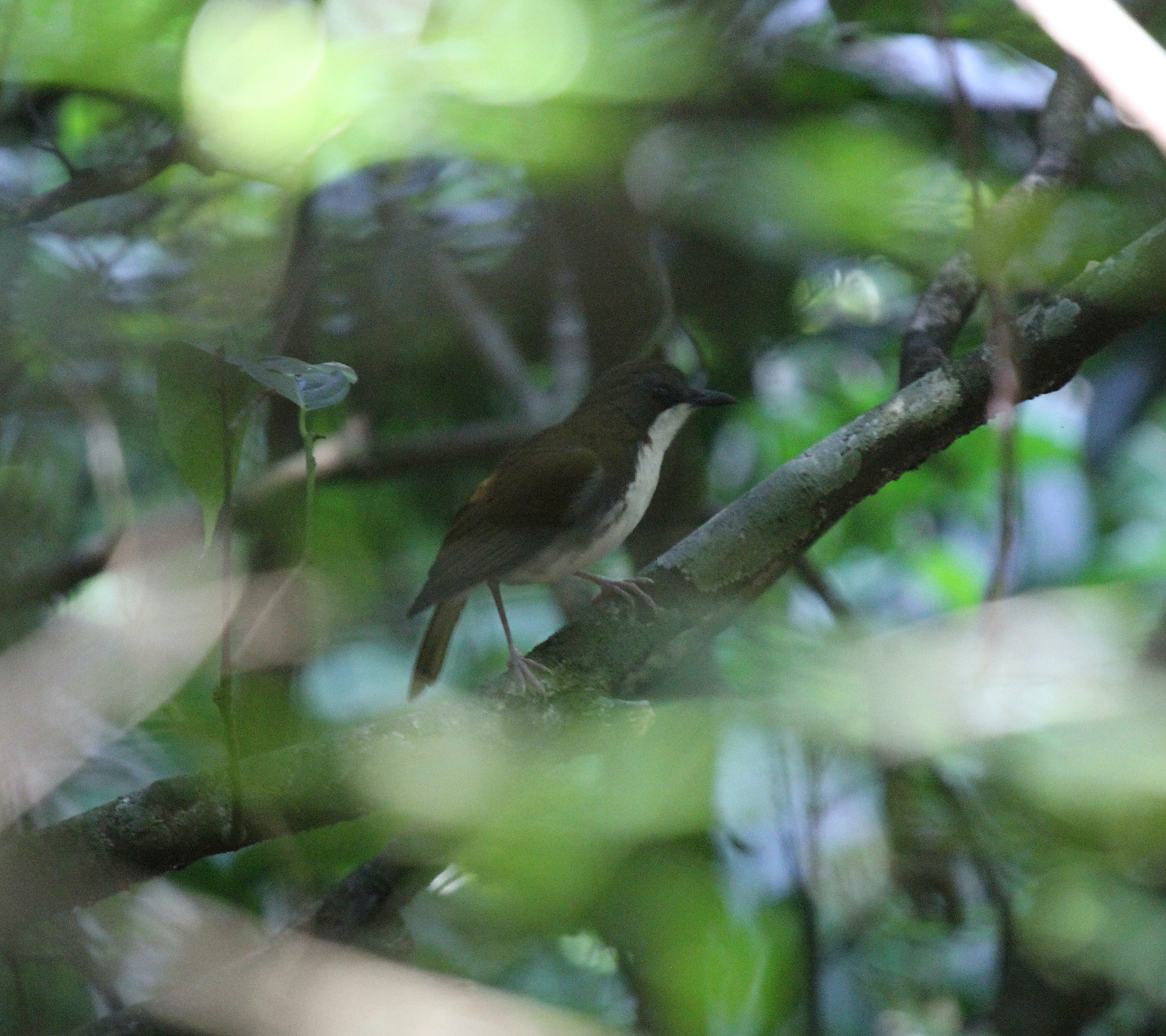

Conservation status
- Least Concern (IUCN 3.1)

Scientific classification
- Kingdom: Animalia
- Phylum: Chordata
- Class: Aves
- Order: Passeriformes
- Family: Muscicapidae
- Genus: Chamaetylas
- Species: C. fuelleborni

Binomial name
- Chamaetylas fuelleborni (Reichenow, 1900)

Synonyms
- Alethe fuelleborni (Reichenow, 1900); Pseudalethe fuelleborni (Reichenow, 1900)

= White-chested alethe =

Species of bird

The white-chested alethe (Chamaetylas fuelleborni) is a species of bird in the family Muscicapidae. It is found in Malawi, Mozambique, Tanzania, and Zambia.

Its natural habitat is subtropical or tropical moist lowland forests.

The binomial of the bird commemorates the German physician Friedrich Fülleborn.
