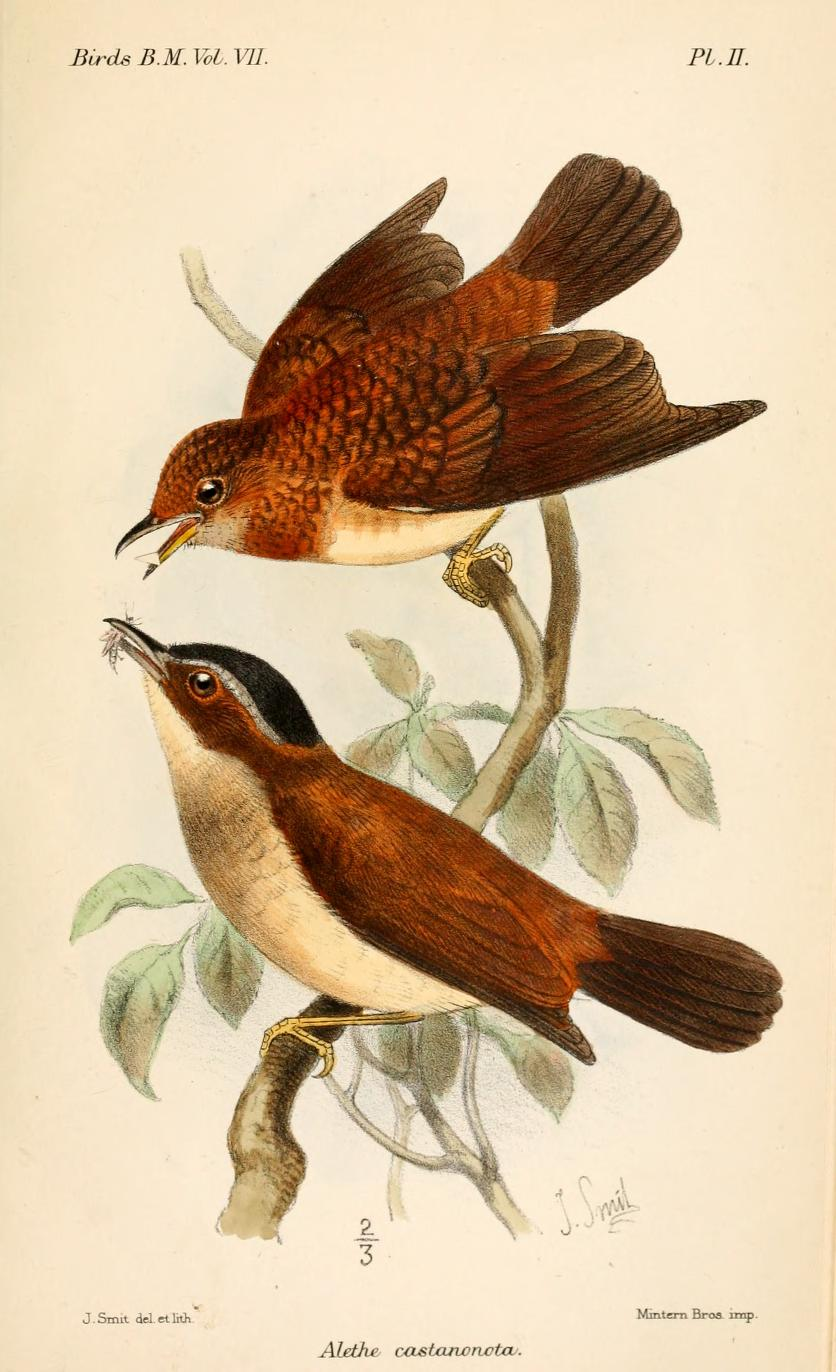
- Brown-chested alethe, Chamaetylas poliocephala

Scientific classification
- Kingdom: Animalia
- Phylum: Chordata
- Class: Aves
- Order: Passeriformes
- Family: Muscicapidae
- Genus: Chamaetylas; Heine, 1860

Type species
- Geocichla compsonota Cassin, 1859

Species
- See text

Synonyms
- Pseudalethe

= Chamaetylas =

Genus of birds

Chamaetylas is a genus of small, mainly insectivorous birds in the Old World flycatcher family Muscicapidae that are native to sub-Saharan Africa.

The genus was introduced by the German ornithologist Ferdinand Heine in 1860 with the type species as Geocichla compsonota Cassin, 1859, now a subspecies of the brown-chested alethe. Species in the genus were previously assigned to the genus Alethe which was included in the thrush family Turdidae. In 2010 two separate molecular phylogenetic studies found that Alethe was polyphyletic and that the members of both clades were better placed in the Old World flycatcher family Muscicapidae.

The genus contains the following four species:

Image	Common name	Scientific name	Distribution
	Red-throated alethe	Chamaetylas poliophrys	Albertine Rift montane forests
	Brown-chested alethe	Chamaetylas poliocephala	African tropical rainforest
	White-chested alethe	Chamaetylas fuelleborni	Tanzania, northern Malawi and central Mozambique
	Thyolo alethe	Chamaetylas choloensis	southern Malawi and northern Mozambique
