= Henry E. O'Neill =

Royal Navy officer (1848–1925)

Henry Edward O'Neill FRGS, FRAS, RN, (1848 – 1925) was a Royal Navy officer and British explorer of central Africa. He served as HBM consul, Mozambique. O'Neill was a Fellow of the Royal Astronomical Society and Royal Geographical Society, as well as an Honorary Corresponding Member of the Scottish Geographical Society. He was the 1882 recipient of the Royal Geographical Society's Back Award and the 1885 recipient of their Patron's Medal.

Some of his published works include, Journey from Mozambique to Lake Shirwa, and discovery of Lake Amaramba, and Astronomical observations between Mozambique coast and lake Nyassa. His narrative of first encounter in 1882 with residents of the plateau south of Mozambique's Ruvuma Region was the earliest written record on the area.
