= Gurúè =

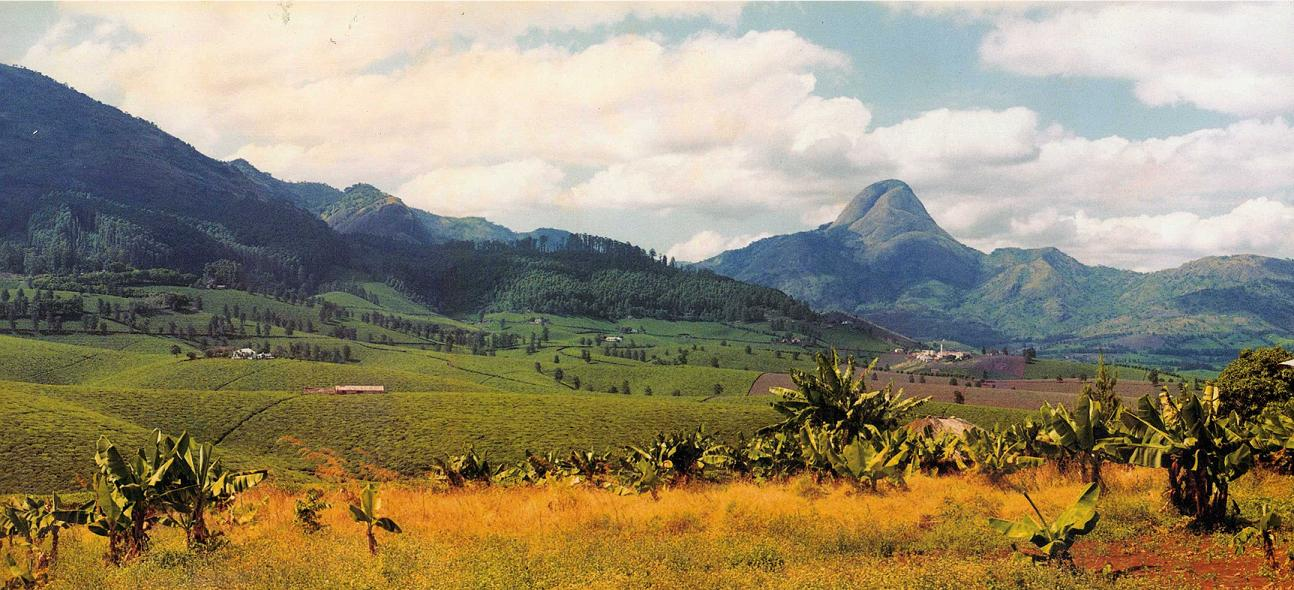
- In the background: Mount Murresse; near the center, to the right: "Plantações Manuel Saraiva Junqueiro" - tea factory.

- Location within Mozambique
- Coordinates: 15°28′S 36°59′E
- Country: Mozambique
- Provinces: Zambezia
- District: Gurué

Population
  - Total: 145,466 (2,007 census)

Gurúè (also spelt Gurué; known before independence as Vila Junqueiro) is a town located in the northern part of Mozambique, near the center of the province of Zambezia. It serves as the principal town of Gurué District, and is Mozambique's largest tea estate. According to the 2007 census, the town had a population of 145,466, an increase from the 99,335 inhabitants counted in the 1997 census.

== History ==
=== Portuguese rule ===
The name Gurúè is said to be local tribal dialect (Lomwe) for "porco do mato" (peccary), or the name of a local tribal chief. Gurúè was founded and named by the Portuguese in the 19th century and developed as a major tea producing town starting in the 1930s. The Portuguese authorities promoted a thriving economic climate and local tea companies become major players in the industry. SDZ Cha, Chá Moçambique, Companhia da Zambézia, Chá Gurúè and Plantações Manuel Saraiva Junqueiro were one of the major tea companies headquartered in the town. With good natural attractions - Namuli mountain range (2419 m), large tea plantations (chá in Portuguese), and rivers, leading tea brands, such as Cha St Antonio, Cha Murrace, Chá Moçambique, Chá Licungo, Chá Gurúè, and Chá Montebranco Junqueiro, achieved international recognition – most of the production was exported to the United Kingdom, United States and Canada. Other agricultural activities were developed as well. In the 1940s, over 300 Portuguese lived in the small town of Gurúè which gravitated around the tea aristocracy who provided all the amenities for the entire working population, including a private small airline to the largest cities on the coast, like Nampula, and the port city of Quelimane, the capital of Zambezia, in Portuguese East Africa. After the death of tea tycoon Manuel Saraiva Junqueiro, in an airplane crash, the town of Gurúè was renamed Vila Junqueiro in October 1959. By the late 1950s the town had grown, the cinema was founded and TAZ airline (Transportes Aéreos da Zambézia) increased its flights in the town's airfield. Under Portuguese administration the town expanded harmoniously in terms of urbanism and architectural landscape.

=== After independence from Portugal ===
After the independence of Mozambique from Portugal in 1975, Vila Junqueiro returned to its original name, Gurúè, and started a process of deep deterioration and economic and social decline. The exodus of the Portuguese, the eruption of the Mozambican Civil War (1977-1992) and the effects of FRELIMO's communist ideology, transformed the once thriving town in a few years.

== Geography ==
Gurué is located in the North of the Zambezia province, 350 km from the next international Airport in Blantyre, Malawi and also 350 km from Quelimane or Nampula, two of Mozambique's biggest cities. It is located at longitude 37 degrees 1 minute East and latitude 15 degrees 30 minutes South.

=== Climate ===
Gurúè has a temperate climate. Summers have temperatures in the range of 30 °C to 34 °C. Winters have temperatures in the range of 17 °C to 20 °C. Like in tropical climates, winter is usually referred to as the dry season, while summer is called the rainy season. Gurué's climate has much more rainfall than most of the rest of the province due to the effect of the mountains that surround the town. It creates a microclimate which is unusually cool and wet and therefore good for growing tea.

== Economy ==
Gurúè's economy depends mainly on the tea plantations (90%), though other plantation types can also be found such as coffee, fruit, etc. Most people also have small subsistence farms to supplement their irregular salaries.

== Demographics ==
According to Mozambique's Government 1997 census, Gurúè's population was estimated at 99,335 and in the 2007 census at 145,466. Most people in the area speak Lomwe.

== Transportation ==
Gurúè can be reached by car. One aerodrome is available for small aero planes. At present some South African investors engaged in Macadamia nuts use the aerodrome. Chartered planes could land at Gurue. The roads were tarred and in good condition until the floods of 2015.

== Wildlife ==
A 1998 birding expedition to Gurúè re-discovered the country's only endemic bird, Namuli apalis, unseen since it was discovered in 1932. It is now known to be thriving in forests in this area. According to a recent University of Cape Town scientific expedition "in a land of many natural treasures, Namuli (a mount near Gurúè, with 2419m and being the second highest mountain in Mozambique) is the jewel in the crown" and "a high-priority site for birds in Africa".

SDZ Cha, one of the tea plantation companies, maintain amidst their estate a small patch of rainforest, preserving the pristine nature. They also have some camp huts which are rented out for tourists.

== See also ==
- Zambezia Province
- Roman Catholic Diocese of Gurué
