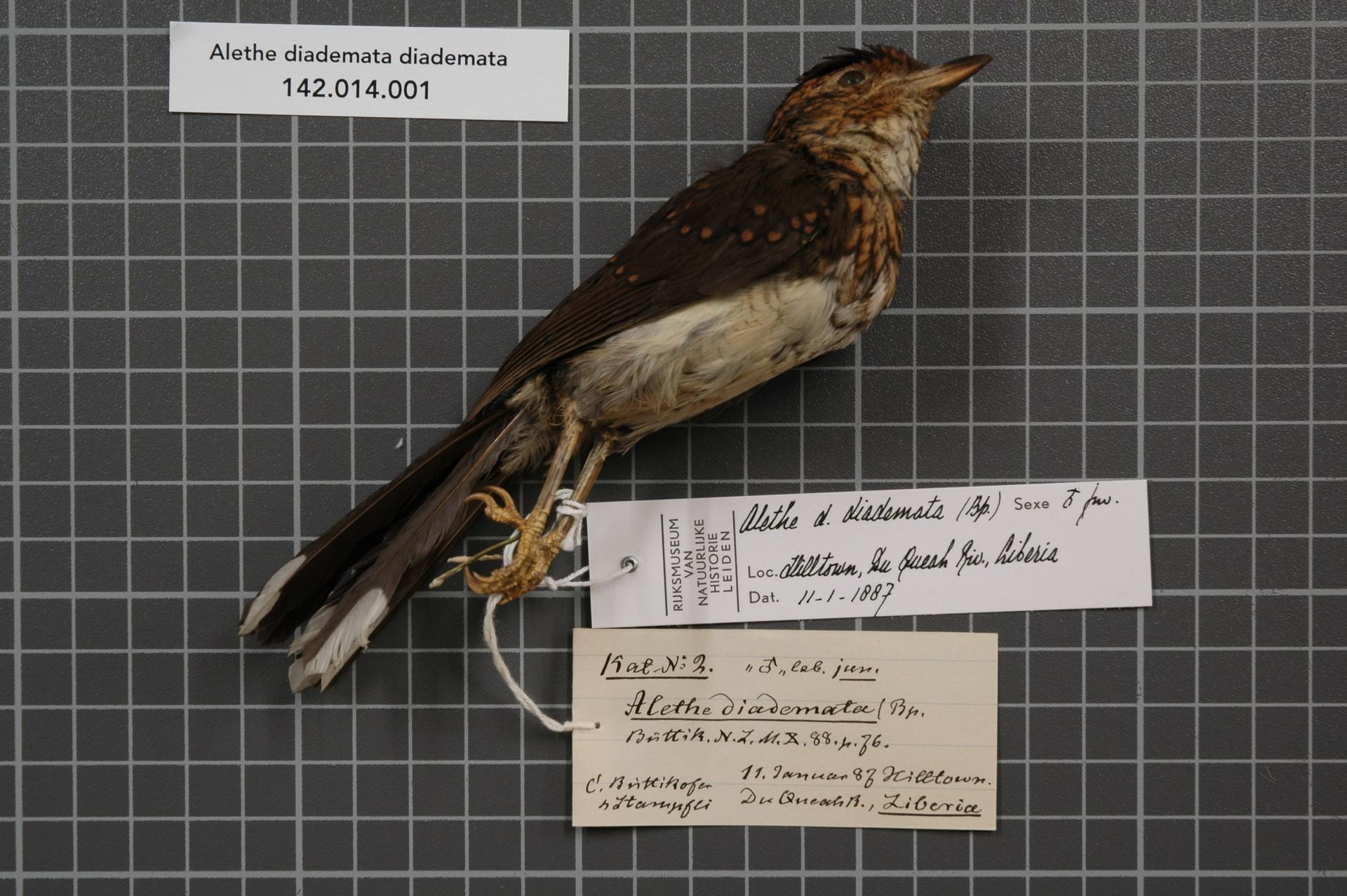
- Alethe diademata diademata (Bonaparte, 1851)

Scientific classification
- Kingdom: Animalia
- Phylum: Chordata
- Class: Aves
- Order: Passeriformes
- Family: Muscicapidae
- Genus: Alethe; Cassin, 1859

Species
- See text

= Alethe (genus) =

Genus of birds

Alethe is a genus of small mainly insectivorous birds in the Old World flycatcher family Muscicapidae that occur in West Africa.

The genus was erected by the American ornithologist John Cassin in 1859. The genus was previously placed in the thrush family Turdidae but in 2010 two separate molecular phylogenetic studies found that species in the genus were more closely related to members of the Old World flycatcher family.

The genus Alethe contains the following two species:

| Image | Common name | Scientific name |
|---|---|---|
| | White-tailed alethe | Alethe diademata |
| | Fire-crested alethe | Alethe castanea |

== Formerly in this genus ==
Four species formerly placed in this genus are not closely related to the type species, and have accordingly been reassigned to Chamaetylas (formerly Pseudalethe).
