= Zambezia Province =

Province of Mozambique

Coordinates: 17°0′S 37°0′E

Zambezia: Zambézia (Portuguese)
- Province
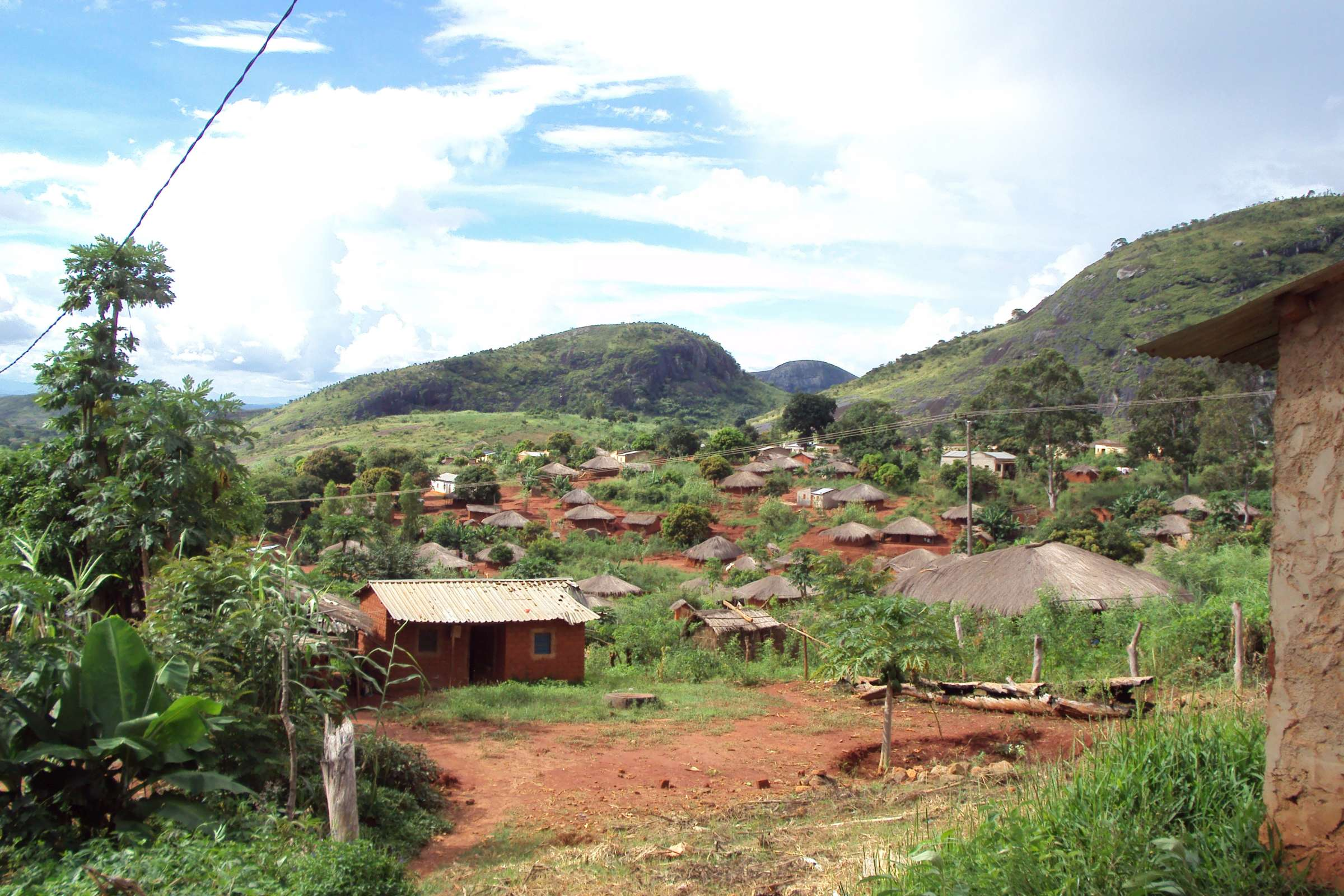

- Location of Zambezia in Mozambique
- Country: Mozambique
- Capital: Quelimane

Government
  - Governor: Pio Augusto Matos

Area
  - Total: 103,478 km^{2} (39,953 sq mi)

Population (2017 census)
  - Total: 5,110,787
  - Density: 49.3901/km^{2} (127.920/sq mi)
- Time zone: UTC+2 (CAT)
- Postal code: 24xx
- Area code: (+258) 24
- HDI (2019): 0.426 low · 9th of 11
- Website: www.zambezia.gov.mz

Zambezia (Portuguese: Zambézia [zɐ̃ˈbɛzjɐ]) is the second most-populous province of Mozambique. It is located in the central coastal region, and it borders the provinces of Niassa to the north, Nampula to the northeast, Sofala to the southwest, Tete to the west and the country of Malawi to the northwest. It has a population of 5.11 million, according to the 2017 census. The provincial capital is Quelimane.

Zambezia has a total area of 103,478 km^{2}. The 2,574 kilometre Zambezi River runs through Zambia, Angola, Namibia, Botswana, Zimbabwe, and the Tete, Manica and Sofala provinces of Mozambique before emptying into the Indian Ocean off the coast of Zambezia, constituting its western border. Mangroves are predominant along the coast and considerable forests can be found inland, with a scattering of estuaries and rivers.

Zambezia's islands lie in the Primeiras e Segundas Environmental Protection Area. These islands split into the Primeiras Islands and Segundas Islands (First Islands and Second Islands in Portuguese) and are largely uninhabited, aside from providing a stop-off for artisanal fishers. At present, only Ilha do Fogo, one of the Primeiras Islands, has infrastructure. It runs solely on clean energy, using solar power, and offers ecotourism retreats.

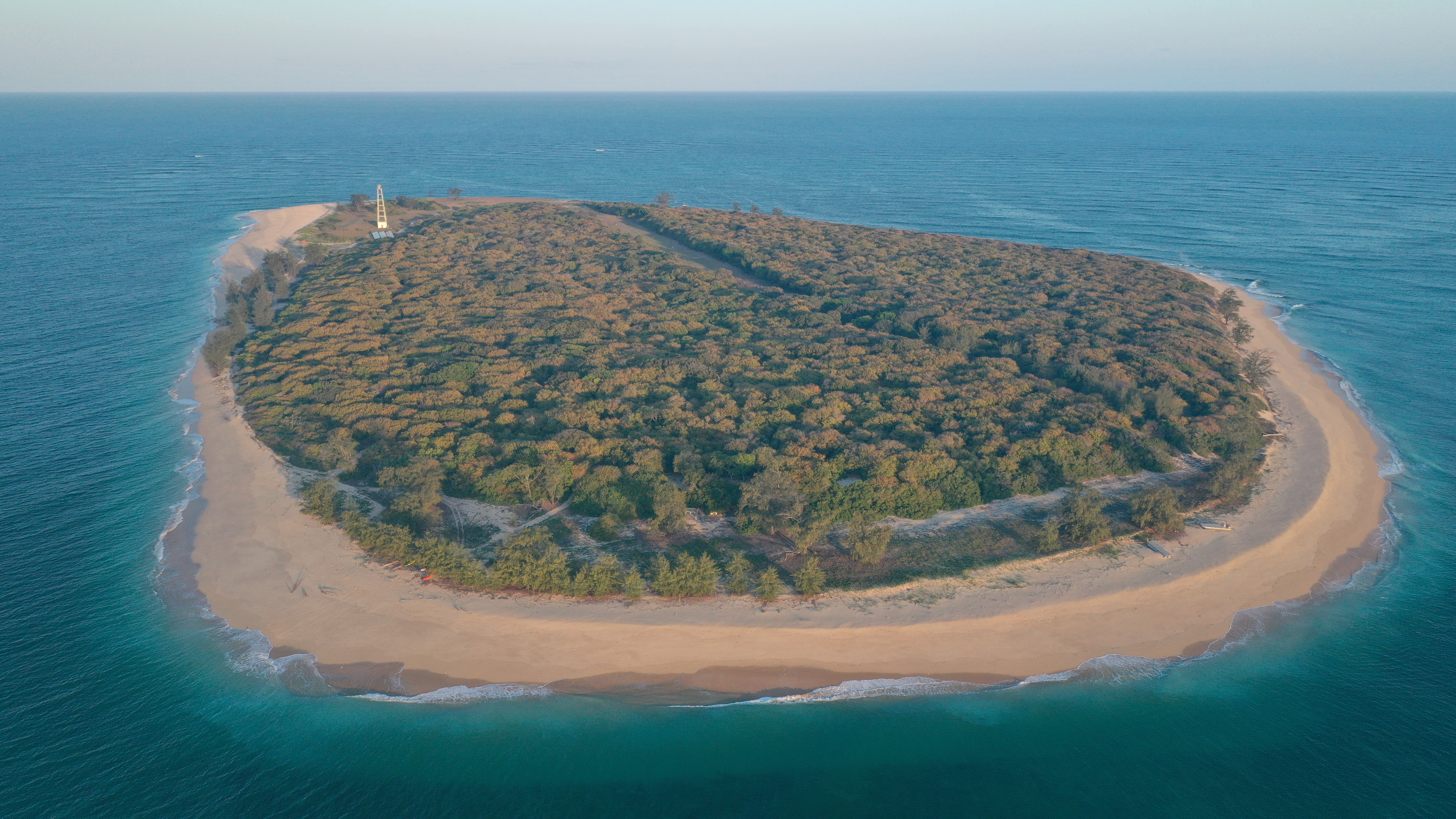
Drone footage of Ilha do Fogo, Zambezia, showing the island's solar plant.

Agricultural products include rice, maize, cassava, cashews, sugarcane, soybeans, coconuts, citrus, cotton, and tea. The country's largest tea estates are at Gurúè, while Lioma is a centre of soybean production. Fishing is especially productive of shrimp, and gemstones are mined at several sites.

Vasco da Gama landed at the site of Quelimane in 1498. Shortly after, the Portuguese established a permanent presence, and many moved up the Zambezi into the interior, for numerous years the furthest inland European presence (although over time there was much intermarrying, and few residents were of purely Portuguese descent).

== Districts ==
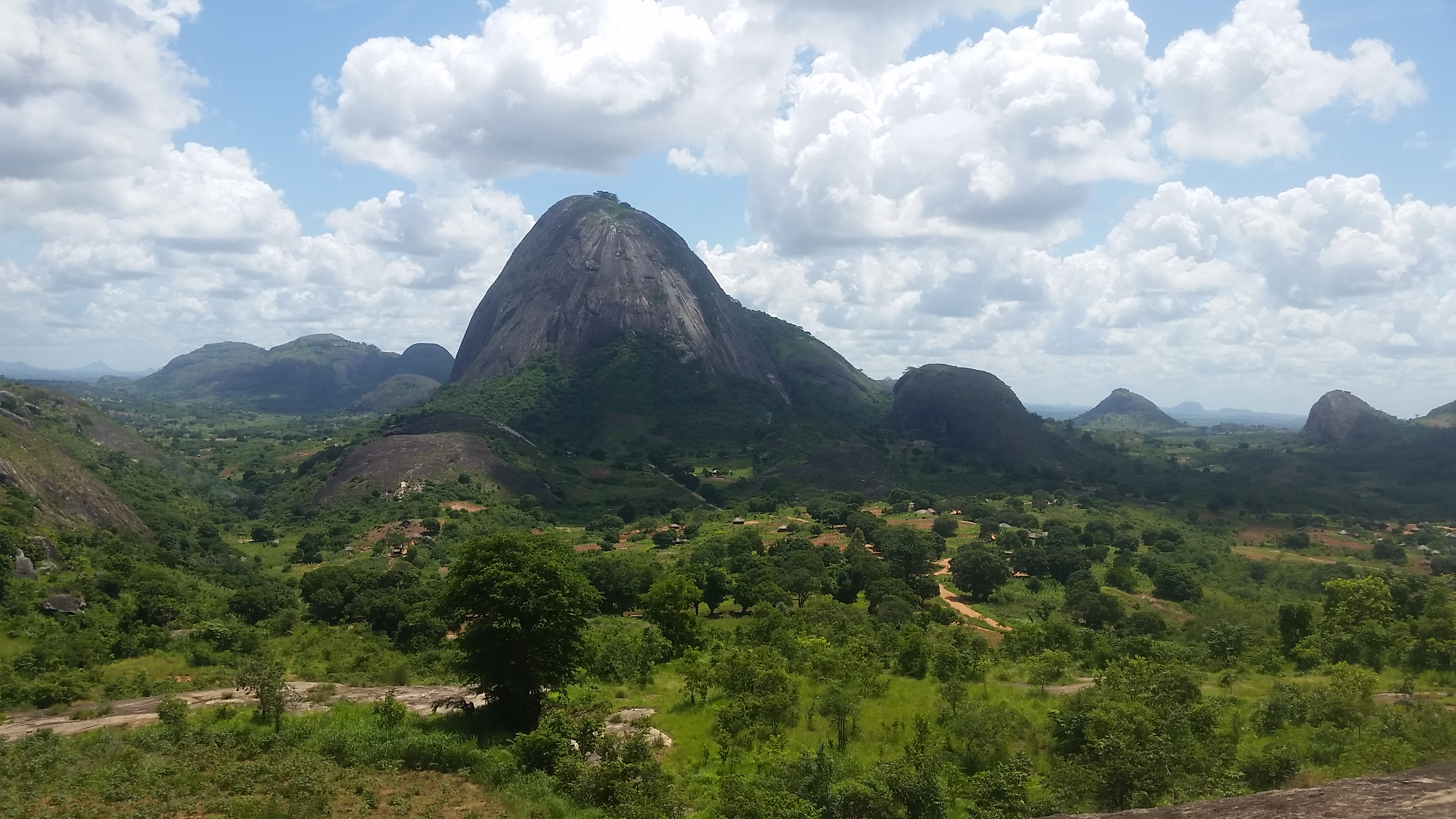
Mount Ile, Zambezia

Zambezia Province is divided into 16 districts:

- Alto Molocue District - with an area of 6,386 km^{2} and 278,064 people,
- Chinde District - with an area of 4,403 km^{2} and 121,173 people,
- Gilé District - with an area of 8,875 km^{2} and 168,962 people,
- Gurué District - with an area of 5,606 km^{2} and 302,948 people,
- Ile District - with an area of 5,589 km^{2} and 292,504 people,
- Inhassunge District - with an area of 745 km^{2} and 91,989 people,
- Lugela District - with an area of 6,178 km^{2} and 137,040 people,
- Maganja da Costa District - with an area of 7,597 km^{2} and 282,173 people,
- Milange District - with an area of 9,794 km^{2} and 515,029 people,
- Mocuba District - with an area of 8,867 km^{2} and 306,543 people,
- Mopeia District - with an area of 7,614 km^{2} and 115,614 people,
- Morrumbala District - with an area of 12,972 km^{2} and 361,896 people,
- Namacurra District - with an area of 1,798 km^{2} and 179,133 people,
- Namarroi District - with an area of 3,019 km^{2} and 127,651 people,
- Nicoadala District - with an area of 3,582 km^{2} and 232,929 people, and
- Pebane District - with an area of 9,985 km^{2} and 186,330 people.

In addition, there is one municipality - the city of Quelimane - with an area of 117 km^{2} and a population of 192,876.

The above district populations are from the provisional results of the September 2007 census.

== Demographics ==
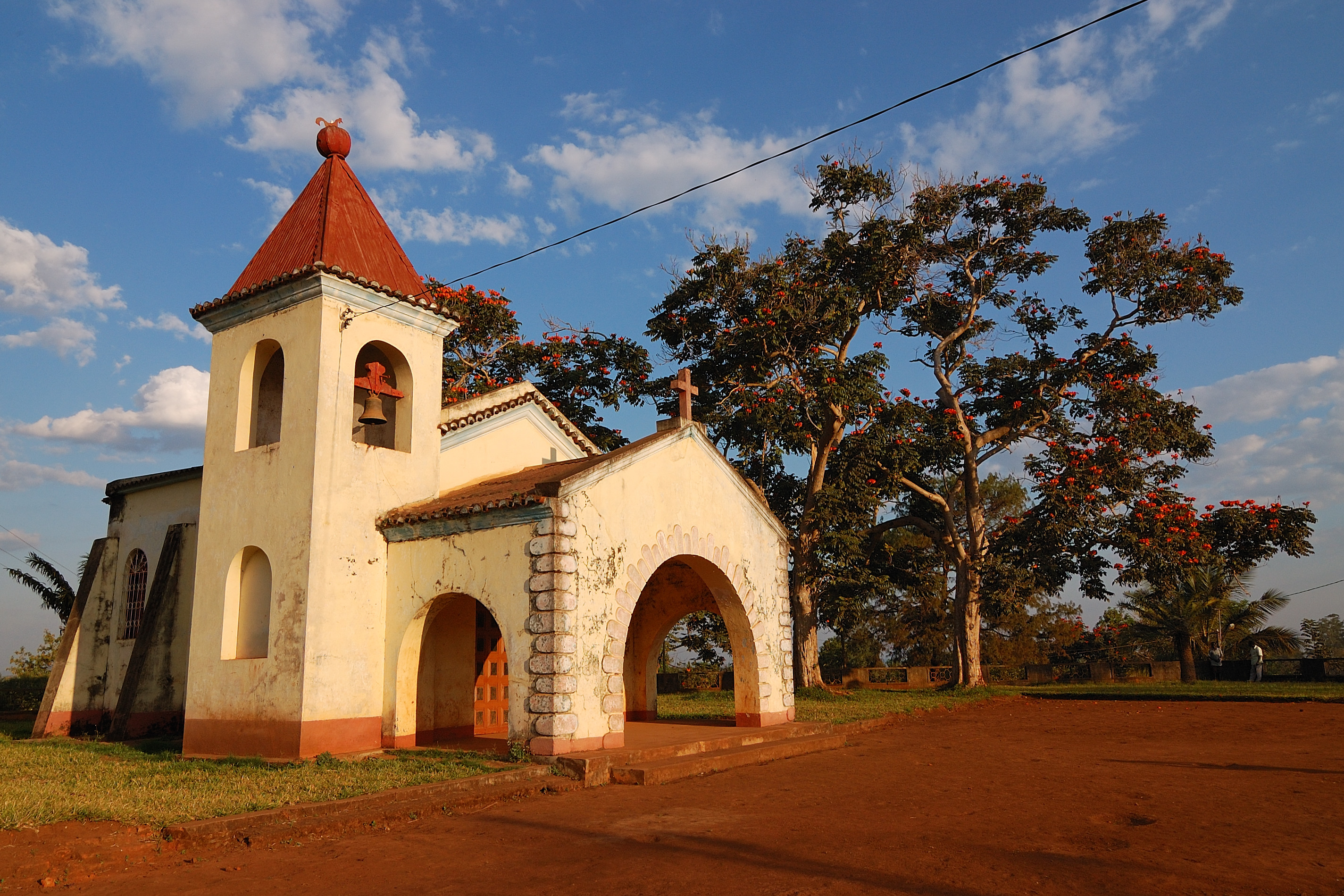
Chapel in Gurue

Historical population
Year	Pop.	±% p.a.
1980	2,500,200	—
1997	3,096,400	+1.27%
2007	3,890,453	+2.31%
2017	5,164,732	+2.87%
2020	5,567,252	+2.53%

== See also ==
- Postage stamps and postal history of Zambezia

== Bibliography ==
- Di Matteo, Filipe; Otsuki, Kei; Schoneveld, George (2016). "Soya bean expansion in Mozambique: exploring the inclusiveness and viability of soya business models as an alternative to the land grab". In Ashley Lau; Jonathan Melo; Silvana Rebaza; Gabriela Smarrelli; Andrea Villarreal Ojeda; Zachary Clemence (eds.). The Public Sphere. LSE Africa Summit Edition 2016. Challenging Conventions (PDF). London: London School of Economics. pp. 61–86. Archived from the original (PDF) on 2017-04-24.
