= List of Catholic dioceses in Mozambique =

The Roman Catholic Church in Mozambique is composed of three ecclesiastical provinces and nine suffragan dioceses.

== List of dioceses ==
=== Episcopal Conference of Mozambique ===
==== Ecclesiastical Province of Beira ====
- Archdiocese of Beira
  - Diocese of Chimoio
  - Diocese of Quelimane
  - Diocese of Tete
  - Diocese of Caia

==== Ecclesiastical Province of Maputo ====
- Archdiocese of Maputo
  - Diocese of Inhambane
  - Diocese of Xai-Xai

==== Ecclesiastical Province of Nampula ====
- Archdiocese of Nampula
  - Diocese of Alto Molócuè
  - Diocese of Gurué
  - Diocese of Lichinga
  - Diocese of Nacala
  - Diocese of Pemba
