= Hilário da Cruz Massinga =

Mozambican Roman Catholic prelate (born 1958)

The Most Reverend Hilário da Cruz Massinga
- Auxiliary Bishop of Inhambane, Mozambique
- Church: Catholic Church
- Archdiocese: Roman Catholic Archdiocese of Maputo
- See: Roman Catholic Diocese of Inhambane
- Appointed: 11 August 2023
- Installed: 11 August 2023
- Previous posts: 1. Bishop of Lichinga (5 April 2003 - 25 January 2008); 2. Bishop of Quelimane (25 January 2008 - 11 August 2023)

Orders
- Ordination: 9 January 1994
- Consecration: 15 June 2003 by Luís Gonzaga Ferreira da Silva

Personal details
- Born: Hilário da Cruz Massinga; 25 June 1958 (age 67) Banze/Chidenguele, Manjacaze District, Gaza Province, Mozambique
- Motto: "Eu Confio Na Mesericordia De Deus" (I trust in the mercy of God)

Styles of Hilário da Cruz Massinga
- Reference style: His Eminence
- Spoken style: Your Eminence
- Religious style: Monsignor

Hilário da Cruz Massinga OFM (born 25 June 1958) is a Mozambican prelate of the Catholic Church who is Auxiliary Bishop of the Roman Catholic Diocese of Inhambane, in Mozambique since 11 August 2023. From 25 January 2008 until 11 August 2023, he was bishop of the Diocese of Quelimane, Mozambique. Before that, he was bishop of the Diocese of Lichinga, Mozambique from 5 April 2003 until 25 January 2008. He was appointed bishop by Pope John Paul II. He was consecrated bishop on 15 June 2003. He is a professed member of the Catholic religious Order of Friars Minor. As auxiliary bishop, he is assigned the title of Titular Bishop of Chullu.

== Early life and education ==
He was born on 25 June 1958, at Banze, Manjacaze District, Diocese of Xai-Xai, Gaza Province, Mozambique. He attended the minor seminaries of the Franciscans in Amatongas and Chimoio from 1972 until 1975. He then completed secondary school in Inhambane and Maputo. He worked in the Mozambican Ministry of Labour for two years. He then completed 8 years of compulsory military service.

In 1986 he returned to Maputo and entered the Saint Pius X Major Seminary, thereby resuming his ecclesiastical formation. In 1987, he entered the "postulancy of the Friars Minor". He took the Franciscan habit in the novitiate of Marondera in Zimbabwe. He studied theology at a seminary in Pretoria, South Africa. On 10 January 1993, he made his perpetual oath as a Franciscan, in the Cathedral of Xai-Xai, Mozambique. He graduated with a Licentiate in Franciscan spirituality from the Pontifical University of Saint Anthony, in Rome, in 1996.

== Priest ==
On 9 January 1994, he was ordained a priest for the Order of Friars Minor (Franciscans) at the Cathedral of Xai-Xai by Bishop Júlio Duarte Langa. He served as a priest until 5 April 2003. While priest, he served in various roles and locations including as:

- Formator in the Saint Anthony Seminary in Chimoio, from 1997 until 1999.
- Parish priest of the cathedral of Chimoio, from 1997 until 1999.
- Elected Custodian of the Province of the Friars Minor of Mozambique from 1999 until 2003.

== Bishop ==
On 5 April 2003, Pope John Paul II appointed him bishop of the Diocese of Lichinga. He was consecrated bishop on 15 June 2003 by Luís Gonzaga Ferreira da Silva, Bishop Emeritus of Lichinga assisted by Júlio Duarte Langa, Bishop of Xai-Xai and Francisco Chimoio, Archbishop of Maputo. Bishop Massinga was installed at Lichinga on 29 June 2003.

On 25 January 2008, The Holy Father transferred Bishop Massinga to the Diocese of Quelimane, Mozambique, as the Local Ordinary. He was installed there on 30 March 2008. On 11 August 2023, Pope Francis transferred Bishop Massinga to the Diocese of Inhambane and appointed him Auxiliary Bishop there and concurrently assigned him Titular Bishop of Chullu.

== See also ==
- Catholic Church in Mozambique

== Succession table ==
Catholic Church titles
Preceded by	Auxiliary Bishop of Inhambane (since 11 August 2023)	Succeeded by
Preceded by Bernardo Filipe Governo (31 May 1976 - 10 Mar 2007)	Bishop of Quelimane (25 January 2008 - 11 Aug 2023 )	Succeeded by Osório Citora Afonso (since 25 July 2025)
Preceded by Luís Gonzaga Ferreira da Silva (10 November 1972 - 25 January 2003)	Bishop of Lichinga (5 April 2003 - 25 January 2008)	Succeeded by Atanasio Amisse Canira (since 8 February 2015)
