= Inácio Lucas Mwita =

Mozambican Catholic prelate (born 1969)

The Most Reverend Inácio Lucas Mwita
- Bishop of Gurué, Mozambique
- Church: Catholic Church
- Archdiocese: Roman Catholic Archdiocese of Nampula
- See: Roman Catholic Diocese of Gurué
- Appointed: 2 February 2021
- Installed: 21 March 2021
- Predecessor: Francisco Lerma Martínez
- Successor: Incumbent

Orders
- Ordination: 21 June 1998
- Consecration: 21 March 2021 by Germano Grachane
- Rank: Bishop

Personal details
- Born: Inácio Lucas Mwita; 21 September 1969 (age 56) Napaco, Diocese of Nampula, Nampula Province, Mozambique
- Motto: "In nomine Iesu Christi Nazareni, surge et ambula" (In the name of Jesus Christ of Nazareth, rise up and walk)

Styles of Inácio Lucas Mwita
- Reference style: Your Lordship; The Most Reverend
- Spoken style: His Lordship
- Religious style: Bishop

Inácio Lucas Mwita (born 21 September 1969) is a Mozambican Catholic prelate who is the bishop of the Roman Catholic Diocese of Gurué in Mozambique, since 2 February 2021. Before that, from 21 June 1998, until he was appointed bishop, he was a priest of the Roman Catholic Diocese of Nacala in Mozambique. He was appointed bishop by Pope Francis. He was consecrated bishop on 21 March 2021 at Gurué, Mozambique.

== Background and education ==
Inácio Lucas Mwita was born on 21 September 1969 in Napaco, in the Diocese of Nampula, Nampula Province, in Mozambique. He attended primary and secondary schools in Napaco, Namirôa and Mirrote from 1976 until 1984. He continued his studies at the Catholic Missionary School of São Daniele Comboni, in Carapira, Monapo, from 1985 until 1987. In 1988 he entered the São Carlos Lwanga Preparatory Seminary in Nampula. From 1990 until 1992, he studied philosophy in the Seminary of Matola. He transferred to the Seminary of Maputo, where he studied theology from 1993 until 1996. He holds a Licentiate in sacred liturgy awarded by the Pontifical Athenaeum of Saint Anselm in Rome, where he studied from 2001 until 2004.

== Priest ==
He was ordained a priest for the Diocese of Nacala on 21 June 1998. He served as a priest until 2 February 2021. While a priest, he served in various roles and locations, including as:

- Parish vicar of the Cathedral of Nacala from 1998 until 2001.
- Spiritual assistant of the Legion of Mary from 1998 until 2001.
- Teacher of Portuguese and history from 1998 until 2001.
- Diocesan secretarial official from 1998 until 2001.
- Diocesan head for vocations and for seminarians from 1998 until 2001.
- Studies in Rome leading to the award of a licentiate in sacred liturgy from the Pontifical Saint Anselm Athenaeum from 2001 until 2004.
- Parish vicar of the Cathedral of Nacala from 2004 until 2005.
- Vice rector and prefect of studies of the Santo Agostinho Philosophy Seminary of Matola from 2005 until 2011.
- Lecturer in liturgy in the Theological Seminary of Maputo from 2005 until 2011.
- Lecturer in liturgy in the Mother Mary Africa Institute of Higher Education from 2005 until 2011.
- Secretary of the Episcopal Commission for the Liturgy and the Episcopal Commission for the Clergy from 2011 until 2015.
- Rector of the Saint Pius X Interdiocesan Theological Seminary of Maputo from 2011 until 2015.
- Parish priest in solidum of Nossa Senhora da Assunção in Netia from 2015 until 2017.
- Vicar general of the diocese of Nacala from 2017 until 2021.
- Moderator priest of São João de Deus from 2017 until 2021.
- Rector of the Nossa Senhora Mãe de África Shrine in Alua from 2017 until 2021.

== Bishop ==
On 2 February 2021, Pope Francis appointed Reverend Monsignor Inácio Lucas Mwita of the clergy of Nacala as the new bishop of the diocese of Gurué, in Mozambique. He succeeded Bishop Francisco Lerma Martínez, who died in office on 24 April 2019.

He was consecrated bishop on 21 March 2021 at Santo António Cathedral, Gurué by Germano Grachane, Bishop Emeritus of Nacala assisted by Lucio Andrice Muandula, Bishop of Xai-Xai and Inácio Saure, Archbishop of Nampula.

== See also ==
- Catholic Church in Mozambique

== Succession table ==
Catholic Church titles
| Preceded by Francisco Lerma Martínez (24 March 2010 - 24 April 2019) | Bishop of Gurué (since 2 February 2021) | Succeeded by Incumbent |
