= Osório Citora Afonso =

Mozambican Catholic prelate (1972–2026)

The Most Reverend Osório Citora Afonso I.M.C.
- Bishop of Quelimane
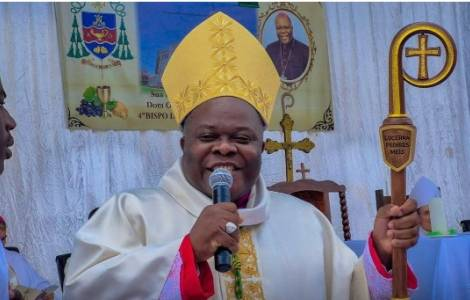
- Church: Catholic Church
- Archdiocese: Beira
- See: Quelimane
- Appointed: 25 July 2025
- Installed: 31 August 2025
- Term ended: 6 June 2026
- Predecessor: Hilário da Cruz Massinga
- Other post: Apostolic Administrator of Beira (10 April – 6 June 2026)
- Previous posts: Auxiliary Bishop of Maputo and Titular Bishop of Putia in Numidia (21 September 2023 – 25 July 2025)

Orders
- Ordination: 3 November 2002
- Consecration: 28 January 2024 by Luis Antonio Gokim Tagle, Inácio Saure and João Carlos Hatoa Nunes
- Rank: Bishop

Personal details
- Born: Osório Citora Afonso; 6 May 1972 Ribaue, Nampula Province, Portuguese Mozambique
- Died: 6 June 2026 (aged 54) Quelimane, Mozambique
- Cause of death: Gunshot wounds
- Motto: "Lucerna pedibus meis" (Your word is a lamp to my feet and a light to my path)
- Coat of arms: Osório Citora Afonso's coat of arms

Styles of Osório Citora Afonso
- Reference style: Your Eminence; The Most Reverend
- Spoken style: His Eminence
- Religious style: Bishop

Osório Citora Afonso, I.M.C. (6 May 1972 – 6 June 2026) was a Mozambican Catholic prelate who served as Bishop of Quelimane from 2025 until his murder in 2026. He was previously Auxiliary Bishop of Maputo from 2023 to 2025. He was a professed member of the Order of the Consolata Missionaries.

== Background and education ==
Afonso was born on 6 May 1972 in Ribaue, Diocese of Nampula, Nampula Province, in Portuguese Mozambique. He studied at the Christ the King Preparatory Seminary in Matola, Maputo. He studied Philosophy at the Saint Augustine Major Seminary in Matola. He then studied Theology at the Saint-Eugène de Mazenod Institute in Kinshasa, Democratic Republic of the Congo. He held a Licentiate in Sacred Scripture awarded by the Pontifical Biblical Institute in Rome, where he studied from 2006 until 2010. He also studied at the Hebrew University of Jerusalem from 2008 until 2009. From 2010 until 2011, he studied at the École Biblique et Archéologique Française, in Jerusalem.

== Priest ==
Afonso became a member of the religious Order of the Consolata Missionaries while at seminary. He took his perpetual vows of that Order on 17 June 2001. He was ordained a priest for his religious Order on 3 November 2002. He served as priest until 21 September 2023. While priest, he served in various roles and locations, including as:

- Parish vicar and treasurer of St. Hilaire in Kinshasa from 2002 until 2005.
- Regional councilor for the Democratic Republic of the Congo from 2005 until 2006.
- Studies for a licentiate in Sacred Scripture from the Pontifical Biblical Institute in Rome from 2006 until 2010.
- Studies at the Hebrew University of Jerusalem from 2008 until 2009.
- Studies at the École Biblique et Archéologique Française in Jerusalem from 2010 until 2011.
- Member of the Council of the General House in Rome from 2008 until 2010.
- Local collaborator at the Apostolic Nunciature in Kinshasa from 2011 until 2013.
- Formator and Treasurer of the Theological Seminary of Kinshasa from 2011 until 2013.
- Superior of the Missionary Center of the Diocese of Vittorio Veneto, Italy from 2014 until 2016.
- Superior of Casa Milaico in Treviso, Italy from 2014 until 2016.
- Regional Councilor for Italy, based in Treviso from 2016 until 2017.
- Formator at the International Theological Seminary of Bravetta, in Rome from 2016 until 2017.
- Official at the Dicastery for Evangelization, Section for First Evangelization and New Particular Churches from 2017 until 2023.

== Bishop ==
On 21 September 2023, Pope Francis appointed him Auxiliary Bishop of the Roman Catholic Archdiocese of Maputo. He concurrently assigned him Titular Bishop of Putia in Numidia. He was consecrated bishop on 28 January 2024 at Nampula by Cardinal Luis Antonio Gokim Tagle, Cardinal-Bishop of San Felice da Cantalice assisted by Inácio Saure, Archbishop of Nampula and João Carlos Hatoa Nunes, Archbishop of Maputo. While auxiliary bishop, he served as Secretary General of the Episcopal Conference of Mozambique.

On 25 July 2025, Pope Leo XIV transferred him to the Diocese of Quelimane in the Ecclesiastical Metropolitan Province of Beira and appointed him local ordinary there. His instantiation at Quelimane took place on 31 August 2025.

== Assassination ==
On 6 June 2026, Afonso was shot in the chest and killed by unidentified gunmen carrying an AKM-type firearm in the episcopal palace of Quelimane. He was 54. His assassination was met with shock and cries for justice from the Mozambican bishops and from Pope Leo XIV.

== See also ==
- Catholic Church in Mozambique

Catholic Church titles
Preceded by —	Auxiliary Bishop of Maputo (21 September 2023 – 25 July 2025)	Succeeded by —
Preceded by Cornelius Sim (20 October 2004 – 28 November 2020)	Titular Bishop of Putia in Numidia (21 September 2023 – 25 July 2025)	Succeeded by Gaspard Béby Gnéba (19 February 2026 – )
Preceded by Hilário da Cruz Massinga (25 January 2008 – 11 August 2023)	Bishop of Quelimane (25 July 2025 – 6 June 2026)	Succeeded by Vacant
