= Atanasio Amisse Canira =

Mozambican Catholic prelate (born 1962)

Most Reverend Atanasio Amisse Canira
- Bishop of Lichinga, Mozambique
- Church: Roman Catholic Church
- Archdiocese: Roman Catholic Archdiocese of Nampula
- Diocese: Roman Catholic Diocese of Lichinga
- Appointed: 8 February 2015
- Installed: 22 March 2015
- Predecessor: Elio Giovanni Greselin
- Successor: Incumbent

Personal details
- Born: 2 May 1962 (age 64) Mossoril, Diocese of Nacala, Mozambique

Styles of Atanasio Amisse Canira
- Reference style: Your Lordship; The Most Reverend
- Spoken style: His Lordship
- Religious style: Bishop

Atanasio Amisse Canira (born 2 May 1962), is a Mozambican Catholic prelate who is the Bishop of the Diocese of Lichinga in Mozambique, since 8 February 2015. Before that, from 12 December 1993 until he was appointed bishop, he was a priest of the Diocese of Nacala, in Mozambique. Pope Francis appointed him as Bishop of Lichinga, and he was consecrated bishop and installed at Lichinga, on 22 March 2015.

== Background and education ==
He was born on 2 May 1962, in Mossoril, Diocese of Nacala, Nampula Province, Mozambique. He attended elementary school in his home area. He studied at the Industrial and Commercial Joaquim Marra Chimoio High School, in Chimoio. He studied at the Mater Apostolorum Preparatory Seminary in Nampula, from 1984 until 1986. He attended the Saint Agostinho Major Seminary in Matola from 1987 until 1989. He then transferred to Saint Pio X Interdiocesan Theological Seminary in Maputo, studying there from 1990 until 1993. He holds a Licentiate in Moral Theology and Spirituality awarded by the Pontifical Alphonsian Academy in Rome, where he studied from 1996 until 1998.

== Priest ==
He was ordained a priest for the Diocese of Nacala on 12 December 1993. He served as a priest until 8 February 2015. As a priest, he served in various roles and locations, including as:

- Pastor in solidum in the parish of Nossa Senhora da Paz in Namapa from 1994 until 1996.
- Studies in Rome, leading to the award of a Licentiate in Moral Theology and Spirituality at the Saint Alfonsiana Academy from 1996 until 1998.
- Pastor of the Cathedral in Nacala from 1998 until 2001.
- Spiritual Director of the Saint Pio X Interdiocesan Theological Major Seminary in Maputo from 2002 until 2007.
- Pastor of the parish of Nossa Senhora da Purificação in Ilha de Moçambique from 2008 until 2015.
- Vicar General of the Diocese of Nacala from 2010 until 2015.
- Episcopal Vicar for the Family, from 2010 until 2015.
- National Director of the Pontifical Mission Societies (PMS) in Mozambique for the period 2009 until 2014.

== Bishop ==
On 8 February 2015, Pope Francis appointed him Bishop of the Diocese of Lichinga, Mozambique. He succeeded Bishop Elio Giovanni Greselin, whose age related retirement was accepted by The Holy Father and took effect that same day.

He was consecrated bishop at Lichinga on 22 March 2015 by Germano Grachane, Bishop of Nacala assisted by Elio Giovanni Greselin, Bishop Emeritus of Lichinga and Lucio Andrice Muandula, Bishop of Xai-Xai. Bishop Atanasio Amisse Canira is the chairman of the Episcopal Commission for Migrants, Refugees and Displaced Persons (CEMIRDE) of the Episcopal Conference of Mozambique.

== See also ==
- Catholic Church in Mozambique

== Succession table ==
Catholic Church titles
Preceded by Elio Giovanni Greselin (30 December 2008 - 8 February 2015)	Bishop of Lichinga (since 8 February 2015)	Succeeded by Incumbent
