= Ernesto Maguengue =

Mozambican Catholic prelate (born 1964)

The Most Reverend Ernesto Maguengue
- Bishop of Inhambane, Mozambique
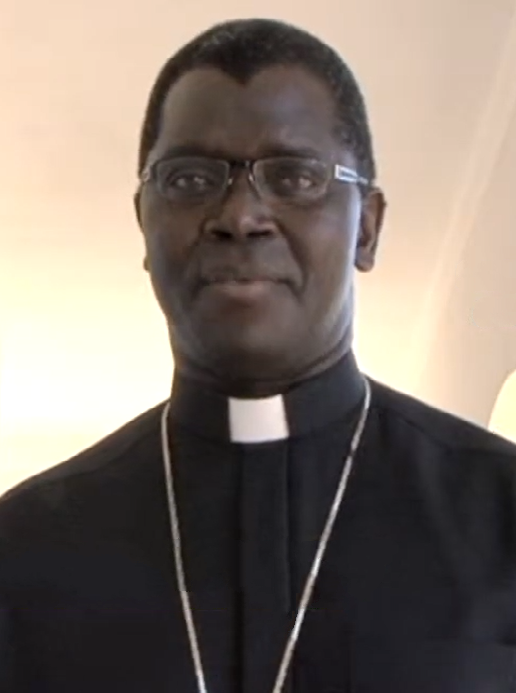
- Bishop Maguengue in 2015
- Church: Catholic Church
- Archdiocese: Roman Catholic Archdiocese of Maputo
- See: Roman Catholic Diocese of Inhambane
- Appointed: 4 April 2022
- Installed: 29 May 2022
- Predecessor: Adriano Langa
- Successor: Incumbent
- Other posts: 1. Bishop of Pemba (24 June 2004 - 27 October 2012); 2. Auxiliary Bishop of Nampula (6 August 2014 - 4 April 2022); 3. Titular Bishop of Furnos Minor (6 August 2014 - 4 April 2022); 4. Apostolic Administrator of Nampula (25 July 2016 - 11 June 2017).

Orders
- Ordination: 14 May 1989 by Alexandre José Maria Cardinal dos Santos
- Consecration: 24 October 2004 by Cardinal Alexandre José Maria dos Santos

Personal details
- Born: Ernesto Maguengue; 2 August 1964 (age 62) Chidenguele, Diocese of Xai-Xai, Gaza Province, Mozambique

Styles of Ernesto Maguengue
- Reference style: His Eminence
- Spoken style: Your Eminence
- Religious style: Monsignor

Ernesto Maguengue (born 2 August 1964) is a Mozambican Roman Catholic prelate, who is the Bishop of the Roman Catholic Diocese of Inhambane, in Mozambique, since 4 April 2022. Before that, from 6 August 2014 until 4 April 2022, he was Auxiliary Bishop of Nampula and Titular Bishop of Furnos Minor. Prior to then, from 24 June 2004 until 27 October 2012, he was the Bishop of the Roman Catholic Diocese of Pemba, in Mozambique. He was appointed bishop on 24 June 2004 by Pope John Paul II. He resigned at Pemba on 27 October 2012. He was transferred to Nampula on 6 August 2014. While auxiliary bishop there, he served as Apostolic Administrator of that dioces between 25 July 2016 and 11 June 2017. Pope Francis transferred him to Inhambane, as the local ordinary on 2 April 2022. He was installed there on 29 May 2022.

== Background and education ==
He was born on 2 August 1964 at Chidenguele, Diocese of Xai-Xai, Gaza Province, Mozambique. He studied philosophy and theology at seminary in his home country. He holds a doctorate in theology, obtained from the Pontifical Gregorian University in Rome, where he studied from 1992 until 1998.

== Priest ==
He was ordained a priest for the archdiocese of Maputo, on 14 May 1989 by Alexandre José Maria dos Santos, O.F.M., Archbishop of Maputo. He served as a priest until 24 June 2004. While a priest, he served in various roles and locations, including as:

- Assistant priest from 1989 until 1992.
- Head of the archdiocesan Pastoral Office from 1989 until 1992.
- Lecturer at the Seminary for Philosophy in Maputo from 1989 until 1992.
- Studies at the Pontifical Gregorian University, in Rome, leading to the award of a doctorate in theology, from 1992 until 1998.
- Vice rector of the St Pius X inter-diocesan seminary from 1999 until 2000.
- Rector of the St Pius X inter-diocesan seminary from 2000 until 2004.
- Lecturer at the Saint Augustine Seminary since 2000.
- Lecturer at the Mãe da Africa Higher Institute since 2000.

== Bishop ==
On 24 June 2004, Pope John Paul II appointed Reverend Ernesto Maguengue of the clergy of Maputo, as bishop of the Diocese of Pemba, Mozambique. He was consecrated on 24 October 2004 at Maputo by Cardinal Alexandre José Maria dos Santos, Cardinal-Priest of San Frumenzio ai Prati Fiscali assisted by Francisco Chimoio, Archbishop of Maputo and Júlio Duarte Langa, Bishop Emeritus of Xai-Xai.

On 27 October 2012, Bishop Ernesto Maguengue, resigned from the pastoral governance of the Diocese of Pemba in Mozambique and Pope Benedict XVI, accepted that resignation on that day. On 6 August 2014, Pope Francis appointed him as auxiliary bishop of the Roman Catholic Diocese of Nampula and assigned him Titular Bishop of Fornos Minore. On 25 July 2016, following the age-related resignation of Bishop Tomé Makhweliha, S.C.I., The Holy Father appointed Bishop Ernesto Maguengue, the auxiliary bishop of that archdiocese as the Apostolic Administrator of the archdiocese of Nampula, in Mozambique. That administratorship ceased on 11 June 2017.

On 4 April 2022, The Holy Father transferred Bishop Ernesto Maguengue from Nampula to the Roman Catholic Diocese of Inhambane in Mozambique and appointed him the new bishop there. He succeeded Bishop Adriano Langa who retired, having attained the retirement age for Catholic bishops. Bishop Ernesto Maguengue was installed at Inhambane, Mozambique on 29 May 2022.

== See also ==
- Catholic Church in Mozambique

== Succession table ==
Catholic Church titles
Preceded by Adriano Langa (7 September 2006 - 4 April 2022)	Bishop of Inhambane (since 4 April 2022)	Succeeded by Incumbent
Preceded by	Auxiliary Bishop of Nampula (6 August 2014 - 4 April 2022)	Succeeded by
Preceded by Francisco Chimoio (5 December 2000 - 22 February 2003)	Bishop of Pemba (24 June 2004 - 27 October 2012)	Succeeded by Luiz Fernando Lisboa (12 June 2013 - 11 February 2021)
