= Episcopal Conference of Mozambique =

Assembly of Catholic bishops

The Episcopal Conference of Mozambique (Portuguese: Conferencia Episcopal de Moçambique, CEM) is the episcopal conference of the Catholic Church in Mozambique. The CEM is a member of the Inter-Regional Meeting of Bishops of Southern Africa (IMBISA) and Symposium of Episcopal Conferences of Africa and Madagascar (SECAM).

== List of presidents of the Bishops' Conference ==
1967–1969: Custódio Alvim Pereira, Archbishop of Maputo

1969–1975: Francisco Nunes Teixeira, Bishop of Quelimane

1975–1976: Manuel Vieira Pinto, Archbishop of Nampula

1976–1986: Jaime Pedro Gonçalves, Archbishop of Beira

1986–1993: Paulo Mandlate, Bishop of Tete

1993–2002: Francisco João Silota, Bishop of Chimoio

2002–2006: Jaime Pedro Gonçalves, Archbishop of Beira

2006–2009: Tume Makhweliha, Archbishop of Nampula

From 2009: Lucio Andrice Muandula, Bishop of Xai-Xai

== See also ==
- Catholic Church in Mozambique
