= Alberto Vera Aréjula =

Spanish Catholic prelate (born 1957)

The Most Reverend Alberto Vera Aréjula
- Bishop of Nacala, Mozambique
- Church: Catholic Church
- Archdiocese: Roman Catholic Archdiocese of Nampula
- See: Roman Catholic Diocese of Nacala
- Appointed: 25 April 2018
- Installed: 25 April 2018
- Predecessor: Germano Grachane
- Successor: Incumbent
- Other post: Auxiliary Bishop of Xai-Xai (30 March 2015 - 25 April 2018)

Orders
- Ordination: 22 August 1981 by Amadeu González Ferreiros
- Consecration: 2 May 2015 by Lucio Andrice Muandula
- Rank: Bishop

Personal details
- Born: Alberto Vera Aréjula; 4 April 1957 (age 69) Aguilar del Río Alhama, Spain
- Motto: Gaudete in Domino semper ("Rejoice in the Lord always")

Styles of Alberto Vera Aréjula
- Reference style: Your Lordship; The Most Reverend
- Spoken style: His Lordship
- Religious style: Bishop

Alberto Vera Aréjula O. de M. (born 8 April 1957) is a Spanish Roman Catholic prelate who is the bishop of the Roman Catholic Diocese of Nacala in Mozambique since 25 April 2018. Before that, from 30 March 2015 until 25 April 2018, he was Auxiliary Bishop of the Roman Catholic Diocese of Xai-Xai in Mozambique. He was appointed bishop by Pope Francis and was assisgned Titular Bishop of Nova Barbara. He was consecrated bishop at Xai-Xai on 2 May 2015. On 25 April 2018, The Holy Father transferred him to Nacala to succeed Bishop Germano Grachane, whose age-related resignation was accepted that same day. He is a professed member of the Order of the Blessed Virgin Mary of Mercy.

== Background and education ==
He was born on 8 April 1957 in Aguilar del Río Alhama, in the Roman Catholic Diocese of Calahorra y La Calzada-Logroño in Spain. He holds a Bachelor's degree in Theology and a Licentiate in Systematic Theology from the Faculty of Theology of Catalunya in Barcelona. He also studied Psychology at the University of Valencia.

== Priest ==
On 25 September 1975, he took his preliminary vows as a member of the Order of Our Lady of Mercy. He took his solemn vows of that order on 19 March 1981. He was ordained a deacon by Elías Yanes Alvarez, Archbishop of Zaragoza on 11 April 1981. On 22 August 1981, he was ordained a priest for his religious Order, by Amadeu González Ferreiros, Titular Bishop of Metrae. He served as a priest until 30 March 2015. As a priest he served in various roles and locations including:

- Vicar of the Parish of Nuestra Senora de El Puig in Valencia, Spain from 1982 until 1985.
- Formator of postulants and promoter of vocations in the Vicariate of Central America in Guatemala from 1986 until 1994.
- Vicar of the Parish of San José Obrero Castellón from 1994 until 1997.
- Elected provincial counsellor and head of youth and vocational pastoral ministry for the Province of Aragon from 1994 until 1997.
- Formator in the Community of Reus from 1997 until 2000.
- Superior of the Community of Matola-Mozambique from 2000 until 2013.
- Rector of studies of the Mercedarian Seminary in Mozambique from 2000 until 2013.
- Parish priest of Nossa Senhora do Livramento from 2000 until 2013.
- Primary and secondary school director from 2000 until 2013.
- Diocesan counsellor for Caritas in Maputo, Mozambique from 2000 until 2013.
- Provincial delegate for the Mercedarian Fathers in Mozambique since 2000.
- Superior of the new Community of Xai-Xai, Mozambique, in the new Parish Nossa Senhora das Merces, from 2013 until 2015.

== Bishop ==
On 30 March 2015, Pope Francis appointed him auxiliary bishop of the Diocese of Xai-Xai. He was concurrently assigned Titular Bishop of Nova Barbara. He was consecrated bishop at Xai-Xai on 2 May 2015 by Lucio Andrice Muandula, Bishop of Xai-Xai assisted by Francisco Chimoio, Archbishop of Maputo and Germano Grachane, Bishop of Nacala.

On 25 April 2018, The Holy Father accepted the age-related retirement from the pastoral administration of the Diocese of Nacala in Mozambique. He appointed Bishop Alberto Vera Aréjula, O. de M., previously auxiliary bishop at Xai-Xai, as the new Local Ordinary as Nacala. He continues to serve in that capacity under very difficult security and social environments.

== See also ==
- Catholic Church in Mozambique

== Succession table ==
Catholic Church titles
Preceded by	Auxiliary Bishop of Xai-Xai (30 March 2015 - 25 April 2018)	Succeeded by
Preceded by Germano Grachane (11 October 1991 - 25 April 2018)	Bishop of Nacala (since 25 April 2018)	Succeeded by Incumbent
