= António Juliasse Ferreira Sandramo =

Mozambican Catholic prelate (born 1968)

The Most Reverend António Juliasse Ferreira Sandramo
- Bishop of Pemba, Mozambique
- Church: Catholic Church
- Archdiocese: Roman Catholic Archdiocese of Nampula
- See: Roman Catholic Diocese of Pemba
- Appointed: 8 March 2022
- Installed: 21 May 2022
- Predecessor: Luiz Fernando Lisboa
- Successor: Incumbent
- Other posts: 1. Auxiliary Bishop of Maputo (7 December 2018 – 8 March 2022); 2. Apostolic Administrator of Pemba (11 February 2021 – 8 March 2022)

Orders
- Ordination: 28 June 1998
- Consecration: 17 February 2019 by Francisco Chimoio
- Rank: Bishop

Personal details
- Born: António Juliasse Ferreira Sandramo; 20 March 1968 (age 58) Soalpo, Diocese of Chimoio, Manica Province, Mozambique

Styles of António Juliasse Ferreira Sandramo
- Reference style: Your Lordship; The Most Reverend
- Spoken style: His Lordship
- Religious style: Bishop

António Juliasse Ferreira Sandramo (born 20 March 1968) is a Mozambican Catholic prelate who is the bishop of the Roman Catholic Diocese of Pemba, in Mozambique, since 8 March 2022. Before that, from 7 December 2018, until 8 March 2022, he was auxiliary bishop of the Roman Catholic Archdiocese of Maputo. He was appointed bishop by Pope Francis. He was concurrently appointed Titular Bishop of Arsennaria, while auxiliary bishop. He was consecrated bishop on 17 February 2019. From 11 February 2021 until 8 March 2022, he served as Apostolic Administrator of Pemba Diocese. The Holy Father transferred him to Pemba and appointed him the local ordinary of that diocese, on 8 March 2022. He was installed at Pemba, Mozambique on 21 May 2022.

== Background and education ==
He was born in Soalpo, Diocese of Chimoio, Manica Province, Mozambique on 20 March 1968. He attended elementary and secondary schools in his home area. From 1988 until 1989, he studied at the Good Shepherd Propaedeutic Seminary in Beira. He transferred to the Saint Augustine Inter-diocesan Philosophy Seminary in Matola, where he studied philosophy from 1990 until 1992. He then studied Theology at the Saint Pius X Inter-diocesan Theology Seminary in Maputo between 1993 and 1996. He holds a Licentiate in Dogmatic Theology, awarded by the Catholic University of Portugal. He also holds a Licentiate in Anthropology, awarded by the NOVA University Lisbon. His master's degree in African Studies was awarded by the ISCTE – University Institute of Lisbon. He studied in Portugal from 2005 until 2009, while pursuing those three advanced degrees.

== Priest ==
On 28 June 1998, he was ordained a priest for the Diocese of Chimoio. He served as a priest until 7 December 2018. As a priest, he served in various roles and locations including as:

- Parish vicar Nossa Senhora Rainha do Moudo in Dombe from 1998 until 2002.
- Parish vicar Nossa Senhora das Reliquias in Sussundenga from 1998 until 2002.
- Coordinator of the diocesan Liturgy Commission from 1998 until 2001.
- Coordinator of the diocesan Commission for Youth from 2001 until 2003.
- Parish Administrator São Pedro e São Paulo in Marera from 2002 until 2005.
- Director of the Polyvalent Centre from 2002 until 2005.
- Cofounder of Kimatsirama, a non-profit association for the prevention of HIV/AIDS and the assistance of young people with the infection between 2002 and 2005.
- Cofounder of Cadeia de Solidariedade, a non-profit association to assist young people in situations of poverty and abandonment between 2002 and 2005.
- Studies in Portugal, for three advanced degrees, as detailed in the previous section from 2005 until 2009.
- Parish priest at São Paulo and São Jerônimo in Soalpo from 2010 until 2014.
- Coordinator of Diocesan Pastoral Office from 2010 until 2014.
- Dean of diocesan priests in Chimoio from 2010 until 2018.
- Parish priest of the Diocesan Cathedral.
- Episcopal Vicar Central Zone.
- Member of the diocesan Council of Presbyters.
- Secretary of the Bishops' Episcopal Commission for culture.
- Docent of Anthropology at the Catholic University of Mozambique.

== Bishop ==
On 7 December 2018, Pope Francis appointed Reverend Father António Juliasse Ferreira Sandramo, a member of the clergy of Chimoio as auxiliary bishop of the Archdiocese of Maputo, Mozambique. The Holy Father concurrently assigned him Titular Bishop of Arsennaria. He was consecrated on 17 February 2019 at Chimoio by Francisco Chimoio, Archbishop of Maputo assisted by Francisco João Silota, Bishop Emeritus of Chimoio and Lucio Andrice Muandula, Bishop of Xai-Xai.

On 8 March 2022, The Holy Father transferred Bishop António Juliasse Ferreira Sandramo, previously Auxiliary Bishop of Maputo as the new bishop of Pemba Diocese in the north of Mozambique. He was installed at Pemba on 21 May 2022. While auxiliary bishop, he served as Apostolic Administrator at Pemba from 11 February 2021 until 8 March 2022. As of 2024, he continues to administer the Diocese of Pemba, as the local ordinary amid tough security and social environments.

== See also ==
- Catholic Church in Mozambique

== Succession table ==
Catholic Church titles
Preceded by	Auxiliary Bishop of Maputo (7 December 2018 – 8 March 2022)	Succeeded by
Preceded by Luiz Fernando Lisboa (12 June 2013 – 11 February 2021)	Bishop of Pemba (since 8 March 2022)	Succeeded by Incumbent
