= Alberto Setele =

Mozambican clergyman

- Bishop of Inhambane
- Church: Catholic Church
- Diocese: Diocese of Inhambane
- In office: 20 November 1975 – 7 September 2006
- Predecessor: Ernesto Gonçalves da Costa
- Successor: Adriano Langa

Orders
- Ordination: 9 August 1964
- Consecration: 8 February 1976 by Alexandre José Maria dos Santos

Personal details
- Born: 22 November 1935 Zavala, Colony of Mozambique, Portuguese Empire
- Died: 7 September 2006 (aged 70)

Alberto Setele (22 November 1935, Zavala – 7 September 2006) was a Mozambican clergyman, Roman Catholic Bishop of Inhambane.

Setele was ordained as a priest on 9 August 1964. On 20 November 1975 he was appointed Bishop of Inhambane by Pope Paul VI. The Archbishop of Maputo, Alexandre José Maria dos Santos, consecrated him on 8 February 1976 as bishop, along with Bishop of Beira, Ernesto Gonçalves da Costa, and Januário Machaze Nhangumbe, Bishop of Pemba. He died on 7 September 2006 at the age of 70.
