= Germano Grachane =

Mozambican clergyman (born 1942)

Germano Grachane C.M.
- Bishop Emeritus of Nacala
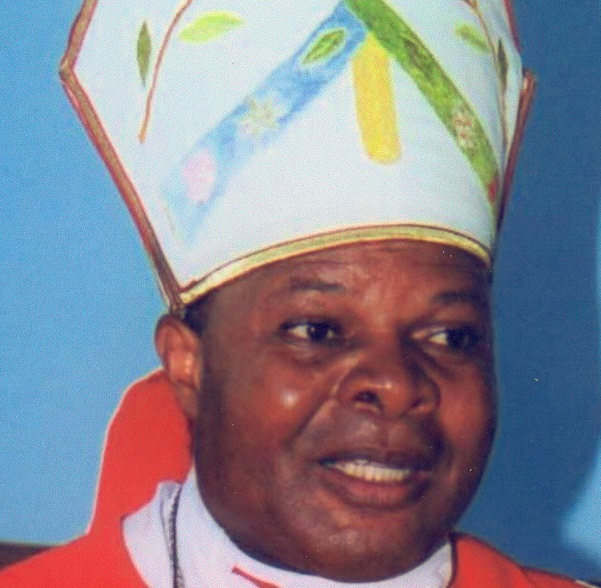
- Germano Grachane, seen in 2000
- Church: Catholic Church
- Diocese: Diocese of Nacala
- In office: 11 October 1991 – 25 April 2018
- Predecessor: Diocese erected
- Successor: Alberto Vera Aréjula
- Other post: Apostolic Administrator of Gurúè (2019-2021)
- Previous posts: Titular Bishop of Thunusuda (1990-1991); Auxiliary Bishop of Nampula (1990-1991)

Orders
- Ordination: 24 May 1970
- Consecration: 3 June 1990 by Manuel Vieira Pinto

Personal details
- Born: 4 May 1942 (age 84) Zandamela (west of Zavala), Colony of Mozambique, Portuguese Empire

Germano Grachane C.M. (born 4 May 1942 in Zandamela, Zavala District) is a Mozambican clergyman, who is the Bishop of Nacala. He was ordained a priest of the Congregation of the Vincentians on 24 May 1970. On 22 January 1990 Pope John Paul II appointed him auxiliary bishop in Nampula and Titular Bishop of Thunusuda. He received his episcopal consecration as Archbishop of Nampula from Manuel Vieira Pinto, on 3 June of that year; Co-consecrators were Paulo Mandlate, Bishop of Tete, and Júlio Duarte Langa, Bishop of Xai-Xai. On 11 October 1991 he was appointed Bishop of Nacala.
