= João Carlos Hatoa Nunes =

Mozambican Catholic prelate (born 1968)

The Most Reverend João Carlos Hatoa Nunes
- Archbishop of Maputo, Mozambique
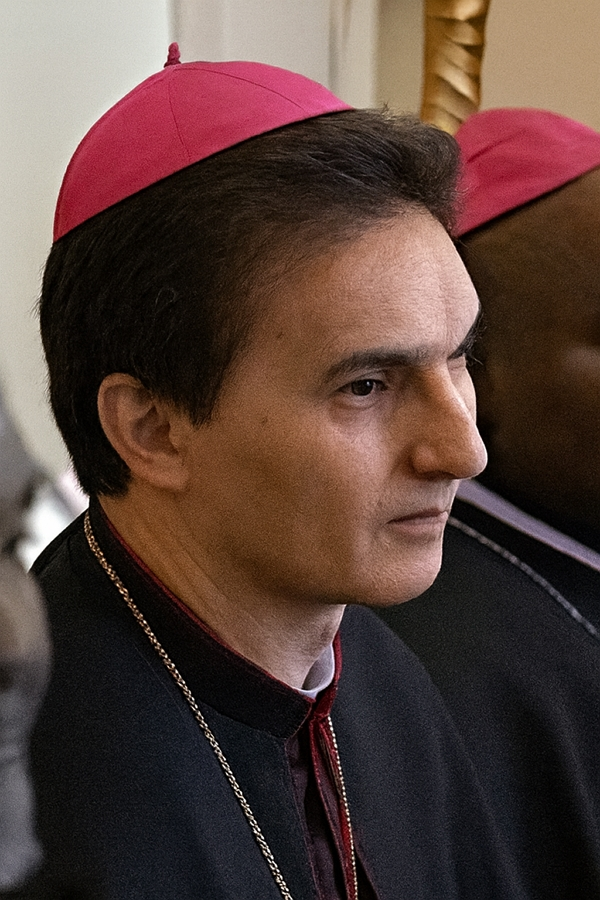
- Church: Roman Catholic Church
- Archdiocese: Roman Catholic Archdiocese of Maputo
- See: Maputo
- Appointed: 15 November 2022
- Installed: 5 May 2023
- Predecessor: Francisco Chimoio
- Previous posts: 1.Coadjutor Archbishop of Maputo (15 November 2022 - 5 May 2023); 2. Bishop of Chimoio (2 January 2017 - 15 November 2022); 3. Apostolic Administrator of Beira (14 January 2012 - 29 June 2012); 4. Titular Bishop of Amudarsa (25 May 2011 - 2 January 2017); 5. Auxiliary Bishop of Maputo (25 May 2011 - 2 January 2017)

Orders
- Ordination: 17 July 1995
- Consecration: 10 July 2011 by Francisco Chimoio

Personal details
- Born: João Carlos Hatoa Nunes; 8 March 1968 (age 58) Beira, Sofala Province, Mozambique
- Motto: "Estou em meio a vós como aquele que serve" (In the midst of you as one who serves)

Styles of João Carlos Hatoa Nunes
- Reference style: Your Eminence; The Most Reverend
- Spoken style: His Eminence
- Religious style: Bishop

João Carlos Hatoa Nunes (born 8 March 1968) is a Mozambican Catholic prelate who is the Archbishop of Roman Catholic Archdiocese of Maputo, Mozambique since 5 May 2023. Before that, he was Coadjutor Bishop of Maputo from 15 November 2022 until 5 May 2023. From 2 January 2017 until 15 November 2022 he was the Bishop of the Diocese of Chimoio, Mozambique. Before that, he served as Auxiliary Bishop of Maputo, from 25 May 2011 until 2 January 2017. While auxiliary bishop, he was assigned Titular Buishop of Amudarsa. From 14 January 2012 until 29 June 2012, while auxiliary at Maputo, he contemporaneously was Apostolic Administrator of the Archdiocese of Beira, in Mozambique. He was appointed bishop by Pope Benedict XVI. He was consecrated bishop on 10 July 2011 at Maputo.

== Early life and education ==
He was born on 8 March 1968 in Beira, Archdiocese of Beira, Sofala Province, in Mozambique. He attended primary school from 1975 until 1978 and secondary school from 1979 until 1985, both in Mozambique. In 1986 he entered the Cristo Rei Middle Seminary in Maputo, studying there until 1988. He studied Philosophy at the Saint Agostinho Interdiocesan Philosophical Seminary in Matola from 1988 until 1990. He then transferred to the Saint Pius X Interdiocesan Theological Seminary in Maputo, where he studied Theology from 1990 until 1994. He graduated from there with a Bachelor in Theology. He holds an advanced degree in Planning, Administration and Management Education awarded by the Pedagogical University of Maputo, where he studied from 2007 until 2009.

== Priest ==
He was ordained a priest for the Archdiocese of Maputo on 17 July 1995. He served as a priest until 25 May 2011. While priest, he served in various roles and locations including as:

- Assistant priest of the parish, Nossa Senhora das Graças from 1995 until 1997.
- Chancellor and Treasurer of the Archdiocese of Maputo from 1995 until 1997.
- Director of Radio Maria Moçambique from 2003 until 2006.
- Assistant priest of the Church Cathedral of Maputo from 2005 until 2007.
- Pastor of the parish São Francisco de Assis from 2007 until 2008.
- Studies at the Pedagogical University of Mozambique, leading to the award of an advanced degree in education planning, administration and management from 2007 until 2009.
- Episcopal Vicar for the Southern Region, Chancellor of the Curia in the Archdiocese of Maputo from 2009 until 2011.
- Parish priest of São Francisco de Assis Parish, from 2009 until 2011.
- General Pro-Vicar of the Archdiocese of Maputo as at May 2011.

== Bishop ==
Pope Benedict XVI appointed him auxiliary bishop of Maputo Archdiocese on 25 May 2011. He was concurrently assigned Titular Bishop of Amudarsa. He was consecrated bishop at Maputo on 10 July 2011 by Francisco Chimoio, Archbishop of Maputo assisted by Adriano Langa, Bishop of Inhambane and Lucio Andrice Muandula, Bishop of Xai-Xai. While auxiliary bishop at Maputo, he served as apostolic administrator of the Roman Catholic Archdiocese of Beira from 14 January 2012 until 29 June 2012.

On 2 January 2017, Pope Francis transferred Bishop João Carlos Hatoa Nunes from Maputo to the Diocese of Chimoio in the Archdiocese of Beira. He succeeded Bishop Francisco João Silota, whose age-related retirement was accepted by The Holy Father and took effect that same day.

== Archbishop of Maputo ==
On 15 November 2022, Pope Francis appointed Nunes as Coadjutor Archbishop of Maputo. He was installed on 15 January 2023. Nunes automatically became Archbishop of Maputo on 5 May 2023 when Archbishop Francisco Chimoio retired. As of 2025, he is still the archbishop of the archdiocese of Maputo, Mozambique.

== See also ==
- Catholic Church in Mozambique

== Succession table ==
Catholic Church titles
Preceded by	Auxiliary Bishop of Maputo (25 May 2011 - 2 January 2017)	Succeeded by
Preceded by Francisco João Silota (19 November 1990 - 2 January 2017)	Bishop of Chimoio (2 January 2017 - 15 November 2022)	Succeeded by Vacant
Preceded by	Coadjutor Archbishop of Maputo (15 November 2022 - 5 May 2023)	Succeeded by
Preceded by Francisco Chimoio (22 February 2003 - 5 May 2023)	Archbishop of Maputo (since 5 May 2023)	Succeeded by Incumbent
