= Júlio Duarte Langa =

Mozambican Catholic prelate (1927–2026)

His Eminence Julio Duarte Langa
- Cardinal, Bishop Emeritus of Xai-Xai
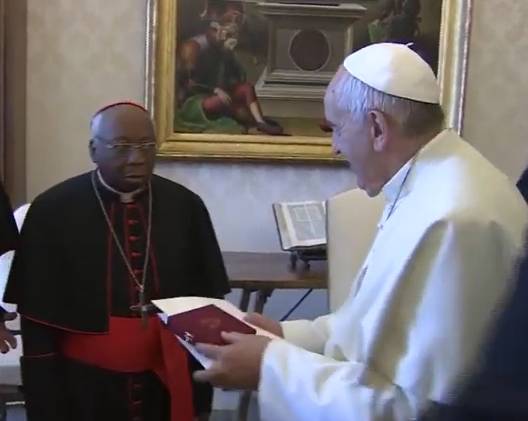
- Langa (left) with Pope Francis in 2015
- See: Xai-Xai
- Appointed: 31 May 1976
- Term ended: 12 July 2004
- Predecessor: Félix Niza Ribeiro
- Successor: Lucio Andrice Muandula
- Other post: Cardinal-Priest of San Gabriele dell'Addolorata

Orders
- Ordination: 9 June 1957
- Consecration: 24 October 1976 by Alexandre Jose Maria dos Santos, OFM Cap.
- Created cardinal: 14 February 2015 by Pope Francis

Personal details
- Born: Júlio Duarte Langa; 27 October 1927 Mangunze, Gaza Province, Portuguese Mozambique
- Died: 3 August 2026 (aged 98) Maputo, Mozambique
- Denomination: Roman Catholic
- Motto: In finem dilexit eos (In the end he loved them)
- Coat of arms: Julio Duarte Langa's coat of arms

Ordination history of Júlio Duarte Langa
History
Priestly ordination
- Date: 9 June 1957
Episcopal consecration
- Principal consecrator: Alexandre Jose Maria dos Santos, OFM Cap.
- Co-consecrators: Francesco Colasuonno; Januário Machaze Nhangumbe
- Date: 24 October 1976

Styles of Júlio Duarte Langa
- Reference style: His Eminence
- Spoken style: Your Eminence
- Religious style: Cardinal
- Informal style: Cardinal

Júlio Duarte Langa (27 October 1927 – 3 August 2026) was a Mozambican prelate of the Catholic Church. He was bishop of Xai-Xai from 24 October 1976 until 12 July 2004. Duarte Langa was made a cardinal in 2015.

== Education ==
Júlio Duarte Langa was born on 27 October 1927 in Mangunze, Chongoene District, in Gaza Province. He attended the local school before entering the Seminary of Magude. He then studied at the Seminary of Namaacha, in the Archdiocese of Lourenço Marques.

== Religious vocation ==
Duarte Langa was ordained a priest of the Archdiocese of Lourenço Marques on 9 June 1957.

On 31 May 1976, Pope Paul VI named him the second bishop of João Belo, which had been created in 1970. On 1 October 1976, the Diocese of João Belo was renamed the Diocese of Xai-Xai, so that when Duarte Langa was consecrated a bishop on 24 October 1976 by the archbishop of Lourenço Marques Alexandre José Maria dos Santos, he became Bishop of Xai-Xai.

Pope John Paul II accepted his resignation as bishop on 12 July 2004.

On 4 January 2015, Pope Francis announced that he would make him a cardinal on 14 February. At that ceremony, he was became Cardinal-Priest of the titular church of San Gabriele dell'Addolorata. He was one of five new cardinals too old to participate in a papal conclave whom Pope Francis said were "distinguished for their pastoral charity in service to the Holy See and the Church", chosen for their "pastoral solicitude". He was the second member of the College of Cardinals born in Mozambique, after Alexandre José Maria dos Santos.

== Death ==
Duarte Langa died at Maputo Central Hospital on 3 August 2026, at the age of 98.

== See also ==
- Catholic Church in Mozambique
- Cardinals created by Pope Francis

Catholic Church titles
Preceded by Félix Niza Ribeiro as Bishop of João Belo	Bishop of Xai-Xai; 1976–2004	Succeeded by Lucio Andrice Muandula
Preceded by Titular church established	Cardinal Priest of San Gabriele dell'Addolorata; 14 February 2015 – 3 August 2026	Succeeded by Vacant
