= Francisco Lerma Martínez =

Mozambican Roman Catholic bishop (1944–2019)

Francisco Lerma Martínez I.M.C.
- Bishop of Gurué
- Church: Catholic Church
- Diocese: Diocese of Gurué
- In office: 24 March 2010 – 24 April 2019
- Predecessor: Manuel Chuanguira Machado
- Successor: Inácio Lucas Mwita

Orders
- Ordination: 20 December 1969
- Consecration: 30 May 2010 by Lucio Andrice Muandula

Personal details
- Born: 4 May 1944 El Palmar, Province of Murcia, Spanish State
- Died: 24 April 2019 (aged 74) Maputo, Mozambique
- Coat of arms

Francisco Lerma Martínez (4 May 1944 – 24 April 2019) was a Mozambican Roman Catholic bishop.

Lerma Martínez was born in Spain and was ordained to the priesthood in 1969. He served as bishop of the Roman Catholic Diocese of Gurué, Mozambique from 2010 until his death in 2019.
