= Luiz Fernando Lisboa =

21st-century Brazilian Catholic bishop

His Excellency, The Most Reverend Luiz Fernando Lisboa C.P.
- Archbishop of Cachoeiro do Itapemirim
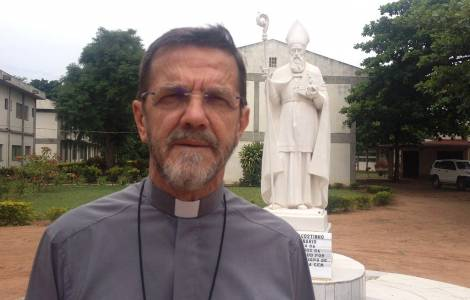
- Lisboa in 2020
- Church: Roman Catholic Church
- Diocese: Cachoeiro do Itapemirim
- Appointed: 11 February 2021
- Predecessor: Dario Campos
- Previous post: Bishop Pemba (2013–2021)

Orders
- Ordination: 10 December 1983
- Consecration: 24 August 2013 by Lucio Andrice Muandula

Personal details
- Born: 23 December 1955 (age 70) Valença, Brazil
- Motto: Evangelizare pauperibus misit

Luiz Fernando Lisboa C.P. (born 23 December 1955) is a Brazilian Catholic prelate who has served as Archbishop of Cachoeiro de Itapemirim since 2021. He was previously Bishop of Pemba in Mozambique from 2013 to 2021.

== Biography ==
Lisboa was born in Valença, in state of Rio de Janeiro, the ninth of the twelve children of Benedita de Oliveira Pereira and Francisco Lopes Pereira Lisboa. At the age of nine, he and his family moved to Osasco, São Paulo, where he spent most of his adolescence.

At 19, Lisboa entered the Seminary at St. Gabriel of the Congregation of the Passion on 4 August 1975. He began his novitiate training on 24 January 1976 in São Carlos, where he took his first vows of poverty, chastity, and obedience on 23 January 1977.

He completed his studies in Philosophy at the Pontifical Catholic University of Paraná in Curitiba from 1977 to 1980, and then in Theology at the Theological Institute of São Paulo - ITESP from 1980 to 1984. He specialized in Missiology and Liturgy at the Faculty of Theology Nossa Senhora da Assunção in São Paulo.

On 18 December 1982 Lisboa made his perpetual vows in the Congregation of the Passion. On 29 May 1983 he was ordained deacon at the Church of St. Anthony Mother, today known as the Osasco Cathedral. On 10 December 1983, Lisboa received priestly ordination from the hands of Francisco Manuel Vieira, then bishop auxiliary of São Paulo.

In 2001 he was sent as a missionary ad gentes to the Diocese of Pemba in Mozambique, where he carried out his ministry as Parish Vicar, Parish Priest and Formator at the local Passionist Seminary. Returning to Brazil in 2010, the following year he was appointed parish priest of Santa Teresinha de Lisieux in Colombo, in the Archdiocese of Curitiba.

On 12 June 2013 he was appointed bishop of Pemba. He received his episcopal ordination on 24 August 2013 in the Cathedral of Osasco from Bishop Lúcio Andrice Muandula, Bishop of Xai-Xai, assisted by Cardinal Raymundo Damasceno Assis, archbishop of Aparecida, and by Ercílio Turco, bishop of Osasco.

Starting in 2018 Lisboa was Secretary-General of the Episcopal Conference of Mozambique and Coordinator of the Social Department of the same Conference. He was involved in attempting to mitigate the Insurgency in Cabo Delgado, in which Islamist terrorist groups motivated by oil exploration in the region attack Christians. In 2020 he made an appeal to the European Union and especially to Portugal, to review the terms with which the most industrialized countries approach countries with a fragile but resource-rich economy.

On 11 February 2021, Lisboa was appointed bishop of Cachoeiro de Itapemirim, at the same time conferring him the title of Archbishop ad personam. At the same time Pope Francis also appointed António Juliasse Ferreira Sandramo, an auxiliary bishop of Maputo, as the apostolic administrator of Pemba. The Diocese of Cachoeiro do Itapemirim had been vacant since 7 November 2018, with the appointment of the then incumbent, Dario Campos OFM, for the Archdiocese of Vitória. Since then, the diocese has been under the pastoral care of Walter Luiz Barbiero Milaneze Altoé, his diocesan administrator.
