= Manuel Chuanguira Machado =

Mozambican Roman Catholic bishop (1950–2023)

His Excellency Edmund Michał Piszcz
- Bishop Emeritus of Gurúè
- Metropolis: Nampula
- Appointed: 6 December 1993
- Term ended: 9 October 2009
- Predecessor: First
- Successor: Francisco Lerma Martínez

Orders
- Ordination: 13 December 1981
- Consecration: 22 May 1994 by Jaime Pedro Gonçalves

Personal details
- Born: 11 June 1950 Banaze, Portuguese Mozambique
- Died: 11 October 2023 (aged 73) Quelimane, Mozambique

Manuel Chuanguira Machado (11 June 1950 – 11 October 2023) was a Mozambican Roman Catholic prelate. He was bishop of Gurué from 1994 to 2009.

Catholic Church titles
Preceded by First	Bishop of Gurúè; 1994–2009	Succeeded by Francisco Lerma Martínez
