= Januário Machaze Nhangumbe =

Mozambican Roman Catholic bishop (1934–2026)

The Most Reverend Januário Machaze Nhangumbe
- Bishop Emeritus of Pemba
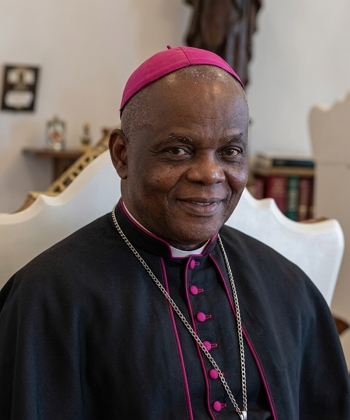
- Nhangumbe in 2015
- Church: Catholic Church
- Archdiocese: Nampula
- Diocese: Pemba
- Appointed: 15 January 1975
- Installed: 9 March 1975
- Term ended: 8 November 1993
- Predecessor: José dos Santos Garcia
- Successor: Tomé Makhweliha

Orders
- Ordination: 22 December 1962
- Consecration: 9 March 1975 by Agnelo Rossi, Laurean Rugambwa and Eduardo André Muaca

Personal details
- Born: 20 August 1934 Panda, Inhambane Province, Portuguese Mozambique
- Died: 23 August 2026 (aged 92) Maputo, Mozambique

Januário Machaze Nhangumbe (20 August 1934 – 23 August 2026) was a Mozambican Roman Catholic prelate who served as the second Bishop of Pemba from 1975 to 1993. He was appointed Bishop of Porto Amélia on 15 January 1975 and was consecrated on 9 March 1975. The diocese was renamed Pemba in September 1976.

Nhangumbe resigned from the pastoral governance of the diocese in November 1993 and subsequently became bishop emeritus.

== Early life and priesthood ==
Nhangumbe was born in Panda, in the Diocese of Inhambane, on 20 August 1934. He was ordained a priest on 22 December 1962.

During the period preceding Mozambican independence, Nhangumbe participated in efforts by Catholic clergy to establish contact with the leadership of the Mozambique Liberation Front (FRELIMO). Following the Portuguese Revolution of 25 April 1974, he travelled to Tanzania with the priest Alexandre José Maria dos Santos to discuss the future role of the Catholic Church in an independent Mozambique.

== Episcopate ==
On 15 January 1975, Pope Paul VI appointed Nhangumbe Bishop of Porto Amélia. He received his episcopal consecration on 9 March 1975 at the Sports Pavilion in Lourenço Marques (present-day Maputo). His principal consecrator was Cardinal Agnelo Rossi, then Prefect of the Congregation for the Evangelization of Peoples, with Cardinal Laurean Rugambwa and Eduardo André Muaca serving as co-consecrators. Nhangumbe was consecrated on the same occasion as Alexandre José Maria dos Santos, who later became Archbishop of Maputo and the first cardinal from Mozambique.

In September 1976, the Diocese of Porto Amélia was renamed the Diocese of Pemba.

Nhangumbe led the diocese through the early post-independence period, including a time marked by the departure of missionaries and the nationalisation of Church institutions. Vatican News later described his episcopal ministry as spanning a period of significant pastoral and social challenges in Mozambique.

His resignation from the pastoral governance of the Diocese of Pemba was accepted by Pope John Paul II on 8 November 1993, when he was 59 years old. He thereafter held the title of bishop emeritus.

== Later years and death ==
In March 2025, the Catholic Church in Mozambique marked the 50th anniversary of Nhangumbe's episcopal consecration with a thanksgiving Mass in Maputo. The celebration included messages from Pope Francis and the Dicastery for Evangelization, and a memoir of his life and ministry, Recordar é Viver ("Remembering is Living"), was launched.

Nhangumbe died at Maputo Central Hospital in Maputo, on 23 August 2026, at the age of 92. The announcement was made by the Archdiocese of Maputo in communion with the Diocese of Pemba.

The Diocese of Pemba's bishop, António Juliasse Ferreira Sandramo, described Nhangumbe as a firm pastor with clear ideas and recalled his 18 years of service to the diocese.

Catholic Church titles
Preceded by José dos Santos Garcia	Bishop of Pemba; 1975–1993	Succeeded by Tomé Makhweliha
