= Our Lady of Fatima Cathedral, Nampula =

Coordinates: 15.11297°S 39.25368°E

Our Lady of Fatima Cathedral
- Catedral Metropolitana de Nossa Senhora de Fátima
- Our Lady of Fatima Cathedral
- Location: Nampula
- Country: Mozambique
- Denomination: Roman Catholic Church

The Our Lady of Fatima Cathedral (Portuguese: Catedral Metropolitana de Nossa Senhora de Fátima) also called Metropolitan Cathedral of Our Lady of Fatima, is a religious building of the Catholic Church which is in Nampula, a town in the African country of Mozambique, which functions as the cathedral of the Archdiocese of Nampula.

The cathedral was inaugurated in 1956 by the then President of the Republic of Portugal, Francisco Craveiro Lopes when the territory was under Portuguese rule. It is a traditionalist design building, designed by Raul Lino and built between 1941, a year after the founding of the diocese, and 1955. It has two towers in the facade and an arched portico.

== See also ==
- Roman Catholicism in Mozambique
- Our Lady of Fatima Church
