= José dos Santos Garcia =

- Bishop of Port Amelia (Emeritus)
- Church: Roman Catholic Church
- See: Port Amelia
- In office: 1957–1975
- Predecessor: none
- Successor: Januário Machaze Nhangumbe
- Previous post: Priest

Orders
- Ordination: 25 June 1938
- Consecration: 16 June 1957 by Pope Pius XII

Personal details
- Born: 16 April 1913 Aldeia do Souto, Portugal
- Died: 11 December 2010 (aged 97) Cucujães, Portugal

José dos Santos Garcia S.M.P. (16 April 1913 – 11 December 2010) was a Portuguese bishop of the Roman Catholic Church. At the age of 97, he was one of the oldest Roman Catholic bishops and the oldest Portuguese bishop at the time of his death.

Garcia was born in Aldeia do Souto, Portugal in 1913. He was ordained a priest on 25 June 1938 for the Missionários da Boa Nova. He was appointed bishop to Port Amelia, Mozambique on 5 April 1957 and consecrated on 16 June 1957. He resigned from the position on 15 January 1975 just before Mozambique became independent from Portugal.
