= Custódio Alvim Pereira =

Portuguese-born archbishop

- Archbishop of Lourenço Marques
- Church: Catholic Church
- Archdiocese: Archdiocese of Lourenço Marques
- In office: 3 August 1962 – 26 August 1974
- Predecessor: Teodósio de Gouveia
- Successor: Alexandre José Maria dos Santos
- Previous posts: Titular Bishop of Nepte (1958-1962); Auxiliary Bishop of Lourenço Marques (1958-1962)

Orders
- Ordination: 18 December 1937
- Consecration: 8 March 1959 by Teodósio de Gouveia

Personal details
- Born: 6 February 1915 São João do Monte (northwest of Campo de Besteiros), Viseu District, Portugal
- Died: 12 November 2006 (aged 91) Rome, Italy

Custódio Alvim Pereira (6 February 1915 – 12 November 2006) was a Portuguese clergyman, who was Archbishop of Lourenço Marques in Mozambique in the 1960s and early 1970s. Born in São João do Monte, Portugal, he was ordained on 18 December 1937 and was appointed Auxiliary Bishop of Lourenço Marques on 20 December 1958. On 8 March 1959 he was ordained as the Titular Bishop of Nepte. On 3 August 1962 he was appointed Archbishop of Lourenço Marques, which he held until his resignation on 26 August 1974.
