= San Gabriele dell'Addolorata =

- Church of Gabriel of Our Lady of Sorrows
- S. Gabrielis a Virgine Perdolente
- Chiesa di San Gabriele dell'Addolorata
- Location within Rome
- 41°51′49″N 12°33′34″E
- Location: Via Ponzio Cominio 93/95, Don Bosco (Q. XXIV), Rome
- Country: Italy
- Language: Italian
- Denomination: Catholic
- Tradition: Roman Rite
- Website: sangabrieleroma.org

History
- Status: Titular church, parish church
- Founded: 2009
- Dedication: Gabriel of Our Lady of Sorrows
- Consecrated: 2009

Architecture
- Functional status: Active
- Architectural type: Modern
- Groundbreaking: 6 May 2007

Administration
- Diocese: Rome

San Gabriele dell'Addolorata is a 21st-century Catholic church located in eastern Rome. In 2015, Pope Francis created this church as the seat of cardinalatial title Sancti Gabrieli Aperdolentis. It is dedicated to Saint Gabriel of Our Lady of Sorrows (1838–1862).

== List of Cardinal priests ==
- Júlio Duarte Langa (2015–2026)
