= Amaro José de São Tomás =

Portuguese clergyman

Amaro José de São Tomás O.P.
- Prelate of Mozambico
- Church: Catholic Church
- In office: 18 July 1783 – 18 July 1801
- Predecessor: Position established
- Successor: Vasco José de Nossa Senhora da Boa Morte Lobo
- Other post: Titular Bishop of Pentacomia (1783-1801)

Orders
- Consecration: 28 October 1785 by Manuel de Santa Catarina

Personal details
- Born: 14 January 1747 Ponte da Barca, Kingdom of Portugal
- Died: 18 July 1801 (aged 54) Captaincy-General of Mozambique, Sofala and Rivers of Sena, Portuguese Empire

Amaro José de São Tomás O.P. (15 January 1747 – 18 July 1801) was a Portuguese clergyman, who was Prelate of Mozambico, Mozambique from 18 July 1783 and Titular Bishop of Pentacomia from 28 October 1785.
