= Inácio Saure =

Mozambican Roman Catholic archbishop

The Most Reverend Inácio Saure I.M.C.
- Archbishop of Nampula
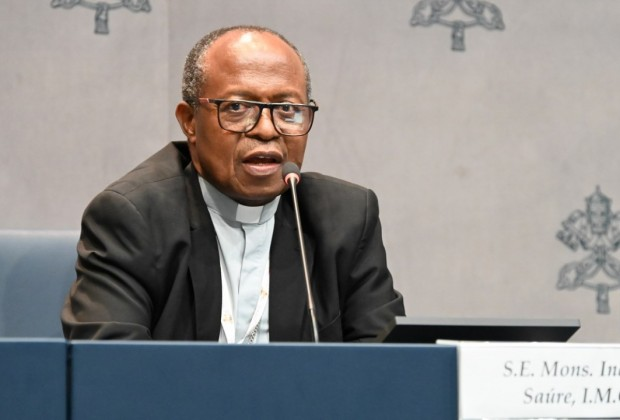
- Bishop Inácio Saure in 2014
- Church: Roman Catholic Church
- Archdiocese: Archdiocese of Nampula
- Appointed: 11 April 2017
- Installed: 11 June 2017
- Predecessor: Tomé Makhweliha
- Other post: Vice-President of the Mozambican Episcopal Conference (since 2018)
- Previous post: Bishop of Tete (2011-2017)

Orders
- Ordination: 8 December 1998
- Consecration: 22 May 2011 by Lucio Andrice Muandula

Personal details
- Born: Inácio Saure; 2 March 1960 (age 66) Balama, Portuguese Mozambique
- Motto: "Dives in misericordia" (Rich in Mercy)

Styles of Inácio Saure
- Reference style: His Grace; The Most Reverend
- Spoken style: Your Grace
- Religious style: Bishop

Inácio Saure, I.M.C. (born 2 March 1960) is a Mozambican prelate of the Catholic Church who has been Archbishop of Nampula since 2017. He was the Bishop of Tete from 2011 to 2017 and is a member of the Consolata Missionaries.

== Biography ==
Inácio Saure was born on 2 March 1960 in Balama, Mozambique. After the outbreak of civil war in Mozambique, he entered the Consolata Seminary in Maputo. He attended courses in philosophy and theology in the seminary of St. Augustine in Matola from 1990 to 1992, and continued his theological studies in the Democratic Republic of the Congo (DROC) at the Superior Institute of Theology of St. Eugene of Mazenod in Kinshasa, earning his bachelor's degree in sacred theology in 1998. He made his first vows as a member of the Consolata Mission Institute on 7 January 1995 and his perpetual vows on 15 May 1998. He was ordained a priest on 8 December 1998.

From 1999 to 2001 he was Parish Vicar of the Parish of S. Makusa Lukunga in Kinshasa; from 2002 to 2005 Pastor of the Mater Dei Parish and Superior of the Community in Mont Ngafula in the DROC; then Director of the Computer Science School and Regional Vice Superior; and in 2006 in Mozambique worked in the field of training; from 2006 to 2007 studied Italian in Rome and then followed a course for Novice Masters at the Mater Christi Institute in Bobo-Dioulasso in Burkina Faso. From 2008 to 2011 he was Rector of the Middle and Philosophical Seminary of the Consolata Missionaries in Matola and Novice Master at the Consolata International Novitiate in Maputo.

On 12 April 2011, Pope Benedict XVI appointed him Bishop of Tete. He received his episcopal consecration on 22 May from Lucio Andrice Muandula, Bishop of Xai-Xai, and was installed on 5 June.

On 11 April 2017, Pope Francis named him Archbishop of Nampula, and he was installed there on 11 June.

He was elected to a three-year term as president of the Episcopal Conference of Mozambique in November 2022.

The archbishop has been an outspoken critic of the Government's handling of protests and social unrest following the 2024 elections in Mozambique. He also criticised the handling of the insurgency in Cabo Delgado, and ineficiency in tackling poverty and inequality more generally.

In 2025 Archbishop Inácio Saure complained of illegal occupation of Church lands by squatters. In an article in Aid to the Church in Need, local Church sources imply that the squatters have the backing of the Government, and that the occupations are retaliation for the bishops' outspokenness.

In 2026 the bishop spoke about the rise of criminality in Mozambique, describing a recent attack on the house of a group of religious sisters in Nampula.

== See also ==
- Catholic Church in Mozambique
