= Amudarsa =

Amudarsa was a Roman-Berber city located on the plain of Saïda, in what was the province of Byzacena in modern Tunisia. The exact site of the town remains unknown.

The city was also the seat of an ancient Christian Bishopric. The diocese survives today as a titular bishopric of the Roman Catholic Church.

== See also ==
- Terence Brain
