= Luís Gonzaga Ferreira da Silva =

Luís Gonzaga Ferreira da Silva, S.J.
- Bishop of the Diocese of Lichinga (emeritus)
- Church: Roman Catholic Church
- See: Roman Catholic Diocese of Lichinga
- In office: 1972 - 2003
- Predecessor: Eurico Dias Nogueira
- Successor: Hilário da Cruz Massinga
- Previous post(s): Prelate

Orders
- Ordination: 11 July 1953

Personal details
- Born: 2 April 1923; Rebordões, Portugal
- Died: 7 August 2013 (aged 90); Angonia, Mozambique

Luís Gonzaga Ferreira da Silva, S.J. (2 April 1923 – 7 August 2013) was a Portuguese Prelate of the Catholic Church. Silva was born in Rebordões, Portugal and ordained a priest on 11 July 1953 from the religious order of the Society of Jesus. He was appointed bishop of the Diocese of Lichinga on 10 November 1972 and ordained on 17 December 1972. He retired from the Diocese of Lichinga on 25 January 2003. After his retirement he returned to the Angonia district on the other side of the Lake Malawi, where he came from Portugal as a missionary priest from the Society of Jesus in the 1950s. He served as assistant parish priest among the Christian communities there. He died on 7 August 2013, a week after a heart attack.
