= Manuel Vieira Pinto =

Roman Catholic Bishop (1923–2020)

Manuel da Silva Vieira Pinto
- Archbishop of Nampula
- Church: Roman Catholic Church
- See: Roman Catholic Archdiocese of Nampula
- In office: 1967–2000
- Predecessor: Manuel de Medeiros Guerreiro
- Successor: Tomé Makhweliha
- Previous post(s): Prelate

Orders
- Ordination: 7 August 1949

Personal details
- Born: 8 December 1923; São Pedro de Aboim, Amarante, Portugal
- Died: 30 April 2020 (aged 96); Porto, Portugal

Manuel da Silva Vieira Pinto (8 December 1923 – 30 April 2020) was a Portuguese-born prelate of the Catholic Church in Mozambique.

Pinto was born in São Pedro de Aboim, Amarante, Portugal, and was ordained a priest on 7 August 1949. He was appointed bishop (later archbishop) of the Archdiocese of Nampula on 21 April 1967 and consecrated on 29 June 1967, retiring on 16 November 2000. Pinto served as apostolic administrator to the Roman Catholic Archdiocese of Beira between 1971 and 1972 and the Diocese of Pemba from 1992 through 1998.

After the beginning of the activities of the FRELIMO liberation movement, in 1964, the times of terror of the Portuguese army started and Silva Vieira Pinto publicly protested against the government. His pious colleagues branded him as 'the Traitor of Nampula' and he was expelled from Mozambique. However, after a year he returned to a new Mozambique, now a socialist republic, and was welcomed with immense jubilation by his diocese.
