= Roman Catholic Diocese of Inhambane =

Roman Catholic diocese in Mozambique

Diocese of Inhambane Dioecesis Inhambanianus

catholic
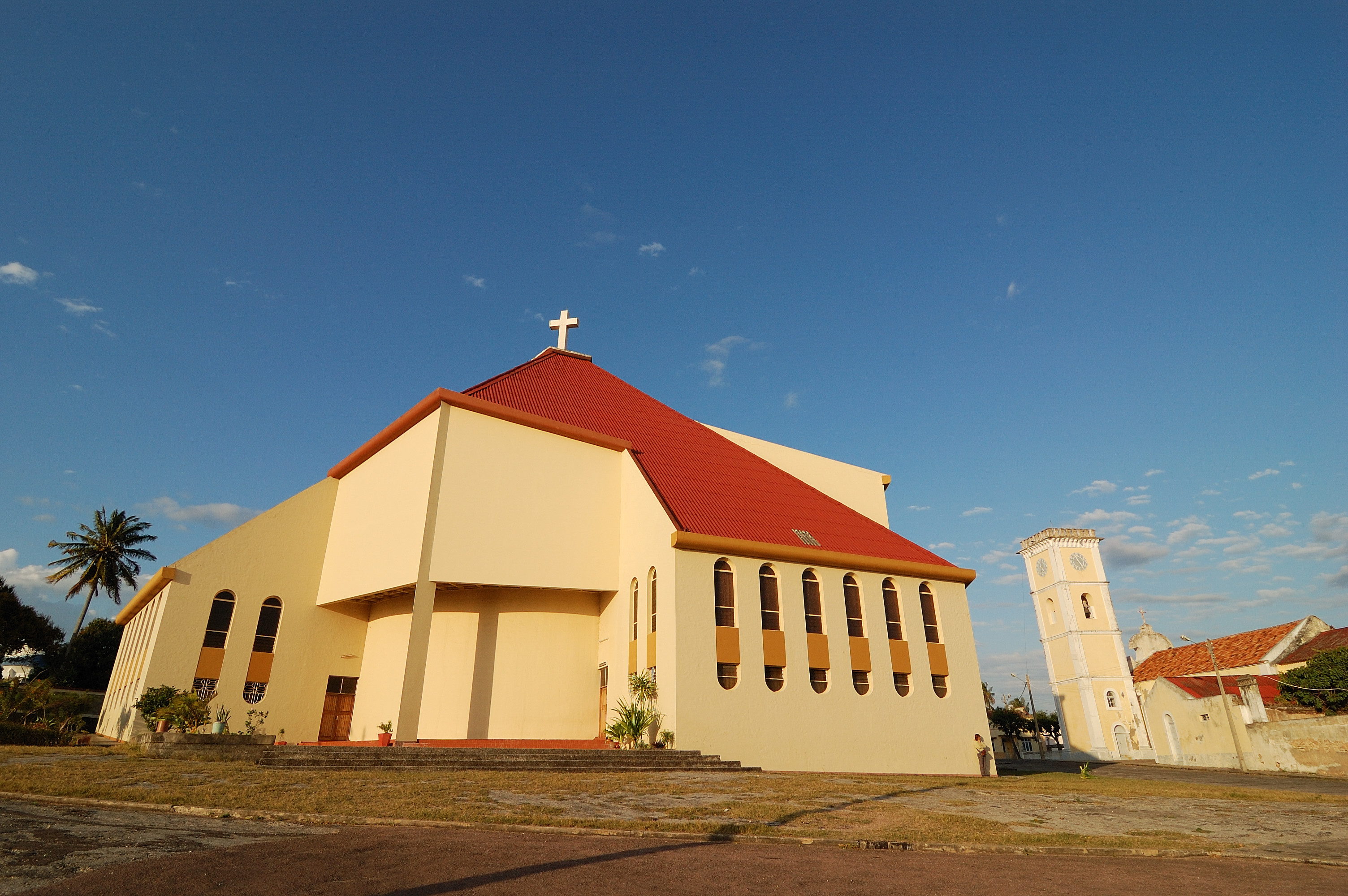
- Our Lady of the Immaculate Conception Cathedral, Inhambane

Location
- Country: Mozambique
- Metropolitan: Maputo
- Headquarters: Inhambane
- Coordinates: 23°51′47″S 35°22′46″E

Statistics
- Area: 68,476 km^{2} (26,439 sq mi)
- Population: Total; Catholics: (as of 2017); 1,762,604; 324,000 (18.1%)
- Parishes: 22

Information
- Rite: Latin Rite
- Established: August 3, 1962
- Cathedral: Our Lady of the Immaculate Conception Cathedral
- Patron saint: Nossa Senhora da Conceição
- Secular priests: 50

Current leadership
- Pope: Leo XIV
- Bishop: Ernesto Maguengue

The Roman Catholic Diocese of Inhambane (Latin: Inhambanian(us)) is a diocese located in the city of Inhambane in the ecclesiastical province of Maputo in Mozambique.

== History ==
- August 3, 1962: Established as Diocese of Inhambane from Metropolitan Archdiocese of Lourenço Marques

== Special churches ==
The Cathedral is Catedral da Nossa Senhora da Conceição (Cathedral of Our Lady of the Immaculate Conception) in Inhambane.

== Bishops ==
- Bishops of Inhambane (Roman rite)
  - Bishop Ernesto Gonçalves Costa, O.F.M. (27 October 1962 – 23 December 1974)
  - Bishop Alberto Setele (20 November 1975 – 7 September 2006)
  - Bishop Adriano Langa, O.F.M. (7 September 2006 – 4 April 2022)
  - Bishop Ernesto Maguengue (since 4 April 2022)

=== Coadjutor Bishop ===
- Adriano Langa, O.F.M. (2005-2006)

=== Auxiliary Bishop ===
- Hilário da Cruz Massinga, OFM (since 11 August 2023)

== See also ==
- Roman Catholicism in Mozambique

== Sources ==
- GCatholic.org
- Catholic Hierarchy
