= San Frumenzio ai Prati Fiscali =

Church of Saint Frumentius ai Prati Fiscali
- San Frumenzio ai Prati Fiscali (in Italian); S. Frumentii ad Prata Fiscalia (in Latin)
- Click on the map for a fullscreen view
- 41°56′48.28″N 12°31′03.20″E
- Location: Via Cavriglia 8, Rome
- Country: Italy
- Denomination: Roman Catholic
- Tradition: Roman Rite
- Website: Official website

History
- Status: Titular church
- Dedication: Frumentius
- Consecrated: 1994

Architecture
- Architect: Eugene Abruzzini
- Architectural type: Church

The Church of Saint Frumentius at the Prati Fiscali (Italian: San Frumenzio ai Prati Fiscali, Latin: S. Frumentii ad Prata Fiscalia) is a Roman Catholic titular church in Rome, built as a parish church. On 28 June 1988 Pope John Paul II granted it a titular church as a seat for Cardinals.

The Cardinal Priest of the Titulus Sancti Frumentii ad Prata Fiscalia from 1988 until his death in 2021 was Alexandre José Maria dos Santos.

The church is named for Frumentius, a 4th-century Phoenician missionary who is credited with introducing Christianity to the Kingdom of Aksum (Ethiopia). "Prati Fiscali" is the name of the area, deriving from an estate located north of the Aniene; the name literally means "Meadows of Tax", but this would appear to be a corruption of Filiscari or Flescari, a word of unclear meaning that appears in 10th-century documents.

== Architecture ==
The church is semi-circular in shape. The apse is decorated with a series of seven icons, done by Luciana Siotto, which form Deesis at with the centre is the icon of Christ on the throne, to his right are icons depicting the Virgin Mary, the Archangel Michael and St. Peter. To the left are the icons depicting St. John the Baptist, the Archangel Gabriel and St. Paul.

== List of Cardinal Priests ==
- Alexandre José Maria dos Santos (28 June 1988 – 29 September 2021)
- Robert Walter McElroy (27 August 2022 -)
