= Teodósio de Gouveia =

Portuguese Cardinal

His Eminence Theodósio de Gouveia GCC GCIH
- Archbishop of Lourenço Marques
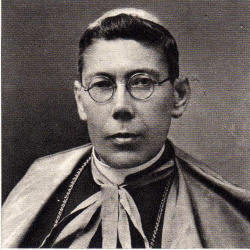
- Church: Roman Catholic Church
- Archdiocese: Lourenço Marques
- See: Lourenço Marques
- Appointed: 18 January 1941
- Term ended: 6 February 1962
- Predecessor: Joaquim Rafael Maria d'Assunçâo Pitinho
- Successor: Custódio Alvim Pereira
- Other post: Cardinal-Priest of San Pietro in Vincoli (1946-62)
- Previous posts: Titular Bishop of Leuce (1936-40); Prelate of Mozambique (1936-40)

Orders
- Ordination: 19 April 1919 by Basilio Pompili
- Consecration: 5 July 1936 by Raffaele Carlo Rossi
- Created cardinal: 18 February 1946 by Pope Pius XII
- Rank: Cardinal-Priest

Personal details
- Born: Teodósio Clemente de Gouveia; 13 May 1889 São Jorge, Portugal
- Died: 6 February 1962 (aged 72) Maputo, Mozambique
- Education: Institut Catholique de Paris; Pontifical Gregorian University
- Motto: Factus Omnia omnibus

Styles of Theodósio de Gouveia
- Reference style: His Eminence
- Spoken style: Your Eminence
- Informal style: Cardinal
- See: Lourenço Marques

Theodósio Clemente de Gouveia GCC GCIH (13 May 1889 – 6 February 1962) was a Portuguese Cardinal of the Roman Catholic Church, who served as Archbishop of Lourenço Marques in Mozambique from 1940 until his death, and was elevated to the cardinalate in 1946 by Pope Pius XII.

== Early life ==
Theodósio Clemente de Gouveia was born in São Jorge, Madeira, to farmers Clemente Francisco de Gouveia and Ana Augusta Jardim. Baptized on 25 May 1889 by Vicar José Calisto de Andrade, and having as godparents Theodósio Francisco de Gouveia and Maria Rosa Jardim.

Being 16 years old, he entered Our Lady of the Incarnation Seminary, run by the Claretians, in Funchal on 4 October 1905. The seminary was confiscated in 1910 by revolutionaries, and Gouveia and his fellow students were taken to the Claretian house of studies in Paris in 1912. Due to the German invasion, they were again moved in 1914, this time to the Lazarist seminary in Dax. Gouveia, during his time in Paris, also attended the Seminary of Saint-Sulpice and Catholic Institute of Paris.

== Ecclesiastic career ==
Gouveia, who had joined the Lazarists in 1911, left the religious institute in 1915. He then went to Rome in January 1916 to study at the Pontifical Gregorian University (from where he obtained doctorates in theology and in canon law), whilst residing at the Colégio Português. After receiving the subdiaconate and diaconate in 1918, Gouveia was eventually ordained to the priesthood by Cardinal Basilio Pompili on 19 April 1919. He attended the School of Social Studies in Bergamo from 1920 to 1921, when he entered the University of Louvain.

Returning to Madeira in 1922, he was named secretary of the ecclesiastical chamber of the Diocese of Funchal and a professor at its seminary. Gouveia was Vice-Rector (1929–1934) and later Rector (1934–1936) of the Pontifical Portuguese College in Rome. During this time, he also served as rector of the church of Sant'Antonio dei Portoghesi. He was raised to the rank of Privy Chamberlain of His Holiness on 26 November 1931, and Domestic Prelate of His Holiness on 23 April 1934.

On 18 May 1936, Gouveia was appointed Territorial Prelate of Mozambique and Titular Bishop of Leuce. He received his episcopal consecration on the following 5 July from Cardinal Raffaele Rossi, with Archbishops Ernesto Senna de Oliveira and Ildebrando Antoniutti serving as co-consecrators, in S. Antonio dei Portoghesi. Gouveira was later named the first Archbishop of Lourenço Marques on 4 September 1940, being installed on 18 January 1941. During his tenure he was gained notoriety for being a champion of Catholic education.

Pope Pius XII created him Cardinal Priest of San Pietro in Vincoli in the consistory of 18 February 1946. Gouveia, the first resident cardinal of Africa in modern times, was elevated to the College of Cardinals in order to emphasize the "colonial peoples' right to effective representation in world affairs". He was one of the cardinal electors who participated in the 1958 papal conclave that selected Pope John XXIII.

He died from leukemia at 3:45 p.m. in his archiepiscopal residence in Lourenço Marques, at age 72. After lying in state in his residence until the next day, the Cardinal was buried behind the main altar of the metropolitan cathedral following a funeral Mass there on 8 February 1962 in a simple tomb marked only with his coat of arms, according to his will.

== Honours ==
- Grand Cross of the Order of Prince Henry (8 December 1939)
- Grand Cross of the Order of Prince Henry (11 September 1961)
