= Diocese of Lichinga =

Roman Catholic diocese in Mozambique

Coordinates: 13°19′S 35°14′E

Diocese of Lichinga Dioecesis Lichingaensis

Location
- Country: Mozambique
- Metropolitan: Nampula

Statistics
- Area: 129,362 km^{2} (49,947 sq mi)
- Population: Total; Catholics: (as of 2004); 839,569; 194,485 (23.2%)

Information
- Rite: Latin Rite
- Cathedral: St. Joseph Cathedral

Current leadership
- Pope: Leo XIV
- Bishop: Atanasio Amisse Canira
- Bishops emeritus: Hilário da Cruz Massinga, O.F.M.

The Roman Catholic Diocese of Lichinga (Latin: Lichingaën(sis)) is a diocese located in the city of Lichinga in the ecclesiastical province of Nampula in Mozambique.

== History ==
- 21 July 1963: Established as Diocese of Vila Cabral from the Diocese of Nampula
- 29 July 1976: Renamed as Diocese of Lichinga

== Leadership ==
- Bishops of Vila Cabral (Roman rite)
  - Bishop Eurico Dias Nogueira (10 July 1964 – 19 February 1972), appointed Bishop of Sá da Bandeira, Angola; future Archbishop
  - Bishop Luís Gonzaga Ferreira da Silva, S.J. (10 November 1972 – 29 July 1976)
- Bishops of Lichinga (Roman rite)
  - Bishop Luís Gonzaga Ferreira da Silva, S.J. (29 July 1976 – 25 January 2003)
  - Bishop Hilário da Cruz Massinga, O.F.M. (5 April 2003 – 25 January 2008), appointed Bishop of Quelimane
  - Bishop Elio Giovanni Greselin, S.C.I. (30 December 2008 – 8 February 2015)
  - Bishop Atanasio Amisse Canira (since 8 February 2015)

== See also ==
- Roman Catholicism in Mozambique

== Sources ==
- GCatholic.org
- Catholic Hierarchy
