= Diocese of Chimoio =

Roman Catholic diocese in Mozambique

Coordinates: 19°07′S 33°27′E

Diocese of Chimoio Dioecesis Cimoianus

Location
- Country: Mozambique
- Metropolitan: Beira

Statistics
- Area: 61,661 km^{2} (23,807 sq mi)
- Population: Total; Catholics: (as of 2013); 1,301,000; 90,462 (7.0%)

Information
- Rite: Latin Rite
- Cathedral: Cathedral of Mary Immaculate

Current leadership
- Pope: Leo XIV
- Bishop: Lucio Andrice Muandula
- Bishops emeritus: Francisco João Silota, M. Afr.

The Roman Catholic Diocese of Chimoio (Latin: Cimoian(us) is a diocese located in the city of Chimoio in the ecclesiastical province of Beira in Mozambique.

== History ==
- November 19, 1990: Established as Diocese of Chimoio from the Metropolitan Archdiocese of Beira

== Bishops ==
- Bishops of Chimoio (Roman rite)
  - Francisco João Silota, M. Afr. (19 November 1990 – 2 January 2017)
  - João Carlos Hatoa Nunes (2 January 2017 – 15 November 2022), appointed Coadjutor Archbishop of Maputo
  - Lucio Andrice Muandula (17 December 2025 – present)

=== Other priest of this diocese who became bishop ===
- António Juliasse Ferreira Sandramo, appointed auxiliary bishop of Maputo in 2018

== See also ==
- Roman Catholicism in Mozambique

== Sources ==
- GCatholic.org
- Catholic Hierarchy
