= Diocese of Pemba =

Roman Catholic diocese in Mozambique

Coordinates: 12°58′S 40°33′E

Diocese of Pemba Dioecesis Pembana

Location
- Country: Mozambique
- Metropolitan: Nampula

Statistics
- Area: 82,625 km^{2} (31,902 sq mi)
- Population: Total; Catholics: (as of 2004); 1,400,000; 400,000 (28.6%)

Information
- Rite: Roman Rite
- Cathedral: Cathedral of St. Paul

Current leadership
- Pope: Pope Leo XIV
- Bishop: António Juliasse Ferreira Sandramo

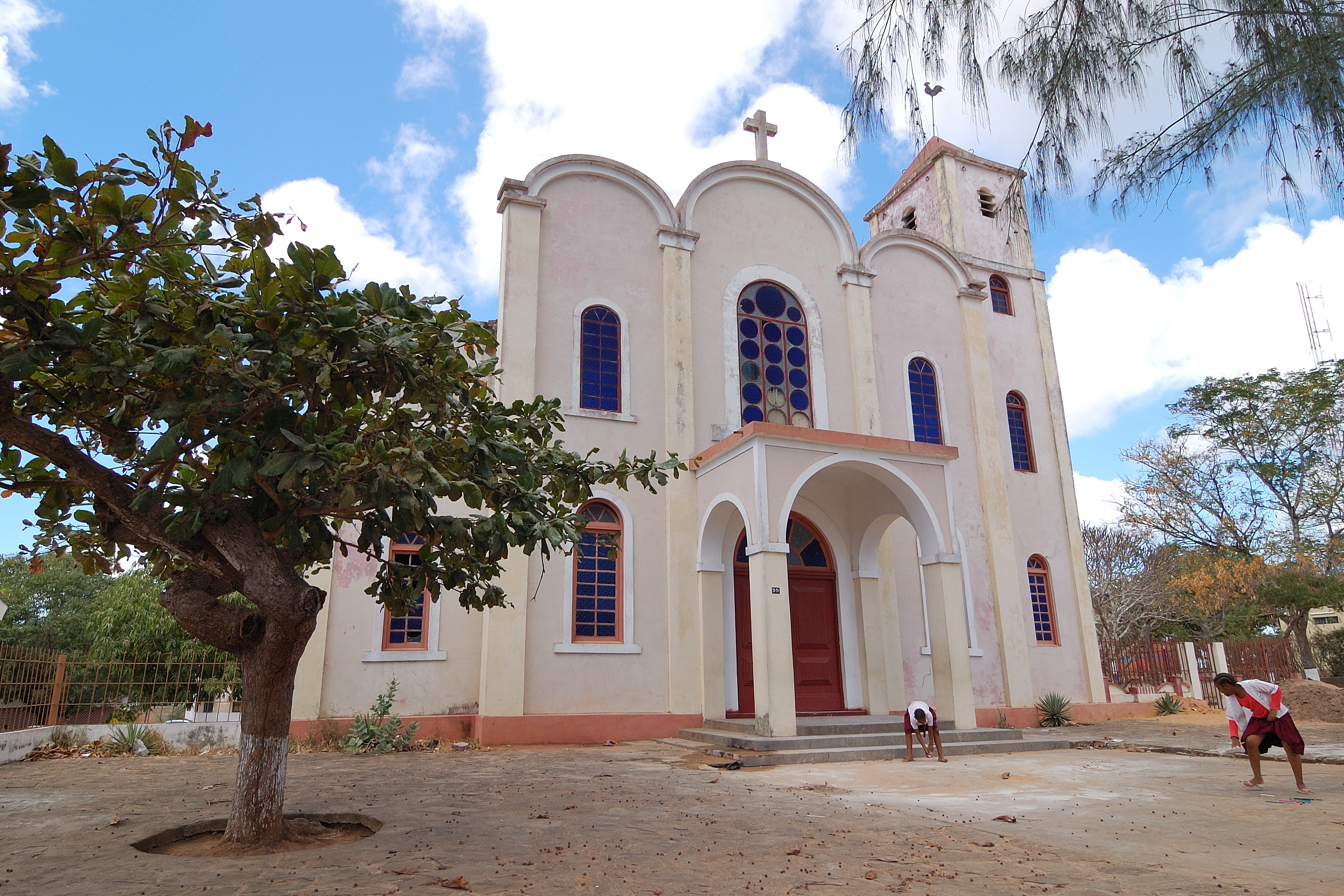
Paul's Cathedral in Pemba, Mozambique

The Roman Catholic Diocese of Pemba (Latin: Pemban(a)) is a diocese located in the city of Pemba in the ecclesiastical province of Nampula in Mozambique.

== History ==
- April 5, 1957: Established as Diocese of Porto Amélia from the Diocese of Nampula
- September 17, 1976: Renamed as Diocese of Pemba

== Leadership ==
- Bishops of Porto Amélia (Latin Church)
  - Bishop José dos Santos Garcia, S.M.P. (5 April 1957 – 15 January 1975)
  - Bishop Januário Machaze Nhangumbe (15 January 1975 – 17 September 1976 see below)
- Bishops of Pemba (Latin Church)
  - Bishop Januário Machaze Nhangumbe (see above 17 September 1976 – 8 November 1993)
  - Bishop Tomé Makhweliha, S.C.I. (24 October 1997 – 16 November 2000), appointed Archbishop of Nampula
  - Bishop Francisco Chimoio, O.F.M. Cap. (5 December 2000 – 22 March 2003), appointed Archbishop of Maputo
  - Bishop Ernesto Maguengue (24 June 2004 – 27 October 2012), resigned; later appointed auxiliary bishop of Nampula
  - Bishop Luiz Fernando Lisboa (12 March 2013 – 11 February 2021), appointed Archbishop (Personal Title) of Cachoeiro do Itapemirim
  - Bishop António Juliasse Ferreira Sandramo (since 8 March 2022)

== Persecution and insecurity ==
In October 2017 suspected Islamic militants began a terror campaign insurgency in Cabo Delgado, Diocese of Pemba. The Jihadists were later confirmed to be linked to Ansar al-Sunna, which is under the umbrella of the Islamic State. The bishop at the time was Luiz Fernando Lisboa, who spoke out often about the violence, denouncing both the terrorists and the regime's response. The bishop met personally with Pope Francis to discuss the issue and in an interview with Portuguese media outlet Renascença he later confirmed that he had left Mozambique abruptly, being transferred to his native Brazil, because he had received credible death threats from the Government.

The new bishop, António Juliasse Ferreira Sandramo, has also spoken about the violence, and has said that the Church wants to be part of the solution, but has not been approached by the Government to help in any way until now. "The whole of society has to be involved, and that includes the Church, which can contribute to the promotion of peace and stability for the country. We do what we can to spread love and peace to everyone, and we have been having meetings with other religious leaders, Christians and Muslims. We have not yet been officially approached for cooperation, but we have much to contribute, the Church has experience in this field that could be very useful". He also criticised the Government for relying only on military force to quell the insurgency. "As we bishops, and other members of civil society, have been saying, the military solution is not the only one, because most of these young terrorists are local boys. Some might come from abroad, but most of them are Mozambican, they come from the villages, they know the terrain. This makes it easy for them to hide, they watch the armed forces and only attack when they are far away".

In an interview with Aid to the Church in Need, in June 2022, Bishop António Juliasse spoke about the gravity of the situation and how it was affecting pastoral work. "We have parishes that have been practically destroyed, priests who are living in difficult situations because they had to abandon their missions empty-handed; children, elderly people and others are in great need, and we can’t handle it by ourselves."

The bishop has visited some of the more badly affected areas of the diocese, including Mocímboa da Praia, where the insurgency began in 2017. With the local church in ruins, he celebrated outdoors, according to ACN in 2024. "In July of last year, I visited a community in Palma District. We celebrated Mass beneath the mango trees, in the rain and cold, but the people remained for two hours, singing and dancing. I was deeply moved with the hope in the faces of the people."

Following another pastoral visit in August 2024, the bishop said: "Everywhere I went we celebrated Mass this way, in the open, among the ruins of the churches which had been destroyed and vandalized, like in Nangololo. It is very painful to see the ruins of buildings which, for so long, were an expression of people’s faith. Now, not much is left besides the wreckage."

In 2026 insurgents burned down the historic São Luis Maria de Monfort Church in Meza. Bishop António Juliasse described the incident as a "scene of terror. Homes, infrastructure, all destroyed, and the historic parish reduced to rubble. Civilians were captured and forced to watch and listen to speeches of hatred".

So far the violence has caused around 5000 deaths and over 800 thousand internally displaced people, the majority of which in the Diocese of Pemba, and the Church has been heavily involved in providing humanitarian relief. Bishop António Juliasse said in June 2026 that the insurgents are clearly attempting to establish a caliphate in the region.

== See also ==
- Roman Catholicism in Mozambique

== Sources ==
- GCatholic.org
- Catholic Hierarchy
