= Diocese of Gurúè =

Roman Catholic diocese in Mozambique

Coordinates: 15°28′S 36°59′E

Diocese of Gurúè Dioecesis Guruensis
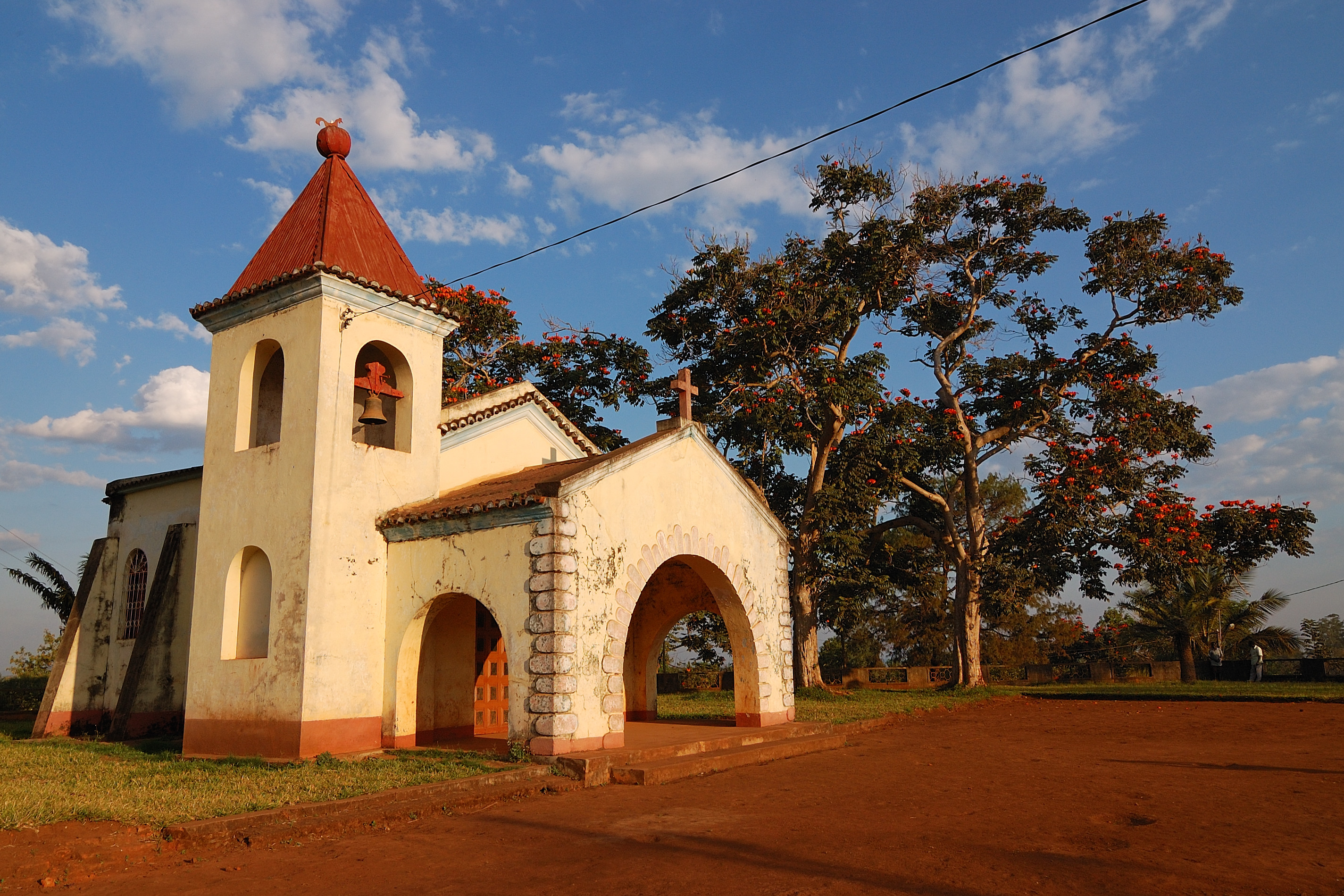

Location
- Country: Mozambique
- Metropolitan: Nampula

Statistics
- Area: 42,451 km^{2} (16,390 sq mi)
- Population: Total; Catholics: (as of 2004); 1,428,000; 239,000 (16.7%)

Information
- Denomination: Latin Church
- Rite: Roman Rite
- Cathedral: Cathedral of St. Anthony of Lisbon

Current leadership
- Pope: Leo XIV
- Bishop: Inácio Lucas Mwita

The Roman Catholic Diocese of Gurúè (Latin: Guruen(sis)) is a diocese located in the city of Gurué in the ecclesiastical province of Nampula in Mozambique.

== History ==
- 6 December 1993 – Established as the Diocese of Gurué from the Diocese of Quelimane
- 23 January 2025 – Lost territory due to the erection of the Diocese of Alto Molócuè

== Leadership ==
- Bishops of Gurúè (Latin Church)
  - Manuel Chuanguira Machado (December 6, 1993 – October 9, 2009)
  - Francisco Lerma Martínez (March 24, 2010 – April 24, 2019)
  - Inácio Lucas Mwita (since 2 February 2021)

== See also ==
- Roman Catholicism in Mozambique

== Sources ==
- GCatholic.org
- Catholic Hierarchy
