= Diocese of Xai-Xai =

Roman Catholic diocese in Mozambique

Coordinates: 25°03′S 33°39′E

Diocese of Xai-Xai Dioecesis Xai-Xaiensis

Location
- Country: Mozambique
- Metropolitan: Maputo

Statistics
- Area: 75,709 km^{2} (29,231 sq mi)
- Population: Total; Catholics: (as of 2004); 1,289,000; 174,229 (13.5%)

Information
- Denomination: Catholic Church
- Rite: Latin Rite
- Cathedral: Catedral São João Baptista

Current leadership
- Pope: Leo XIV
- Apostolic Administrator: Francisco Chimoio, OFM Cap, Archbishop Emeritus of Maputo

The Roman Catholic Diocese of Xai-Xai (Latin: Xai-Xaien(sis)) is a diocese located in the city of Xai-Xai in the Ecclesiastical Province of Maputo in Mozambique.

== History ==
- 19 June 1970: Established as Diocese of João Belo from the Metropolitan Archdiocese of Lourenço Marques
- 1 October 1976: Renamed as Diocese of Xai-Xai

== Special churches ==
The cathedral is the Catedral São João Baptista (Cathedral of St. John the Baptist) in Xai-Xai.

== Leadership ==
=== Bishops of João Belo ===
- Félix Niza Ribeiro (1972-1976)

=== Bishops of Xai-Xai ===
- Júlio Duarte Langa (1976 – 2004) (made a cardinal in 2015)
- Lucio Andrice Muandula (2004 – 2025), appointed Bishop of Chimoio
  - Apostolic Administrator: Francisco Chimoio, OFM Cap (since 2026)

=== Auxiliary Bishops ===
- Alberto Vera Aréjula, O. de M. (2015 – 2018), appointed Bishop of Nacala

== See also ==
- Roman Catholicism in Mozambique
