= Diocese of Nacala =

Roman Catholic diocese in Mozambique

Coordinates: 14°32′34″S 40°40′22″E

Diocese of Nacala Dioecesis Nacalana

Location
- Country: Mozambique
- Metropolitan: Nampula

Statistics
- Area: 26,000 km^{2} (10,000 sq mi)
- Population: Total; Catholics: (as of 2004); 2,100,000; 276,000 (13.1%)

Information
- Rite: Latin Rite
- Cathedral: Our Lady of Good Voyage

Current leadership
- Pope: Leo XIV
- Bishop: Alberto Vera Aréjula, O. de M.
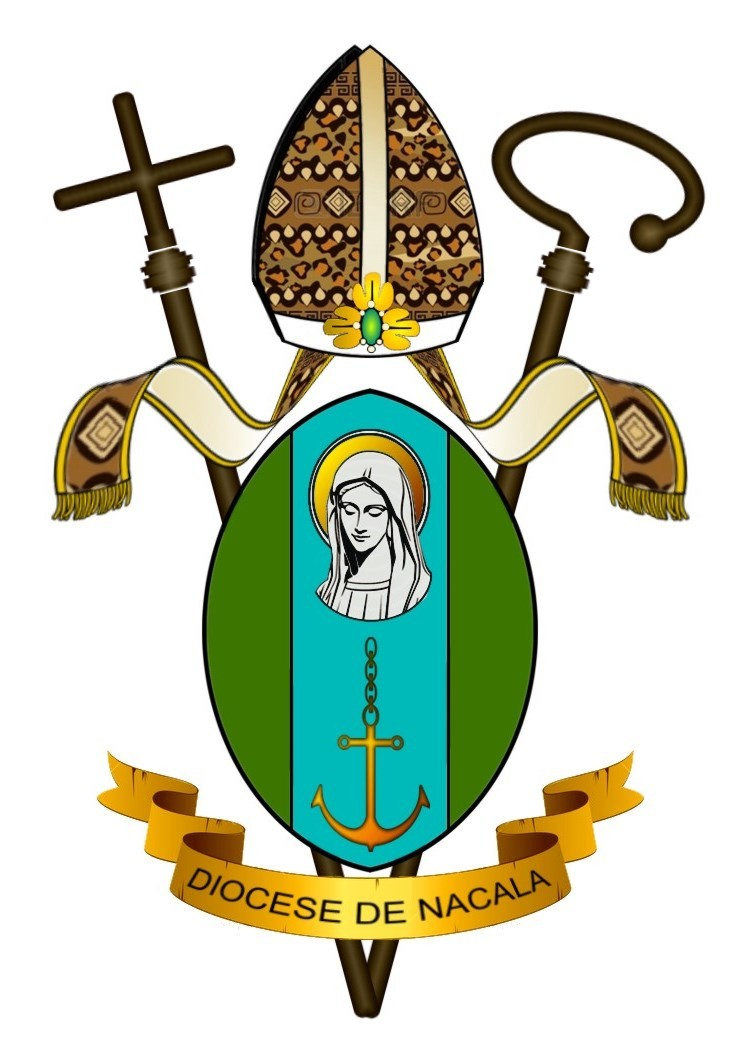
- Bishops emeritus: Germano Grachane, C.M. Coat of arms of the Diocese of Nacala

The Roman Catholic Diocese of Nacala (Latin: Nacalan(a)) is a diocese located in the city of Nacala in the ecclesiastical province of Nampula in Mozambique.

== History ==
- October 11, 1991: Established as Diocese of Nacala from the Metropolitan Archdiocese of Nampula

== Leadership ==
- Bishops of Nacala (Roman rite)
  - Bishop Germano Grachane, C.M. (October 11, 1991 - April 25, 2018)
  - Bishop Alberto Vera Aréjula, O. de M. (since 25 April 2018)

== Persecution and insecurity ==
In September 2022 the Diocese of Nacala began to be affected by the Islamist insurgency that had begun in 2017 in Cabo Delgado, proving that the terrorists, affiliated with Ansar al-Sunna, were spreading South. An attack on a Catholic Mission in Chipene left the entire premises destroyed, and the insurgents murdered a Catholic nun, Sister Maria de Coppi. Later, the same insurgents killed at least three Christians in surrounding settlements, slitting their throats, according to Bishop Alberto Vera Aréjula. This marked a difference in strategy by the terrorists, who until now had mostly refrained from specifically targeting Christians and Christian symbols and buildings.

== See also ==
- Roman Catholicism in Mozambique

== Sources ==
- GCatholic.org
- Catholic Hierarchy
