= Francisco Chimoio =

Mozambican Catholic prelate (born 1947)

The Most Reverend Francisco Chimoio OFMCap
- Archbishop Emeritus of Maputo, Mozambique
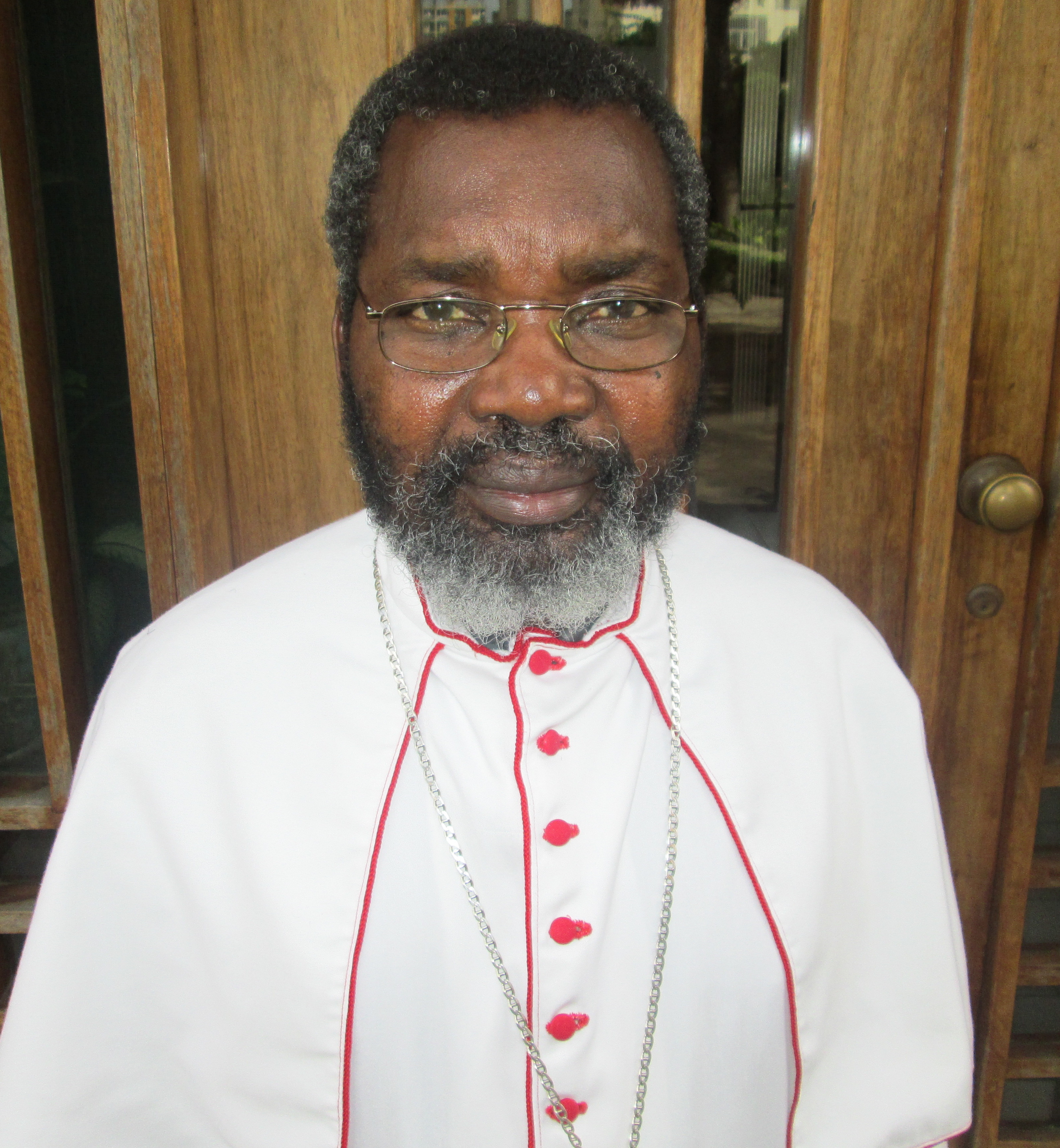
- Archbishop Emeritus Francisco Chimoio
- Church: Roman Catholic Church
- Archdiocese: Archdiocese of Maputo
- See: Maputo
- Appointed: 22 February 2003
- Installed: 22 February 2003
- Term ended: 5 May 2023
- Predecessor: Alexandre José Maria dos Santos
- Successor: João Carlos Hatoa Nunes
- Previous post: Bishop of Pemba (5 December 2000 - 22 February 2003)

Orders
- Ordination: 9 December 1979 by Jaime Pedro Gonçalves
- Consecration: 25 February 2001 by Jaime Pedro Gonçalves

Personal details
- Born: Francisco Chimoio; 6 December 1947 (age 78) Búzi-Sofala, Mozambique

Styles of Francisco Chimoio
- Reference style: Your Lordship; The Most Reverend
- Spoken style: His Lordship
- Religious style: Archbishop

Francisco Chimoio, OFMCap (born 6 December 1947), is a Mozambican Roman Catholic prelate who was the Archbishop of Roman Catholic Archdiocese of Maputo, Mozambique, from 22 February 2003 until his age-related retirement on 5 May 2023. Before that, from 5 December 2000 until 22 February 2003, he was Bishop of the Diocese of Pemba. He was appointed bishop by Pope John Paul II. He was consecrated bishop at Quelimane on 25 February 2001. Pope Francis accepted Chimoio's age-related retirement request on 5 May 2023. The Archbishop Emeritus of Maputo, Mozambique is a member of the Catholic Order of Friars Minor Capuchin (OFMCap).

== Early life and education ==
He was born on 6 December 1947 in Búzi-Sofala, Sofala Province, Archdiocese of Beira, Mozambique. He joined the Capuchin order in 1967 and made perpetual vows on 26 February 1978. He studied philosophy and theology while in seminary, before he was ordained a priest. He holds a Licentiate in missiology, awarded in 1987, by the Pontifical University of Saint Anthony in Rome, Italy.

== Priest ==
He became a member of the Catholic Order of Friars Minor Capuchin, white in seminary. He was ordained a priest of that religious Order on 9 December 1979 at Macúti by Jaime Pedro Gonçalves, Archbishop of Beira. Chimoio initially worked as Superior of the Capuchin Custody in Quelimane. In 1984 he was sent to Rome for further studies. When he returned to Mozambique, he was appointed master of novices in his convent in Quelimane. From 1993 to 1999, Chimoio served as vice provincial of the Capuchin Province of Mozambique. He then worked again as master of novices.

== Bishop ==
Pope John Paul II appointed him to the position of Bishop of the Roman Catholic Diocese of Pemba on 5 December 2000. He succeeded Tomé Makhweliha, who had been transferred to Nampula as archbishop there, three weeks before. The bishop's consecration took place on 25 February 2001. The Principal Consecrator was Jaime Pedro Gonçalves, Archbishop of Beira assisted by Tomé Makhweliha, Archbishop of Nampula and Bernardo Filipe Governo, Bishop of Quelimane.

== Archbishop ==
On 22 February 2003, The Holy Father elevated him to the position of Archbishop of Maputo. In 2007, he was quoted as having said that some condoms and anti-retroviral medication made in Europe have been deliberately infected with HIV "in order to finish quickly the African people". He later explained that he had been misinterpreted.

He assumed office during a period when Mozambique was recovering from a quarter-a-century of civil war. To complicate the social situation, Southern Africa, the region where the country is located was undergoing a severe drought. He advocated civility towards one another, condemned hate speech and together with Auxiliary Bishop António Juliasse Ferreira Sandramo, promoted unity among the people.

On 5 May 2023, Pope Francis accepted Archbishop Chimoio's age related resignation from the pastoral care of the Archdiocese of Maputo. The Holy Father appointed Archbishop João Carlos Hatoa Nunes, previously Coadjutor Bishop, as the successor at Maputo.

== See also ==
- Catholic Church in Mozambique

== Succession table ==
Catholic Church titles
Preceded by Alexandre José Maria dos Santos (23 December 1974 - 22 February 2003)	Archbishop of Maputo (22 February 2003 - 5 May 2023)	Succeeded by João Carlos Hatoa Nunes (since 5 May 2023)
Preceded by Tomé Makhweliha (24 October 1997 - 16 November 2000)	Bishop of Pemba (5 December 2000 - 22 February 2003	Succeeded by Ernesto Maguengue (24 June 2004 - 27 October 2012)
