= Roman Catholic Archdiocese of Maputo =

Roman Catholic archdiocese in Mozambique

Coordinates: 25.9691°S 32.5742°E

Archdiocese of Maputo Archidioecesis Maputensis
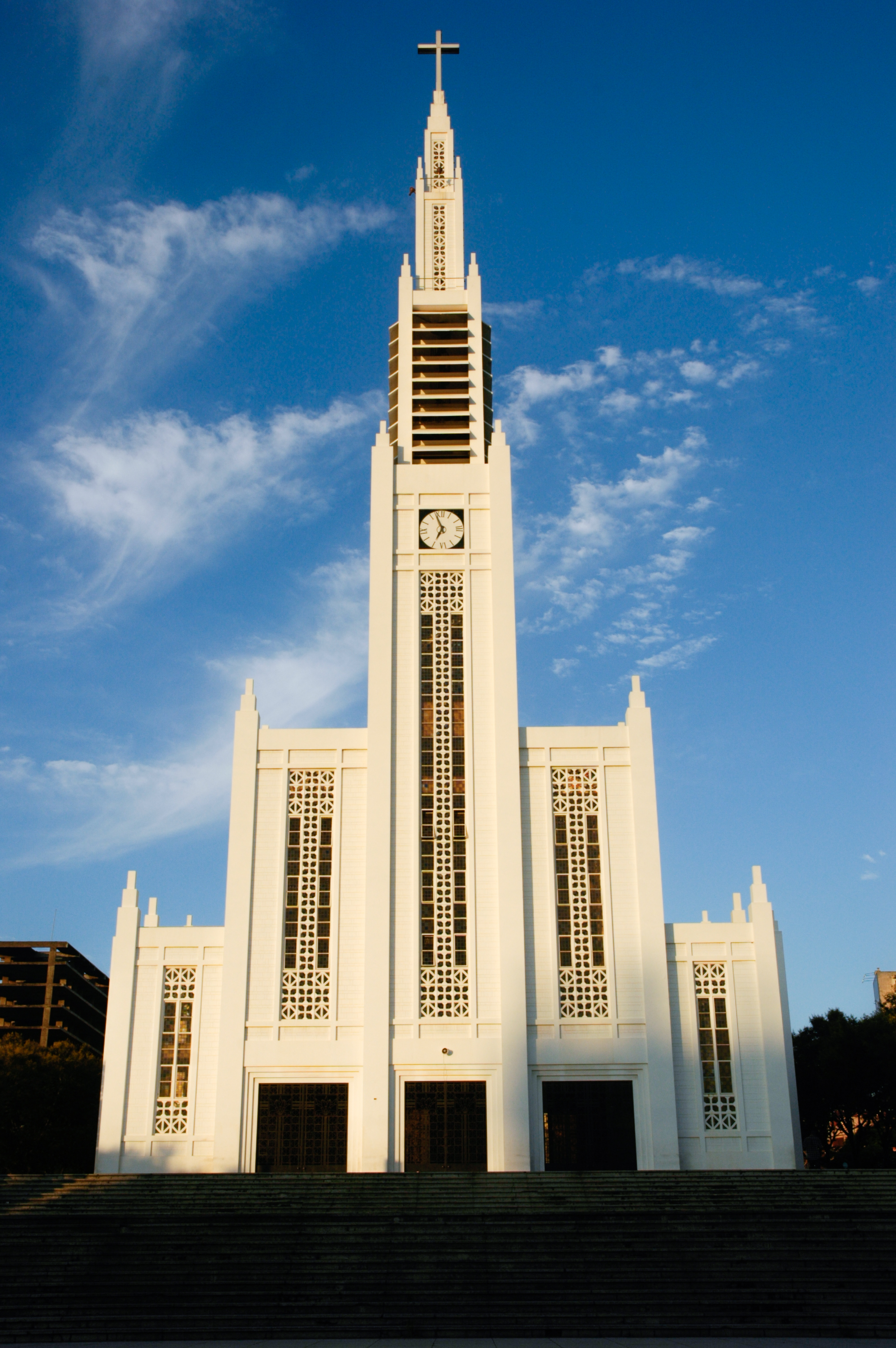
- Our Lady of the Immaculate Conception Cathedral, Maputo

Location
- Country: Mozambique
- Ecclesiastical province: Maputo

Statistics
- Population: Total; Catholics: (as of 2013); 4,661,000; 1,134,000 (24.3%)

Information
- Denomination: Roman Catholic
- Rite: Roman Rite
- Established: 21 January 1612
- Cathedral: Our Lady of the Immaculate Conception Cathedral

Current leadership
- Pope: Leo XIV
- Archbishop: João Carlos Hatoa Nunes
- Auxiliary Bishops: António Juliasse Ferreira Sandramo
- Bishops emeritus: Alexandre José Maria Cardinal dos Santos, O.F.M. Francisco Chimoio, OFM Cap

Website
- www.arquidiocesedemaputo.org

The Roman Catholic Archdiocese of Maputo (Latin: Maputensis) is the Metropolitan See for the ecclesiastical province of Maputo in Mozambique.

== History ==
- 21 January 1612: Established as a prelature nullius from the Diocese of Goa
- 1783: Promoted as Territorial Prelature of Mozambique
- 4 September 1940: Promoted as Archdiocese of Lourenço Marques
- 18 September 1976: Renamed Archdiocese of Maputo

== Cathedral ==
The seat of the archbishop is the Cathedral of Our Lady of the Immaculate Conception (Catedral Metropolitana de Nossa Senhora da Conceição) in Maputo.

== Bishops ==
=== Ordinaries ===
==== Prelates Nullius of Mozambique ====
- Domingos Torrado, O.S.A. (1612), auxiliary bishop of Goa, named by Pope Paul VI but died in Goa before leaving for Africa

...

==== Prelates of Mozambique ====
- Amaro José de São Tomás, OP (18 July 1783 – 18 July 1801)
- Vasco José a Domina Nostra de Bona Morte Lobo, CRSA (26 June 1805 – 17 December 1811)
- Joaquim de Nossa Senhora de Nazareth Oliveira e Abreu, OFM Ref (17 December 1811 – 23 August 1819), appointed Bishop of São Luís do Maranhão, Brazil
- Bartholomeu de Martyribus Maya, OCD (10 November 1819 – 1828)
- Antonio Tomas da Silva Leitão e Castro (30 January 1883 – 27 March 1884), appointed Bishop of Angola e Congo, Angola
- Henrique José Reed da Silva (27 March 1884 – 14 March 1887), appointed Bishop of São Tomé of Meliapore, India
- Antonio Dias Ferreira (14 March 1887 – 1 June 1891), appointed Bishop of Angola e Congo, Angola
- António José de Sousa Barroso (12 February 1891 – 11 October 1897), appointed Bishop of São Tomé of Meliapore, India
- Sebastião José Pereira (16 November 1897 – 23 July 1900)
- Antonio José Gomes Cardoso (Apostolic administrator; 17 December 1900 – 23 July 1901)
- António Moutinho (21 August 1901 – 14 November 1904), appointed Bishop of Santiago de Cabo Verde, Cape Verde
- Francisco Ferreira da Silva (14 November 1904 – 8 May 1920)
- Joaquim Rafael Maria d’Assunçâo Pitinho, OFM (16 December 1920 – 15 November 1935), appointed Bishop of Santiago de Cabo Verde, Cape Verde
- Teodósio de Gouveia (18 May 1936 – 4 September 1940 see below); future Cardinal

==== Archbishops of Maputo ====
Until 1976, the Archbishop of Maputo was titled the Archbishop of Lourenço Marques.

1. Teodósio de Gouveia (see above 4 September 1940 – 6 February 1962) (Cardinal in 1946; attended 1958 papal conclave)
2. Custódio Alvim Pereira (3 August 1962 – 26 August 1974)
3. Alexandre José Maria dos Santos, OFM (23 December 1974 – 22 February 2003) (Cardinal in 1988)
4. Francisco Chimoio, OFM Cap (22 February 2003 – 5 May 2023)
5. João Carlos Hatoa Nunes (since 5 May 2023 – ...)

=== Auxiliary Bishops ===
- António Juliasse Ferreira Sandramo (2018-)
- João Carlos Hatoa Nunes (2011–2017), appointed Bishop of Chimoio
- Adriano Langa, O.F.M. (1997–2005), appointed Coadjutor Bishop of Inhambane
- Custódio Alvim Pereira (1958–1962), appointed Archbishop here
- Osório Citora Afonso, I.M.C., appointed Bishop of Quelimane on 25 July 2025.

=== Other priests of this diocese who became bishops ===
- Ernesto Maguengue, appointed Bishop of Pemba in 2004
- Lucio Andrice Muandula, appointed Bishop of Xai-Xai in 2004

== Suffragan dioceses ==
- Inhambane
- Xai-Xai

== See also ==
- Catholic Church in Mozambique
