= Lucio Andrice Muandula =

Mozambican Catholic prelate (born 1959)

The Most Reverend Lucio Andrice Muandula
- Bishop of Chimoio, Mozambique
- Church: Catholic Church
- Archdiocese: Roman Catholic Archdiocese of Beira
- See: Roman Catholic Diocese of Chimoio
- Appointed: 17 December 2025
- Installed: 22 February 2026
- Predecessor: João Carlos Hatoa Nunes
- Successor: Incumbent
- Other posts: Bishop of Xai-Xai, Mozambique (24 June 2004 - 17 December 2025)

Orders
- Ordination: 14 May 1989 by Alexandre José Maria dos Santos
- Consecration: 24 October 2004 by Cardinal Alexandre José Maria dos Santos

Personal details
- Born: Lucio Andrice Muandula; 9 October 1959 (age 66) Maputo, Archdiocese of Maputo, Mozambique

Styles of Lucio Andrice Muandula
- Reference style: His Eminence
- Spoken style: Your Eminence
- Religious style: Monsignor

Lucio Andrice Muandula (born 9 October 1959) is a Mozambican prelate of the Catholic Church who is the bishop of the Diocese of Chimoio since 17 December 2025. Prior to that, he was the bishop of Xai-Xai since 2004. He was president of the Episcopal Conference of Mozambique from 2009 to 2015 and from 2018 to 2021 and president of the Inter-Regional Meeting of the Bishops of Southern Africa (IMBISA) from 2019 to 2022. He has been second vice president of the Symposium of Episcopal Conferences of Africa and Madagascar (SECAM) since 2019.

== Biography ==
Lucio Andrice Muandula was born in Maputo, then known as Lourenço Marques, on 9 October 1959, the second of eleven children. He was ordained a priest on 14 May 1989 by Cardinal Alexandre José Maria dos Santos. He served as parish vicar of the cathedral parish as well as secretary and chancellor of the archdiocese from 1989 to 1991. He was professor of theology at the "Sant'Agostino" Major Seminary for the year 1991–1992.

Studying in Rome from 1992 to 2003, he earned a licentiate in sacred scripture at the Pontifical Biblical Institute and a doctorate in biblical theology at the Pontifical Gregorian University. He returned to Mozambique in July 2003 to become parish priest of the cathedral parish in Maputo and a professor at the "San Pio X" Interdiocesan Theological Seminary.

On 12 July 2004, Pope John Paul II appointed him Bishop of Xai-Xai. He received his episcopal consecration on 24 October 2004 from Archbishop emeritus dos Santos, assisted by Francisco Chimoio, Archbishop of Maputo and Júlio Duarte Langa, the retiring bishop of Xai-Xai. He was installed in Xai-Xai on 7 November 2004

At the synod of bishops on the eucharist on 6 October 2005 he pled for an "urgent and necessary" call for "the fair distribution of priests in the world".

In 2009, he visited the Diocese of Formosa in Argentina, which sends missionaries to Xia-Xia and others areas of Mozambique.

On 31 January 2013, Pope Benedict XVI named him a member of the Pontifical Council for the Pastoral Care of Migrants.

As president of the Episcopal Conference of Mozambique he participated in the 2014 session of the Synod on the Family. On 9 October, he delivered a homily as the morning session began, reflecting on the need to "let ourselves be guided by biblical wisdom" as "we are called to establish a dialogue of faith" even as "one risks losing one's trust in God, to adopt a completely pagan lifestyle".

On 10 November 2018, he was elected president of the Mozambique Bishops Conference.

In July 2019 he was elected to a three-year term as second vice president of SECAM. He was elected to a second term in July 2022.

In September 2019, he was host to Pope Francis, who met privately with a delegation from Xia-Xia in recognition of a pairing established between the Diocese of Xia-Xia and the Archdiocese of Buenos Aires before he became pope.

In 2019 he was elected president of the Inter-Regional Meeting of the Bishops of Southern Africa (IMBISA), and he presided over its 2022 plenary assembly in Namibia.

On 15 March 2023, Cardinal Mario Grech named him to the six-member preparatory commission for the next Synod of Bishops.

On 17 December 2025, Pope Leo XIV transferred him to the Diocese of Chimoio, Mozambique and appointed him local ordinary there. He was installed at Chimoio on 22 February 2026.

== Succession table ==
Catholic Church titles
Preceded by Júlio Duarte Langa (31 May 1976 - 12 July 2004)	Bishop of Xai-Xai (24 June 2004 - 17 December 2025)	Succeeded by (Vacant)
Preceded by João Carlos Hatoa Nunes (2 January 2017 - 15 November 2022)	Bishop of Chimoio (since 17 December 2025)	Succeeded by Incumbent
