= Alexandre José Maria dos Santos =

Mozambican Roman Catholic cardinal (1924–2021)

His Eminence Alexandre José Maria dos Santos O.F.M.
- Archbishop Emeritus of Maputo
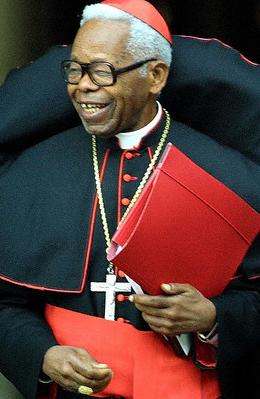
- Church: Roman Catholic Church
- Archdiocese: Maputo
- See: Maputo
- Appointed: 18 September 1976
- Retired: 22 February 2003
- Predecessor: Custódio Alvim Pereira
- Successor: Francisco Chimoio
- Other post: Cardinal-Priest of San Frumenzio ai Prati Fiscali (1988–2021)
- Previous post: Archbishop of Laurençco Marques (1974–76)

Orders
- Ordination: 25 June 1953 by Manuel Gonçalves Cerejeira
- Consecration: 9 March 1975 by Agnelo Rossi
- Created cardinal: 28 June 1988 by Pope John Paul II
- Rank: Cardinal-Priest

Personal details
- Born: Alexandre José Maria dos Santos; 18 March 1924 Zavala, Mozambique
- Died: 29 September 2021 (aged 97) Maputo, Mozambique
- Motto: Servir e não ser servido ("To serve, not to be served")
- Coat of arms

Alexandre José Maria dos Santos (18 March 1924 – 29 September 2021) was a Mozambican Roman Catholic cardinal. He was the first native cardinal of Mozambique.

The Coat of arms of Alexandre Jose Maria dos Santos, who was a Cardinal of the Roman Catholic Church.

== Ecclesiastical career ==
Dos Santos was born in Zavala, Mozambique. He studied in Nyasaland and Lisbon before being ordained a Roman Catholic priest in 1953, becoming the first black Mozambican to receive the distinction. In 1973 he became the first African to run a seminary in Mozambique. He was archbishop of Maputo, between 1975 and 2003. On 26 June 1988, he was created a cardinal by Pope John Paul II, and given the titular church of San Frumenzio ai Prati Fiscali. He was instrumental in the peace process surrounding the end of the Mozambican Civil War. He did not participate in the conclaves of 2005 and 2013, because he was over the age limit by then.

Catholic Church titles
Preceded by Custódio Alvim Pereira	Archbishop of Maputo; 23 December 1974 – 22 February 2003	Succeeded by Francisco Chimoio
Titular church created	Cardinal Priest of San Frumenzio ai Prati Fiscali; 28 June 1988 – 29 September 2021	Succeeded by Robert Walter McElroy
