= Roman Catholic Archdiocese of Nampula =

Roman Catholic archdiocese in Mozambique

Coordinates: 15°07′S 39°16′E

Archdiocese of Nampula Archidioecesis Nampulensis

Location
- Country: Mozambique
- Ecclesiastical province: Nampula

Statistics
- Population: Total; Catholics: (as of 2015); 4,000,000; 536,700 (13.4%)

Information
- Denomination: Roman Catholic
- Rite: Roman Rite
- Established: 4 September 1940
- Cathedral: Our Lady of Fatima Cathedral

Current leadership
- Pope: Leo XIV
- Archbishop: Inácio Saure, I.M.C.
- Auxiliary Bishops: Ernesto Maguengue

The Roman Catholic Archdiocese of Nampula (Latin: Nampulen(sis)) is an archbishopric and the metropolitan see for one of the three ecclesiastical provinces in Mozambique in (south)eastern Africa, yet still depends on the missionary Roman Congregation for the Evangelization of Peoples.

Its cathedral is the Catedral Metropolitana de Nossa Senhora de Fátima, dedicated to the diocesan patron saint Our Lady of Fatima, in Nampula.

== History ==
The Diocese of Nampula was established on 4 September 1940 by Pope Pius XII's papal bull Sollemnibus Conventionibus, on territory split off from the Territorial Prelature of Mozambique, which was simultaneously promoted and became its metropolitan as the Archdiocese of Lourenço Marques (now Maputo).

Nampula first lost territory on 5 April 1957, to establish the Diocese of Porto Amélia (now its suffragan Pemba) and later on 21 July 1963, to establish the Diocese of Vila Cabral (now its suffragan Lichinga).

On 4 June 1984, it was promoted to the Metropolitan Archdiocese of Nampula by Pope John Paul II's papal bull, Quo efficacius; he made a papal visit in September 1988.

Nampula lost territory on 11 October 1991, to establish the Diocese of Nacala as its suffragan.

== Statistics ==
As per 2014, it pastorally served 485,813 Catholics (13.7% of 3,547,000 total) on 51,000 km^{2} in 40 parishes and a mission with 75 priests (36 diocesan, 39 religious), 270 lay religious (96 brothers, 174 sisters) and 19 seminarians.

== Ecclesiastical province ==
Its suffragan sees were all daughters (comment refers to three dioceses in this province before Gurué was shifted here from another province) :

- Roman Catholic Diocese of Alto Molócuè
- Roman Catholic Diocese of Gurué
- Roman Catholic Diocese of Lichinga (formerly Vila Cabral)
- Roman Catholic Diocese of Nacala
- Roman Catholic Diocese of Pemba (formerly Porto Amélia),

== Episcopal ordinaries ==
(all Roman rite)

Suffragan Bishops of Nampula

- Teófilo José Pereira de Andrade, Friars Minor (O.F.M.) (born Portugal) (1941.05.12 – retired 1951.02.17), emeritus as Titular Bishop of Urusi (1951.02.17 – death 1954.10.25)
- Manuel de Medeiros Guerreiro (?Portuguese) (1951.03.02 – retired 1966.11.30), previously Bishop of the Roman Catholic Diocese of São Tomé de Meliapor (India) (1937.04.10 – 1951.03.02); emeritus as Titular Bishop of Præcausa (1966.11.30 – resigned 1971.01.27), died 1978
- Manuel Vieira Pinto (1967.04.21 – 1984.06.04 see below), President of Episcopal Conference of Mozambique (1975 – 1976)

Metropolitan Archbishops of Nampula

- Manuel Vieira Pinto (see above 1984.06.04 – retired 2000.11.16), also Apostolic Administrator of the suffragan Diocese of Pemba (Mozambique) (1992.12.12 – 1998.01.18)
  - Auxiliary Bishop Germano Grachane, Lazarists (C.M.) (1990.01.22 – 1991.10.11), Titular Bishop of Thunusuda (1990.01.22 – 1991.10.11); later first bishop of suffragan daughter see Nacala (Mozambique) (1991.10.11 – ...)
- Tomé Makhweliha, Dehonians (S.C.I.) (2000.11.16 - retired 2016.07.25), also President of Episcopal Conference of Mozambique (2006 – 2009); previously Bishop of Pemba (Mozambique) (1997.10.24 – 2000.11.16)
  - Apostolic Administrator Ernesto Maguengue (2016.07.25 - ...), while Titular Bishop of Furnos Minor (2014.08.06 – ...) as Auxiliary Bishop of Nampula (2014.08.06 – ...); previously Bishop of the Pemba (Mozambique) (2004.06.24 – 2012.10.27)
- Inácio Saure, (I.M.C.) (2017.04.11 – ...), previously Bishop of the Tete (Mozambique) (2011.04.12 – 2017.04.11).

== Incidents ==
In 2025, Archbishop Inácio Saure complained of illegal occupation of Church lands by squatters. In an article in Aid to the Church in Need, local Church sources imply that the squatters have the backing of the Government, and that the occupations are retaliation for the bishops' outspokenness on issues such as the state's crackdown on protesters in the social unrest following the 2024 general election, and the handling of the insurgency in Cabo Delgado.

== See also ==
- List of Catholic dioceses in Mozambique
- Roman Catholicism in Mozambique

== Sources and external links ==
- GCatholic.org - data for all sections
