= Catholic Church in Mozambique =

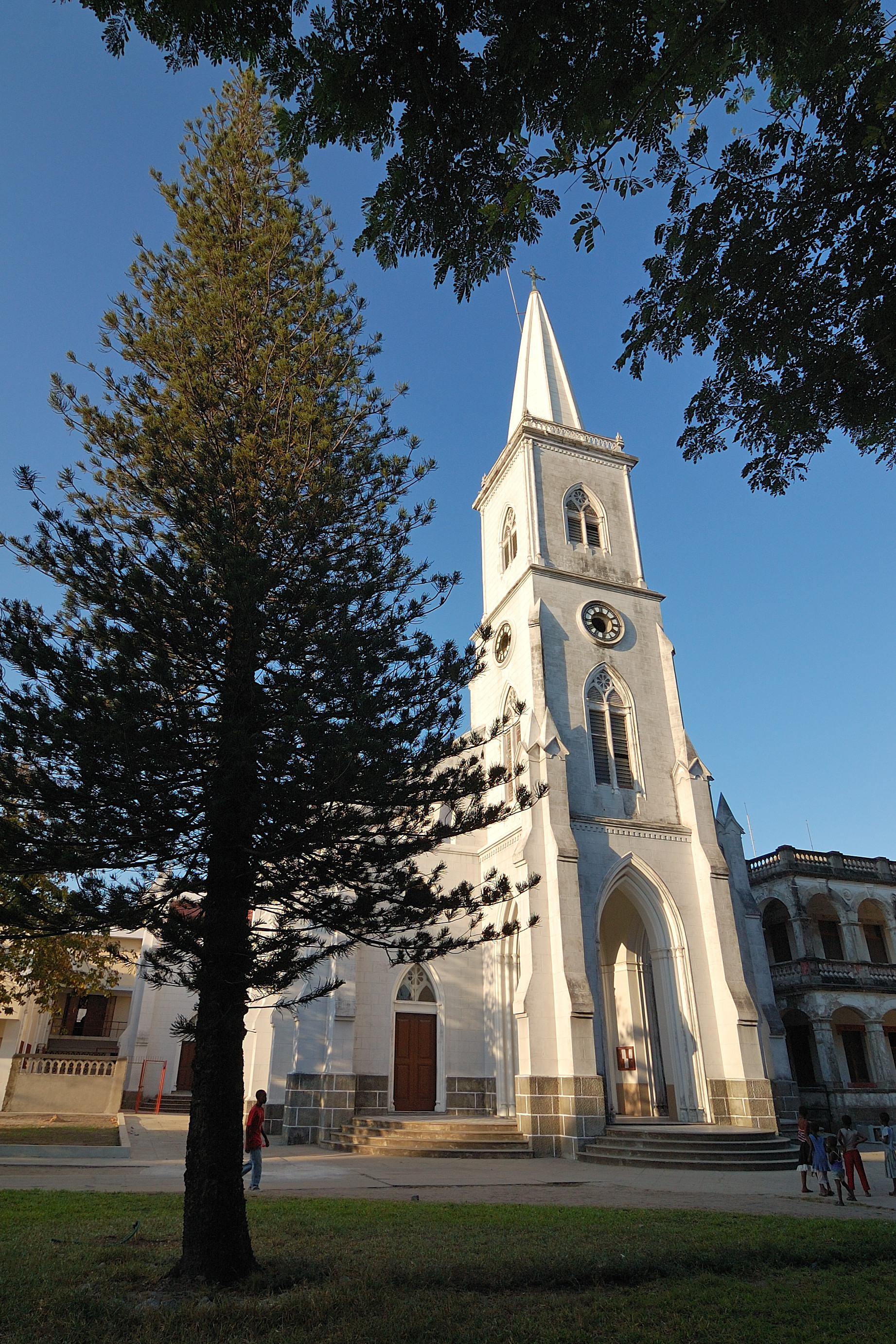
Beira Cathedral

The Catholic Church in Mozambique is part of the worldwide Catholic Church, under the spiritual leadership of the Pope in Rome.

There are over 8.54 million Catholics in Mozambique, 27% of the population. The country is divided into 13 dioceses including three archdioceses.

== History ==
The first mission was started by Portuguese Franciscans in 1500.

Alexandre José Maria dos Santos became the first indigenous bishop to become cardinal in 1988 and played an important role in brokering the peace agreement that ended Mozambique’s long civil war. Pope John Paul II visited the country in 1988.

Since the start of the insurgency in Cabo Delgado in October 2017, Catholics have faced repeatedly attacks by the Islamist group Ansar al-Sunna, also known as Islamic State of Mozambique. As such, Catholics have been killed or kidnapped and their homes, social institutions and churches burned. While according to locals the insurgents in general do not discriminate between Muslims and Christians, but there have been attacks on specifically Christian communities and in certain cases people were separated people by religion and Christians executed. In September 2022, Ansar al-Sunna attacked a Catholic mission in Nampula, killing an elderly missionary and burning down several structures. Since 2023, reports have emerged that the Islamists are forcefully converting Christian women to Islam and turning some of them into sex slaves.

After a relative period of peace, renewed attacks in 2024 forced many priests, nuns and other Church workers to flee to cities already overwhelmed by internally displaced people. In a terrorist attack on Mazeze in the Diocese of Pemba, the church and offices of the Our Lady of Africa mission were set ablaze. Violence continues in 2025, with four villagers having been killed in November, one of them beheaded. Pope Francis mentioned the conflict in Cabo Delgado on a number of occasions, and Pope Leo XIV mentioned it for the first time on 24 August 2025.

== Dioceses ==
=== Ecclesiastical province of Beira ===
- Archdiocese of Beira
- Diocese of Chimoio
- Diocese of Quelimane
- Diocese of Tete

=== Ecclesiastical province of Maputo ===
- Archdiocese of Maputo
- Diocese of Inhambane
- Diocese of Xai-Xai

=== Ecclesiastical province of Nampula ===
- Archdiocese of Nampula
- Diocese of Alto Molócuè
- Diocese of Gurúè
- Diocese of Lichinga
- Diocese of Nacala
- Diocese of Pemba

== Church-State relations ==
Catholicism is the largest religion in Mozambique, but relations with the state have not always been easy. Following independence, in 1975, the Marxist FRELIMO-led government was hostile to the Church. The Catholic Church's role, through the Sant'Egidio movement, in ending the Mozambican Civil War improved the Church's standing, but according to Archbishop Inácio Saure, of Nampula, there is still room for improvement.

"“We used to have open war against the Church, but that doesn’t exist anymore. However, the current context leaves much to be desired. A preliminary agreement was signed between the Holy See and the Mozambican Government in 2011, but the actual implementation is a very, very distant reality”, he told The Pillar, in September 2025.

The archbishop added that although religious freedom exists in theory, "there is more to religious liberty than simply being allowed to pray in your church or your mosque. When you can really live your faith, and get involved in social issues, that is real religious liberty".

Archbishop Saure has been critical of the Government's response to social unrest and to the insurgency in Cabo Delgado, and admitted that this could be risky. "I have been warned, I’ve been told that my words are not being well received, even though I’ve never directly criticized a party, or the government. But I do feel obliged to speak the truth. Am I going to have to pay a price for that? I don’t know. But unfortunately, those who raise their voices are often silenced", he said.

The archbishop complained of illegal occupation of Church lands in Nampula, a fact that some voices in the Church believe is being carried out with the complicity of the Government, as retaliation for his outspokenness.

In 2021 the former bishop of Pemba, Luiz Fernando Lisboa, admitted to having been removed from his post by Pope Francis, and sent back to his native Brazil, because he was being threatened by the Government over his criticism on the handling of the insurgency in Cabo Delgado.

== See also ==
- Religion in Mozambique
- Protestantism in Mozambique
- Christian Council of Mozambique

== Sources ==
- CRUZ CORREIA, Francisco Augusto da, O Método missionário dos Jesuítas em Moçambique, 1881.1910. Um contributo para a História da Missão da Zambézia, Braga: Livraria A.I., 1991, 471p.
- FERREIRA, L., Igreja Ministerial em Moçambique. Caminhos de hoje e de amanhã (Lisbon, 1987)
- LUZIA, J., “A Igreja das Palhotas. Génese da Igreja em Moçambique, entre o Colonialismo e a Independencia”, Cadernos de Estudos Africanos (Lisbon), 4 (1989), 127p.
- MORIER-GENOUD, Eric, Catholicism and the Making of Politics in Central Mozambique, 1940-1980, Rocherster: Rochester University Press, coll. ‘Rochester Studies in African History and the Diaspora’, 2019
- MORIER-GENOUD, Eric & ANOUILH, Pierre “Revolution, War and Democracy. The Catholic Church in Mozambique” in Paul C. Manuel, Alynna Lyon & Clyde Wilcox (eds), Religion and Politics in a Global Society. Comparative Perspectives from the Portuguese-Speaking World (Lanham: Lexington, 2012)
- MORIER-GENOUD, Eric, “The Vatican vs. Lisbon. The relaunching of the Catholic church in Mozambique, ca. 1875-1940”, BAB Working Papers, Basel (Switzerland), n°4, 2002, 16p
- SCHEBESTA, Paul., Portugals Konquistamission in Südost-Afrika (Steyler, St. Augustin, 1966)
- SILVA, Anónio da, Mentalidade missiológica dos Jesuítas em Moçambique antes de 1759. Esboço ideológico a partir do núcleo documental, Lisbon : Junta de Investigação do Ultrama, 1967, 2 vol.
- SOUSA, José Augusto Alves de, Os Jesuítas em Moçambique, 1541-1991. No cinquentenário do quarto período da nossa Missão, Braga: Libraria Apostolado da Imprensa, 1991
- SOUSA, José. Augusto Alves de & CORREIA, F. da C., 500 anos de evangelização em Moçambique (Paulinas, Maputo, 1998)
