= List of cathedrals in Mozambique =

This is a list of cathedrals in Mozambique sorted by denomination.

== Catholic ==
Cathedrals of the Catholic Church in Mozambique:

Image	Cathedral	Location	Diocese	Year(s) built
	Our Lady Queen of the World	Alto Molocue	Alto Molocue	
	Our Lady of the Rosary Cathedral	Beira	Beira	1900–1925
	Cathedral of Mary Immaculate	Chimoio	Chimoio	1943
	Cathedral of St. Anthony of Lisbon	Gurúè	Gurúè	
	Our Lady of the Immaculate Conception Cathedral	Inhambane	Inhambane	1974
	Old Cathedral of Inhambane	Inhambane	Inhambane	
	St. Joseph Cathedral	Lichinga	Lichinga	1946
	Cathedral of Our Lady of the Immaculate Conception	Maputo	Maputo	1936–1944
	Cathedral of Our Lady of Good Voyage	Nacala	Nacala	1955
	Cathedral of Our Lady of Fatima	Nampula	Nampula	1942–56
	Cathedral of St. Paul	Pemba	Pemba	1942
	Cathedral of Our Lady of Liberation	Quelimane	Quelimane	1976
	Old Cathedral of Quelimane	Quelimane	Quelimane	1776–1786
	Cathedral of St. James the Major	Tete	Tete	
	Cathedral of St. John the Baptist	Xai-Xai	Xai-Xai	1562

== Anglican ==
Cathedrals of the Anglican Church of Southern Africa:

Image	Cathedral	Location	Diocese	Year(s) built
	Cathedral of St. Augustine	Maciene	Lebombo	
	St. Bartholomew's Cathedral	Messumba	Niassa	

== See also ==
- Lists of cathedrals
