= Old Cathedral of Quelimane =

- Church of Our Lady of Liberation
- Igreja de Nossa Senhora do Livramento
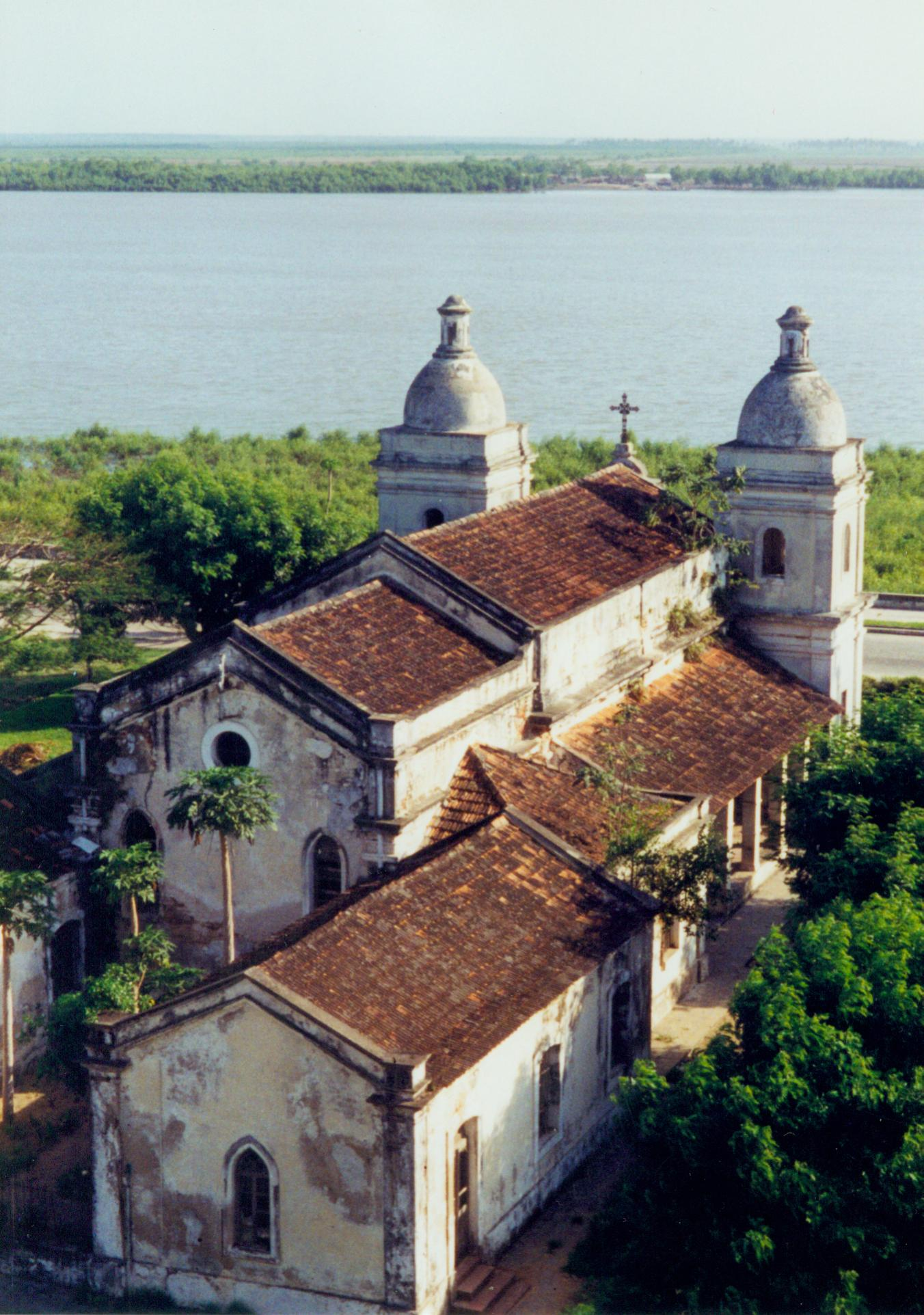
- Old Cathedral of Quelimane
- 17.8810°S 36.8845°E
- Location: Quelimane
- Country: Mozambique
- Denomination: Roman Catholic

History
- Founder: Baltasar Pereira do Lago

Architecture
- Functional status: Inactive
- Style: Portuguese colonial
- Years built: 1776-1786
- Completed: 1786
- Closed: 1976

Administration
- Diocese: Quelimane

The Church of Our Lady of Liberation (Portuguese: Igreja de Nossa Senhora do Livramento), commonly known as the Old Cathedral (Portuguese: Catedral Velha), is an 18th-century Roman Catholic church in Quelimane, Mozambique. It is located at the southern end of the city, facing the banks of the Quelimane River. Built by Portuguese missionaries in the 1770s and 80s, it was named a national monument in 1943. Upon the establishment of the Diocese of Quelimane in 1954, it was elevated to cathedral status. When the New Cathedral of Quelimane was completed in 1976, the old cathedral was abandoned. Although it has fallen into decay, it remains a city landmark and a tourist attraction, and there are plans to restore the building in 2018.

== History ==
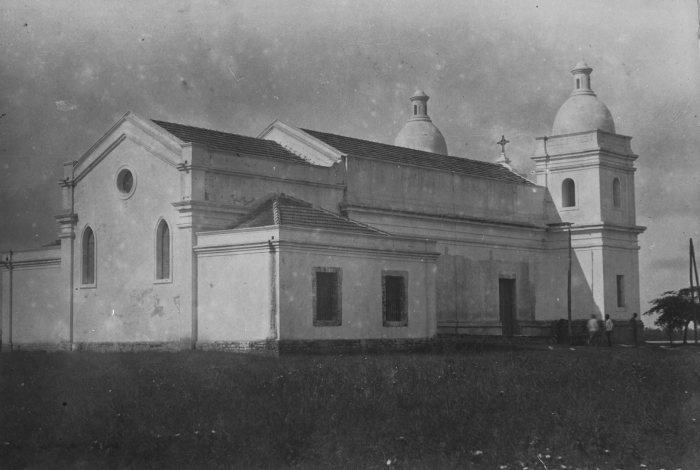
The church around the turn of the 20th-century

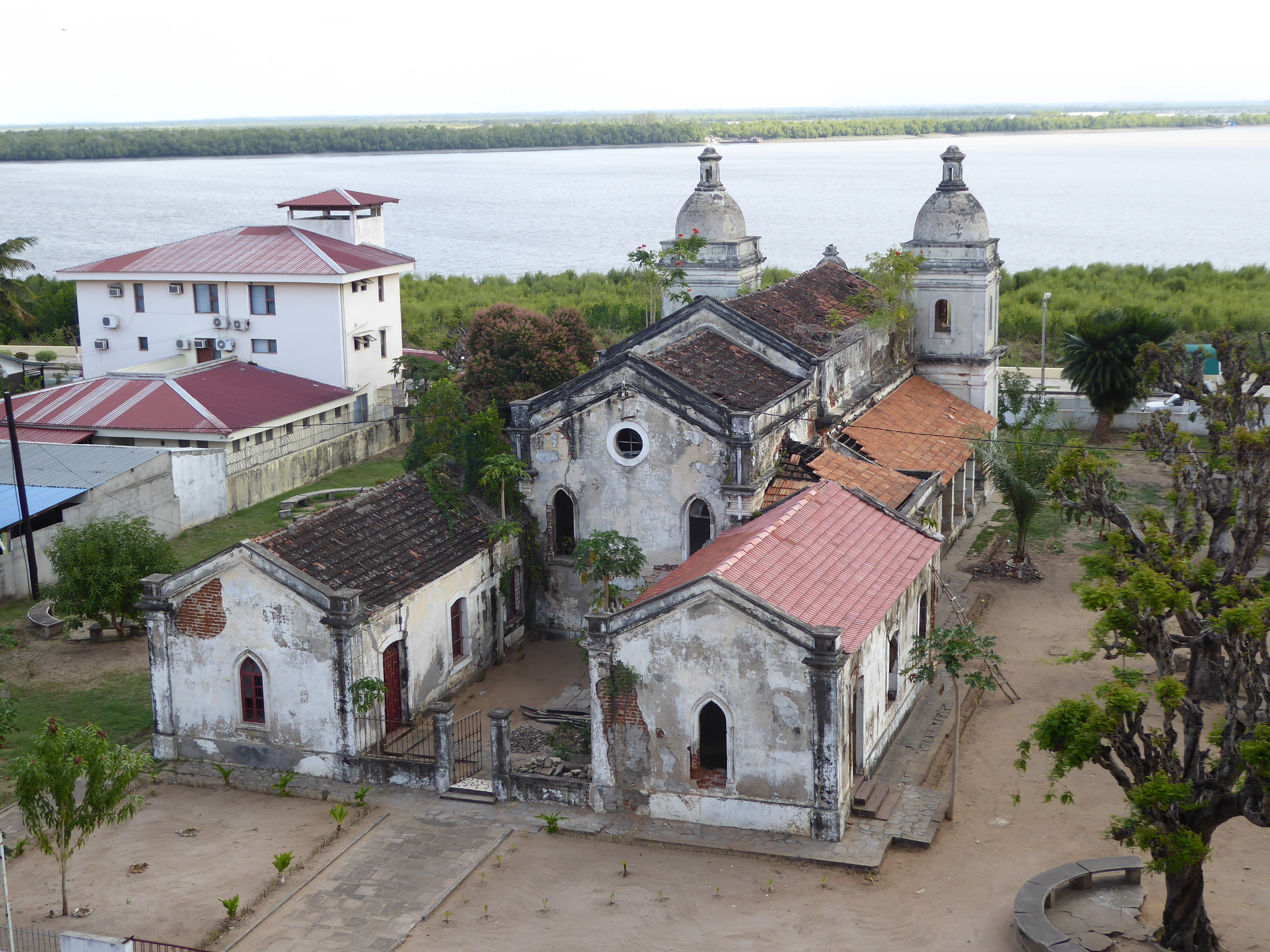
The old cathedral, 2017

Portuguese missionaries began building the church in 1776. According to local tradition, the cathedral was built on the site near where Vasco da Gama tied his ships to a large tree while en route to India in 1498. The church's construction began under Governor Baltasar Manuel Pereira do Lago, but stopped after his death. Construction resumed under Governor António de Melo e Castro. It was completed in 1786 and dedicated as the Church of Our Lady of Liberation (Portuguese: Igreja de Nossa Senhora do Livramento). Its design was reportedly based on the Sé Cathedral in Goa, India.

On 3 August 1943, it was declared a national monument of Portuguese Mozambique, for its historical significance to Zambezia Province, and especially Quelimane. On 6 October 1954, the Diocese of Quelimane was erected with territory taken from the Diocese of Beira. That year, Our Lady of Liberation was inaugurated as the diocese's cathedral. When the New Cathedral of Quelimane was completed, the old cathedral was used by other religious congregations, but gradually fell into disuse and neglect. As the cathedral became visibly abandoned, it became frequented by criminals, making it dangerous to visit. It also became home to around ten street children. Over the years, church officials made efforts to restore the cathedral, but were unable to raise the necessary funds. All the diocese could afford was the construction of temporary fencing to protect the historic building from intruders.

In 2017, plans were announced to restore the old cathedral by 2018. In an agreement signed in August 2017 between the Diocese of Quelimane, the owner of the property, and the Bons Sinais Association, a local civic organization, it was intended for the building to be restored for Quelimane's 75-year anniversary as a city. Per the agreement, the Catholic diocese would retain ownership of the cathedral, which would become a cultural and educational center. On 19 November 2017, Bishop Hilário da Cruz Massinga estimated the total cost of the restoration project at €500,000.

== Architecture ==
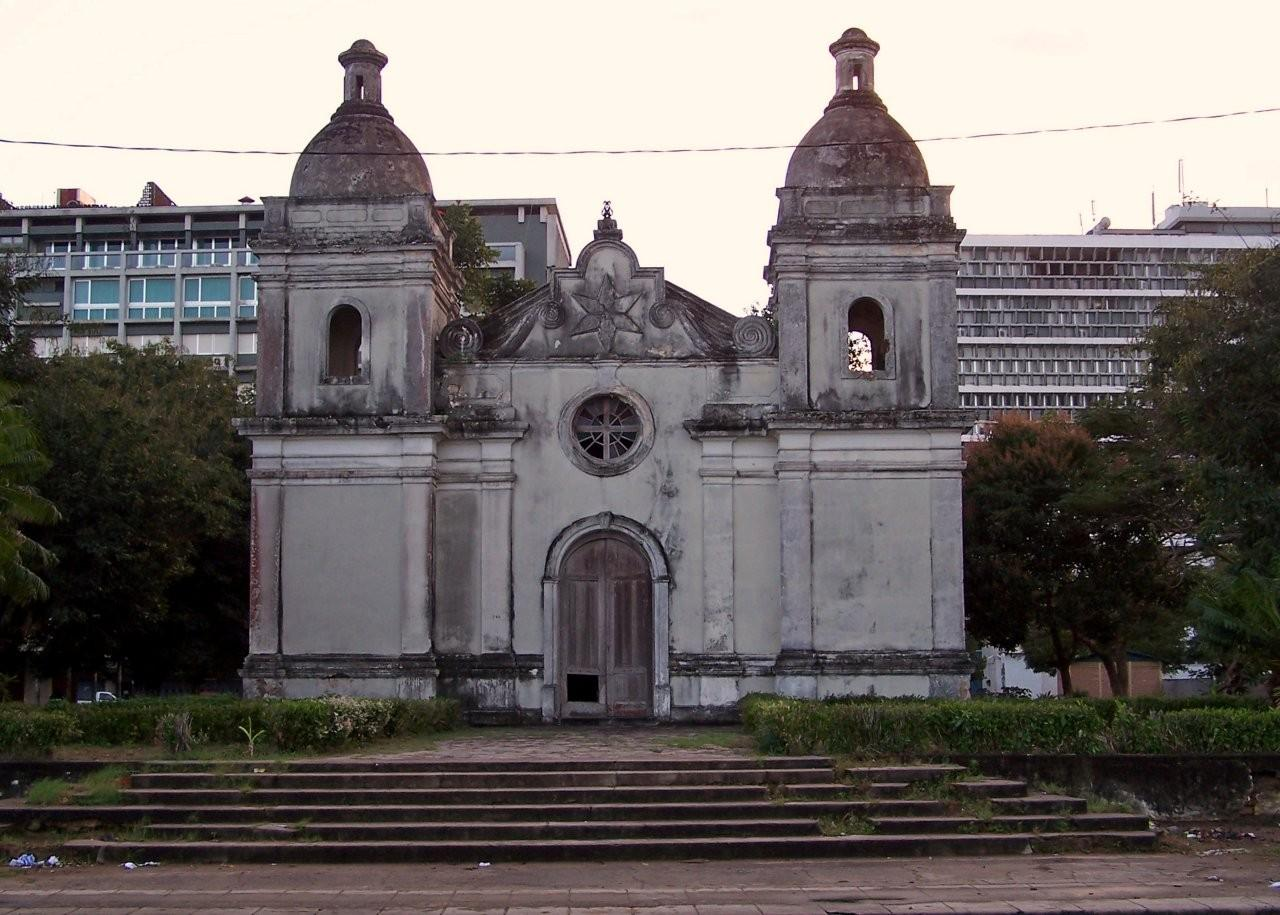
The facade of the old cathedral

The cathedral is built in Portuguese colonial style, and its design was reportedly based on the Sé Cathedral in Goa, India. It has been described as in the Mannerist and Indo-Portuguese traditions. A "magnificent" yet "austere" building, it has been compared to the 17th-century Church of Our Lady of Nazareth in Luanda, and the 18th-century Church of Our Lady of Pópulo in Benguela, both in Angola. The cathedral faces the Quelimane River. A stout building, its facade consists of a pediment flanked by two domed bell towers. The building's sides include covered galleries, which are commonly featured in Indian churches.

== Ordinaries ==
During the church's period as the cathedral from 1954 to 1976, it served as the seat of the Bishop of Quelimane. Those two ordinaries are as follows:

1. Francisco Nunes Teixeira (1955–1975)
2. Bernardo Filipe Governo, OFMCap (1976–1976)

== Burials ==
The Old Cathedral of Quelimane holds six tombs dating from the 19th-century, including several children. The first to be buried in the church was Captain Mor (1795-1843), whose four children constructed the tomb. The next, Maria Joana da Cunha, died in Quelimane just before her 16th birthday in 1846. Her husband, Manuel Velosa da Rocha, arranged for her to be entombed in the church. In 1855, 1½-year-old Emília António Generoso was buried. Two-year-old Carlos Fortunato Generoso was buried in the cathedral by his parents, Emília de Assunção Generoso and Cristóvão Colombo, a noted sailor and cartographer. The last to be buried in the church was Father Francisco, a Goan priest, born in 1820, who arrived in Quelimane in 1845. He was named vicar of the church by royal decree in 1847, and named a member of the Order of Christ in 1858. His tomb was commissioned by his brother, Joaquim Henrique da Nazaret.

== See also ==
- List of cathedrals in Mozambique
