= Roman Catholic Diocese of Caia =

Roman Catholic diocese in Mozambique

Coordinates: 17°50′S 35°20′E

Diocese of Caia Dioecesis Caianus

Location
- Country: Mozambique
- Metropolitan: Beira

Statistics
- Area: 54,569 km^{2} (21,069 sq mi)
- Population: Total; Catholics: (as of 2025); 1,603,063; 153,149 (19.6%)

Information
- Rite: Latin Rite

Current leadership
- Pope: Pope Leo XIV
- Bishop: António Manuel Bogaio Constantino

The Roman Catholic Diocese of Caia (Latin: Dioecesis Caianus) is a diocese located in the city of Caia in Sofala Province, in the ecclesiastical province of Beira in Mozambique.

== History ==
- 23 December 2025: Established as Diocese of Caia from territory sourced from the Diocese of Beira, Diocese of Chimoio, Diocese of Quelimane and the Diocese of Tete. The new diocese made a suffragan of the Roman Catholic Archdiocese of Beira.

== Cathedral ==
The Cathedral of Saint Matthew the Apostle (Portuguese: Paróquia São Mateus Apóstolo) located in the city of Caia, Sofala Province, is the Diocesan Cathedral since the creation of the diocese.

== Leadership ==
- Bishops of Caia (Roman rite)
  - Bishop António Manuel Bogaio Constantino, M.C.C.I. (since 23 December 2025).

== See also ==
- Roman Catholicism in Mozambique
