= Diamantino Guapo Antunes =

Portuguese Catholic prelate (born 1966)

The Most Reverend Diamantino Guapo Antunes
- Bishop of Tete, Mozambique
- Church: Catholic Church
- Archdiocese: Roman Catholic Archdiocese of Beira
- See: Roman Catholic Diocese of Tete
- Appointed: 22 March 2019
- Installed: 12 May 2019
- Predecessor: Inácio Saure
- Successor: Incumbent

Orders
- Ordination: 21 June 1998
- Consecration: 12 May 2019 by Inácio Saure
- Rank: Bishop

Personal details
- Born: Diamantino Guapo Antunes; 30 November 1966 (age 59) Albergaria dos Doze, Diocese of Leiria, Portugal

Styles of Diamantino Guapo Antunes
- Reference style: Your Lordship; The Most Reverend
- Spoken style: His Lordship
- Religious style: Bishop

Diamantino Guapo Antunes, I.M.C. (born 30 November 1966) is a Portuguese Catholic prelate who has served as Bishop of Tete in Mozambique since 2019. He is a member of the Consolata Missionaries.

== Background and education ==
He was born on 30 November 1966 at Albergaria dos Doze, Diocese of Leiria, Leiria District, Central Region of Portugal. He studied Philosophy at the Catholic University of Portugal in Lisbon, from 1985 until 1988. He then studied Theology at the Pontifical Urban University in Rome, from 1989 until 1992. He holds a Licentiate in Dogmatic Theology, awarded by the Pontifical Gregorian University, having studied there from 1994 until 1997. He continued his studies at that same university from 1997, graduating in 1999 with a Doctorate in Dogmatic Theology.

== Priest ==
He became a member of the Consolata Missionaries while he was at seminary. He took his perpetual vows on 19 September 1993. He was ordained a deacon at Cuamba, Diocese of Lichinga on 5 December 1993. He was ordained a priest of the Consolata Missionaries on 20 July 1994 at Fatima, Diocese of Leiria-Fátima, Portugal. He served as a priest until 22 March 2019. While a priest, he served in various roles and locations, including as:

- Studies in Rome, leading to the award of a Licentiate in Dogmatic Theology at the Pontifical Gregorian University from 1994 until 1997.
- Studies in Rome, leading to the award of a PhD in the same subject at the same university from 1997 until 1999.
- Local Superior and Parish Priest of the Sagrado Coração de Jesus in Mepenhira in the Diocese of Lichinga, Mozambique from 1999 until 2002.
- Local superior, parish priest of Nossa Senhora da Fátima in Mecanhelas and of Entre Lagos in the Diocese of Lichinga from 2002 until 2005.
- Provincial Councilor in Mozambique from 2005 until 2008.
- Local superior and parish priest of Nova Mambone, in the Diocese of Inhambane from 2005 until 2007.
- Parish priest of Santa Isabel in Guiúa, responsible for the Catechetical Center in the Diocese of Inhambane from 2007 until 2014.
- Episcopal Vicar for the Pastoral Care of the Diocese of Inhambane from 2007 until 2014.
- Regional Superior of the Consolata Missionary Institute in Mozambique and Angola since 2014.
- Superior of the Consolata Missionaries Community in Angola since 2017.
- Postulator of the Cause of Beatification of the Catechist Martyrs of Guiúa, since 2017.

== Bishop ==
On 22 March 2019, Pope Francis appointed Reverend Father Diamantino Guapo Antunes, I.M.C., previously, Regional Superior of the Consolata Missionary Institute in Mozambique and Angola as Bishop of the Diocese of Tete, Mozambique. He was consecrated bishop at Tete on 12 May 2019 by Inácio Saure, Archbishop of Nampula assisted by Claudio Dalla Zuanna, Archbishop of Beira and Lucio Andrice Muandula, Bishop of Xai-Xai. As local ordinary at Tete, he has spearheaded the beautification of two Jesuit priests murdered in October 1985 at Chapotera Mission in Tete Diocese.

== See also ==
- Catholic Church in Mozambique

== Succession table ==
Catholic Church titles
Preceded by Inácio Saure (12 April 2011 - 11 April 2017)	Bishop of Tete (since 22 March 2019)	Succeeded by Incumbent
