= Estêvão Ângelo Fernando =

Mozambican Roman Catholic prelate (born 1974)

The Most Reverend Estêvão Ângelo Fernando
- Bishop of Alto Molócuè, Mozambique
- Church: Catholic Church
- Archdiocese: Roman Catholic Archdiocese of Nampula
- See: Roman Catholic Diocese of Alto Molócuè
- Appointed: 23 January 2025
- Installed: 10 May 2025
- Predecessor: None (Diocese erected)
- Successor: Incumbent

Orders
- Ordination: 24 June 2001
- Consecration: 10 May 2025 by Luís Miguel Muñoz Cárdaba

Personal details
- Born: Estêvão Ângelo Fernando; 17 June 1974 (age 52) Inhassunge, Diocese of Quelimane, Zambezia Province, Mozambique
- Motto: "Ego ero fidens in eum" (I will put my trust in Him)

Styles of Estêvão Ângelo Fernando
- Reference style: His Eminence
- Spoken style: Your Eminence
- Religious style: Monsignor

Estêvão Ângelo Fernando (born 17 June 1974) is a Mozambican prelate of the Catholic Church who is the Bishop of the Roman Catholic Diocese of Alto Molócuè, in Mozambique since 23 January 2025. Before then, from 24 June 2001 until he was appointed bishop, he was a priest of the Roman Catholic Diocese of Quelimane, Mozambique. He was appointed bishop by Pope Francis. He was consecrated bishop on 10 May 2025, at Alto Molócuè.

== Early life and education ==
He was born on 17 June 1974 in Inhassunge, in the Diocese of Quelimane, Zambezia Province, in Mozambique. He studied at the Santo Agostinho Preparatory Seminary of Quelimane. He then studied at the Santo Agostinho Philosophical Seminary of Matola, where he studied philosophy. He studied theology at the Saint Pius X Theological Seminary of Maputo, where he graduated with a Bachelor's degree. He holds a Licentiate in pastoral theology awarded in 2014, by the Theological Faculty of Triveneto in Padua, Italy. His Doctorate in pastoral theology was awarded by the Pontifical Lateran University in Rome.

== Priest ==
He was ordained a priest for the Diocese of Quelimane, Mozambique on 24 June 2001. He served as a priest until 23 January 2025. While a priest, he served in various roles and locations including as:

- Parish vicar and then parish priest of Mocuba from 2001 until 2006.
- Member of the Commission of Southern Africa for Refugees from 2002 until 2006.
- Spiritual director of the Xaverian Apostolic Movement from 2003 until 2010.
- Rector of the Santo Agostinho Preparatory Seminary of Quelimane from 2007 until 2010.
- Chair of the Communication Commission of Quelimane from 2010 until 2011.
- Collaborator in the parish of Santa Maria Maggiore di Cordenons, diocese of Concordia-Pordenone, in Italy from 2011 until 2014.
- Studies in Padua, Italy at the Theological Faculty of Triveneto, leading to the award of a licentiate in pastoral theology in 2014.
- Collaborator in the parish of San Francesco d'Assisi in Pordenone, in the Diocese of Concordia-Pordenone, Italy from 2015 until 2019.
- Formator in the Santo Agostinho Philosophical Seminary of Matola, Mozambique from 2020 until 2021.
- Studies at the Pontifical Lateran University in Rome, leading to the award of a doctorate in pastoral theology in 2021.
- Formator and bursar of the Seminário Filosófico São Carlos Lwanga in Nampula from 2022 until 2023.

== Bishop ==
On 23 January 2025 Pope Francis erected the Roman Catholic Diocese of Alto Molócuè, in Mozambique by taking territory from the Diocese of Quelimane and the Diocese of Gurué. The Holy Father appointed Reverend Father Estêvão Ângelo Fernando of the clergy of Quelimane as the pioneer bishop of the diocese of Alto Molócuè, in Mozambique.

He was consecrated at Alto Molócuè, on 10 May 2025. The Principal Consecrator was Luís Miguel Muñoz Cárdaba, Titular Archbishop of Nasai assisted by Inácio Saure, Archbishop of Nampula and Inácio Lucas Mwita, Bishop of Gurué.

== See also ==
- Catholic Church in Mozambique

== Succession table ==
Catholic Church titles
| Preceded by None (Diocese erected) | Bishop of Alto Molócuè (since 23 January 2025) | Succeeded by Incumbent |
