= Roman Catholic Diocese of Alto Molócuè =

Roman Catholic diocese in Mozambique

Coordinates: 5°39′S 37°42′E

Diocese of Alto Molócuè Dioecesis Molócuè Superioris

Location
- Country: Mozambique
- Metropolitan: Nampula

Statistics
- Area: 28,632 km^{2} (11,055 sq mi)
- Population: Total; Catholics: (as of 2025); 1,199,649; 487,465 (40.6%)

Information
- Rite: Latin Rite

Current leadership
- Pope: Pope Leo XIV
- Bishop: Estêvão Ângelo Fernando

The Roman Catholic Diocese of Alto Molócuè (Latin: Molócuè Superioris) is a diocese located in the city of Alto Molócue, in the Alto Molocue District in the ecclesiastical province of Nampula in Mozambique.

== History ==
- 23 January 2025: Established as Diocese of Alto Molócuè by taking territory from the Diocese of Quelimane and the Diocese of Gurúè. Made a suffragan of the Archdiocese of Nampula.

== Location ==
The diocese covers the districts of Alto Molócuè, Mocubela, Pebane, Gilé, and Mulevala.

== Cathedral ==
The diocesan cathedral is the Cathedral of Our Lady Queen of the World Parish, (Portuguese: Catedral Nossa Senhora Rainha do Mundo), located in Alto Molócuè, in the Zambézia Province of Mozambique.

== Leadership ==
- Bishop Estêvão Ângelo Fernando (since 23 January 2025)

== See also ==
- Roman Catholicism in Mozambique
