= Paulo Mandlate =

Mozambican Roman Catholic bishop (1934–2019)

Paulo Mandlate S.S.S.
- Bishop of Tete
- Church: Catholic Church
- Diocese: Diocese of Tete
- In office: 31 May 1976 – 18 April 2009
- Predecessor: Augusto César Alves Ferreira da Silva
- Successor: Inácio Saure

Orders
- Ordination: 6 January 1968
- Consecration: 26 September 1976 by Jaime Pedro Gonçalves

Personal details
- Born: 4 February 1934 (present-day Gaza Province), Colony of Mozambique, Portuguese Empire
- Died: 21 August 2019 (aged 85) Maputo, Mozambique

Paulo Mandlate S.S.S. (4 February 1934 – 21 August 2019) was a Mozambican prelate of the Catholic Church who served as the Bishop of Tete from 1976 to 2009.

He was born in the Gaza Province on 4 February 1934. Madlate was ordained a priest of the Congregation of the Blessed Sacrament on 6 January 1968. Pope Paul VI named him the Bishop of Tete on 31 May 1976, and he was ordained a bishop on 26 September of that year. He was the first person of black skin color to head that diocese. Mandlate retired as bishop on 18 April 2009.

He died in Maputo on 21 August 2019 at the age of 85.
