= Bernardo Filipe Governo =

Mozambican Capuchin friar and bishop in the Roman Catholic Church

Bernardo Filipe Governo OFMCap
- Bishop of Quelimane
- Church: Catholic Church
- Diocese: Diocese of Quelimane
- In office: 31 May 1976 – 10 March 2007
- Predecessor: Francisco Nunes Teixeira
- Successor: Hilário da Cruz Massinga

Orders
- Ordination: 4 October 1969 by Alessandro Maria Gottardi
- Consecration: 10 October 1976 by Francesco Colasuonno

Personal details
- Born: 20 January 1939 Macuse, Colony of Mozambique, Portuguese Empire
- Died: 20 October 2013 (aged 74)

Bernardo Filipe Governo, OFMCap (20 January 1939 − 20 October 2013) was a Mozambican Capuchin friar and bishop in the Roman Catholic Church.

== Life ==
Bernardo Filipe Governo entered the Order of Friars Minor Capuchin and was ordained a priest on 4 October 1969. Pope Paul VI appointed him Bishop of Quelimane on 31 May 1976. The apostolic delegate in Mozambique, Francesco Colasuonno, consecrated Governo on 10 October of the same year; co-consecrators were Jaime Pedro Gonçalves, Coadjutor Bishop of Beira, and Alberto Setele, Bishop of Inhambane.

On 10 March 2007, Pope Benedict XVI granted his request for resignation for health reasons.
