= Mandlate =

Mandlate is a Bantu-language surname. Notable people with the surname include:

- Paulo Mandlate (1934–2019), Mozambican Roman Catholic bishop
- Fernando Mandlate (b. 1985), Mozambican basketball player
