= António Manuel Bogaio Constantino =

Mozambican Catholic prelate (born 1969)

The Most Reverend António Manuel Bogaio Constantino
- Bishop of the Catholic Diocese of Caia, Mozambique
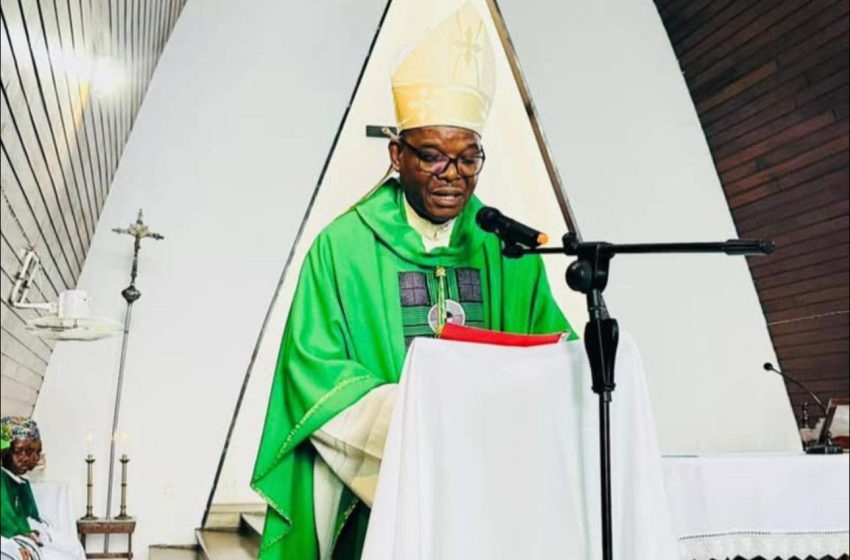
- Bishop António Manuel Bogaio Constantino
- Church: Catholic Church
- Archdiocese: Roman Catholic Archdiocese of Beira
- See: Catolic Diocese of Caia
- Appointed: 23 December 2025
- Installed: 23 December 2025
- Predecessor: None (Diocese created)
- Successor: Incumbent
- Other posts: Auxiliary Bishop of Beira (13 December 2022 - 23 December 2025); Apostolic Administrator of Beira (since 12 June 2026)

Orders
- Ordination: 13 June 2001
- Consecration: 19 February 2023 by Claudio Dalla Zuanna
- Rank: Bishop

Personal details
- Born: António Manuel Bogaio Constantino; 9 November 1969 (age 56) Tete, Diocese of Tete, Tete Province, Mozambique
- Motto: "In Omnia Sapientia Domini" (In all things, Lord, grant me wisdom)

Styles of António Manuel Bogaio Constantino
- Reference style: Your Lordship; The Most Reverend
- Spoken style: His Lordship
- Religious style: Bishop

António Manuel Bogaio Constantino M.C.C.I. (born 9 November 1969), is a Mozambican Catholic prelate who serves as the Bishop of the Catholic Diocese of Caia in Mozambique, since that Catholic See was created on 23 December 2025. Before that, from 13 December 2022 until 23 December 2025, he served as Auxiliary Bishop of the Roman Catholic Archdiocese of Beira, Mozambique. Pope Francis appointed him bishop. The Holy Father assigned him Titular Bishop of Sutunurca. He received his episcopal consecration at Beira on 19 February 2023 by the hands of Claudio Dalla Zuanna, Archbishop of Beira. On 23 December 2025, Pope Leo XIV created the Catholic Diocese of Caia, Mozambique. The Holy Father appointed Bishop António Manuel Bogaio Constantino, previously auxiliary bishop of Beira, as the pioneer local ordinary at Caia. He is a professed member of the Comboni Missionaries of the Heart of Jesus. On 12 June 2026, he was appointed apostolic administrator of the Archdiocese of Beira.

== Early life and education ==
He was born on 9 November 1969. He completed his pre-postulancy with the Comboni Missionaries of the Heart of Jesus in Nampula, Mozambique. He studied at the Santo Agostinho Philosophical Seminary in Matola, Mozambique. He completed his novitiate in Uganda. He graduated with a Bachelor's degree in Theology from the Pontifical Gregorian University in Rome, Italy. He also holds a degree in Journalism and a Licentiate in "Integral Communication", awarded by the Universidad Francisco de Vitoria in Spain.

== Priest ==
He took his preliminary vows as a Comboni Missionary on 10 May 1997 in Kampala, Uganda. On 10 June 2000, he took his perpetual vows in Rome, Italy. He was ordained a priest on 13 June 2001 in Beira, for the Comboni Missionaries. He served as a priest until 23 December 2025. While a priest, he served in many roles and locations, including:

- Studies in Madrid, Spain at the Universidad Francisco de Vitoria, leading to the award of a degree in Journalism and Licentiate in "Integral Communication".
- Director of the Vida Nova Magazine of the Catechetical Center of Anchilo, Mozambique from 2008 until 2011.
- Parish priest of Monapo, Mozambique from 2008 until 2011.
- Parish priest of Chitima and Mucumbura from 2012 until 2016.
- Archpriest of the "Forane Vicariate" of Songo from 2012 until 2016.
- Diocesan Representative for Catechesis of the diocese of Tete, Mozambique from 2012 until 2016.
- Vice Director of the Pastoral Secretariat for the Diocese of Tete, Mozambique from 2012 until 2016.
- Provincial Superior of the Comboni Missionaries in Mozambique from 2017 until 2022.
- President of the Conference of Religious in Mozambique (CIRMO) from 2019 until 2022.

== Bishop ==
On 13 December 2022, Pope Francis appointed him Auxiliary Bishop of the Archdiocese of Beira, Mozambique. He was contemporaneously appointed Titular Bishop of Sutunurca. He was consecrated bishop at Beira on 19 February 2023. The Principal Consecrator was Claudio Dalla Zuanna, Archbishop of Beira who was assisted by Inácio Saure, Archbishop of Nampula and João Carlos Hatoa Nunes, Coadjutor Archbishop of Maputo.

On 23 December 2025, Pope Leo XIV created the Catholic Diocese of Caia, Mozambique and made it a suffragan of the Metropolitan Ecclesiastical Province of Beira. The Holy Father appointed Bishop António Manuel Bogaio Constantino, previously auxiliary bishop of Beira, as the pioneer bishop of the new Catholic See. Bishop Bogaio Constantino was installed at Caia on 25 February 2026. On 6 June 2026, The Holy Father appointed him Apostolic Administrator of the Archdiocese of Beira until a suitable archbishop is appointed.

== See also ==
- Catholic Church in Mozambique

== Succession table ==
Catholic Church titles
Preceded by None (Diocese created)	Catholic Bishop of Caia (since 23 December 2025)	Succeeded by (Incumbent)
Preceded by	Auxiliary Bisop of Beira (13 December 2022 - 23 December 2025)	Succeeded by
