= Cyclone Filao =

South-West Indian cyclone in 1988

Tropical Cyclone Filao
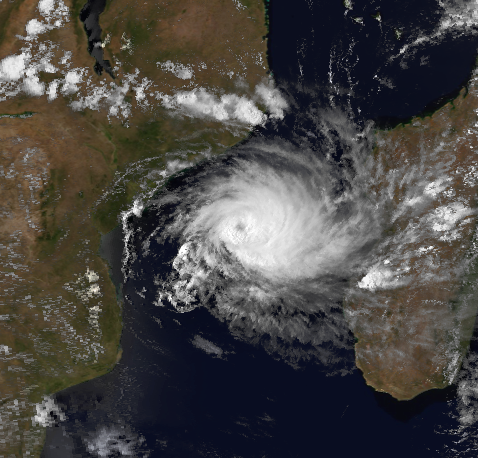
- Cyclone Filao on 29 February

Meteorological history
- Formed: 23 February 1988
- Dissipated: 2 March 1988

Tropical cyclone
- 10-minute sustained (MFR)
- Highest winds: 130 km/h (80 mph)
- Lowest pressure: 954 hPa (mbar); 28.17 inHg

Category 2-equivalent tropical cyclone
- 1-minute sustained (SSHWS/JTWC)
- Highest winds: 155 km/h (100 mph)

Overall effects
- Fatalities: 100
- Damage: $10 million (1988 USD)
- Areas affected: Madagascar, Mozambique
- IBTrACS
- Part of the 1987–88 South-West Indian Ocean cyclone season

Tropical Cyclone Filao was a moderately intense tropical cyclone that caused widespread flooding in Mozambique in 1988. First classified as a tropical depression north of Madagascar, the system moved southwest, crossing the northern part of the nation before entering the Mozambique Channel on 27 February, where it began to deepen. Later that day, the depression was upgraded into a moderate tropical storm. Two days later, Filao attained severe tropical storm intensity as it began to stall. On 1 March, the storm reached cyclone intensity just before turning west. Later that day, Filao attained peak intensity, with winds of 135 km/h (85 mph) and a minimum barometric pressure of 954 mbar (hPa); 28.17 inHg. Within 24 hours, however, the system moved ashore near Quelimane in Central Mozambique, and several hours later, Filao dissipated inland.

Cyclone Filao killed 100 people in Mozambique, primarily in rural areas. Damage was heaviest in Quelimane, where wind gusts reached 105 km/h (65 mph) and rainfall totaled 104 mm (4.1 in). There, 57 people were killed and 7,375 were left homeless. Elsewhere, the Pungwe River and Limpopo River experienced severe flooding, with the former sustaining its worst flood of the decade. Power and telephone services were also knocked out while a road that connected Mozambique to Zimbabwe was destroyed. In all, 5,500 ha (14,000 acres) of crops were destroyed. Damage totaled to $10 million, including $1.5 million in property damage. (Note: All damage totals are in the value of the USD during the storm's year of existence.)

== Meteorological history ==
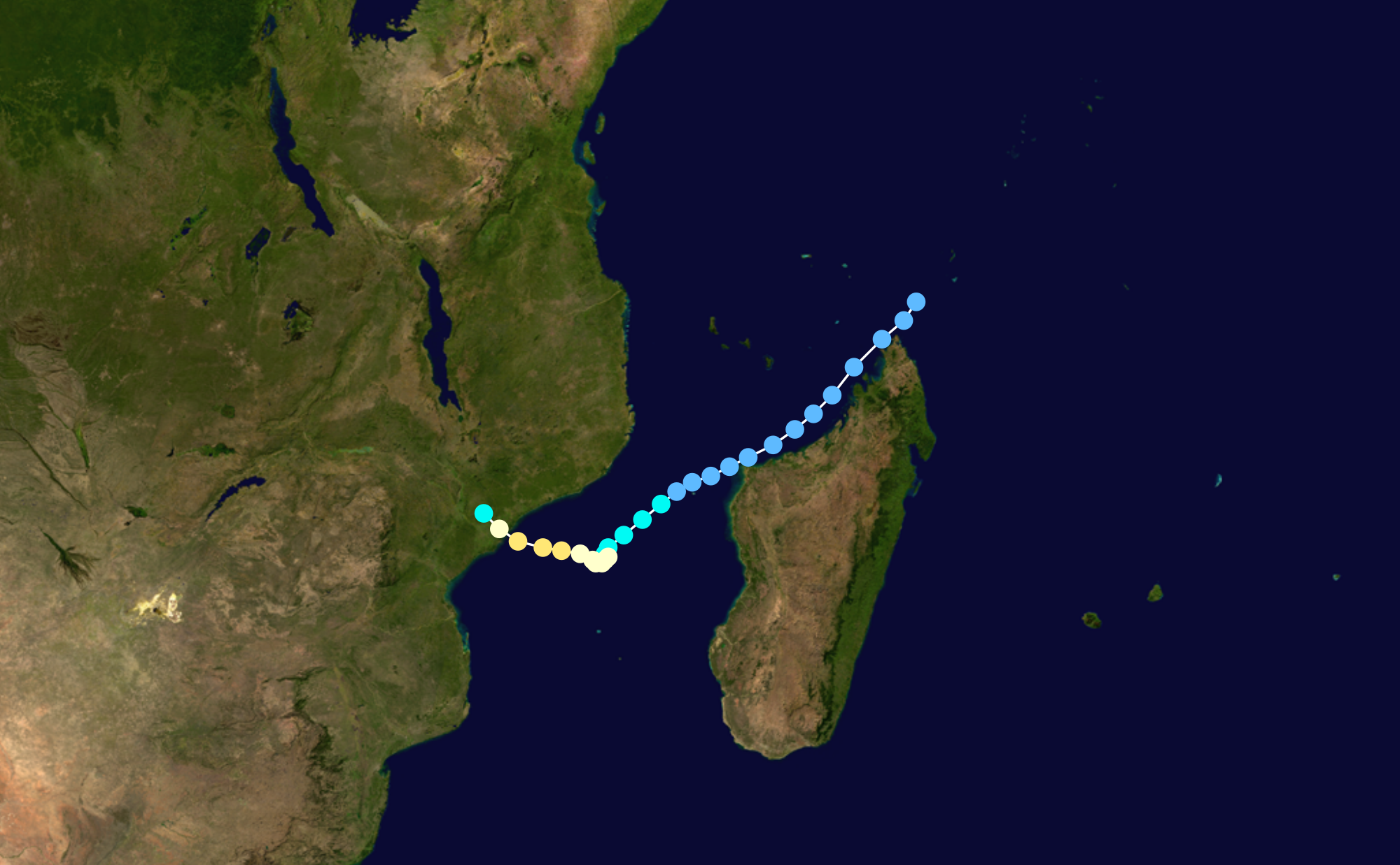
Map plotting the storm's track and intensity, according to the Saffir–Simpson scale Map key Saffir–Simpson scale Tropical depression (≤38 mph, ≤62 km/h) Tropical storm (39–73 mph, 63–118 km/h) Category 1 (74–95 mph, 119–153 km/h) Category 2 (96–110 mph, 154–177 km/h) Category 3 (111–129 mph, 178–208 km/h) Category 4 (130–156 mph, 209–251 km/h) Category 5 (≥157 mph, ≥252 km/h) Unknown Storm type Tropical cyclone Subtropical cyclone Extratropical cyclone, remnant low, tropical disturbance, or monsoon depression

On 23 February, Météo-France's office on the island of Réunion (MFR) started monitoring a tropical depression to the northeast of Madagascar. At this time, the depression developed a closed circulation, which received a rating of T1.5 on the Dvorak Scale, a tool used to estimate a system's intensity. Shortly thereafter, the Joint Typhoon Warning Center (JTWC) first classified the system, designating it as 14S. Following a slight increase in organization, the depression moved southwest (Note: Wind estimates from Météo-France and most other basins throughout the world are sustained over 10 minutes, while estimates from the United States-based Joint Typhoon Warning Center are sustained over 1 minute. 10 minute winds are about 1.14 times the amount of 1 minute winds.) and quickly crossed the tip of northern Madagascar. After weakening over land, the depression reentered the Mozambique channel near Analalava on 25 February. Based on a 3.0 Dvorak classification, MFR upgraded the storm into a moderate tropical storm on 27 February; the JTWC would follow suit later that day.

After reaching the 40th meridian, Filao turned south, which weakened a ridge. The ridge near the system began to re-strengthen, causing Filao to move erratically, first west, and then northwest. The new position of the ridge provided highly favorable conditions aloft, resulting in a period of rapid deepening. By 29 February, MFR upgraded the storm into a severe tropical storm, while the JTWC estimated that Filao attained hurricane-force. Early on 1 March, data from MFR indicated that Filao reached its peak intensity of 85 mph (135 km/h) and its minimum pressure of 954 mbar (hPa); 28.17 inHg, in agreement with T4.5 and T5.0 from the Dvorak Technique. Subsequently, the JTWC reported that Cyclone Filao had attained winds equivalent to Category 2 intensity on the Saffir-Simpson hurricane wind scale, with winds of 155 km/h (96 mph). Despite a decrease in satellite intensity estimates, Filao held on to this intensity until 1800 UTC, when the storm made landfall near Quelimane in Mozambique. Cyclone Filao quickly weakened over land; both agencies suggest that the storm dissipated on 2 March over the Zambeze Valley and embedded into the Intertropical Convergence Zone (ITCZ).

== Preparations and impact ==
Due to the weak nature of the storm while crossing Madagascar, damage was minor. After crossing Juan de Nova Island as a tropical depression on 27 February, winds of 54 km/h (34 mph) and gusts of 87 km/h (54 mph) were reported, along with a minimum barometric pressure of 1,002.3 mbar (29.60 inHg) at 0250 UTC.

Although the cyclone affected a sparsely populated region of Mozambique, Filao brought heavy rains. Peak storm totals included 103.9 mm (4.09 in) in Quelimane and 51.5 mm (2.03 in) in Beira, both far greater than their March average. Winds of 47 mph (76 km/h) and gusts of 67 mph (108 km/h) were measured. Furthermore, a minimum pressure of 993.9 mbar (29.35 inHg) was reported in Quelimane at 23:00 UTC on 1 March.

The Zambezia Province, where Quelimane is located, sustained the worst damage from the cyclone. Throughout Quelimane, 57 fatalities were reported and 800 homes were damaged. Eleven people were wounded, 7,375 persons were rendered homeless, 2,240 buildings were damaged, of which 359 were completely destroyed. Throughout the city, power was knocked out and telephone service was cut.

In the Inhassunge Province, 400 ha (990 acres) of rice were lost and thousands of coconut trees were downed by the storm. Throughout the district, some schools were damaged while 800 homes were destroyed. Within the province of Sofala, 14,395 ha (35,570 acres) of harvest were destroyed, 28,174 people were rendered homeless, and 1,389 buildings were destroyed. Elsewhere, many rivers along the southern and central part of the nation were flooded; consequently; 5,500 ha (13,590 acres) of crops were destroyed. The Pungwe River experienced its worst flood of the 1980s, but the worst flooding took place along the Limpopo River. Near the Pungwe River, a road that connected Mozambique to Zimbabwe was destroyed. Many nearby homes and fields were destroyed, forcing numerous families to seek shelter. Throughout the nation of Mozambique, large portions of the maize, potatoes, tomatoes, cucumber, and pumpkin crops were washed away due to flooding.

Overall, the storm brought considerable damage to the nation; it was also the first storm to affect the nation since Tropical Storm Domoina in 1984. Damage totaled to $10 million (1988 USD). Property damage alone totaled to $1.5 million, just under $1 million of which came from buildings. Moreover, insured losses from the storm totaled $1 million. Even though the death toll was initially believed to be 57; by 14 March, this number had increased to the final death toll of 100 after additional information was received from remote areas of the country. About 90,000 people were directly affected by the system.

== See also ==
- South-West Indian Ocean tropical cyclone season
- Cyclone Nadia (1994)
- Tropical Storm Lisette (1997)
- Cyclone Japhet (2003)
