= Our Lady of the Rosary Cathedral, Beira =

Our Lady of the Rosary Cathedral
- Catedral Metropolitana de Nossa Senhora do Rosário
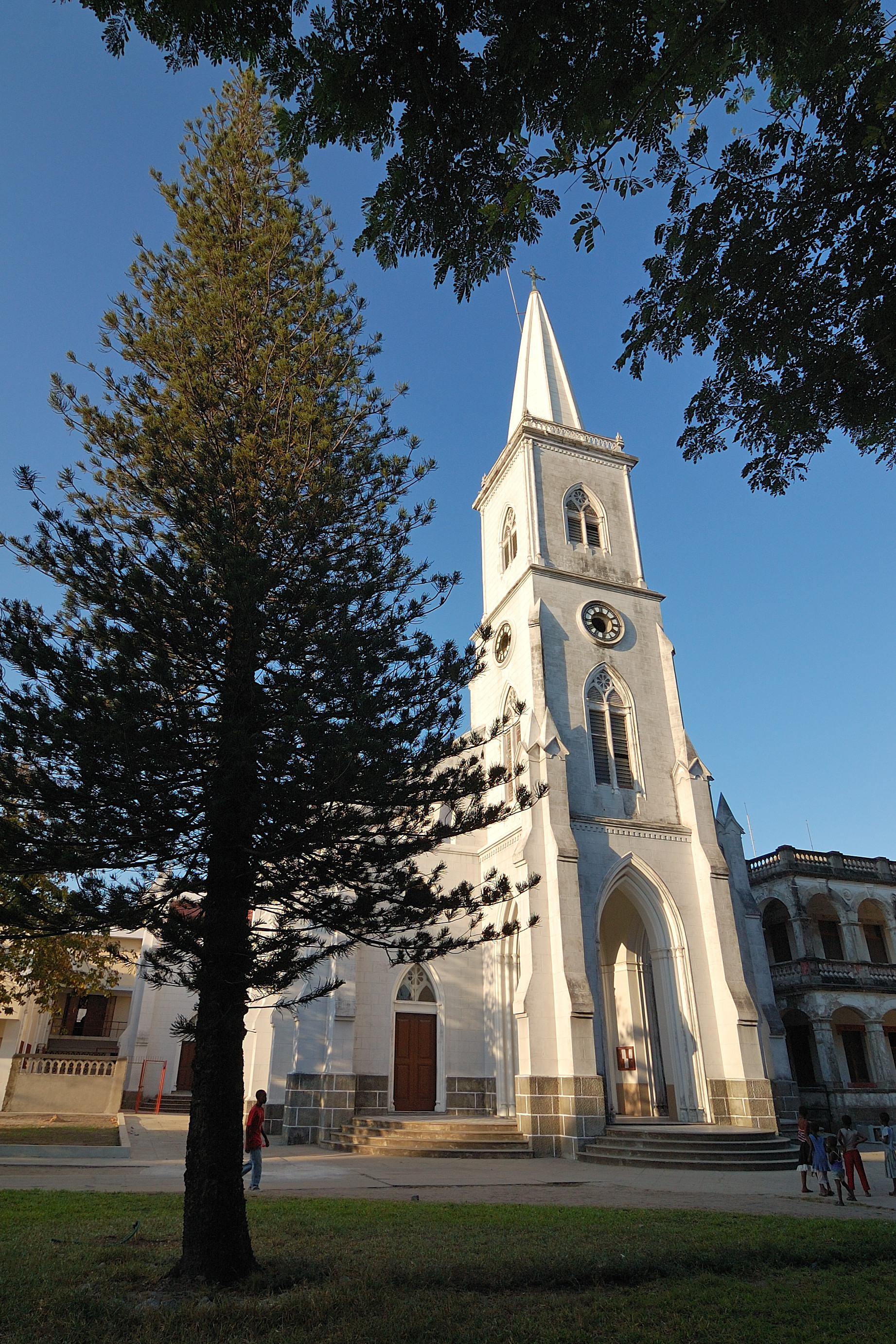
- Our Lady of the Rosary Cathedral
- 19.8395°S 34.8421°E
- Location: Beira
- Country: Mozambique
- Denomination: Roman Catholic Church

Clergy
- Archbishop: Claudio Dalla Zuanna

The Our Lady of the Rosary Cathedral (Portuguese: Catedral Metropolitana de Nossa Senhora do Rosário) also called Metropolitan Cathedral of Our Lady of the Rosary, is located in Beira, a town in the African country of Mozambique and is the cathedral of the Archdiocese of Beira.

The first stone church was laid on 25 October 1900 at the site where the first cemetery of Beira. The foundation stones of the nave and the altar were removed from the fort of Sao Caetano of Sofala. The church, built in the Gothic Revival style, was inaugurated in 1925. The church dates back to the beginning of the city, which explains its modest size. He was elevated to the cathedral since the founding of the diocese in 1940.

In March 2019 the cathedral was heavily damaged by cyclone Idai.

== See also ==
- Roman Catholic Archdiocese of Beira
- Roman Catholicism in Mozambique
