= Augusto César Alves Ferreira da Silva =

Portuguese Roman Catholic bishop (born 1932)

His Excellency Augusto César Alves Ferreira da Silva C.M.
- Bishop Emeritus of Portalegre–Castelo Branco
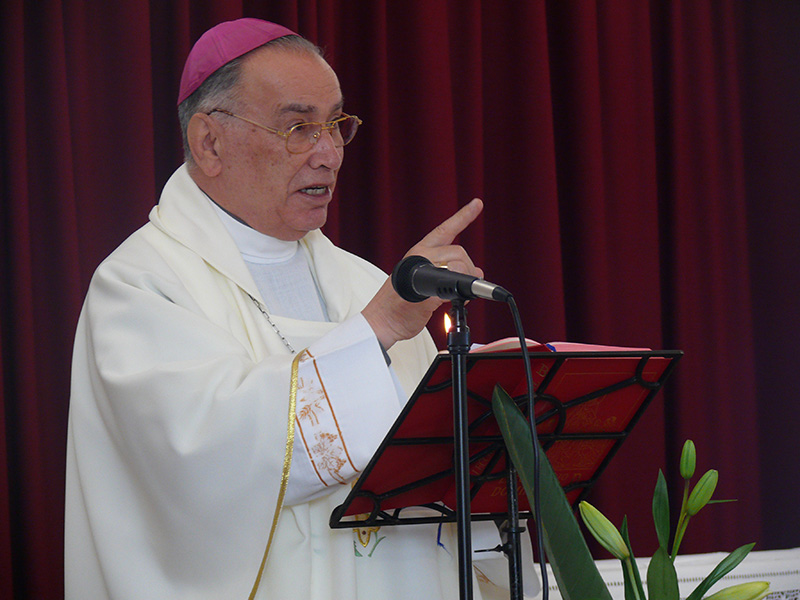
- Church: Catholic Church
- Diocese: Diocese of Portalegre-Castelo Branco
- Appointed: 25 September 1978
- Installed: 26 November 1978
- Term ended: 22 April 2004
- Predecessor: Agostinho Joaquim Lopes de Moura
- Successor: José Francisco Sanches Alves
- Other post: Bishop of Tete (1972–1976)

Orders
- Ordination: 24 July 1960
- Consecration: 21 May 1972 by António Ribeiro

Personal details
- Born: 15 March 1932 (age 94) Fervença, Celorico de Basto, Portugal
- Denomination: Roman Catholic
- Motto: Caritas urget

Augusto César Alves Ferreira da Silva, C.M. (born 15 March 1932) is a Portuguese Roman Catholic prelate, who served as bishop of the Diocese of Portalegre-Castelo Branco from 1978 to 2004. He previously served as bishop of the Roman Catholic Diocese of Tete in Mozambique from 1972 to 1976.

== Early life and priesthood ==
Ferreira da Silva was born on 15 March 1932 in Fervença, in the municipality of Celorico de Basto, Portugal. He entered the seminary of the Congregation of the Mission (Vincentians) in 1946 in Felgueiras. After completing a novitiate in Santander, Spain, he continued his philosophical and theological studies at the Major Seminary of Santa Teresinha.

He was ordained a priest on 24 July 1960 for the Congregation of the Mission. Shortly afterwards he was sent as a missionary to Mozambique, where he worked in priestly formation and served in several seminaries. He became rector of the Bom Pastor Seminary in the Diocese of Quelimane and later of the interdiocesan major seminary Cristo Rei in Lourenço Marques (now Maputo).

In 1970 he was appointed provincial superior of the Vincentian congregation in Portugal and president of the governing council of the Instituto Superior de Teologia de Évora.

== Episcopal ministry ==
On 19 February 1972, Pope Paul VI appointed Ferreira da Silva bishop of the Diocese of Tete in Mozambique. He received episcopal consecration on 21 May 1972 from Cardinal António Ribeiro, Patriarch of Lisbon, with Archbishop António de Castro Xavier Monteiro and Archbishop Manuel Maria Ferreira da Silva as co-consecrators.

He served as bishop of Tete during the final years of Portuguese Mozambique and the period of decolonization. In 1976 he resigned from the diocese, believing that the appointment of a Mozambican bishop would better suit the new circumstances following independence.

On 25 September 1978, Pope John Paul I appointed him bishop of the Diocese of Portalegre-Castelo Branco in Portugal. He took possession of the diocese on 26 November 1978.

During his episcopate he promoted pastoral renewal and evangelization throughout the diocese, visiting parishes regularly and encouraging the formation of clergy and lay faithful. He also reorganized the diocesan pastoral structure by establishing several pastoral zones and missionary initiatives.

Within the Portuguese Episcopal Conference, Ferreira da Silva served as president of the Episcopal Commission for the Clergy, Seminaries and Vocations and was a member of the permanent council. In 1990 he participated in the Synod of Bishops as a delegate of the Portuguese episcopate.

On 22 April 2004, Pope John Paul II accepted his resignation as bishop of Portalegre–Castelo Branco upon reaching the canonical retirement age.

== Later life ==
After retiring, Ferreira da Silva lived in Fátima. He has remained active in pastoral reflection and public commentary, including on social issues and the mission of the Church.
