= Diocese of Portalegre-Castelo Branco =

Roman Catholic diocese in Portugal

Diocese of Portalegre-Castelo Branco Dioecesis Portalegrensis-Castri Albi Diocese de Portalegre-Castelo Branco

Catholic
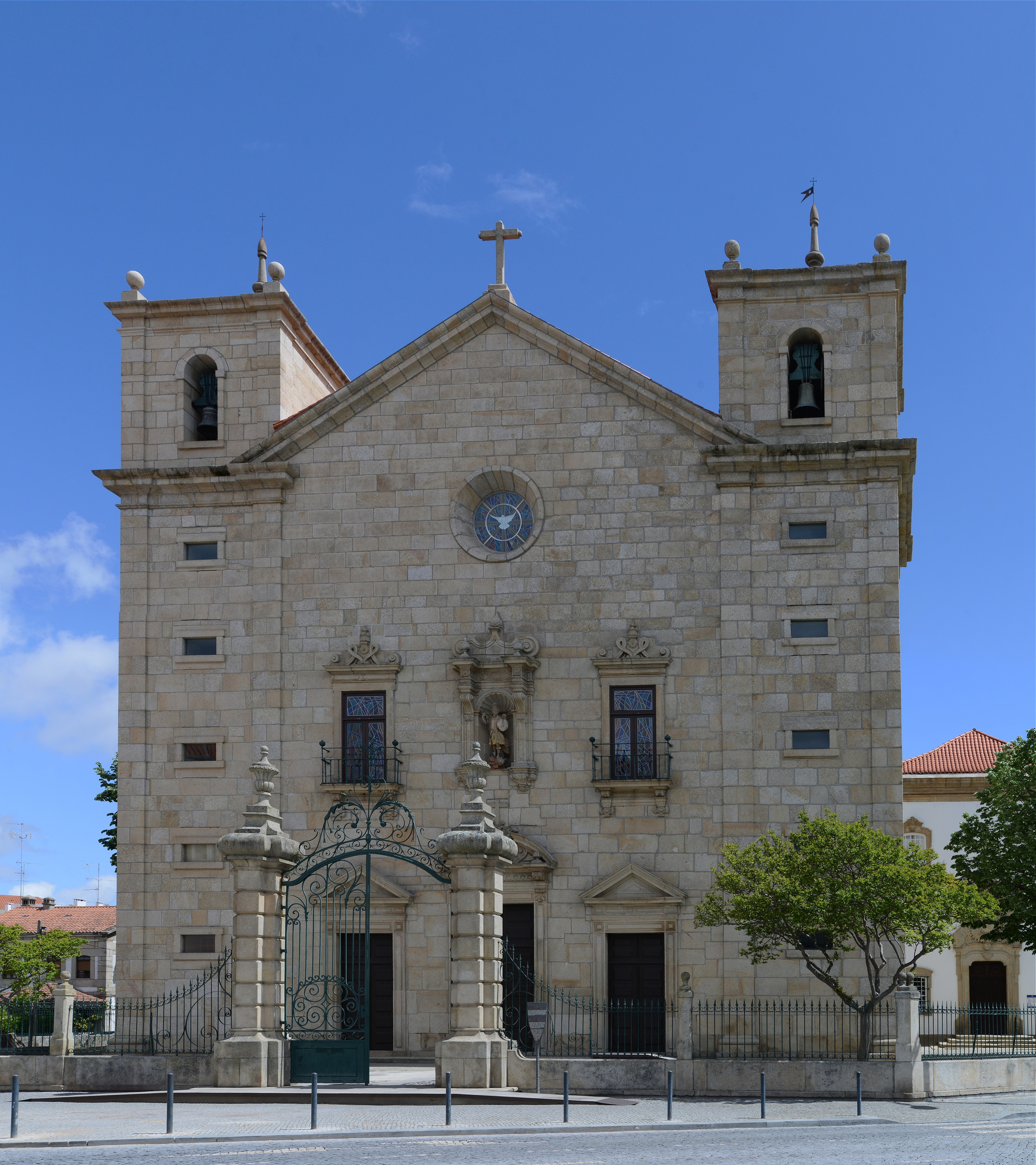
- Co-Cathedral of St Michael in Castelo Branco

Location
- Country: Portugal
- Ecclesiastical province: Lisbon
- Metropolitan: Patriarchate of Lisbon

Statistics
- Area: 9,150 km^{2} (3,530 sq mi)
- Population: Total; Catholics: (as of 2004); 250,541; 248,923 (99.4%)

Information
- Denomination: Roman Catholic
- Sui iuris church: Latin Church
- Rite: Roman Rite
- Established: 2 April 1550 (As Diocese of Portalegre); 18 July 1956 (As Diocese of Portalegre-Castelo Branco)
- Cathedral: Cathedral of Our Lady of the Assumption in Portalegre
- Co-cathedral: Cathedral of St Michael in Cathedral of Castelo Branco
- Patron saint: St Augustine of Hippo

Current leadership
- Pope: Leo XIV
- Bishop: Antonino Eugénio Fernandes Dias
- Metropolitan Archbishop: Manuel III
- Bishops emeritus: Augusto César Alves Ferreira da Silva Bishop Emeritus (1978-2004)

Map

Website
- Website of the Diocese

The Diocese of Portalegre–Castelo Branco (Latin: Dioecesis Portalegrensis–Castri Albi) is a Latin Church diocese of the Catholic church in Portugal. It has carried this name since 1956, when the historical diocese of Portalegre was renamed. It is a suffragan of the archdiocese of Lisbon.

== History ==
Portalegre was established as a see by Pope Julius III, in 1550, taking territory from the archdiocese of Évora and diocese of Guarda. Its first bishop was Julian d'Alva, a Spaniard, who was transferred to the diocese of Miranda in 1557. On 17 July 1560, Andiz' de Noronha succeeded to the diocese, but he was promoted to the diocese of Placencia in 1581. Frei Amador Arraes, the next bishop, was a Carmelite and the author of a celebrated book of Dialogues; he resigned in 1582, and retired to the college of his order in Coimbra, where he remained till his death. Lopo Soares de Albergaria and Frei Manoel de Gouveia died before receiving the Bulls confirming their nomination.

Diego Conra, nephew of the Venerable Bartholomew of the Martyrs and Bishop of Ceuta, became bishop in 1598, and died on 9 October 1614. Among the bishops of Portalegre during the seventeenth century was Ricardo Russell, an Englishman, who took possession of the see on 17 September 1671, and was subsequently transferred to the diocese of Vizeu.

In 1881 the territory of the Diocese of Castelo Branco and Diocese of Elvas was added, when these were suppressed. Antonio Mutinho was transferred from the diocese of Caboverde in 1909.

== Ordinaries ==
=== Diocese of Portalegre ===
Erected: April 2, 1550

- Julião de Alva (21 Aug 1549 – 5 Apr 1560 Appointed, Bishop of Miranda (do Douro))
- Andrés de Noronha (5 Apr 1560 – 11 Sep 1581 Appointed, Bishop of Plasencia)
- Amator Arais de Mendoza, O. Carm. (30 Oct 1581 – 1598 Resigned)
- Diego Corrêa de Souza (16 Feb 1598 – 19 Oct 1614 Died)
- Rodrigo da Cunha (6 Jul 1615 Confirmed – 12 Nov 1618 Appointed, Bishop of Porto)
- Lopo de Sequeira Pereira (22 Apr 1619 – 7 Jun 1632 Appointed, Bishop of Guarda)
- João Mendes de Távora (5 Jul 1632 – 22 Mar 1638 Appointed, Bishop of Coimbra)
- Richard Russell (bishop) (1 Jul 1671 – 10 Sep 1685 Appointed, Bishop of Viseu)
- João de Mascarenhas (1 Apr 1686 – 24 Mar 1692 Appointed, Bishop of Guarda)
- António de Saldanha (bishop) (24 Aug 1693 – 22 Mar 1706 Appointed, Bishop of Guarda)
- Domingos Barata, O.SS.T. (1 Aug 1707 – 25 Apr 1709 Died)
- Álvaro Pires de Castro e Noronha (26 Jan 1711 – 29 Mar 1737 Died)
- Manuel Lopes Simões (19 Dec 1740 – 15 May 1748 Died)
- João de Azevedo (15 Jul 1748 – 11 Nov 1765 Died)
- Jerónimo Rogado do Carvalhal e Silva (6 Aug 1770 – 8 Mar 1773 Confirmed, Bishop of Guarda)
- Pedro de Melo e Brito da Silveira Alvim (12 Jul 1773 – 22 Nov 1777 Died)
- Manuel Tavares Coutinho da Silva (20 Jul 1778 – 7 Apr 1798 Died)
- José Valério da Cruz, C.O. (13 Jun 1798 – 17 Jul 1826 Died)
- José Francisco da Soledade Bravo (24 Feb 1832 – 10 Nov 1833 Died)
- José Maria da Silva Ferrão de Carvalho Mártens (9 Aug 1883 – 20 Nov 1884 Died)
- Manuel Bernardo da Souza Ennes (30 Jul 1885 – 8 Sep 1887 Died)
- Gaudêncio José Pereira (1 Jun 1888 – 2 Nov 1908 Died)
- António Moutinho (29 Apr 1909 – 18 May 1915 Died)
- Manuel Mendes da Conceição Santos (9 Dec 1915 – 4 Jun 1920 Appointed, Coadjutor Archbishop of Évora)
- Manuel Domingos Maria Rosa Fructuoso, O.P. (7 Dec 1920 – 6 Jul 1949 Died)
- António Ferreira Gomes (6 Jul 1949 – 13 Jul 1952 Appointed, Bishop of Porto)
- Agostinho Joaquim Lopes de Moura, C.S.Sp. (27 Dec 1952 – 25 Sep 1978 Resigned)

=== Diocese of Portalegre-Castelo Branco ===
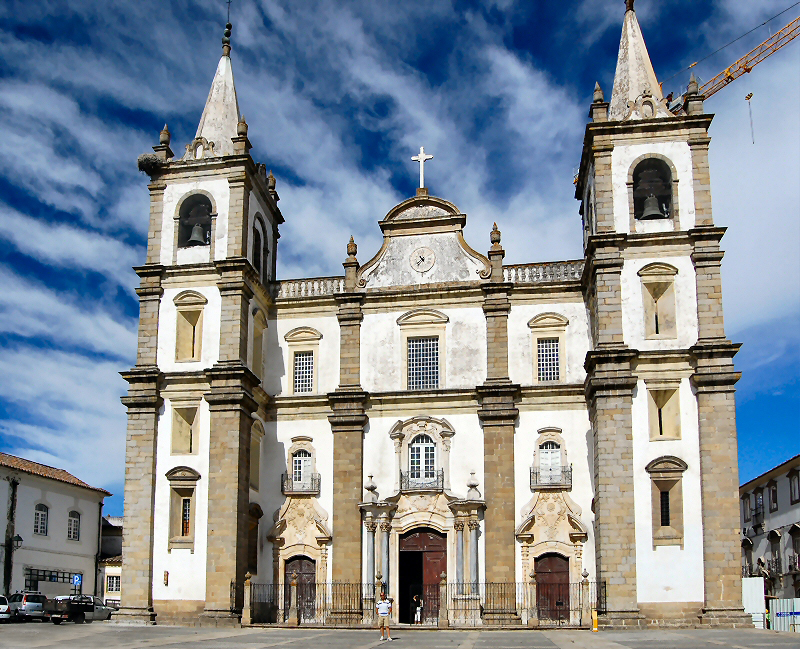
Portalegre Cathedral

Name Changed: July 18, 1956

- Agostinho Joaquim Lopes de Moura, C.S.Sp.
- Augusto César Alves Ferreira da Silva, C.M. (25 Sep 1978 – 22 Apr 2004 Resigned)
- José Francisco Sanches Alves (22 Apr 2004 – 8 Jan 2008 Appointed, Archbishop of Évora)
- Antonino Eugénio Fernandes Dias (8 Sep 2008 Appointed – )
