= Our Lady of the Immaculate Conception Cathedral, Inhambane =

Our Lady of the Immaculate Conception Cathedral
- Catedral da Nossa Senhora da Conceição
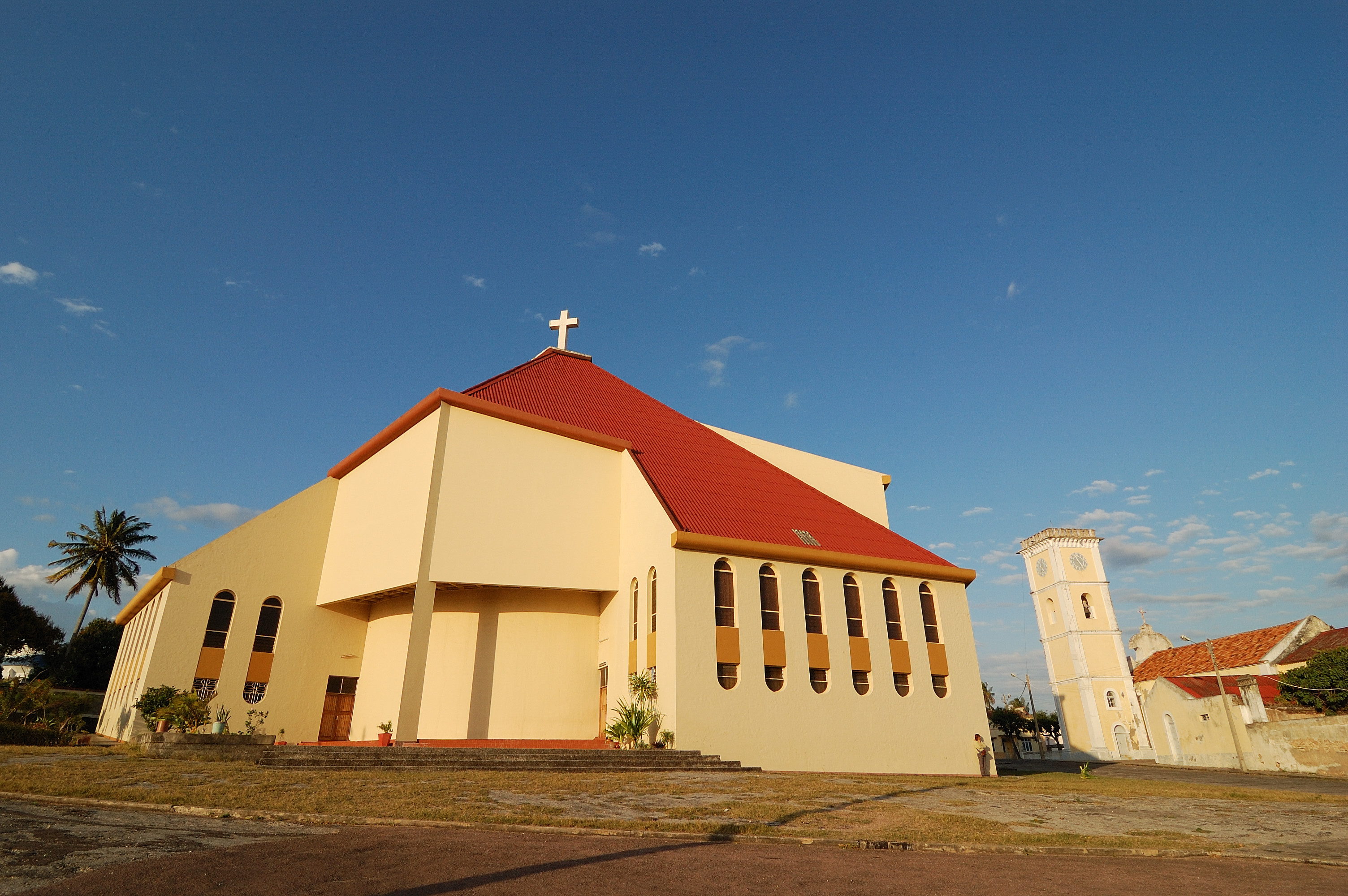
- Our Lady of the Immaculate Conception Cathedral
- 23.8655°S 35.3803°E
- Location: Inhambane
- Country: Mozambique
- Denomination: Roman Catholic Church

The Our Lady of the Immaculate Conception Cathedral (Portuguese: Catedral da Nossa Senhora da Conceição ) also called Inhambane Cathedral is the name that receives a religious building affiliated to the Catholic Church that is located in the city of Inhambane In the province of the same name to the south of the African country of Mozambique. The current structure dates from 1974 and replaces the old cathedral of Inhambane that has a strong Portuguese influence and now has the condition of parochial church.

The cathedral follows the Roman or Latin rite and is the main or mother church of the Diocese of Inhambane (Dioecesis Inhambanianus) that was created in 1962 through the bull "Supremi muneris" of Pope John XXIII.

It is under the pastoral responsibility of Bishop Adriano Langa.

== See also ==
- Roman Catholicism in Mozambique
- List of cathedrals in Mozambique
- Maputo Cathedral
