= Cathedral of Castelo Branco =

Co-cathedral in Castelo Branco, Portugal

Coordinates: 39°49′36″N 7°29′28″W

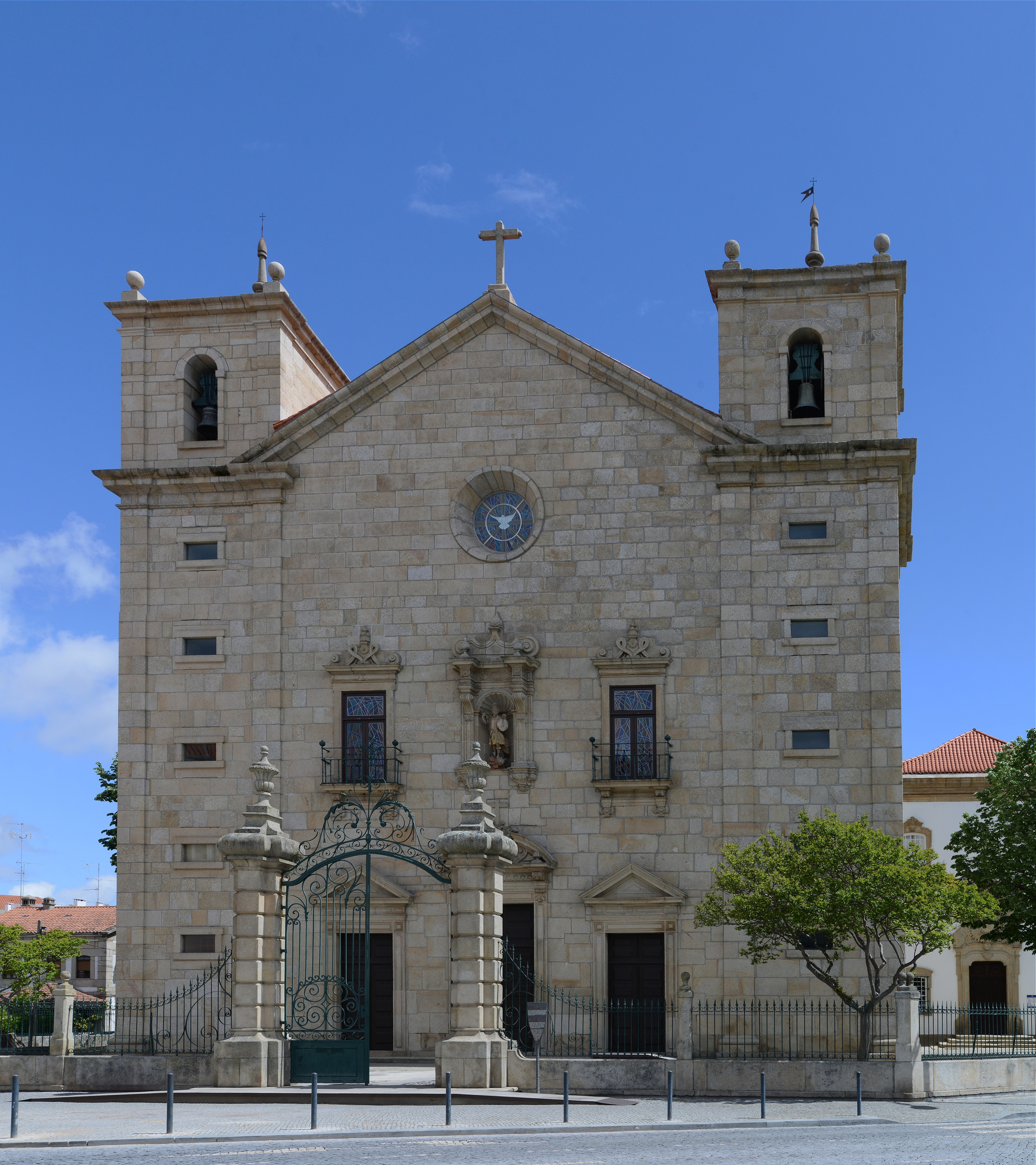

The (Co-)Cathedral of Castelo Branco or Church of Saint Michael (archangel) (Portuguese: Sé de Castelo Branco, Igreja de São Miguel) is a Roman Catholic Latin Co-cathedral and former cathedral in Castelo Branco, Portugal.

It is the second official seat of the Catholic Diocese of Portalegre-Castelo Branco, as the bishopric's two-part title suggests, ranking after the Cathedral of Portalegre.

== History ==
Much of the cathedral was built in the style of the Renaissance, in the 17th century. It lost its status as a cathedral in 1881 when the Diocese of Castelo Branco (founded 1771) was absorbed by the then Diocese of Portalegre (which also adopted its title). It was restored as co-cathedral in 1956.

Since 12 September 1978, it is protected as one of the National monuments of Portugal.

== Sources and external links ==
- GCatholic with Google satellite map
