= 1997 Mozambique floods =

Floods caused by tropical cyclogenesis

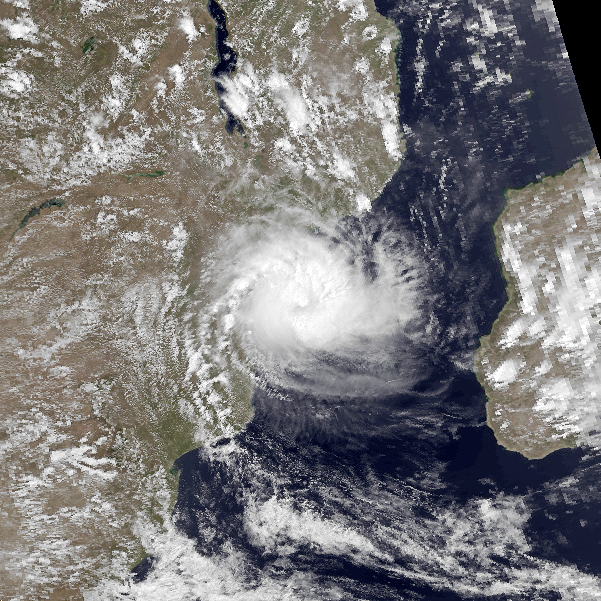
- Tropical Storm Lisette on March 1
- Date: February-March 1997
- Location: Southern Mozambique
- Deaths: 87

Throughout the month of February 1997, as a consequence of an active Intertropical Convergence Zone (ITCZ) tropical cyclogenesis was quite common over the southern Indian Ocean, and especially the Mozambique Channel. Two storms in particular, Cyclone Josie and Tropical Storm Lisette formed in the Channel and inundated much of Mozambique.

Affecting a country already inundated by Cyclone Josie earlier in the year, Lisette brought additional flooding to the nation. The Nampula Province in Mozambique was severely damaged by the storm, where many roads were damaged. Effects from the system spread as far north as northern Mozambique. Overall, 87 people died while 80,000 others were directly affected.

== Meteorological history ==
In late January into February 1997, the ITCZ produced areas of convection around the northern tip of Madagascar. One such convective system from spawned a low pressure area between Tromelin island and Agaléga, which initially was still located within the ITCZ. On February 5, the Météo-France office on Réunion (MFR) reported that system developed into a tropical depression, and failed to intensify further while executing a clockwise loop off northeastern Madagascar. After the convection increased, both MFR and the Joint Typhoon Warning Center (JTWC) estimate that the depression intensified into a tropical storm on February 8 and was named Josie by the Meteorological Services of Madagascar. Subsequently, the storm moved across northern Madagascar and emerged into the Mozambique Channel on February 9 as a tropical depression, its structure deteriorated. Josie turned to the southwest around western Madagascar, and despite warm waters it initially failed to re-intensify much. On February 11, MFR estimated that Josie re-attained tropical storm status, and subsequently turned to the south due to a broad area of low pressure in the region. Data from MFR suggested that the storm quickly intensified once moving far enough away from Madagascar, becoming a tropical cyclone on February 13 and soon after reaching peak 10–winds of 140 km/h (85 mph); in contrast, the JTWC estimated peak winds of 165 km/h (105 mph). (Note: Wind estimates from Météo-France and most other basins throughout the world are sustained over 10 minutes, while estimates from the United States-based Joint Typhoon Warning Center are sustained over 1 minute. 10 minute winds are about 1.14 times the amount of 1 minute winds used by the JTWC.) While near peak intensity, the eyewall of Josie passed over Europa Island. An approaching cold front turned the cyclone to the southeast, bringing the storm over cooler waters and causing weakening due to increased wind shear. On February 16, Josie became extratropical well to the south of Madagascar, and dissipated the next day.

On February 24, following decreased pressures across the northern Mozambique channel after Josie's demise, the ITCZ spawned a tropical wave. An atmospheric circulation began to subsequently develop along the wave axis as it was centered just offshore the Mozambique coast. Situated in an environment with warm sea surface temperatures, the system was first classified by MFR late on February 24, though the JTWC did not start watching the system until the next day, when it was located slightly onshore Mozambique. The following day, MFR upgraded the system into a tropical depression while located within 100 km (60 mi) of the coast of Mozambique. The system slowly became better organized as the storm drifting generally south and on the evening of February 27, the storm developed a central dense overcast, a large mass of deep convection, and was thus upgraded into a moderate tropical storm while located halfway between Mozambique and Madagascar. By this time, intensity estimates from the JTWC indicated that the storm had attained hurricane-equivalent status.

Following the movement of a trough, Lisette abruptly turned west, though the storm's motion remained slow. Meanwhile, Lisette began to deepen, and by that evening, the storm began to develop an eye. Based on this, MFR upgraded the storm into a severe tropical storm. At this time, the storm attained its peak intensity of 95 km/h (60 mph), although JTWC data indicates that Cyclone Lisette was significantly stronger, with winds of 130 km/h (80 mph), making Lisette a moderate Category 1 hurricane on the Saffir-Simpson Hurricane Wind Scale. However, early on March 1, the storm leveled off in intensity for no known reason, though it has been theorized that this was due to an increase wind shear. After maintaining its intensity for a day, it began to approach the coast of Mozambique and thus began to show hints of additional development due a sudden decrease in shear. According to the JTWC, the storm peaked in intensity with winds of 140 km/h (85 mph). However, MFR suggests that the storm did not intensify prior to landfall on March 1. Although the JTWC stopped monitoring the system the subsequent day, MFR tracked this system until March 3, when it was located over Zimbabwe, ending the above-average season.

== Impact and aftermath ==
Facing a region already inundated by Cyclone Josie less than a month prior, Lisette was also the fourth tropical cyclone observed in the Mozambique Channel that season, thought it was the only storm of the year to strike Mozambique. Tropical Storm Lisette brought additional flooding to the nation. Most of the south-central Mozambique was drenched with rainfall totals ranging from 60 mm (2.4 in) to 200 mm (7.9 in), setting numerous records. Due to the precursor disturbance of Lisette, the Nampula Province in Mozambique was severely flooded by the storm, severely damaging several roads, though two of the roads were eventually repaired. The Sofala and Inhambane Provinces were also badly affected by the system; widespread flooding spread as far north as northern Mozambique.

Due to the storm, many sooty terns (Onychoprion fuscatus) were swept inland from the coast for only the second time in recorded history. Overall, 87 people perished in the cyclone while 80,000 others were directly affected. Several years after the passage of the system, an appeal was launched for money from the Government of South Africa, asking them to pay for the damaged roads, but because the road was built by a private company, the appeal was denied.

== See also ==
- Cyclone Filao
- Cyclone Favio
