= Manuel de Araújo =

Mozambican politician (born 1970)

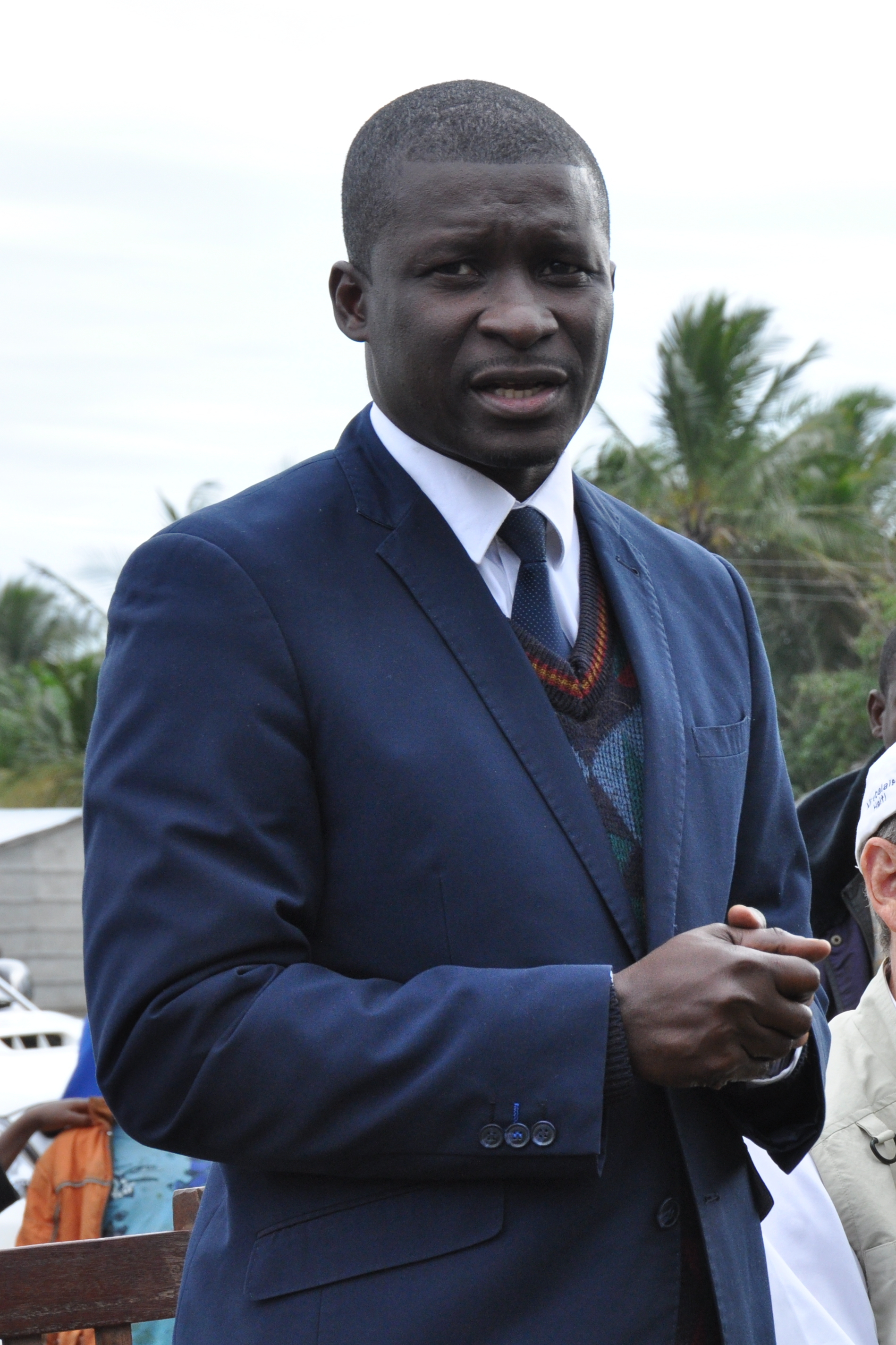

Mayor of Quelimane
- Incumbent
- Assumed office 2011

Member of the Assembly of the Republic
- In office 2004–2009
- Constituency: Zambezia Province

Personal details
- Born: 11 October 1970 (age 55)
- Party: RENAMO (?–2009, 2018-present)
- Other political affiliations: Democratic Movement of Mozambique (2011–2018)

Manuel A. Alculete Lopes de Araújo (born 11 October 1970) is a Mozambican politician who has been Mayor of Quelimane since December 2011.

In 2011, de Araújo ran as the RENAMO candidate in municipal elections in Quelimane, defeating the FRELIMO candidate with 62.27% of the vote. In a subsequent election in 2013, the FRELIMO candidate was named as the winner; however, after allegations of voter fraud were raised, an investigation subsequently determined that de Araújo had won the election wad remained the Mayor of Quelimane.

During the 2023 municipal elections, de Araújo was arbitrarily detained by police officers after visiting polling stations, with the police accusing him of "disturbing" the vote-counting process. He was released a few hours later without charge.
