= Sebastião Soares de Resende =

Portuguese Catholic bishop

Sebastião Soares de Resende (1906–1967) was a Portuguese Catholic bishop in Africa at the head of the diocese of Beira in Mozambique. He was the most liberal of the first generation of bishops after the 1940 Concordat. He is famous for having openly criticised, in the name of the social doctrine of the church, both forced labour and forced cultivation in Mozambique. In the 1960s he leaned towards the idea that Mozambique should become independent.

== Biography ==
Sebastião Soares de Resende was born in 1906 in Milheirós de Poiares, in Northern Portugal. He entered Vilar Seminary in 1923 and the Major Seminary of Porto in 1926. He was ordained in 1928, after which he went to Rome at the Gregorian University where did a doctorate in Philosophy.

After being a professor and later the vice-rector of the Major Seminary of Porto, Sebastião Soares de Resende was nominated in early 1943 as the bishop of the recently created diocese of Beira, Mozambique. He entered the diocese in December 1943 and stayed there until his death in 1967.

The Bishop led a massive expansion of the Catholic church in Beira. Aside from numerous missions and schools (paid for by the Portuguese state who had outsourced education for Africans to the Catholic church), Dom Sebastião created a newspaper, the Diário de Moçambique.

From 1943, Dom Sebastião wrote yearly pastoral letters which gained much readership and influence. His pastoral letters of 1948 and 1949, entitled Ordem comunista e Ordem anticomunista, exposed the social doctrine of the Church and on that basis criticised forced labour and forced cultivation in Mozambique.

Because of his public criticism, Dom Sebastião got into trouble with the colonial authorities several times. His pastoral letter was prevented from circulating in 1949 and his newspaper was suspended several times in the 1960s because of its critical stance in relation to colonialism.

Dom Sebastião led and managed his diocese very successfully, even after the start of the liberation war in 1964 deeply divided his diverse clergy - White Fathers, Franciscans, Burgos fathers, etc. After his death in 1967, the diocese entered a period of turmoil as Dom Sebastião's successors failed to repeat his even hand.

Dom Sebastião is fondly remembered in Beira, and Mozambique more generally, to this very day. His grave in Beira city is the site of celebration every year on the date of his death.

== Sources ==
- José Capela, "Para a história do Diário de Moçambique", Arquivo. Boletim do Arquivo Histórico de Moçambique (Maputo, Mozambique), nº 6 (1989), pp. 177–180
- C. A. Moreira Azevedo, "Perfil biográfico de D. Sebastião Soares de Resende", Lusitania Sacra (Lisbon), 2a série, tomo 6, 1994
- Eric Morier-Genoud "Soares de Resende, Sebastião", Dictionary of African Biography (Oxford: OUP, 2011)
- Eric Morier-Genoud, The Catholic Church, religious orders and the making of politics in colonial Mozambique: The case of the diocese of Beira 1940-1974, Ph.D. dissertation, State University of New York at Binghamton, 2006
- G. Tajú, "D. Sebastião Soares de Resende, primeiro Bispo da Beira: notas para uma cronologia", Arquivo. Boletim do Arquivo Histórico de Moçambique (Maputo, Mozambique), n°6, 1989
- S. Soares de Resende, Profeta em Moçambique, Linda-a-Velha : DIFEL, 1994 [all of the bishop's pastora letters]
