= Roman Catholic Diocese of Tete =

Roman Catholic diocese in Mozambique

Diocese of Tete Dioecesis Tetiensis

Location
- Country: Mozambique
- Metropolitan: Beira

Statistics
- Area: 100,715 km^{2} (38,886 sq mi)
- Population: Total; Catholics: (as of 2004); 1,210,000; 245,000 (20.2%)

Information
- Rite: Latin Rite
- Cathedral: Cathedral of St. James the Major

Current leadership
- Pope: Leo XIV
- Bishop: Diamantino Guapo Antunes, I.M.C.

The Roman Catholic Diocese of Tete (Latin: Tetien(sis) is a diocese located in the city of Tete in the ecclesiastical province of Beira in Mozambique.

== History ==
- May 6, 1962: Established as Diocese of Tete from the Diocese of Beira

== Leadership ==
- Bishops of Tete (Roman rite)
  - Bishop Félix Niza Ribeiro (20 December 1962 – 19 February 1972), appointed Bishop of João Belo
  - Bishop Augusto César Alves Ferreira da Silva, C.M. (19 February 1972 – 31 May 1976)
  - Bishop Paulo Mandlate, S.S.S. (31 May 1976 — 18 April 2009)
  - Bishop Inácio Saure, I.M.C. (12 April 2011 — 11 April 2017), appointed Archbishop of Nampula
  - Bishop Diamantino Guapo Antunes, I.M.C. (since 22 Mar 2019)

== See also ==
- Roman Catholicism in Mozambique

== Sources ==
- GCatholic.org
- Catholic Hierarchy
