= Francisco Nunes Teixeira =

Portuguese-born Mozambican Roman Catholic bishop

- Bishop of Quelimane
- Church: Catholic Church
- Diocese: Diocese of Quelimane
- In office: 6 February 1955 – 23 December 1975
- Predecessor: Diocese erected
- Successor: Bernardo Filipe Governo

Orders
- Ordination: 6 August 1933
- Consecration: 13 May 1955 by Teodósio de Gouveia

Personal details
- Born: 26 January 1910 Beduído, Estarreja, Aveiro District, Kingdom of Portugal and the Algarves
- Died: 2 March 1999 (aged 89)

Francisco Nunes Teixeira (26 January 1910 − 2 March 1999) was a Portuguese-born Mozambican Roman Catholic bishop.

Ordained to the priesthood in 1933, Teixeira was named bishop in February 1955. In May 1955, he was appointed bishop of the Roman Catholic Diocese of Quelimane, Mozambique and resigned in 1975.
