= Jaime Pedro Gonçalves =

Mozambican Catholic archbishop

- Archbishop of Beira
- Church: Catholic Church
- Archdiocese: Archdiocese of Beira
- In office: 3 December 1976 – 14 January 2012
- Predecessor: Ernesto Gonçalves da Costa
- Successor: Claudio Dalla Zuanna
- Previous posts: Titular Bishop of Ficus (1975-1976); Coadjutor Bishop of Beira (1975-1976)

Orders
- Ordination: 17 December 1967
- Consecration: 28 March 1976 by Januário Machaze Nhangumbe

Personal details
- Born: 26 November 1936 Manica, Colony of Mozambique, Portuguese Empire
- Died: 6 April 2016 (aged 79)

Jaime Pedro Gonçalves (26 November 1936 – 6 April 2016) was a Mozambican Catholic archbishop.

He was born in Nova Sofala and attended seminary in Tete; he also studied Theology and Social Sciences in Canada and Rome.

Ordained to the priesthood in 1967, Gonçalves was named a bishop of the Archdiocese of Beira in Mozambique in 1976 and was named archbishop in 1984. He was one of the mediators assisting with the peace talks between Renamo rebel movement and the Mozambican government during the Mozambican Civil War. Rome General Peace Accords were reached on 4 October 1992.

He was the first Chancellor of the Universidade Católica de Moçambique (UCM) in Beira.

He retired in 2012, and died in 2016.
