= Diocese of Quelimane =

Roman Catholic diocese in Mozambique

Coordinates: 17°52′35″S 36°53′14″E

Diocese of Quelimane Dioecesis Quelimanensis
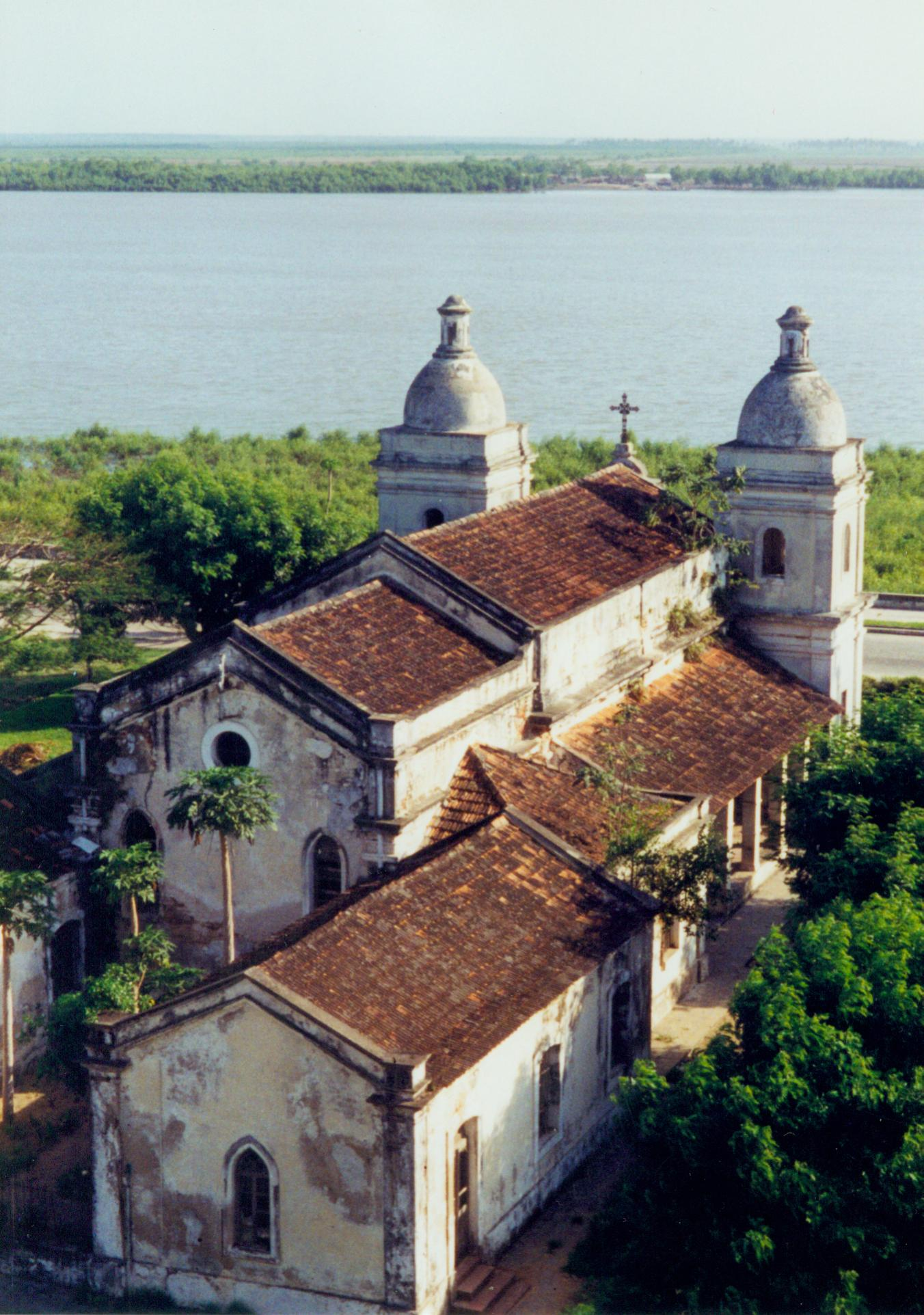
- The Old Cathedral of Quelimane

Location
- Country: Mozambique
- Metropolitan: Beira

Statistics
- Area: 62,557 km^{2} (24,153 sq mi)
- Population: Total; Catholics: (as of 2025); 3,440,268; 1,366,593 (39.7%)

Information
- Rite: Latin Rite
- Cathedral: Catedral Nova
- Patron saint: Our Lady of Liberation

Current leadership
- Pope: Leo XIV
- Bishop: Sede vacante
- Apostolic Administrator: Estêvão Ângelo Fernando
- Bishops emeritus: Hilário da Cruz Massinga O.F.M.

The Roman Catholic Diocese of Quelimane (Latin: Quelimanen(sis)) is a diocese located in the city of Quelimane in the ecclesiastical province of Beira in Mozambique.

== History ==
- 6 October 1954 – The Diocese of Quelimane was established with territory taken from the Diocese of Beira.
- 6 December 1993 – Lost territory due to the erection of the Diocese of Gurúè
- 23 January 2025 – Lost territory due to the erection of the Diocese of Alto Molócuè.

== Cathedral ==
The Cathedral is the Catedral Nova in Quelimane. The former cathedral is Catedral velha de Nossa Senhora do Livramento in Quelimane.

== Bishops of Quelimane ==
- Francisco Nunes Teixeira (6 February 1955 – 23 December 1975)
- Bernardo Filipe Governo, OFM Cap (31 May 1976 – 10 March 2007)
- Hilário da Cruz Massinga, OFM (25 January 2008 – 11 August 2023, appointed Auxiliary Bishop of Inhambane)
- Osório Citora Afonso, I.M.C. (25 July 2025 – 6 June 2026)
  - Estêvão Ângelo Fernando (since 12 June 2026), Apostolic Administrator

== Priests of this diocese appointed bishops elsewhere ==
- Bishop Estêvão Ângelo Fernando, appointed bishop of Alto Molócuè (since 23 January 2025)

== See also ==
- Catholic Church in Mozambique
- List of Catholic dioceses in Mozambique

== Sources ==
- GCatholic.org
- Catholic Hierarchy
