= Alto Molocue District =

Coordinates: 15.631°S 37.692°E

Location within Mozambique

Alto Molocue District is a district of Zambezia Province in Mozambique. It covers, 6,368 km^{2} and has a population of, 278,064.
