= Archdiocese of Beira =

Roman Catholic archdiocese in Mozambique

Coordinates: 19°50′S 34°51′E

Archdiocese of Beira Archidioecesis Beirensis
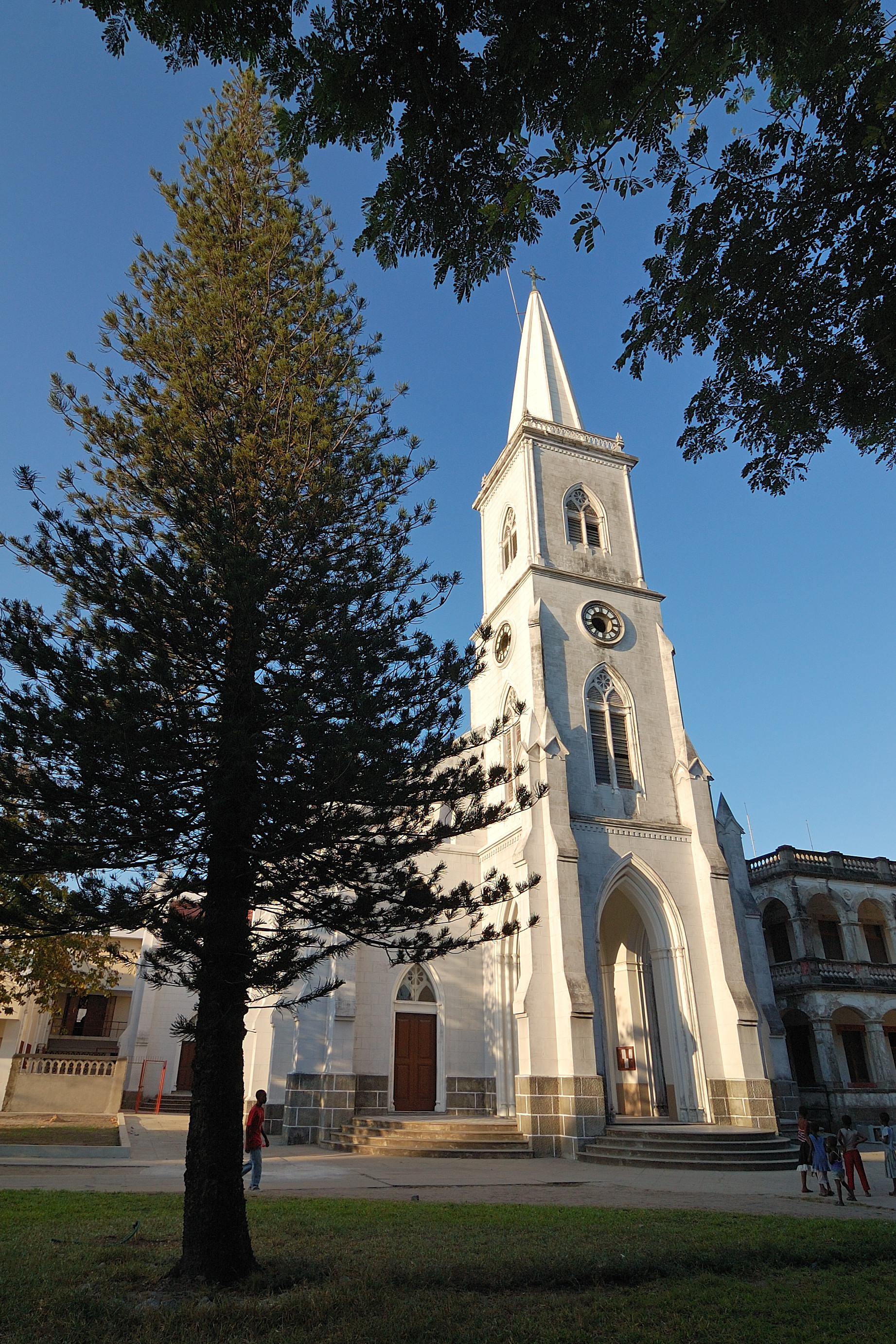
- Cathedral Church of Our Lady of the Rosary in Beira

Location
- Country: Mozambique
- Ecclesiastical province: Beira

Statistics
- Population: Total; Catholics: (as of 2018); 1,809,630; 1,005,480 (55.6%)

Information
- Denomination: Roman Catholic
- Rite: Roman Rite
- Established: 4 September 1940
- Cathedral: Cathedral Church of Our Lady of the Rosary in Beira, Beira

Current leadership
- Pope: Leo XIV
- Archbishop: sede vacante
- Apostolic Administrator: António Manuel Bogaio Constantino, M.C.C.I.

The Roman Catholic Archdiocese of Beira (Latin: Beiren(sis)) is the Metropolitan See for the ecclesiastical province of Beira in Mozambique.

== History ==
- 4 September 1940: Established as Diocese of Beira from the Territorial Prelature of Mozambique
- 6 October 1954: Lost territory due to the erection of the Diocese of Quelimane
- 4 June 1984: Promoted as Metropolitan Archdiocese of Beira

== Special churches ==
The seat of the archbishop is Catedral Metropolitana de Nossa Senhora de Rosario (Cathedral Church of Our Lady of the Rosary) in Beira.

== Bishops ==
- Bishops of Beira (Roman rite)
  - Bishop Sebastião Soares de Resende (21 April 1943 – 25 January 1967)
  - Bishop Manuel Ferreira Cabral (3 July 1967 – 1 July 1971)
  - Bishop Altino Ribeiro de Santana (1972 – 27 February 1973)
  - Bishop Ernesto Gonçalves Costa, O.F.M. (23 December 1974 – 3 December 1976)
  - Bishop Jaime Pedro Gonçalves (3 December 1976 – 4 June 1984 see below)
- Metropolitan Archbishops of Beira (Roman rite)
  - Archbishop Jaime Pedro Gonçalves (see below 4 June 1984 – 14 January 2012)
  - Archbishop Claudio Dalla Zuanna, S.C.I. (29 June 2012 – 10 April 2026); formerly, Vicar General of the Dehonians
  - Bishop Osório Citora Afonso, I.M.C. (10 April 2026 – 6 June 2026), Apostolic Administrator
  - Bishop António Manuel Bogaio Constantino, M.C.C.I. (since 12 June 2026), Apostolic Administrator

=== Coadjutor Bishop ===
- Jaime Pedro Gonçalves (1975-1976)

=== Auxiliary Bishop ===
- Francisco João Silota, M. Afr. (1988-1990), appointed Bishop of Chimoio

=== Another priest of this diocese who became bishop ===
- Francisco Nunes Teixeira, appointed Bishop of Quelimane in 1955

== Suffragan dioceses ==
- Chimoio
- Quelimane
- Tete
- Caia

== See also ==
- Roman Catholicism in Mozambique
- List of Roman Catholic dioceses in Mozambique

== Sources ==
- GCatholic.org

- Arquidiocese da Beira. Resenha Histórica, Beira: Archdiocese of Beira, 1988
