= Quelimane =

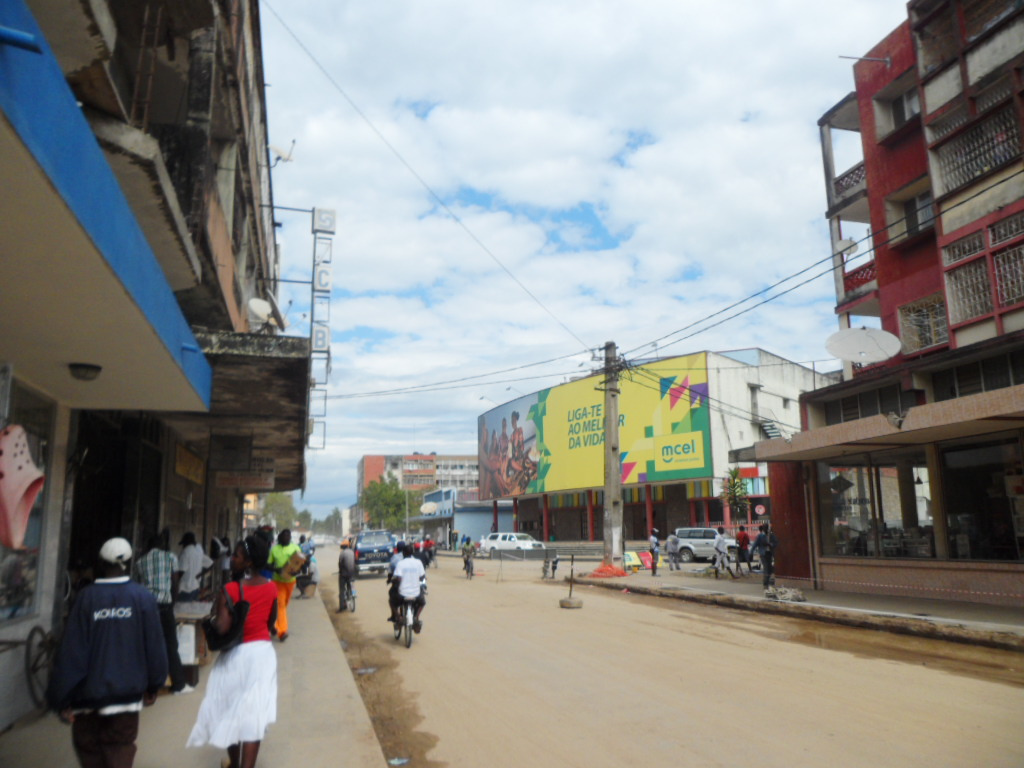
- Quelimane

- Location within Mozambique
- Coordinates: 17°52′35″S 36°53′14″E
- Country: Mozambique
- Provinces: Zambezia Province
- City Status: 1942

Area
  - Total: 117 km^{2} (45 sq mi)
- Elevation: 1 m (3.3 ft)

Population (2017 census)
  - Total: 349,842
  - Density: 2,990/km^{2} (7,740/sq mi)
- Climate: Aw

Quelimane (Portuguese pronunciation: [keliˈmani]) is a seaport in Mozambique. It is the administrative capital of the Zambezia Province and the province's largest city, and stands 25 km (16 mi) from the mouth of the Rio dos Bons Sinais (or "River of the Good Signs"). The river was named when Vasco da Gama, on his way to India, reached it and saw "good signs" that he was on the right path. The town was the end point of David Livingstone's west-to-east crossing of south-central Africa in 1856. Portuguese is the official language of Mozambique, and many residents of the areas surrounding Quelimane speak Portuguese. The most common local language is Chuabo. Quelimane, along with much of Zambezia Province, is extremely prone to floods during Mozambique's rainy season.

== History ==
=== Pre-colonial era ===
The town originated as a Swahili trade centre, and then grew as a slave market of the Indian Ocean slave trade. Quelimane was founded by Muslim traders (see Kilwa Sultanate) and was one of the oldest towns in the region.

=== Etymology ===
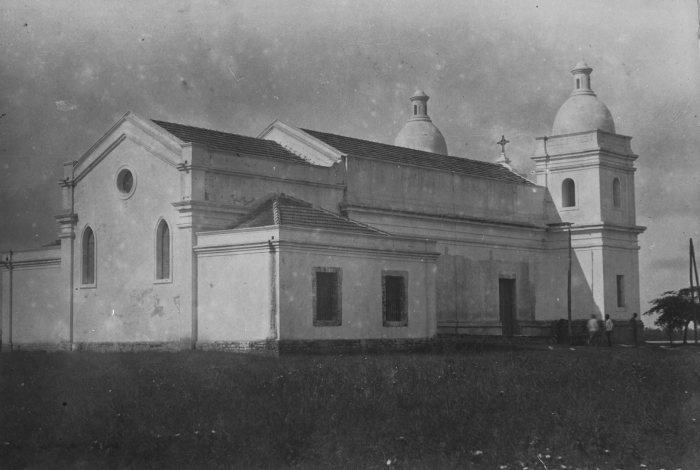
Cathedral of Quelimane in between 1890 and 1910

The origins of the name 'Quelimane' are obscure. One tradition alleges that Vasco da Gama, in 1498, inquired about the name of the place from some inhabitants labouring in the fields outside the settlement. Thinking he was asking what they were doing, they simply replied kuliamani ('we are cultivating').

An alternative explanation is that when the Portuguese reached the settlement, they were welcomed by a notable Arab, or half Arab, who acted as interpreter between them and the natives. The name which the Portuguese applied to this individual, and his settlement, was 'Quelimane' (pronounced Kelimãn), because in the corrupt Arabic spoken on the East African coast 'Kalimãn' is the word for 'Interpreter'. In Swahili it is 'Mkalimani'.

In 1761, the settlement became a town. Until 1853 trade was forbidden to any other than Portuguese. Sisal plantations were organized by Swiss planters in the beginning of the 20th century, namely Joseph Émile Stucky de Quay. The town started to grow and attracted several communities from different backgrounds, including Muslims and Indians, and new infrastructure was built by the Portuguese authorities. Its busy port had tea, grown and processed in the district of Zambézia (particularly important in the region around Gurúè, formerly Vila Junqueiro), as its major export. Coconut was also produced and processed in the city. By 1970, Quelimane had 71,786 inhabitants.

=== Independence ===
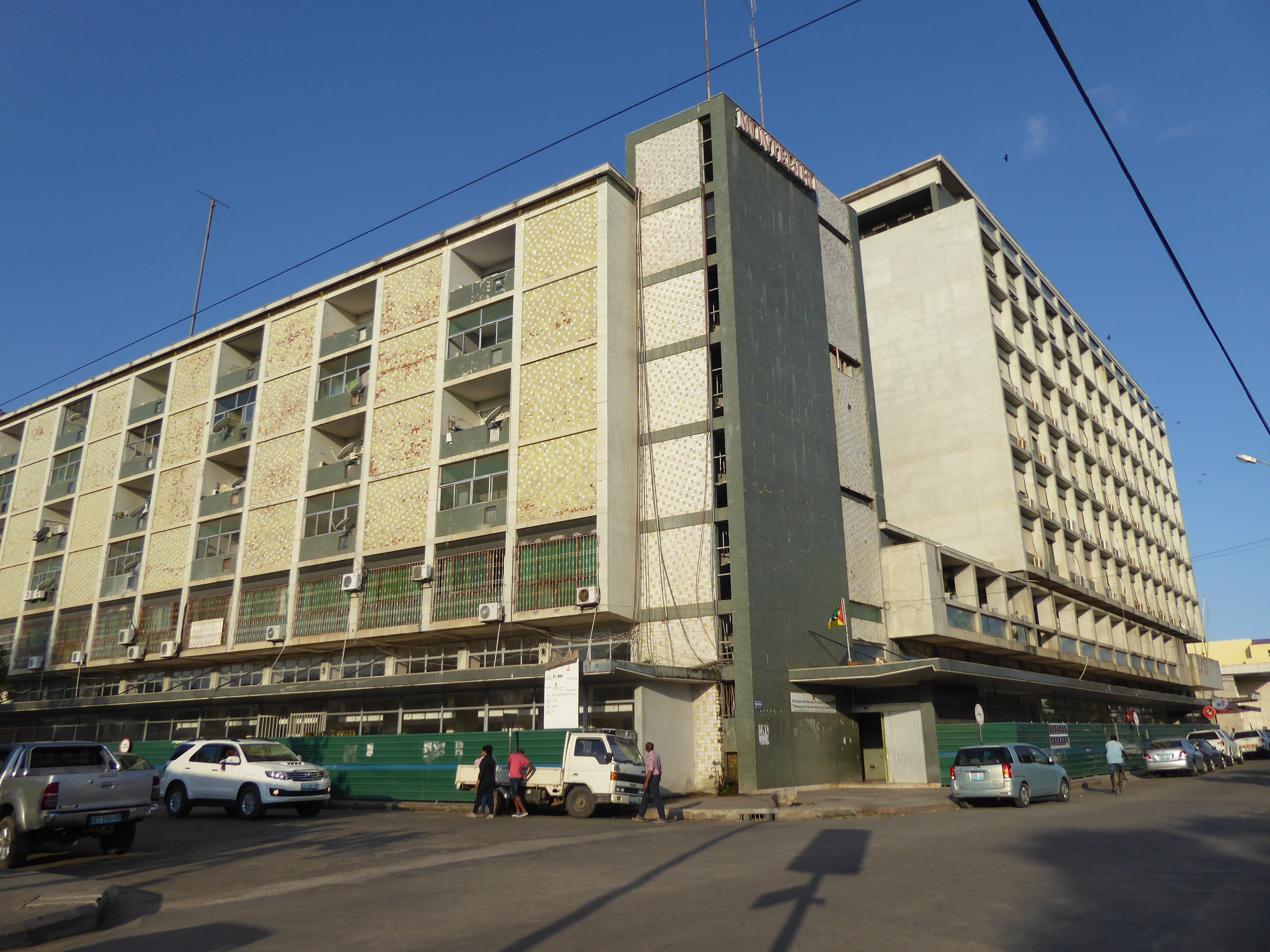
Montegiro building, Quelimane

Mozambique became independent from Portugal in 1975, after the April 1974 Carnation Revolution at Lisbon. Although its location on the Rio dos Bons Sinais is less important today than in the past, Quelimane remains a major town with a large hospital, two cathedrals, a mosque, and a public university for teachers. Due to its heat, humidity, and distance from the beach, Quelimane is not among Mozambique's major tourist destinations. However, its status as a provincial capital and the fourth-largest city in Mozambique and the increasing ease of access by plane (Linhas Aéreas de Moçambique runs flights) and road contribute to a small but relatively steady stream of visitors. In addition, Quelimane is home to branches of many international NGOs, and frequent visits from foreign aid consultants, workers, and government officials also contribute to the economy. The city received a further boost when Quelimane hosted the Ninth Annual Frelimo Party Convention in November 2006. After decades of municipal decline, the current mayor, Manuel de Araujo, is reportedly overseeing a renewed civic effort at economic and infrastructural restoration.

=== Tropical Cyclones ===
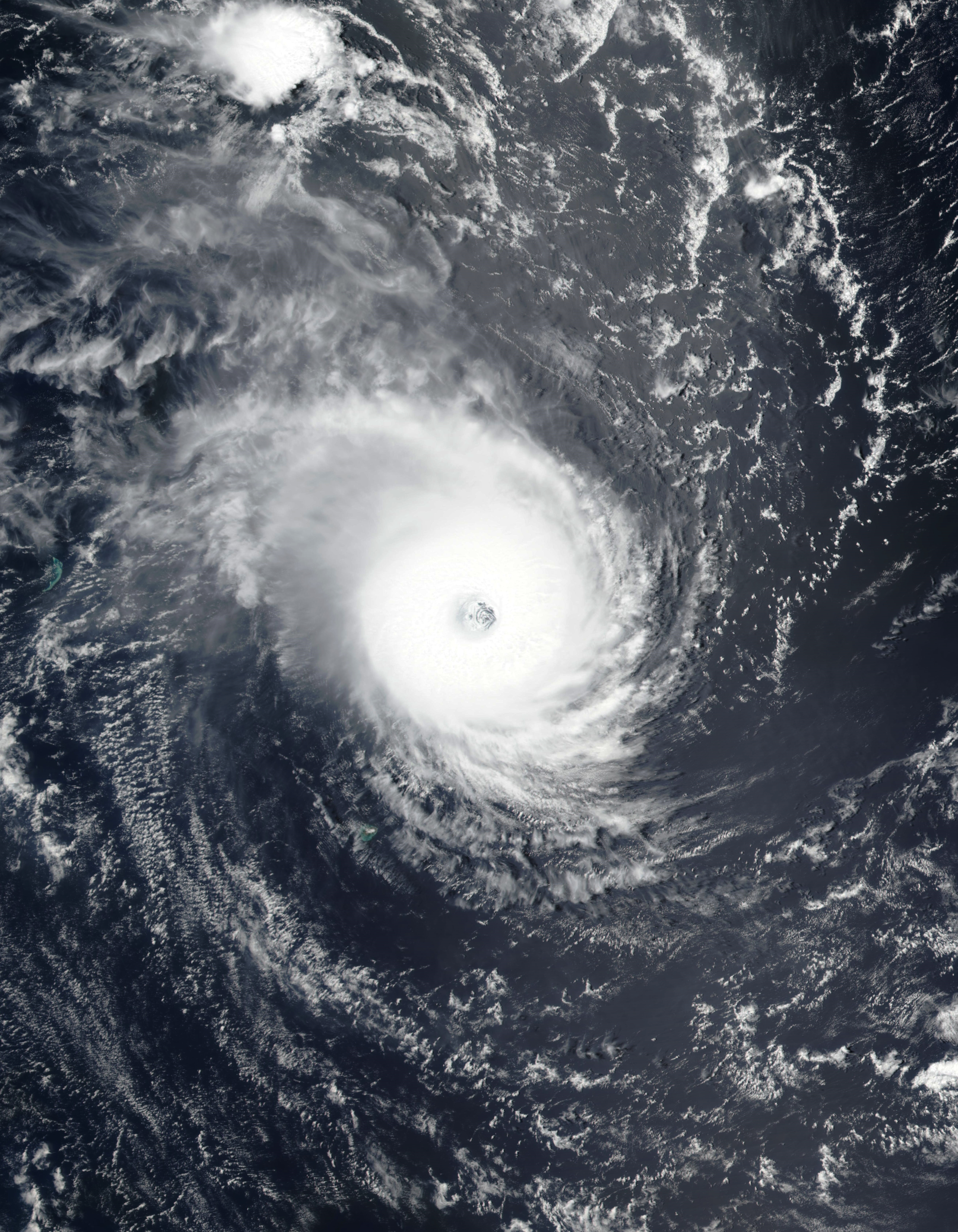
Cyclone Freddy at its peak intensity in the South-West Indian Ocean in 2023.

- Cyclone Filao in 1988 made landfall near Quelimane, causing many deaths. The damage was also the heaviest from this storm in Quelimane.
- Cyclone Nadia in 1994 struck the northern coast of Mozambique, including Quelimane.
- Cyclone Bonita in 1996 struck the northern coast of Mozambique 2 years after Nadia.
- Cyclone Hudah in 2000 made landfall in Northern Mozambique after making landfall in Madagascar.
- Cyclone Idai affected Quelimane as a tropical depression in 2019.
- Severe Tropical Storm Chalane in 2020 was a category 1-equivalent cyclone that made landfall in Madagascar and northern Mozambique before moving across Southern Africa, into the South Atlantic, and then dissipating.
- Cyclone Freddy made landfall near Quelimane in the 2022–23 South-West Indian Ocean cyclone season after crossing over from the Australian region and making landfall in Madagascar and again in Mozambique. This storm caused tons of damages and fatalities for everywhere it impacted.

== Places of worship ==
Among the places of worship, they are predominantly Christian churches and temples: Roman Catholic Diocese of Quelimane (Catholic Church), (Reformed Church in Mozambique (World Communion of Reformed Churches), Igreja Presbiteriana de Moçambique (World Communion of Reformed Churches), Convenção Baptista de Moçambique (Baptist World Alliance), Universal Church of the Kingdom of God, Assemblies of God, Zion Christian Church. There are also Muslim mosques.

== Demographics ==
| Year (census) | Population |
|---|---|
| 1997 | 150,116 |
| 2007 | 193,343 |
| 2017 | 349,842 |

== Climate ==
Quelimane has a tropical savanna climate (Köppen climate classification Aw).

Climate data for Quelimane (1991–2020 normals, extremes 1961–1990, 2005–2023)
| Month | Jan | Feb | Mar | Apr | May | Jun | Jul | Aug | Sep | Oct | Nov | Dec | Year |
|---|---|---|---|---|---|---|---|---|---|---|---|---|---|
| Record high °C (°F) | 40.5 (104.9) | 39.4 (102.9) | 38.4 (101.1) | 37.2 (99.0) | 38.0 (100.4) | 34.4 (93.9) | 34.5 (94.1) | 37.2 (99.0) | 41.2 (106.2) | 44.0 (111.2) | 43.6 (110.5) | 43.4 (110.1) | 44.0 (111.2) |
| Mean daily maximum °C (°F) | 32.5 (90.5) | 32.9 (91.2) | 32.0 (89.6) | 30.5 (86.9) | 29.2 (84.6) | 28.0 (82.4) | 27.3 (81.1) | 28.7 (83.7) | 31.4 (88.5) | 32.5 (90.5) | 33.9 (93.0) | 33.6 (92.5) | 31.0 (87.9) |
| Daily mean °C (°F) | 27.9 (82.2) | 27.8 (82.0) | 27.3 (81.1) | 25.6 (78.1) | 23.6 (74.5) | 21.6 (70.9) | 21.2 (70.2) | 22.3 (72.1) | 24.3 (75.7) | 26.1 (79.0) | 27.5 (81.5) | 28.1 (82.6) | 25.3 (77.5) |
| Mean daily minimum °C (°F) | 24.5 (76.1) | 24.6 (76.3) | 24.2 (75.6) | 22.0 (71.6) | 19.4 (66.9) | 16.7 (62.1) | 16.2 (61.2) | 17.0 (62.6) | 19.1 (66.4) | 21.2 (70.2) | 22.8 (73.0) | 23.8 (74.8) | 21.0 (69.7) |
| Record low °C (°F) | 18.9 (66.0) | 17.9 (64.2) | 17.2 (63.0) | 15.9 (60.6) | 11.9 (53.4) | 9.9 (49.8) | 10.1 (50.2) | 10.3 (50.5) | 11.1 (52.0) | 12.8 (55.0) | 14.1 (57.4) | 15.9 (60.6) | 9.9 (49.8) |
| Average precipitation mm (inches) | 241.4 (9.50) | 238.8 (9.40) | 237.5 (9.35) | 153.3 (6.04) | 82.3 (3.24) | 56.0 (2.20) | 62.4 (2.46) | 29.0 (1.14) | 18.5 (0.73) | 34.1 (1.34) | 88.2 (3.47) | 219.5 (8.64) | 1,461 (57.52) |
| Average precipitation days (≥ 1.0 mm) | 11.4 | 12.9 | 13.1 | 9.9 | 7.6 | 7.9 | 8.1 | 4.3 | 2.1 | 2.8 | 5.2 | 10.6 | 95.9 |
| Average relative humidity (%) | 78 | 78 | 79 | 79 | 79 | 81 | 79 | 77 | 74 | 68 | 72 | 74 | 77 |
| Mean monthly sunshine hours | 220.1 | 194.9 | 226.3 | 228.0 | 238.7 | 216.0 | 229.4 | 263.5 | 261.0 | 257.3 | 279.0 | 238.7 | 2,852.9 |
| Mean daily sunshine hours | 7.1 | 6.9 | 7.3 | 7.6 | 7.7 | 7.2 | 7.4 | 8.5 | 8.7 | 8.3 | 9.3 | 7.7 | 7.8 |
Source: Deutscher Wetterdienst (precipitation, humidity and sun 1961–1990) Starlings Roost Weather

== See also ==
- Railway stations in Mozambique
- Quelimane Airport
- Cyclone Freddy (2023) - A tropical cyclone that made landfall near Quelimane
- Cyclone Filao (1988) - A tropical cyclone that made landfall near Quelimane

== International relations ==
=== Twin towns — Sister cities ===
Quelimane is twinned with:

- Le Port, Réunion
