= Claudio Dalla Zuanna =

Argentine-born Italian Catholic archbishop-emeritus (born 1958)

Claudio Dalla Zuanna S.C.I.
- Archbishop Emeritus of Beira
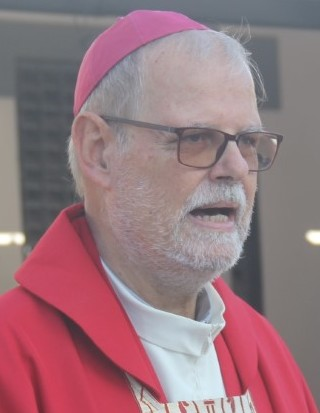
- Claudio Dalla Zuanna in 2022
- Church: Catholic Church
- Archdiocese: Archdiocese of Beira
- In office: 29 June 2012 – 10 April 2026
- Predecessor: Jaime Pedro Gonçalves
- Successor: Sede vacante

Orders
- Ordination: 23 June 1984
- Consecration: 7 October 2012 by Lucio Andrice Muandula

Personal details
- Born: 7 November 1958 (age 67) Buenos Aires, Argentina
- Motto: Ut Vitam Habeant
- Coat of arms

Claudio Dalla Zuanna (born 7 November 1958) is an Argentine-born Italian Catholic archbishop. In 2012 he was appointed Archbishop of Beira, in Mozambique. He resigned as archbishop on 10 April 2026, at the age of 67 years.

Dalla Zuanna was born in Buenos Aires, Argentina on 7 November 1958 to Italian parents. When he was a child his family moved back to their town of origin (San Nazario, in the province of Vicenza and Roman Catholic Diocese of Padua). After scuole medie he attended the educatational institutions of the Priests of the Sacred Heart and became a member of their congregation.

Ordained a priest in 1984, he travelled to Mozambique the next year as a missionary and remained there until 2003. While there he held several important offices in the church; from 2009 he was vicar general.

On 7 October 2012 he returned to Mozambique after being named Archbishop of Beira. His consecration took place in the basketball stadium of the railway club of Beira and was carried out by the president of the episcopal conference of Mozambique, Lucio Andrice Muandula. On 29 June 2013, Pope Francis granted him the pallium during a ceremony in St Peter's Basilica on the Feast of Saints Peter and Paul. On 10 April 2026, Archbishop Claudio Dalla Zuanna resigned from the pastoral care of the Ecclesiastical Metropolitan Province of Beira, Mozambique. Pope Leo XIV accepted his resignation that day.

== Bibliography ==
- "Papa Francesco consegna il pallio al nuovo arcivescovo Ghizzoni". il Resto del Carlino. 29 June 2013.
