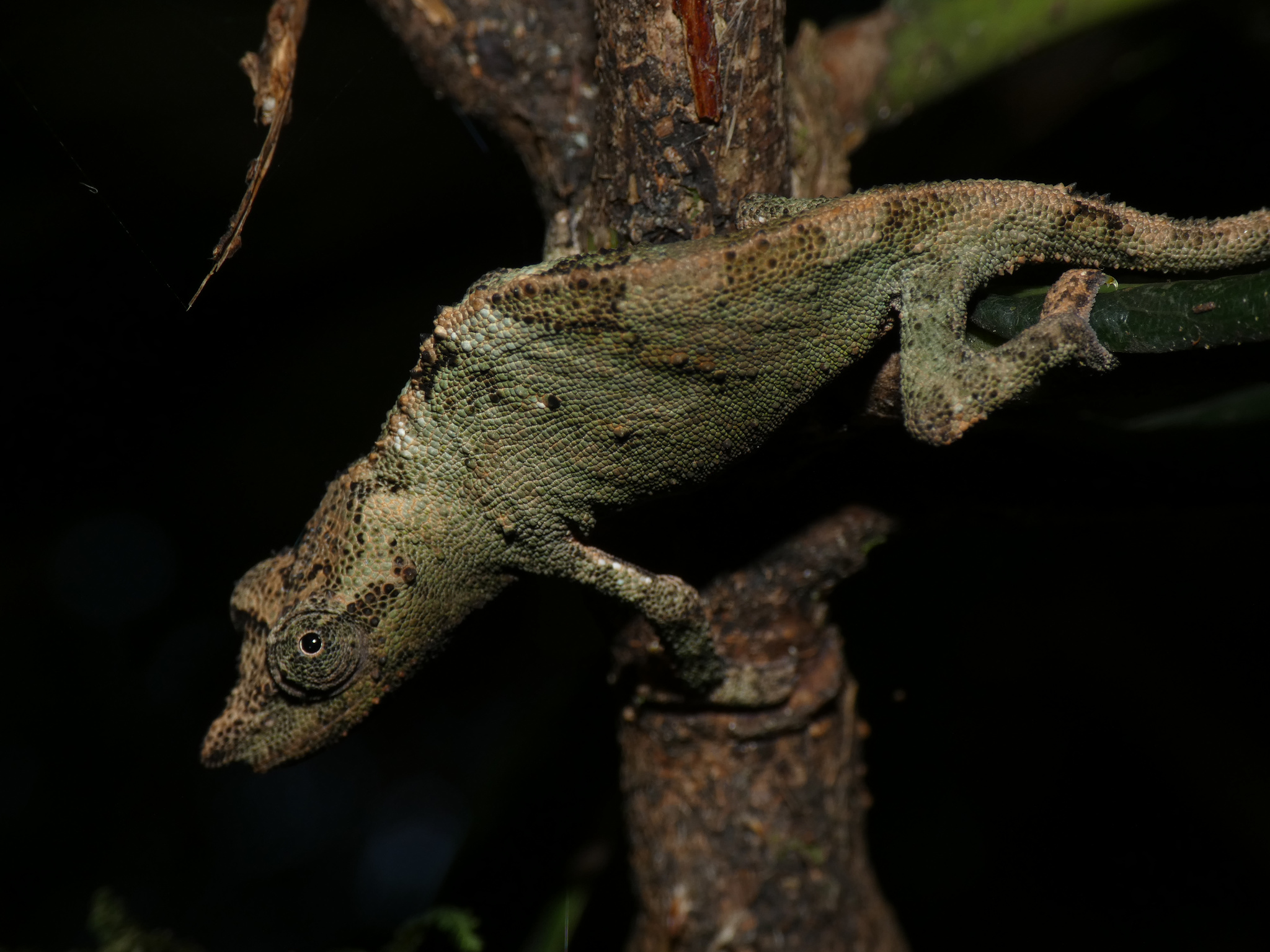

Conservation status
- Vulnerable (IUCN 3.1)

Scientific classification
- Kingdom: Animalia
- Phylum: Chordata
- Class: Reptilia
- Order: Squamata
- Suborder: Iguania
- Family: Chamaeleonidae
- Genus: Rhampholeon
- Species: R. marshalli

Binomial name
- Rhampholeon marshalli Boulenger, 1906
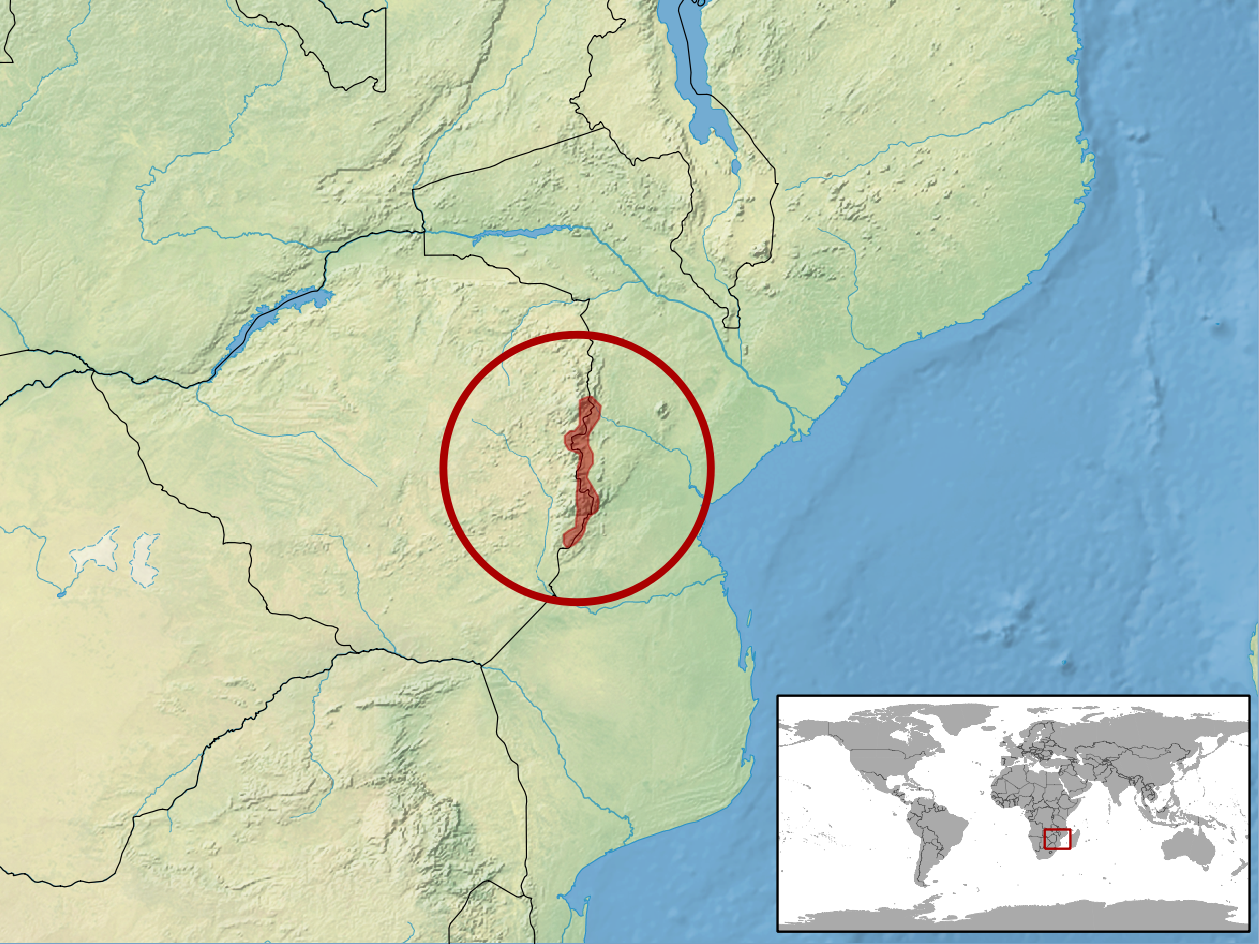

= Marshall's pygmy chameleon =

Species of lizard

Marshall's pygmy chameleon (Rhampholeon marshalli), also called commonly Marshall's leaf chameleon, Marshall's dwarf chameleon, and Marshall's stumptail chameleon, is a species of lizard in the family Chamaeleonidae. The species is native to the forests of Zimbabwe and Mozambique in Africa. It grows to a snout-to-vent length (SVL) of 3.5–7.5 cm (1.4–3.0 in) and feeds on insects. When staying still, it resembles a leaf on a branch.

== Etymology ==
The specific name, marshalli, is in honor of British entomologist Guy Anstruther Knox Marshall, who collected the holotype.

== Identification ==
Marshall's leaf chameleon is unmistakable. It is the only such tiny chameleon in its range (sympatric with Chamaeleo dilepis quilensis, the flap-necked chameleon to a degree). This is a tiny species of 3.2–7.5 cm (1.3–3.0 in) (SVL), females being slightly larger than males. Isolated populations have distinct size variations; for example, those found just to the north of Mutare appear to be larger than those just to the south (separated by deep valleys). It has a dorsoventrally flattened head and body with prominent ribs and apparent venation, giving it the appearance of a leaf. Its colour variations are from deep brown to yellowish green according to the camouflage required for the situation. Males are usually more brightly coloured.

=== Breeding ===
Males, being slightly smaller, having a distinct penial swelling at the base of the tail, and a greener throat with a row of defining white or yellow tubercle spots, are relatively easy to distinguish from females.

=== Sympatric species ===
Little habitat overlap occurs as that of C. dilepsis approaches the range of Marshall's leaf chameleon. C. dilepis is rare, found in low, probably transitory population densities at the altitudes inhabited by R. marshalli, preferring the sunnier grasslands and forest margins.

=== Related species ===
- Rhampholeon gorongosae Broadley, 1971, once considered a subspecies and later raised to species, is found in similar habitats on the Mount Gorongosa massif in adjacent Mozambique. It was discovered by the ornithologist Stuart Irwin.
- Rhampholeon platyceps Günther, 1893, is found in similar habitats on the Mt Mulanje in adjacent Malawi.

=== Karyotopic taxonomy ===
Wright (1973) confirmed that the number and form of the chromosomes from specimens provided by Broadley put R. marshalli in the genus Rhampholeon with Rhampholeon spectrum, the type species for the genus having 36 pairs of chromosomes like the other members of this genus.

== Distribution ==
Rhampholeon marshalli is found largely in the Eastern Highlands of Zimbabwe and the adjacent upland forest of Mozambique.

== Habitat ==
The patches of relict montane forest found in the Nyanga, Bvumba, Himalaya and Chimanimani Mountains are the primary habitats of Rhampholeon marshalli. It can be found in the cool, damp interior of the forest, mostly in the undercanopy and on the forest margins. These forest patches are surrounded by vast expanses of montane grassland, but are often so far apart as to be isolated from one another, but forest along the numerous mountain streams may link these very limited habitats. Marked specimens surveyed over a long time appeared not to travel far at all, usually less than 15 m (49 ft).

== Natural history ==
Rhampholeon marshalli seems to inhabit the subcanopy and leaf litter of the relict cloud forests. Major canopy trees include Syzygium and Ficus. These forest are rich in fern and liana species. Forest margins have prickly species of Ilex and Rubus briars. How far up the canopy this creature ascends is not known, but it tends to be found in the leaf litter or low shrubs. The winters in these (evergreen) forests are sharp and very cool; a period of brumation seems likely to occur for this tiny lizard. It eat insects, though these forests seem to be fairly depleted now.

=== Reproduction ===
In the rains (November to March), Marshall's leaf chameleon lays a small clutch of embryonated eggs that hatch quickly. Humphreys photographed a gravid female excavating a hole in the forest soil and laying a clutch. One egg was exhumed and found to contain a fully developed embryo. After 35 days, the eggs hatched and the tiny juveniles dispersed. Juveniles are relatively large at 22–25 mm (0.87–0.98 in) long (SVL).

== Conservation ==
Like other small mountain chameleons, Rhampholeon marshalli appears to have population spikes and collapses. Its range does not appear to be threatened and much of its habitat is safe in Zimbabwe in the Nyanga National Park (where introduced tree species of wattle and pine are being eradicated to allow natural forest to re-emerge), Stapleford Forest Reserve, Bunga National Park and Botanical Garden, the Chimanimani National Park, and the Chirinda Forest Reserve. However, the tiny relic cloud forest patches are under constant threat from excessive collection of firewood and clearance for coffee, tea and protea plantations. Also, the corridors that once connected populations have indubitably diminished.
