= Mount Inago =

Mountain in Mozambique

- Location within Mozambique

Highest point
- Elevation: 1,804 m (5,919 ft)
- Coordinates: 15°02′42″S 37°23′46″E

Geography
- Location: Mozambique

Mount Inago, also known as Serra Inago, is a mountain in northern Mozambique.

It is located in Nampula Province, 50 km northeast of Mount Namuli.

The plant communities on the mountain include woodlands, generally below 1000 meters elevation, riverine forests in stream valleys, mid-altitude moist forests between 1000 and 1600 meters elevation, and upland grasslands and rocky shrublands above 1500 meters elevation. Much of the mid-altitude moist forest and riverine forest has been cleared for cultivation, leaving the remaining forests fragmented.

It is home to the endemic Mount Inago pygmy chameleon (Rhampholeon bruessoworum). The 2009 expedition that identified the pygmy chameleon also identified possible new species of freshwater crab (Potamonautes sp.), butterfly (Cymothoe sp.), and cycad (Encephalartos sp.). It is one of two known locations where the Mount Mabu horseshoe bat (Rhinolophus mabuensis) is found, the other being the eponymous Mount Mabu.
