= Rhampholeon hattinghi =

Conservation status
- Critically Endangered (IUCN 3.1)

Scientific classification
- Kingdom: Animalia
- Phylum: Chordata
- Class: Reptilia
- Order: Squamata
- Suborder: Iguania
- Family: Chamaeleonidae
- Genus: Rhampholeon
- Species: R. hattinghi

Binomial name
- Rhampholeon hattinghi Tilbury & Tolley, 2015

Species of lizard

Rhampholeon hattinghi is a species of chameleon endemic to the Democratic Republic of the Congo.
