= Helixanthera schizocalyx =

- Detail of the type specimen, held by the Royal Gardens, Kew

Scientific classification
- Kingdom: Plantae
- Clade: Tracheophytes
- Clade: Angiosperms
- Clade: Eudicots
- Order: Santalales
- Family: Loranthaceae
- Genus: Helixanthera
- Species: H. schizocalyx

Binomial name
- Helixanthera schizocalyx T.Harris, I.Darbysh. & Polhill

Species of mistletoe

Helixanthera schizocalyx is a species of loranth, or tropical mistletoe, discovered by a research team from Royal Botanic Gardens, Kew on Mount Mabu in northern Mozambique in 2008. In December 2010, it was announced that it was a new discovery and determined to be vulnerable to extinction.

== Description ==
Helixanthera schizocalyx is a relative of the European and North American varieties of mistletoe. It is closely related to Helixanthera verruculosa, a species known only from the Southern Highlands of Tanzania. Helixanthera schizocalyx has been found attached to the branches of stunted trees such as the Psychotria zombamontana of the coffee family that grow where wet montane forests give way to bare granite peaks at the summit of Mount Mabu.

Helixanthera schizocalyx, which reaches a height of 50 cm, is hairless and parasitic. Its leaves are in opposite pairs and are thin and elliptic in shape. Mature flowers have not been observed, and senior research botanist at Kew, Bill Baker, said that berries have not yet been observed either. Five specimens have been collected as of December 2010.

The genus Helixanthera is apparently notable within the loranths in that most species seem to have flowers pollinated by insects, as opposed to birds.

== Discovery ==
Helixanthera schizocalyx was discovered in 2008 by East African butterfly specialist Colin Congdon in dense foliage on Mount Mabu in northern Mozambique. (Lepidopterists look for loranth species which support specialized butterfly species.) Congdon, who was part of a conservation and biodiversity research team from Kew, noticed that the plant was unlike any he knew from the mountains in Malawi and Tanzania.

In December 2010, scientists at Kew confirmed that it was a new species and that it is globally threatened and vulnerable to extinction because of its limited distribution. Helixanthera schizocalyx is listed at the top of Kew's "botanical discoveries of 2010" list.
