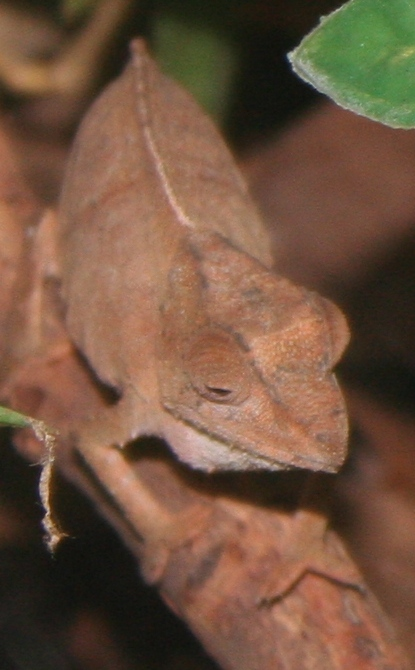

Conservation status
- Endangered (IUCN 3.1)

Scientific classification
- Kingdom: Animalia
- Phylum: Chordata
- Class: Reptilia
- Order: Squamata
- Suborder: Iguania
- Family: Chamaeleonidae
- Genus: Rhampholeon
- Species: R. temporalis

Binomial name
- Rhampholeon temporalis (Matschie, 1892)

= Rhampholeon temporalis =

Species of lizard

Rhampholeon temporalis, the Usambara stumptail chameleon or East Usambara pygmy chameleon, is a species of chameleon found in Tanzania.
