= Rhampholeon maspictus =

Conservation status
- Near Threatened (IUCN 3.1)

Scientific classification
- Kingdom: Animalia
- Phylum: Chordata
- Class: Reptilia
- Order: Squamata
- Suborder: Iguania
- Family: Chamaeleonidae
- Genus: Rhampholeon
- Species: R. maspictus

Binomial name
- Rhampholeon maspictus Branch, Bayliss, & Tolley, 2014
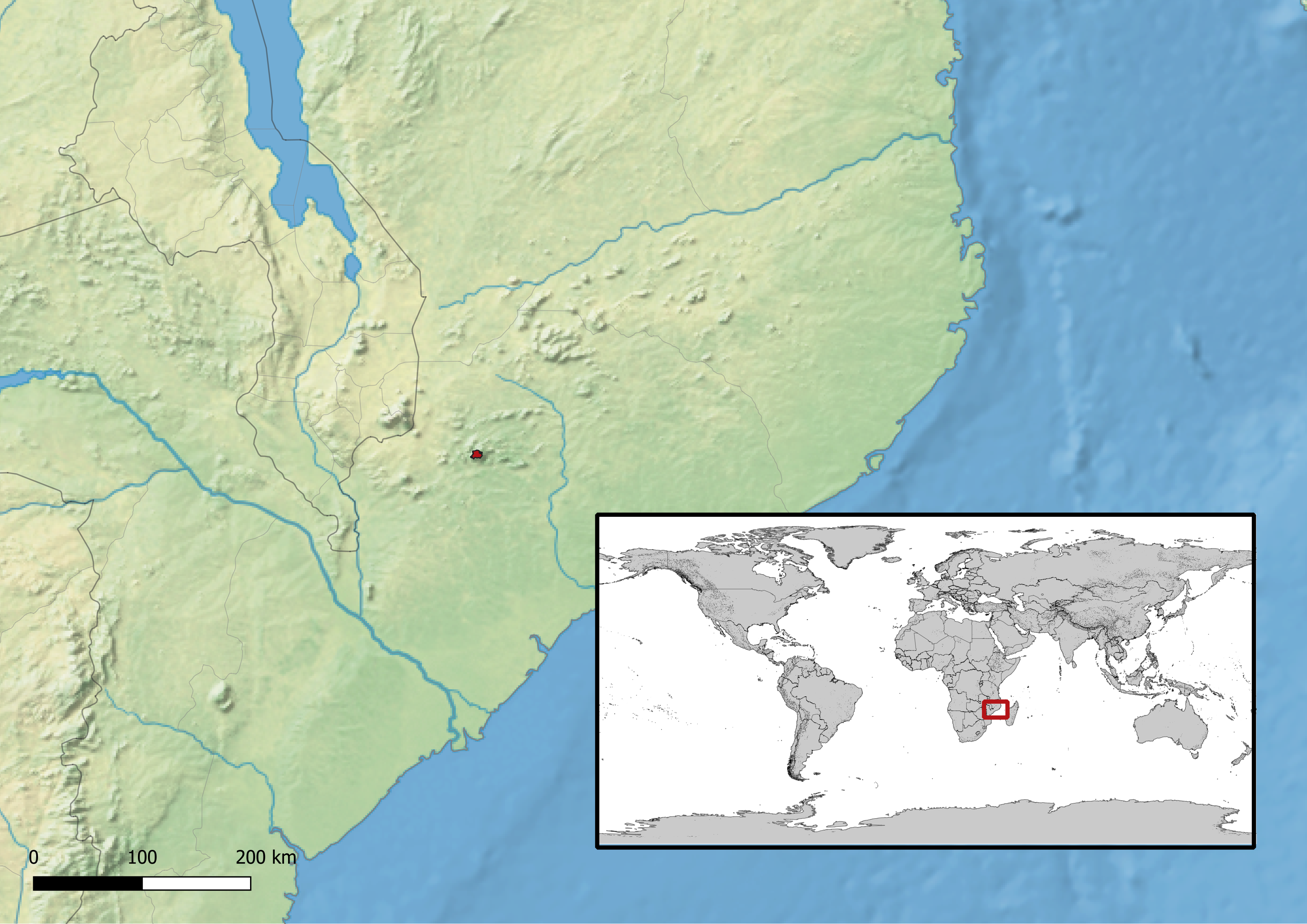
- Distribution of Rhampholeon maspictus

Species of lizard

Rhampholeon maspictus, the Mount Mabu pygmy chameleon, is a small native species of chameleon endemic to the tropical rainforests atop Mount Mabu in Zambezia, Mozambique. It is roughly 6 cm (2.4 in) long.

== Taxonomy ==
The specific epithet comes from the Latin "mas pictus," meaning "painted male," alluding to the unusual bright colours of most males, which are often retained for long periods, even when sleeping at night.

== Habitat and distribution ==
R. maspictus occupy a range of 61 to 75 km^{2} (24 to 29 sq mi), 900 to 1,400 metres (3,000 to 4,600 ft) above sea level on Mount Mabu. The species is classified as "Near Threatened" for the small range of its distribution and its specialization to its Afromontane forest environment, unable to persist in altered habitats. Though its forest environment is intact, the edges of the forest are experiencing pressure from encroachment due to deforestation for agriculture and logging. If deforestation is to continue, R. maspictus may rapidly become "Critically Endangered," though anthropogenic threats are expected to be mitigated by local conservation efforts.
