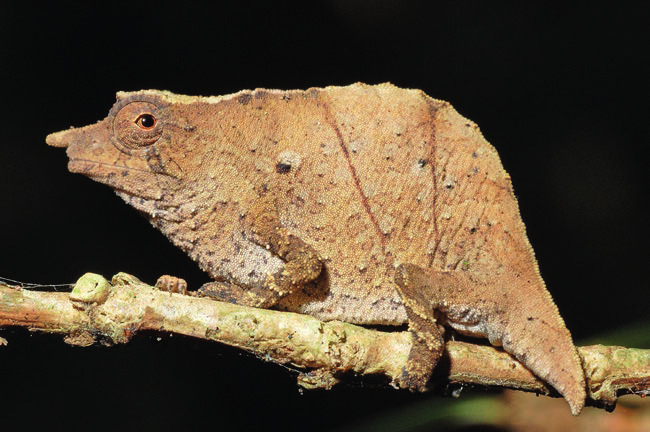

Conservation status
- Vulnerable (IUCN 3.1)

Scientific classification
- Kingdom: Animalia
- Phylum: Chordata
- Class: Reptilia
- Order: Squamata
- Suborder: Iguania
- Family: Chamaeleonidae
- Genus: Rhampholeon
- Species: R. beraduccii

Binomial name
- Rhampholeon beraduccii Mariaux & Tilbury, 2006

= Rhampholeon beraduccii =

Rhampholeon Beraducci

Species of lizard

Rhampholeon beraduccii, also known commonly as Beraducci's pygmy chameleon or the Mahenge pygmy chameleon, is a species of lizard in the family Chamaeleonidae. The species is endemic to Tanzania.

== Etymology ==
The specific name, beraduccii, is in honor of Italian herpetologist Joe Beraducci.

== Geographic range ==
R. beraducii is found in the Mahenge Mountains of Tanzania.

== Habitat ==
The preferred natural habitat of R. beraduccii is forest, at altitudes of 1,200–1,500 m (3,900–4,900 ft).

== Description ==
R. beraduccii is brown and very small. The maximum recorded snout-to-vent length (SVL) is only 28 mm (1.1 in). The tail is very short, about one fourth SVL.

== Reproduction ==
R. beraduccii is oviparous.
