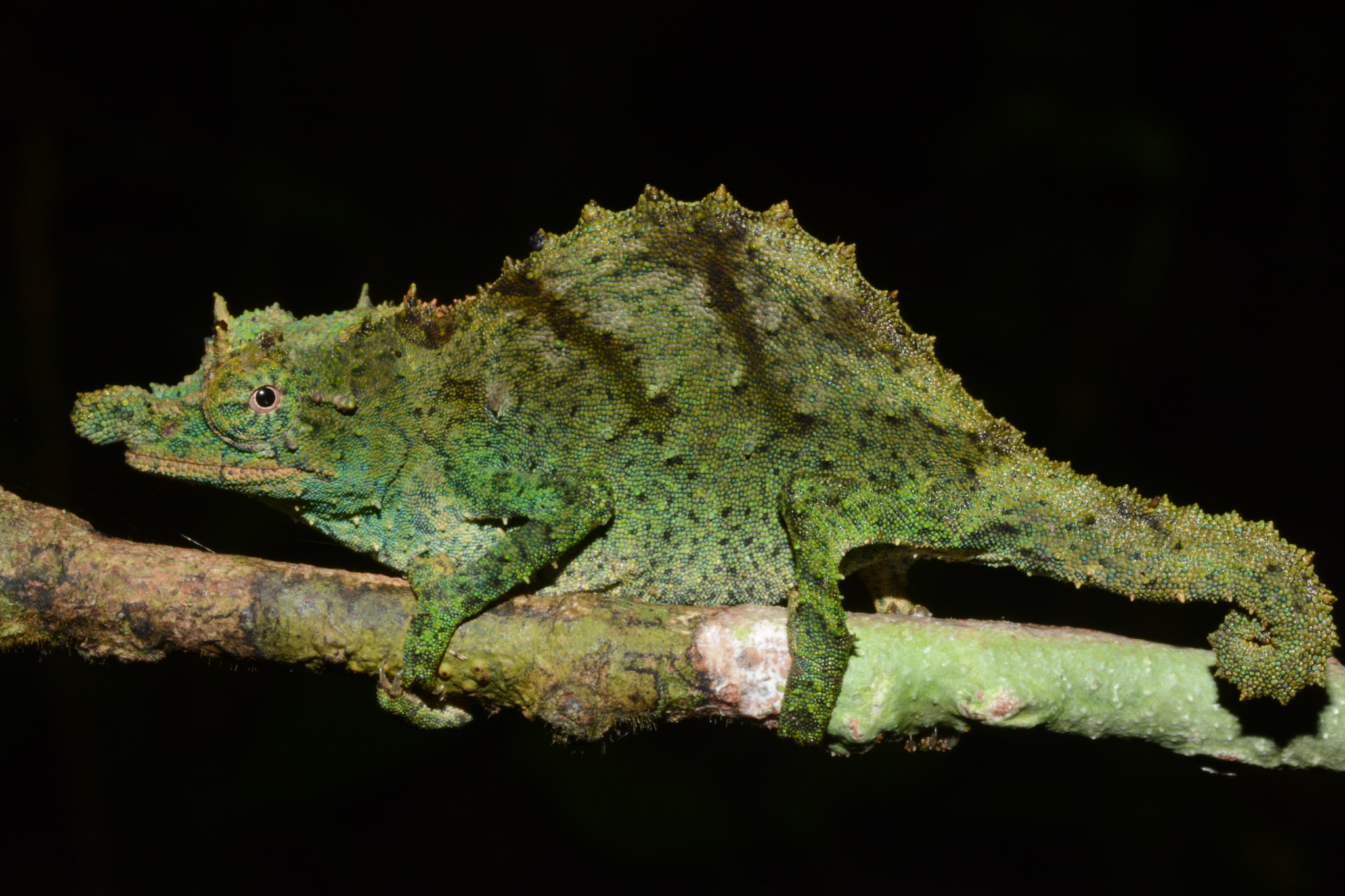

Conservation status
- Critically Endangered (IUCN 3.1)

Scientific classification
- Kingdom: Animalia
- Phylum: Chordata
- Class: Reptilia
- Order: Squamata
- Suborder: Iguania
- Family: Chamaeleonidae
- Genus: Rhampholeon
- Species: R. acuminatus

Binomial name
- Rhampholeon acuminatus Mariaux & Tilbury, 2006
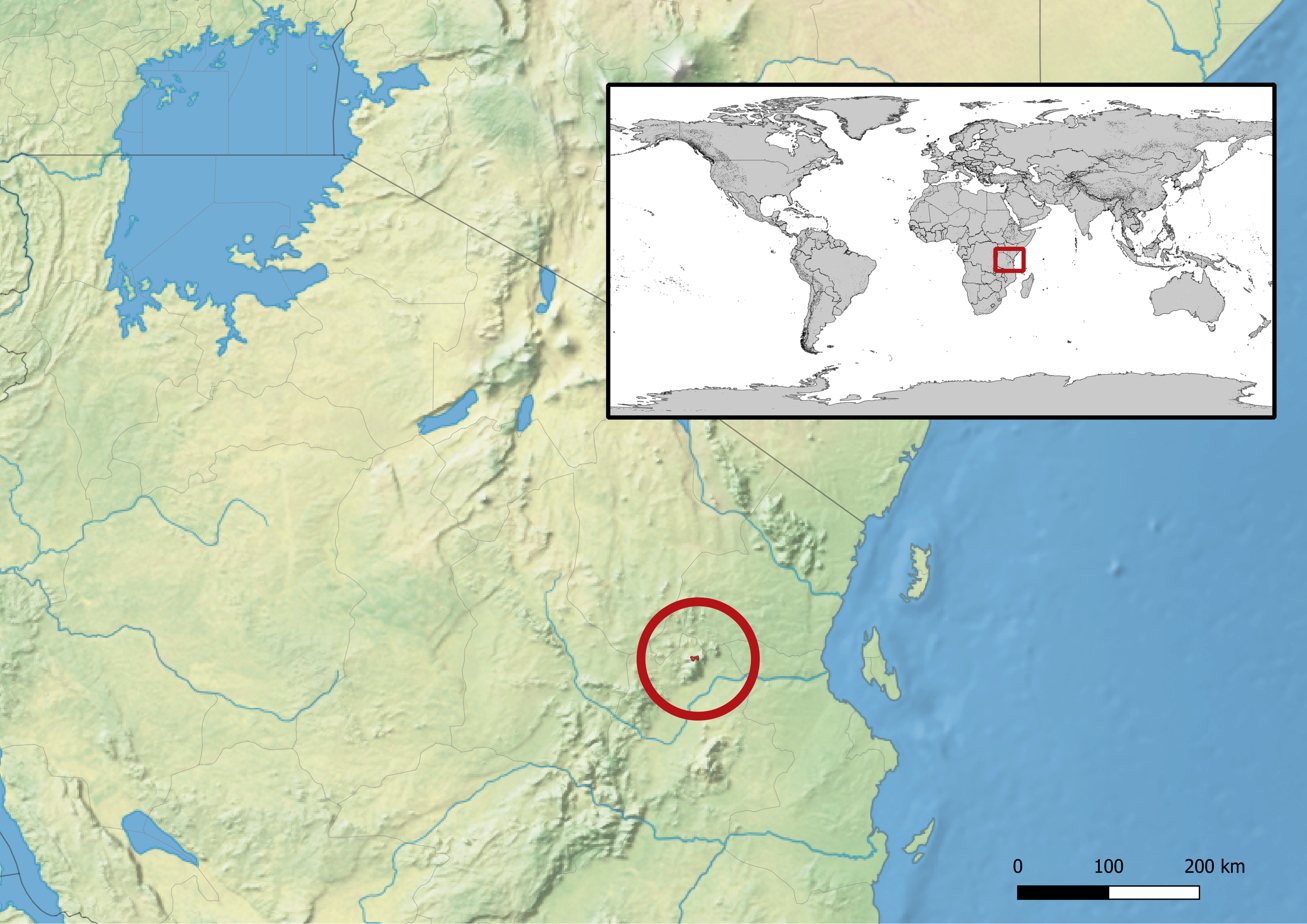

= Rhampholeon acuminatus =

Species of lizard

Rhampholeon acuminatus, also known commonly as the Nguru pygmy chameleon, is a species of chameleon, a lizard in the family Chamaeleonidae. The species is endemic to Tanzania.

== Distribution ==
Rhampholeon acuminatus is found in the Nguru Mountains of Tanzania. The type locality is "Tanzania, Morogoro region, Nguru Mountains, Nguru South Catchment FR, Komkore Forest above Ubili village [6°2'29" S; 37°30'40.5" E], elevation 1500–1600 m [4,921–5,249 ft]".

== Reproduction ==
Rhampholeon acuminatus is oviparous.

== Abundance ==
Rhampholeon acuminatus is only known from its original description (Meiri et al. 2017).

== Etymology ==
The specific name, acuminatus is the past participle of the Latin verb acuminare, meaning "to sharpen", in reference to the numerous sharp spines found on the head and body.
