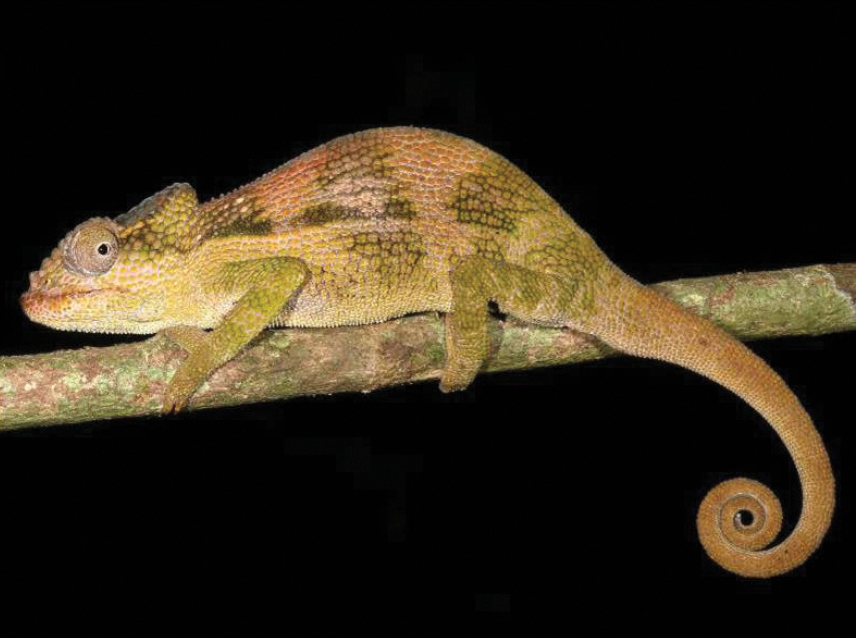
- Nadzikambia baylissi

Scientific classification
- Kingdom: Animalia
- Phylum: Chordata
- Class: Reptilia
- Order: Squamata
- Suborder: Iguania
- Family: Chamaeleonidae
- Subfamily: Chamaeleoninae
- Genus: Nadzikambia; Tilbury, Tolley & Branch, 2006
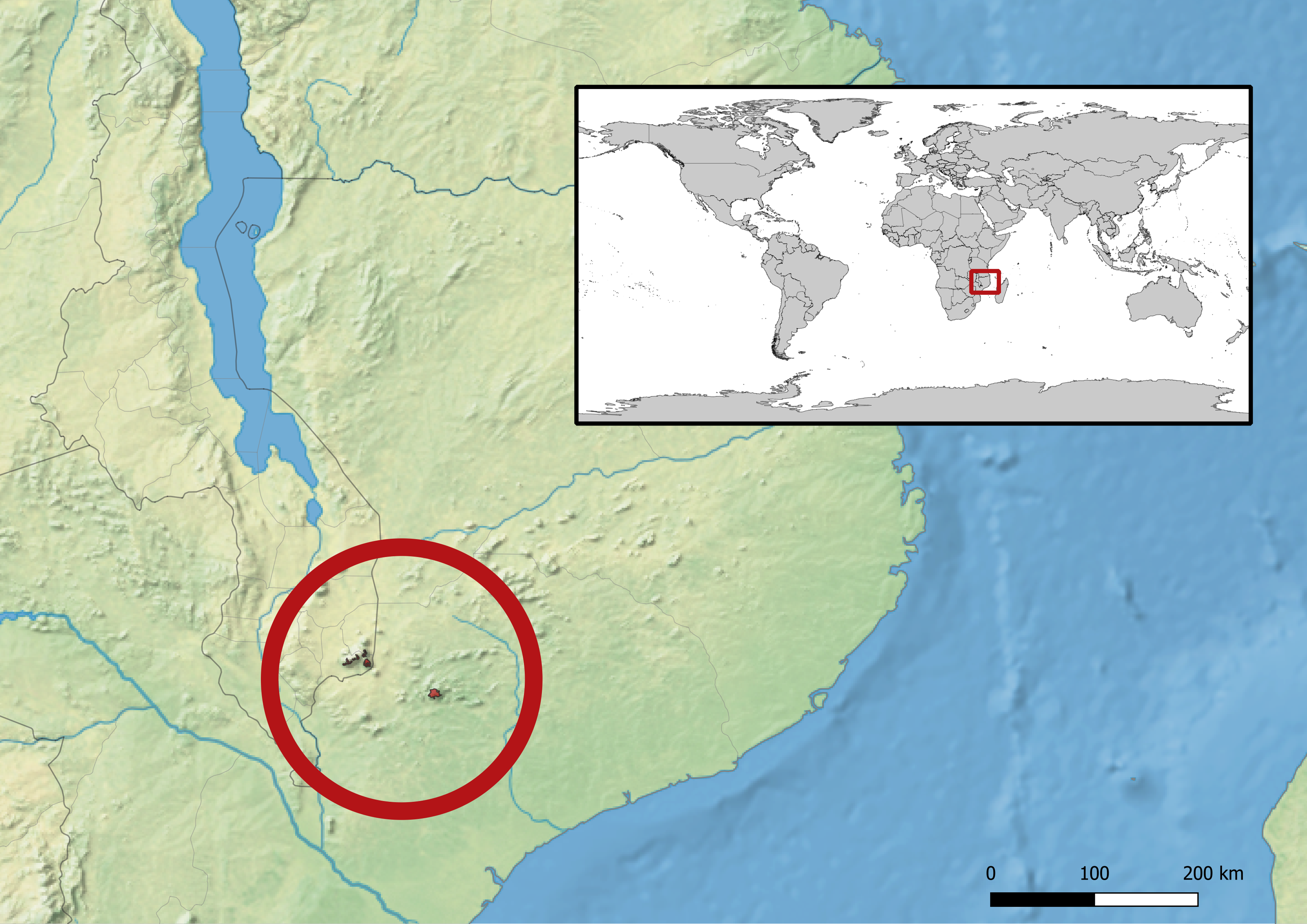

= Nadzikambia =

Genus of lizards

Nadzikambia (derived from their name in Chichewa) is a genus of chameleons. It includes two species of small, plesiomorphic chameleons from the Ruo Gorge forest on Mount Mulanje in Malawi and Mount Mabu in Mozambique.

Initially only a single species was recognized and placed in Chamaeleo. It was for some time moved to the South African dwarf chameleons (Bradypodion) by some (Klaver & Böhme, 1986). This was criticized because plesiomorphies cannot be used to define clades, and eventually turned out to be in error. In 2006, it was moved to its own genus Nadzikambia. In 2010, the second species of Nadzikambia was described.

== Species ==
Image	Scientific name	Common name	Distribution
	Nadzikambia baylissi Branch and Tolley, 2010	Mount Mabu chameleon	Mount Mabu in Mozambique.
	Nadzikambia evanescens		
	Nadzikambia franklinae		
	Nadzikambia goodallae		
	Nadzikambia mlanjensis (Broadley, 1965)	Mlanje Mountain chameleon	Mount Mulanje in Malawi.
	Nadzikambia nubila		
