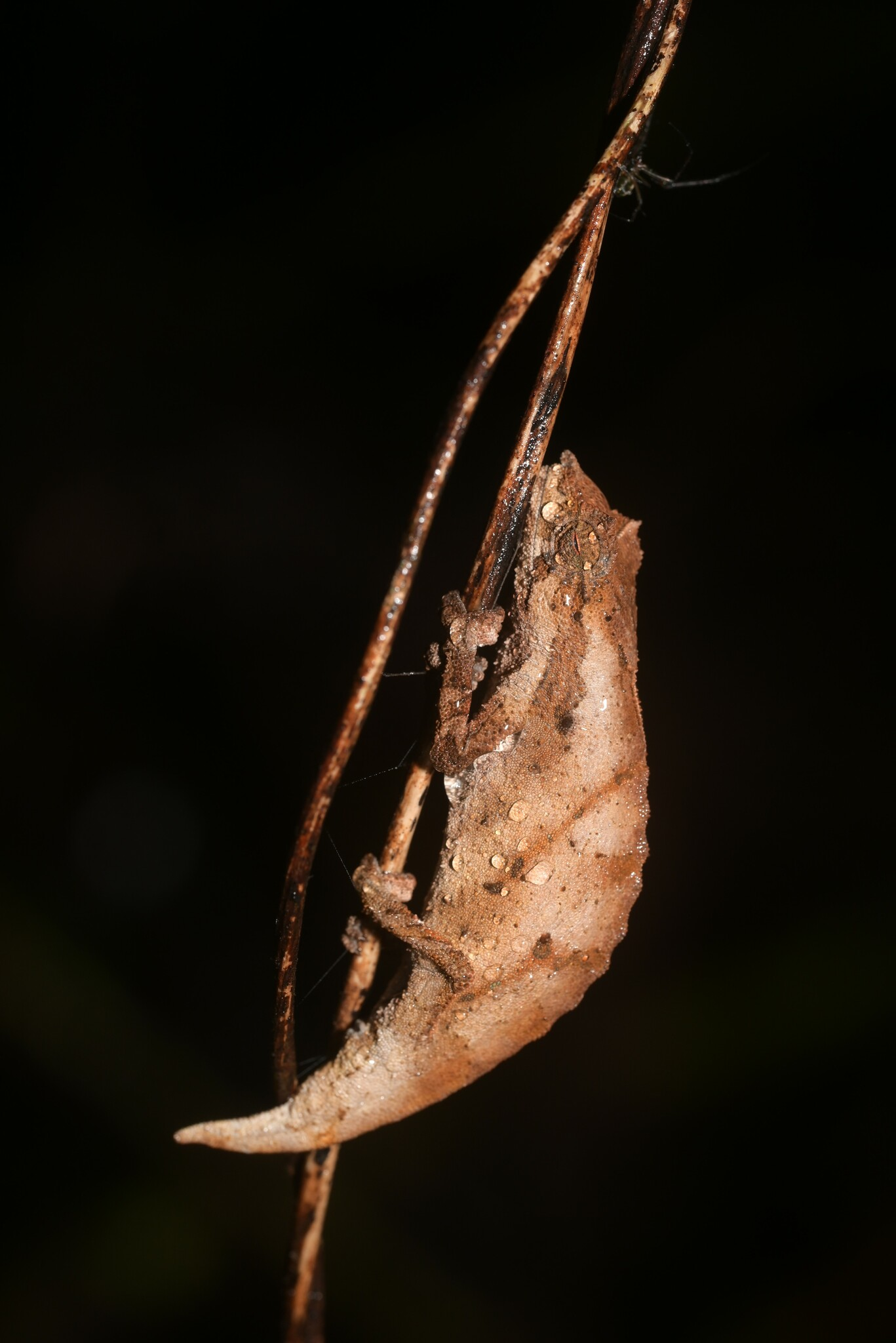
- Nchisi Pitless Pygmy Chameleon (Rhampholeon nchisiensis)

Conservation status
- Least Concern (IUCN 3.1)

Scientific classification
- Kingdom: Animalia
- Phylum: Chordata
- Class: Reptilia
- Order: Squamata
- Suborder: Iguania
- Family: Chamaeleonidae
- Genus: Rhampholeon
- Species: R. nchisiensis

Binomial name
- Rhampholeon nchisiensis Loveridge, 1953)

= Rhampholeon nchisiensis =

Species of lizard

Rhampholeon nchisiensis, the South African stumptail chameleon or Nchisi pygmy chameleon, is a species of chameleon found in Malawi and Tanzania.
