= Rhampholeon boulengeri =

Conservation status
- Least Concern (IUCN 3.1)

Scientific classification
- Kingdom: Animalia
- Phylum: Chordata
- Class: Reptilia
- Order: Squamata
- Suborder: Iguania
- Family: Chamaeleonidae
- Genus: Rhampholeon
- Species: R. boulengeri

Binomial name
- Rhampholeon boulengeri Steindachner, 1911

Species of lizard

Rhampholeon boulengeri, also known commonly as Boulenger's pygmy chameleon, is a species of lizard in the family Chamaeleonidae. The species is native to eastern Africa.

== Etymology ==
The specific name, boulengeri, is in honor of Belgian-born British Herpetologist George Albert Boulenger.

== Geographic range ==
R. boulengeri is found in Burundi, Democratic Republic of Congo, Kenya, Rwanda, Tanzania, and Uganda

== Habitat ==
The preferred natural habitat of R. boulengeri is forest, at elevations up to 2,300 m (7,500 ft).

== Diet ==
R. boulengeri preys on insects, including caterpillars, and also on spiders.

== Reproduction ==
R. boulengeri is oviparous.
