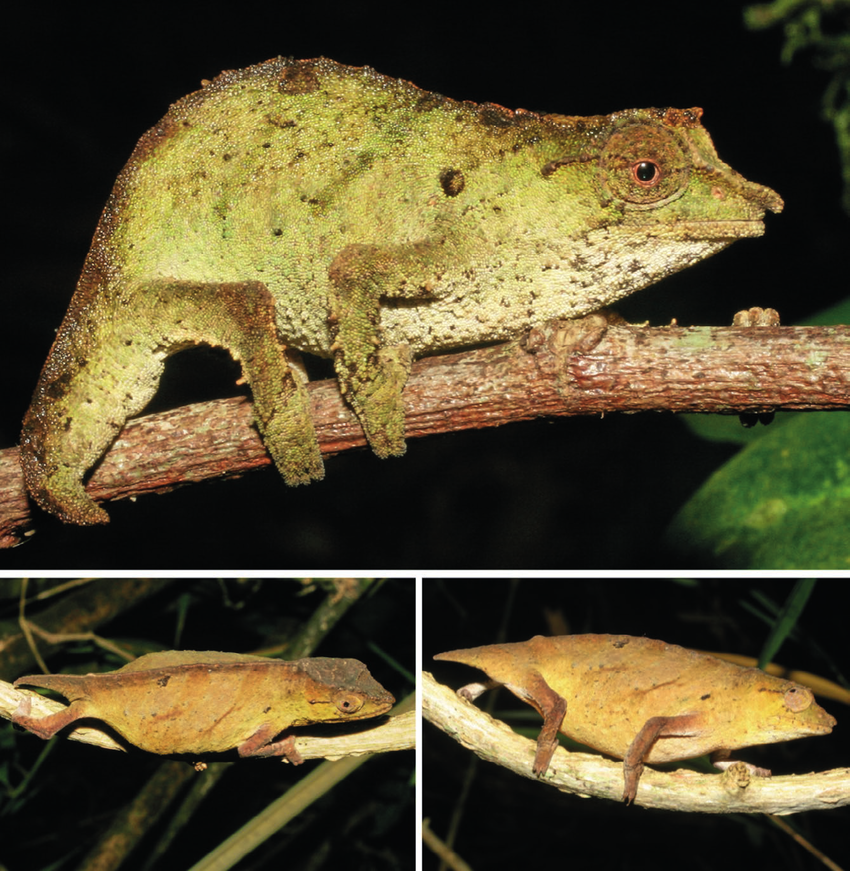

Scientific classification
- Kingdom: Animalia
- Phylum: Chordata
- Class: Reptilia
- Order: Squamata
- Suborder: Iguania
- Family: Chamaeleonidae
- Genus: Rhampholeon
- Species: R. princeeai

Binomial name
- Rhampholeon princeeai Menegon, Lyakurwa, Loader, & Tolley, 2022

= Rhampholeon princeeai =

Rhampholeon Princeeai

Species of lizard

Rhampholeon princeeai, also known commonly as Princeeai's pygmy chameleon, is a species of chameleons endemic to Tanzania.
