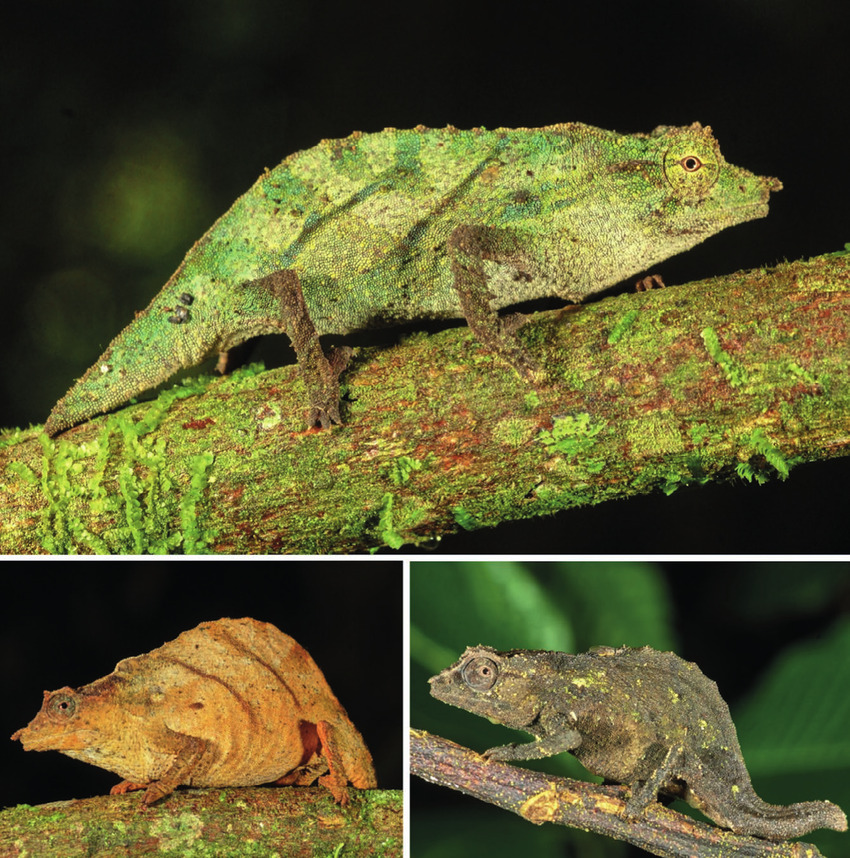

Scientific classification
- Kingdom: Animalia
- Phylum: Chordata
- Class: Reptilia
- Order: Squamata
- Suborder: Iguania
- Family: Chamaeleonidae
- Genus: Rhampholeon
- Species: R. rubeho

Binomial name
- Rhampholeon rubeho Menegon, Lyakurwa, Loader, & Tolley,, 2022

= Rhampholeon rubeho =

Rhampholeon Rubeho

Species of lizard

Rhampholeon rubeho, also known commonly as Rubeho's pygmy chameleon, is a species of lizard in the family Chamaeleonidae endemic to Tanzania.
