= Rhampholeon bruessoworum =

Conservation status
- Critically Endangered (IUCN 3.1)

Scientific classification
- Kingdom: Animalia
- Phylum: Chordata
- Class: Reptilia
- Order: Squamata
- Suborder: Iguania
- Family: Chamaeleonidae
- Genus: Rhampholeon
- Species: R. bruessoworum

Binomial name
- Rhampholeon bruessoworum Branch, Bayliss, & Tolley, 2014

Species of lizard

Rhampholeon bruessoworum, the Mount Inago pygmy chameleon, is a small species of chameleon endemic to Mozambique. It was described in 2014.

== Description ==
Males grow to 56 mm (2.2 in) and females to 62 mm (2.4 in).

== Habitat and conservation ==
Rhampholeon bruessoworum has been found in small patches of wet forest at the base of the Mount Inago granitic inselberg. It is only known from that locality. The wet forests it inhabits are mid-altitude afrotemperate, 1,430–1,480 m (4,690–4,860 ft), with a canopy height primarily 20–30 m (66–98 ft) tall. The lizard occurs in highly fragmented and threatened portions. Its habitat quality is degrading, with pressures from logging for agricultural land and commercial logging operations. Because of its reduced and threatened habitat, it is considered Critically Endangered on the IUCN Red List.
