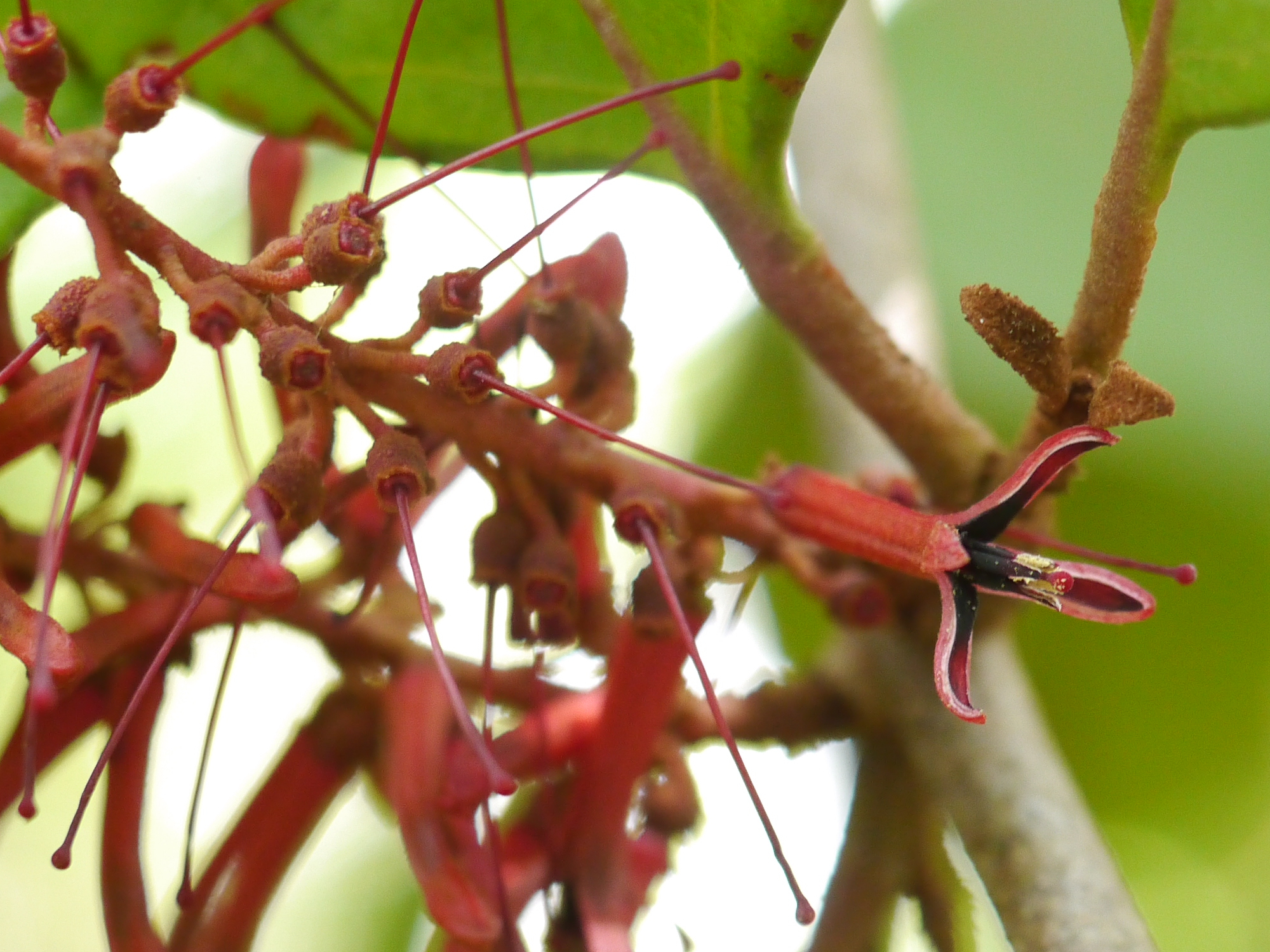
- Helixanthera obtusata

Scientific classification
- Kingdom: Plantae
- Clade: Tracheophytes
- Clade: Angiosperms
- Clade: Eudicots
- Order: Santalales
- Family: Loranthaceae
- Genus: Helixanthera; Lour.

Synonyms
- Acrostachys (Benth.) Tiegh.; Chiridium Tiegh.; Coleobotrys Tiegh.; Dithecina Tiegh.; Helicia Pers.; Lanthorus C.Presl; Leucobotrys Tiegh.; Phoenicanthemum (Blume) Rchb.; Strepsimela Raf.; Sycophila Welw. ex Tiegh.

= Helixanthera =

Genus of mistletoes

Helixanthera is moderately sized genus in the showy mistletoe family, Loranthaceae. It has over 40 species from tropical Africa, southern Asia and Malesia. The genus was described already 1790 by the Portuguese botanist João de Loureiro in his Flora Cochinchinensis. A new species, Helixanthera schizocalyx, was described in 2010.

== Species ==
The Catalogue of Life includes the following species:

- Helixanthera alata
- Helixanthera balansae
- Helixanthera beccarii
- Helixanthera brevicalyx
- Helixanthera cleghornii
- Helixanthera coccinea
- Helixanthera crassipetala
- Helixanthera cylindrica
- Helixanthera ensifolia
- Helixanthera flabellifolia
- Helixanthera garciana
- Helixanthera guangxiensis
- Helixanthera hookeriana
- Helixanthera huillensis
- Helixanthera intermedia
- Helixanthera kirkii
- Helixanthera lambertiana
- Helixanthera lepidophylla
- Helixanthera ligustrina
- Helixanthera mannii
- Helixanthera maxwelliana
- Helixanthera obtusata
- Helixanthera odorata
- Helixanthera parasitica
- Helixanthera parishii
- Helixanthera periclymenoides
- Helixanthera pierrei
- Helixanthera pulchra
- Helixanthera sampsonii
- Helixanthera schizocalyx
- Helixanthera scoriarum
- Helixanthera sessiliflora
- Helixanthera setigera
- Helixanthera spathulata
- Helixanthera spicata
- Helixanthera subalata
- Helixanthera subligustrina
- Helixanthera terrestris
- Helixanthera tetrapartita
- Helixanthera thomsonii
- Helixanthera wallichiana
- Helixanthera verruculosa
- Helixanthera woodii
