= Rhampholeon viridis =

Conservation status
- Endangered (IUCN 3.1)

Scientific classification
- Kingdom: Animalia
- Phylum: Chordata
- Class: Reptilia
- Order: Squamata
- Suborder: Iguania
- Family: Chamaeleonidae
- Genus: Rhampholeon
- Species: R. viridis

Binomial name
- Rhampholeon viridis Mariaux & Tilbury, 2006

Species of lizard

Rhampholeon viridis, the green pygmy chameleon, is a species of chameleons endemic to Tanzania.

Higher Taxa: Chamaeleonidae, Sauria, Squamata (lizards)

Common Names: Green Pygmy Chameleon

Distribution: Tanzania (South Pare Mountains)

Type Locality: Tanga region, South Pare Mountains, from a patch of forest next to the Hingili stream, just north of the Shengena Mountain FR [4°14' 50" S, 37°59'28" E], 1450 m elevation.

Etymology: The specific name derives from Latin "viridis" meaning "green," referring to the rich green coloration observed in males.
