= Mount Mabu =

Mountain in Mozambique

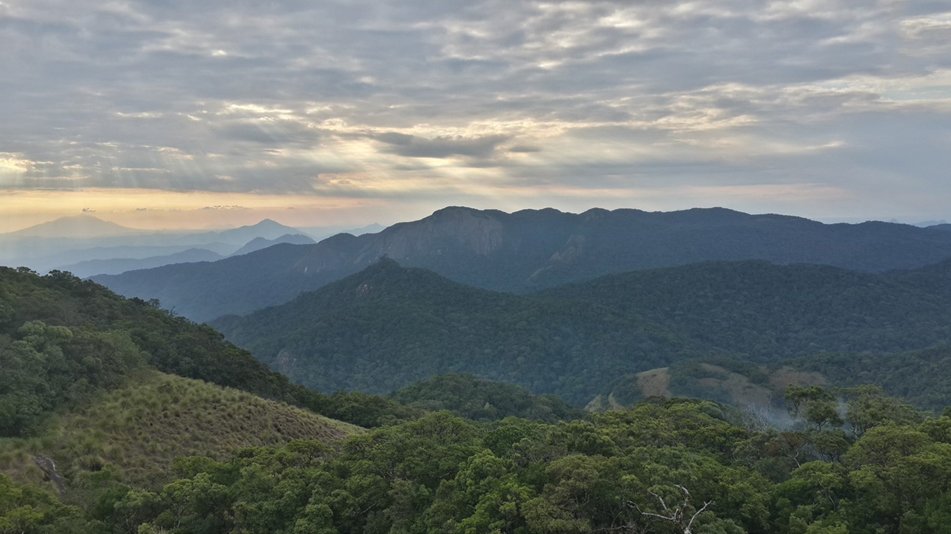

Highest point
- Elevation: 1,700 m (5,600 ft)
- Coordinates: 16°17′52″S 36°23′39″E

Naming
- Language of name: Portuguese

Geography
- Location within Mozambique
- Location: Mozambique

Mount Mabu is a mountain in northern Mozambique, famous for its old-growth rain forest. Mount Mabu is approximately 1,700 metres (5,600 feet) high and the forest covers about 7,000 hectares (17,000 acres; 27 square miles). While well-known locally, the Mount Mabu forest and its extremely diverse flora and fauna were virtually unknown to science until 2005, when the location was finally visited by a team of researchers from the Mulanje Mountain Conservation Trust (MMCT), along with several ornithologists, and, in 2008, by scientists from Kew Royal Botanic Gardens. The scientific expeditions were made possible by finding the mountain's location on Google Earth's satellite-view, looking for potentially unknown wildlife hotspots in Africa. Thus, Mount Mabu is frequently referred to as the "Google Forest". It forms part of a proposed ecoregion to be called the "Southeast Africa Montane Archipelago" (SEAMA).

== Habitations ==
There are communities living around Mount Mabu, the closest being Nangaze, Nvava, and Limbue. The mountain plays a crucial role in the lives of the communities and, in the cosmology of the Nangaze leader, Mount Mabu belongs to a kinship network in which Mabu is the oldest brother, Mount Muriba is the youngest brother and River Mugue is the middle sister. Local narratives state that the first leaders of the Nvava or the Nangaze community after they died their spirits flew to the mountain.

Currently, there are two Mozambican NGOs working with the communities to turn Mount Mabu into a conservation area, namely, Justica Ambiental and RADEZA. These NGOs created associations to protect Mount Mabu in different communities. JA created associations in Nangaze, Nvava, Namadoe and Limbue. RADEZA created committees for natural resources management in the four communities mentioned and six more. RADEZA in association with ITC (Iniciativa de Terras Privadas) persuaded the government to provide community land titles – DUAT. Up to the present time, there is no formal conservation of Mabu. However, the associations "control" access to the mountain and forest.

== Species ==
Among 126 species of birds identified in the forest; there were seven newly discovered populations of globally threatened species of birds, including the Thyolo alethe (Alethe choloensis), whose other populations are all threatened by logging and deforestation. Others include Swynnerton's robin (Swynnertonia swynnertoni) and the Namuli apalis (Apalis lynesi).

Several new species have been discovered in the Mount Mabu forest. The high isolation of the area, surrounded by savanna, makes it likely that it is host to many more previously unknown species. Named species so far include:

- Helixanthera schizocalyx, a tropical mistletoe in the family Loranthaceae. It is a hairless, parasitic shrub that attaches to tree branches, growing up to 50 cm (1.6 ft) high.
- Nadzikambia baylissi, a chameleon. It is only the second species described in what was, previously, a monotypic genus, Nadzikambia.
- Rhinolophus mabuensis, the Mount Mabu horseshoe bat.
- Atheris mabuensis, a bush viper.
- Dipsadoboa montisilva, a tree snake.
- Rhampholeon maspictus, a pygmy chameleon.
- Cymothoe baylissi, a butterfly.
- Epamera malaikae, a butterfly.
- Leptomyrina congdoni, a butterfly.

There are likely many more new species in the forest, with likely candidates so far including a shrew, a pseudo-scorpion, frogs, snails, bats, catfish, and various insects.

=== Conservation ===
In June 2009, the Mozambique government announced that they would establish conservation measures to prevent commercial logging. The Mabu forest is believed to be the largest medium-elevation rainforest in Africa. African forests that are unspoiled by logging and other human activity are rare. The Mount Mabu forest is surrounded by areas devastated by the Mozambican Civil War (1977–1992). Poor road access, and its use as a refuge for local villagers during the war, contributed to its protection. No records of previous expeditions or collecting-trips have been noted.

== See also ==
- Afromontane
- Mount Lico
