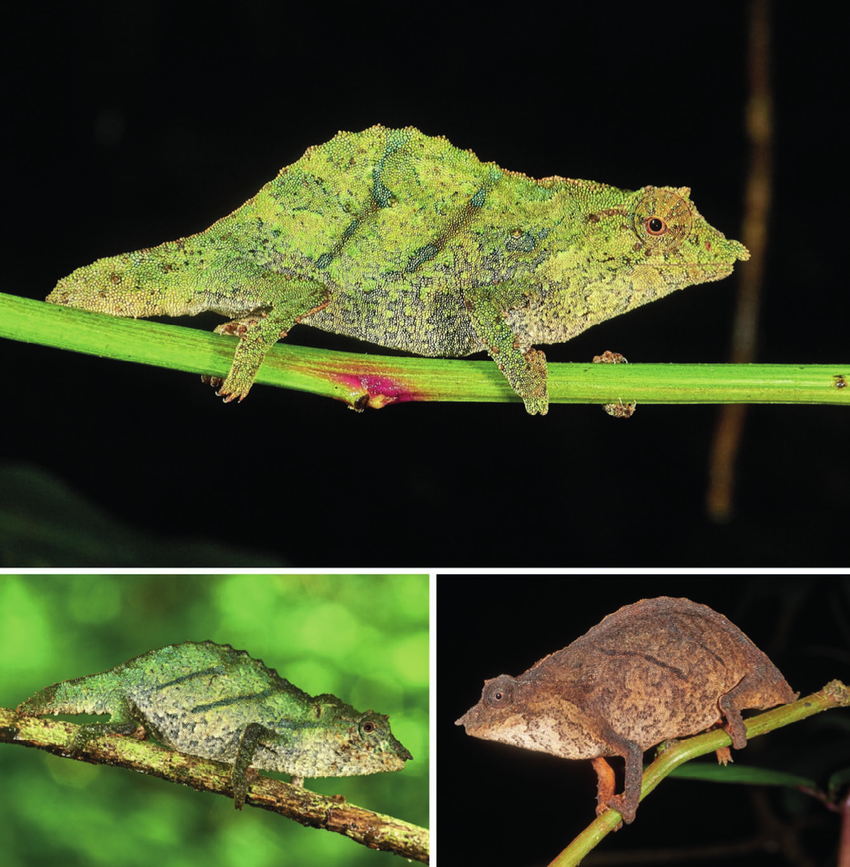

Scientific classification
- Kingdom: Animalia
- Phylum: Chordata
- Class: Reptilia
- Order: Squamata
- Suborder: Iguania
- Family: Chamaeleonidae
- Genus: Rhampholeon
- Species: R. nicolai

Binomial name
- Rhampholeon nicolai Menegon, Lyakurwa, Loader, & Tolley,, 2022

= Rhampholeon nicolai =

Rhampholeon Nicolai

Species of lizard

Rhampholeon nicolai, also known commonly as Nicola's pygmy chameleon, is a species of chameleons endemic to Tanzania.
