= Mlanje Mountain chameleon =

Conservation status
- Endangered (IUCN 3.1)

Scientific classification
- Kingdom: Animalia
- Phylum: Chordata
- Class: Reptilia
- Order: Squamata
- Suborder: Iguania
- Family: Chamaeleonidae
- Genus: Nadzikambia
- Species: N. mlanjensis

Binomial name
- Nadzikambia mlanjensis (Broadley, 1965)
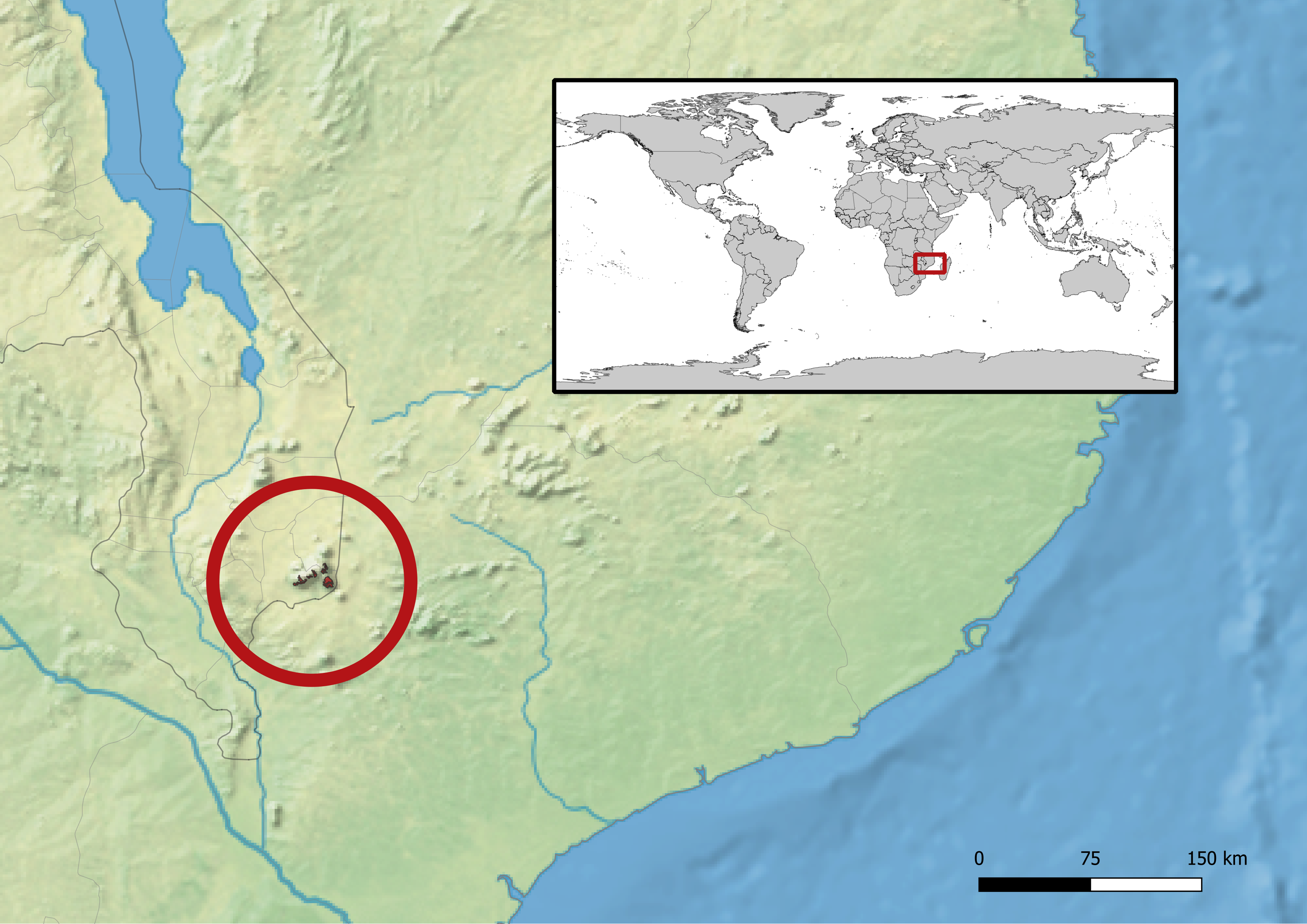

Synonyms
- Bradypodion mlanjense; Chamaeleo mlanjense; Nadzikambia mlanjense

Species of lizard

The Mlanje Mountain chameleon (Nadzikambia mlanjensis) is one of two species in the genus Nadzikambia (derived from the species' name in Chichewa). It is a plesiomorphic, small chameleon from the Ruo Gorge forest on Mount Mulanje in Malawi.

Initially placed into Chamaeleo, it was for some time moved to the South African dwarf chameleons (Bradypodion) by some (Klaver & Böhme, 1986). This was criticized because plesiomorphies cannot be used to define clades, and eventually turned out to be in error.
