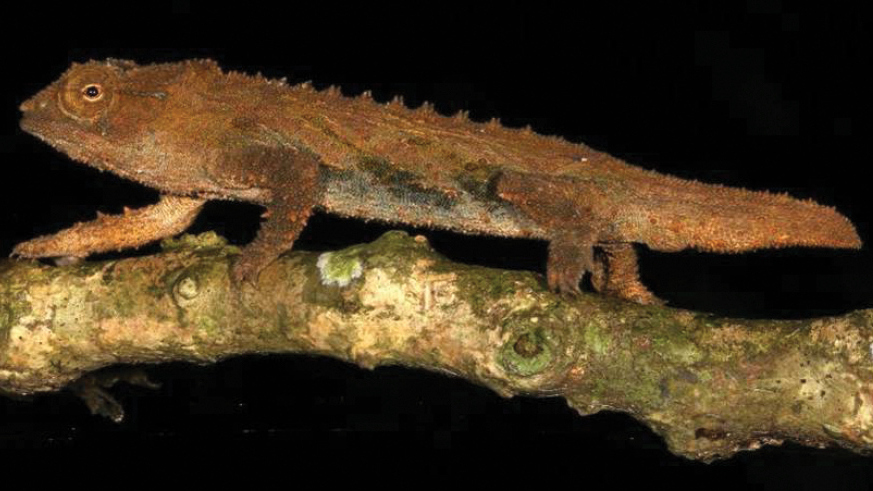

Conservation status
- Endangered (IUCN 3.1)

Scientific classification
- Kingdom: Animalia
- Phylum: Chordata
- Class: Reptilia
- Order: Squamata
- Suborder: Iguania
- Family: Chamaeleonidae
- Genus: Rhampholeon
- Species: R. tilburyi

Binomial name
- Rhampholeon tilburyi Branch, Bayliss, & Tolley, 2014

= Rhampholeon tilburyi =

Species of lizard

Rhampholeon tilburyi, the Mount Namuli pygmy chameleon, is a small species of chameleon endemic to Mozambique.
