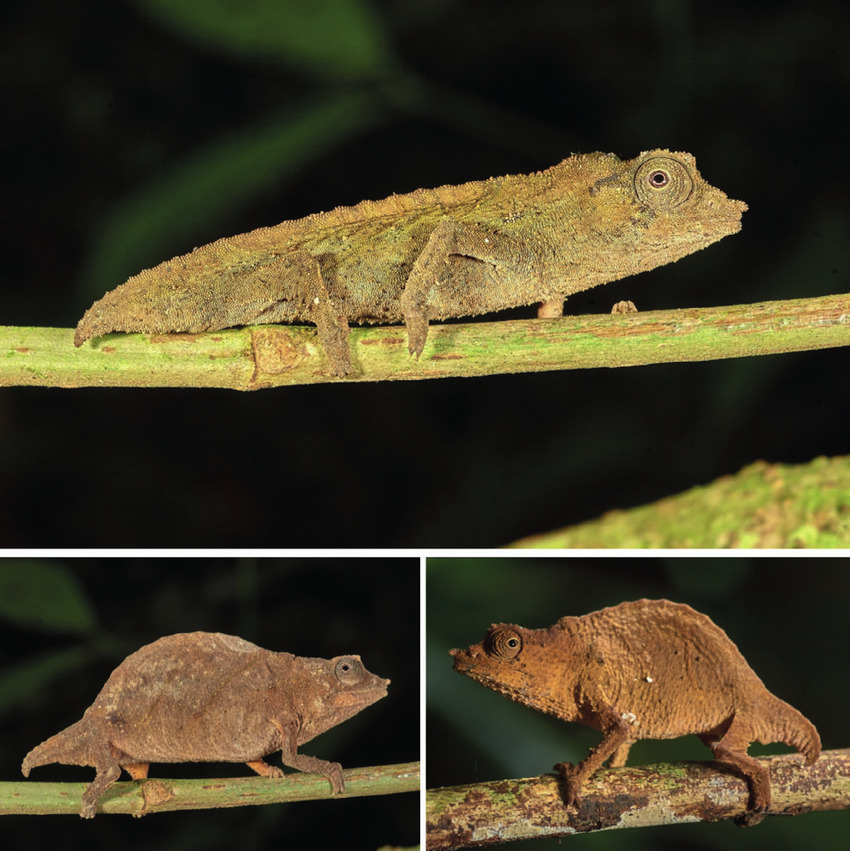

Scientific classification
- Kingdom: Animalia
- Phylum: Chordata
- Class: Reptilia
- Order: Squamata
- Suborder: Iguania
- Family: Chamaeleonidae
- Genus: Rhampholeon
- Species: R. sabini

Binomial name
- Rhampholeon sabini Menegon, Lyakurwa, Loader, & Tolley,, 2022

= Rhampholeon sabini =

Rhampholeon Sabini

Species of lizard

Rhampholeon sabini, also known commonly as the Nguu North pygmy chameleon, is a species of chameleons endemic to Tanzania.
