= Mount Lico =

Mountain in Mozambique

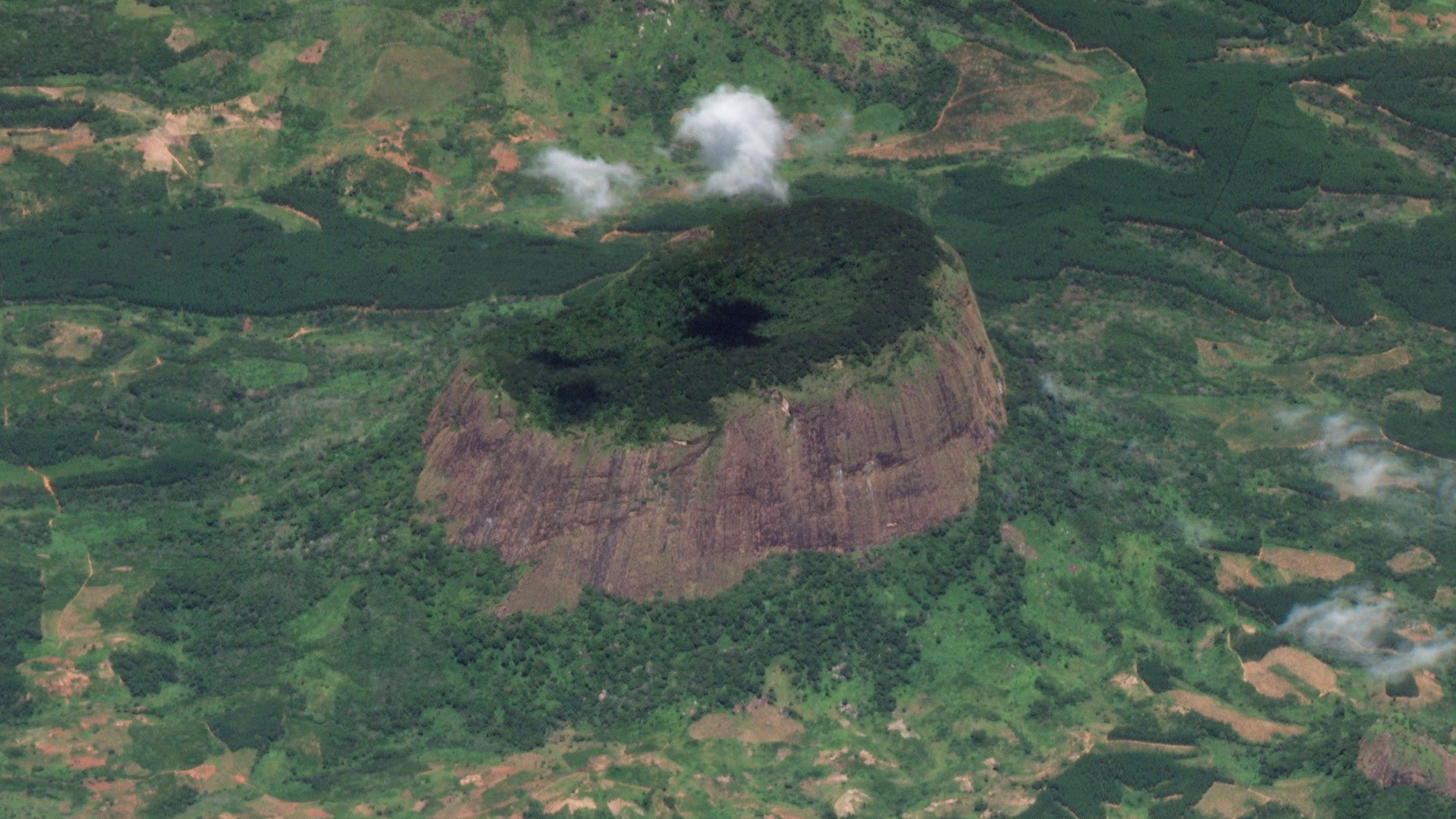
- Satellite image of Mount Lico, taken March 2020 by a SkySat satellite

Highest point
- Elevation: 1,100 m (3,600 ft)
- Coordinates: 15°47′27″S 37°21′46″E

Naming
- Language of name: Portuguese

Geography
- Location within Mozambique
- Location: Mozambique

Climbing
- First ascent: May 2018

Mount Lico is an inselberg mountain in the Alto Molocue District of Zambezia Province in northern Mozambique, most notable for its old-growth rainforest and its minimal penetration by humans. Mount Lico is approximately 1,100 metres (3,600 feet) above sea level but is distinctive in having sheer rock walls of up to 700 metres (2,300 feet) above the surrounding countryside that have all but prevented human intrusion. The forest on top, within a volcanic crater, covers only about 30 hectares (74 acres).

In 2012, Mount Lico was identified as a place of special scientific interest by Julian Bayliss of Oxford Brookes University, who had earlier similarly identified Mount Mabu some 70 kilometres (43 miles) southwest, by using Google Earth to search for significant landforms and vegetation features.

In May 2018, Bayliss led a multidisciplinary expedition to scale the sheer walls of Mount Lico and begin the study of its unique habitat. Although it had been considered unlikely that humans would have entered the mountain's forest prior to this expedition, evidence was discovered in the form of several pots which had been placed, possibly for religious reasons, at the source of a stream on the mountain top.

== See also ==
- Afromontane
- Mount Mabu
