= Rhampholeon nebulauctor =

Conservation status
- Vulnerable (IUCN 3.1)

Scientific classification
- Kingdom: Animalia
- Phylum: Chordata
- Class: Reptilia
- Order: Squamata
- Suborder: Iguania
- Family: Chamaeleonidae
- Genus: Rhampholeon
- Species: R. nebulauctor

Binomial name
- Rhampholeon nebulauctor Branch, Bayliss, & Tolley, 2014

Species of lizard

Rhampholeon nebulauctor, the Mount Chiperone pygmy chameleon, is a small species of chameleon. It is endemic to Mount Chiperone in Mozambique.
