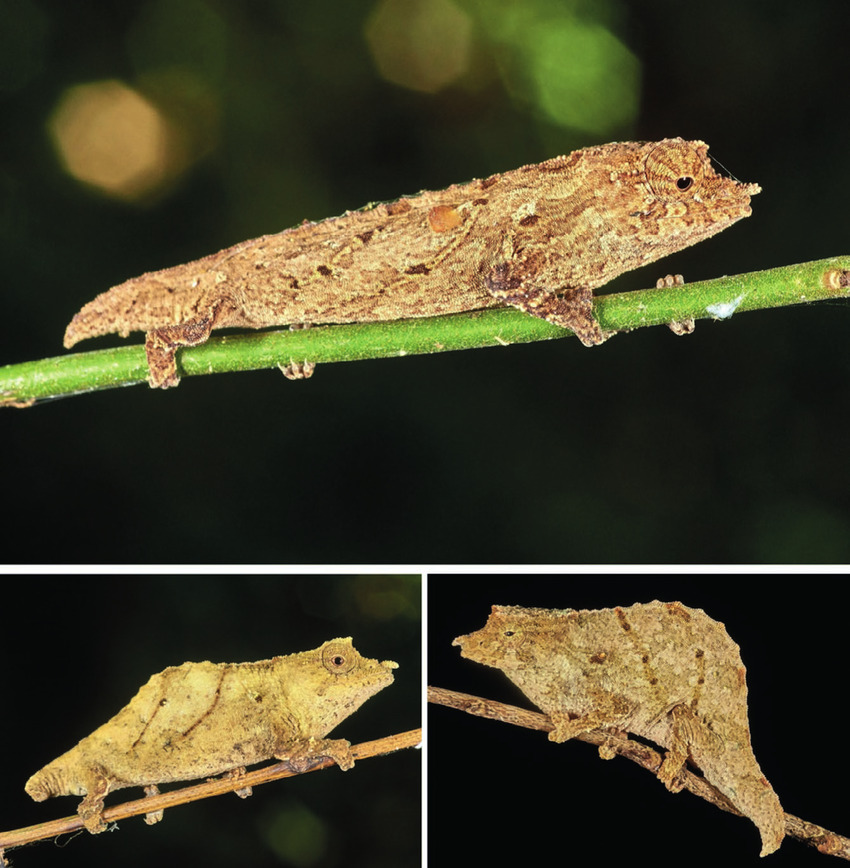

Scientific classification
- Kingdom: Animalia
- Phylum: Chordata
- Class: Reptilia
- Order: Squamata
- Suborder: Iguania
- Family: Chamaeleonidae
- Genus: Rhampholeon
- Species: R. colemani

Binomial name
- Rhampholeon colemani Menegon, Lyakurwa, Loader, & Tolley,, 2022

= Rhampholeon colemani =

Rhampholeon Colemani

Species of lizard

Rhampholeon colemani is a species of lizard in the family Chamaeleonidae. The species is endemic to Tanzania.

Higher Taxa: Chamaeleonidae, Sauria, Squamata (lizards)

Distribution: Tanzania

Type Locality: Kitolomero Valley, a locality in the Uzungwa Scarp Nature Reserve at about 1200 m a.s.l. (-8.3975; 35.9786) Kilombero District, Morogoro Region of Tanzania.

Etymology: Rhampholeon colemani is named in honor of Carter Coleman, who has been actively involved in fundraising and conservation efforts for Tanzania's forests. For over 25 years, Coleman has played a crucial role in initiatives such as reviving the Tanzania Forest Conservation Group in 1991 and establishing the African Rainforest Conservancy in the USA and the African Rainforest Trust in the United Kingdom. These organizations remain dedicated to conserving Tanzania's high biodiversity forests.
