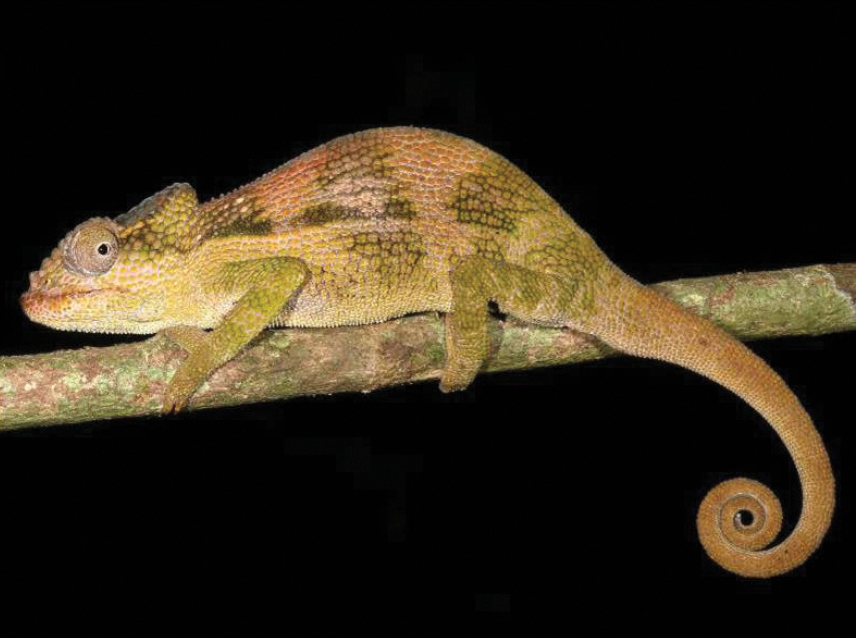

Conservation status
- Near Threatened (IUCN 3.1)

Scientific classification
- Kingdom: Animalia
- Phylum: Chordata
- Class: Reptilia
- Order: Squamata
- Suborder: Iguania
- Family: Chamaeleonidae
- Genus: Nadzikambia
- Species: N. baylissi

Binomial name
- Nadzikambia baylissi Branch and Tolley, 2010
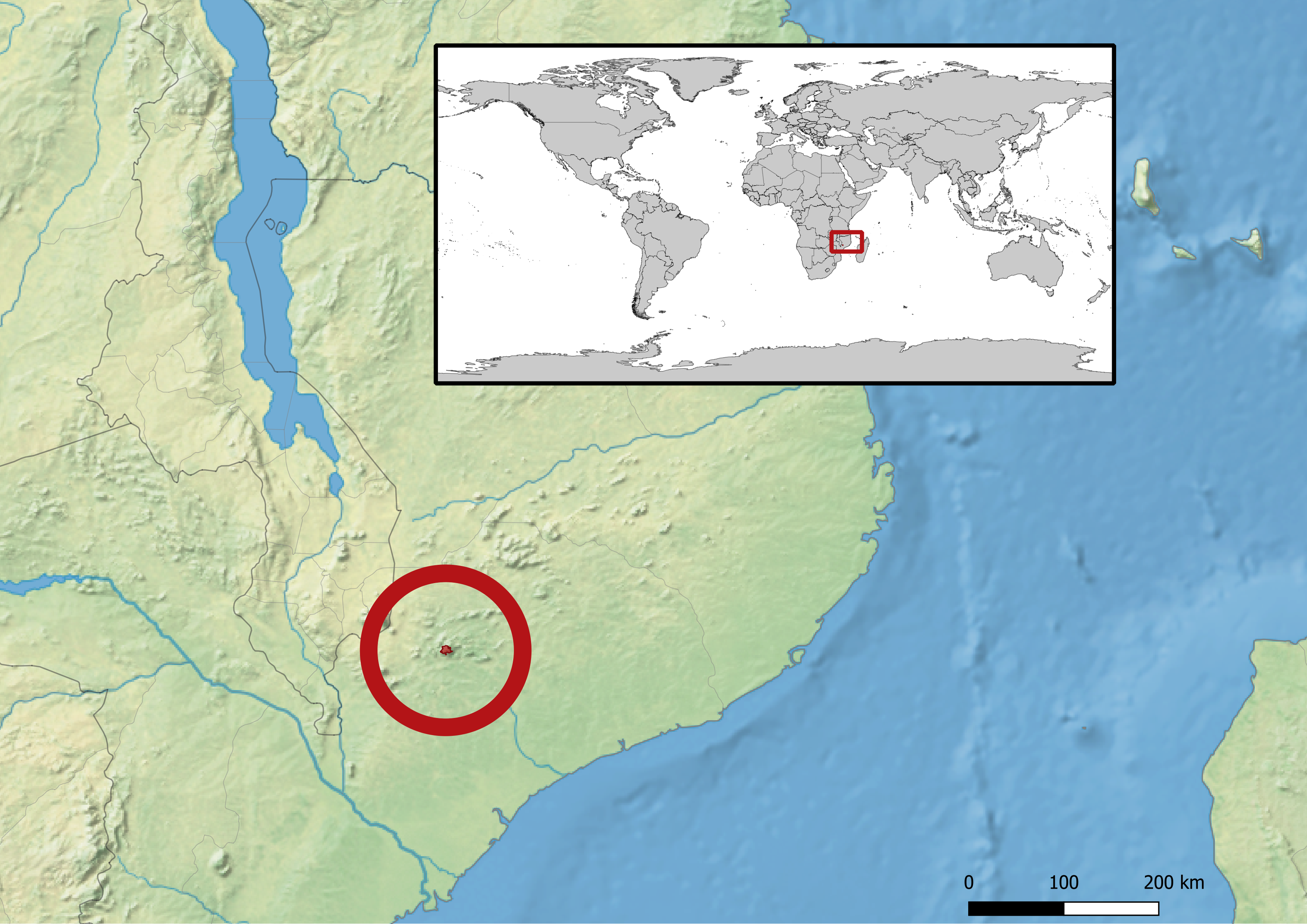

= Mount Mabu chameleon =

Species of lizard

The Mount Mabu chameleon (Nadzikambia baylissi) is one of two species in the genus Nadzikambia (derived from the species' name in Chichewa). It is a small chameleon from Mount Mabu in Mozambique.
