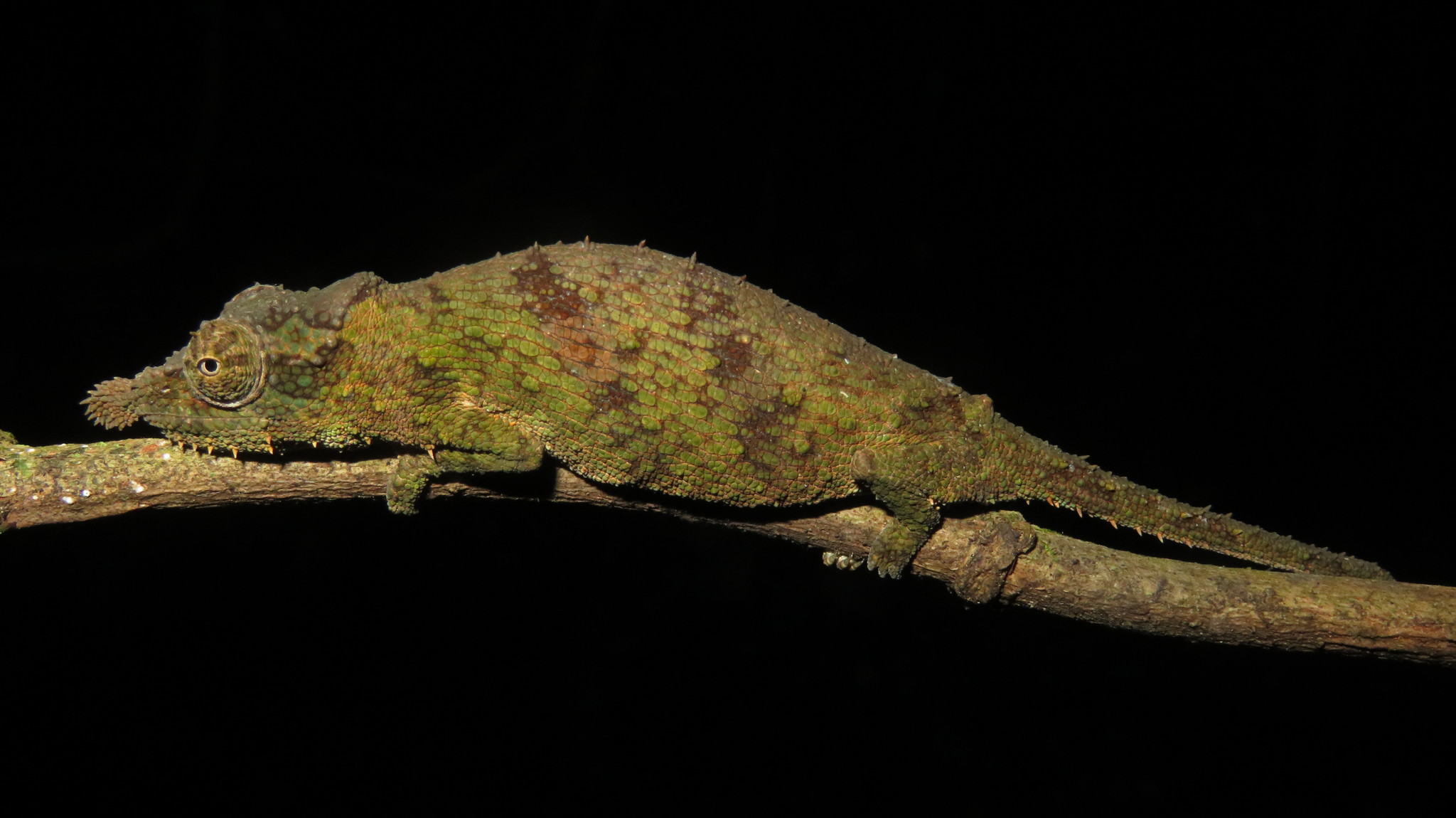

Conservation status
- Endangered (IUCN 3.1)

Scientific classification
- Kingdom: Animalia
- Phylum: Chordata
- Class: Reptilia
- Order: Squamata
- Suborder: Iguania
- Family: Chamaeleonidae
- Genus: Rhampholeon
- Species: R. spinosus

Binomial name
- Rhampholeon spinosus (Matschie, 1892)
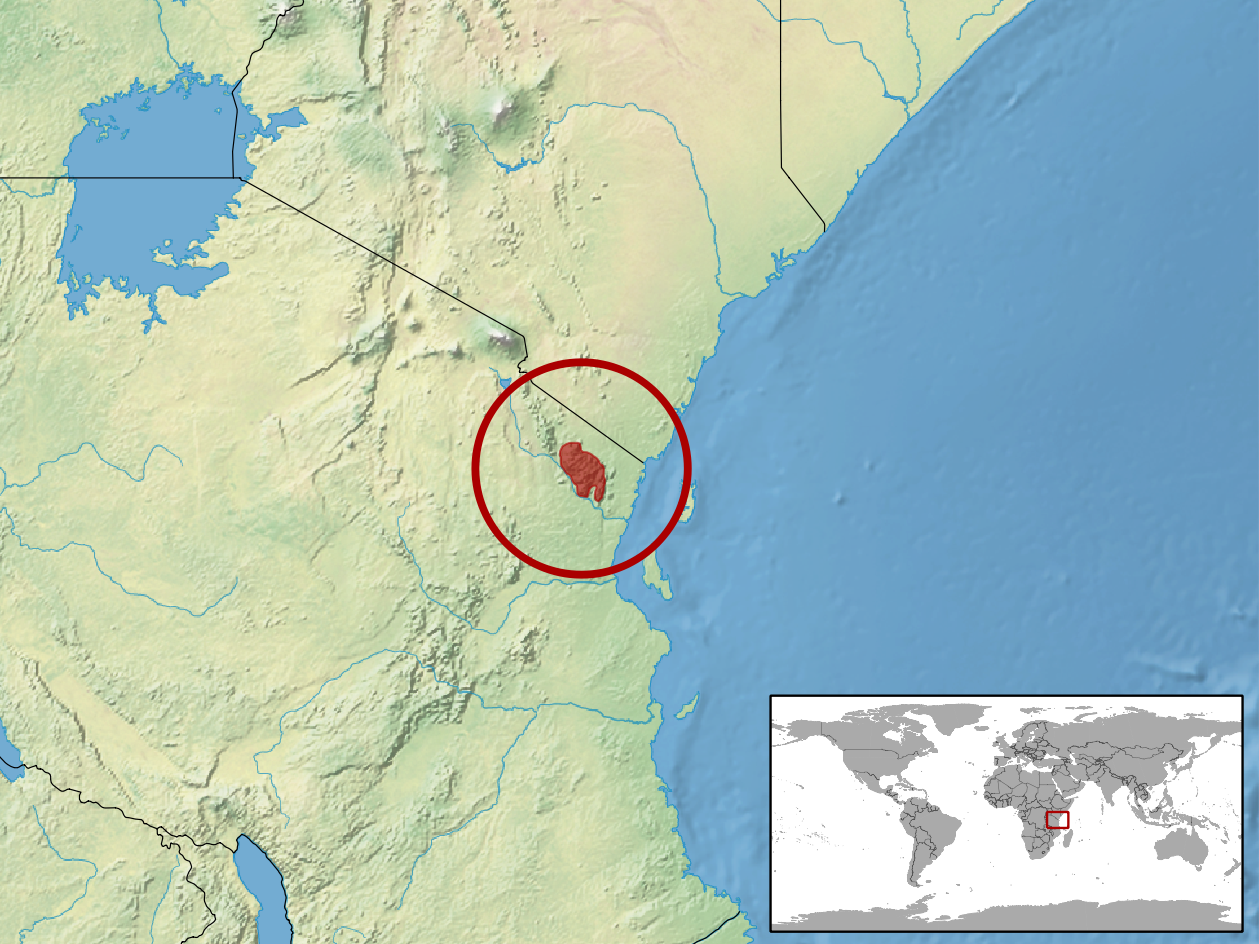

Synonyms
- Chamaeleo spinosum Bradypodion spinosum

= Rosette-nosed chameleon =

Species of lizard

The rosette-nosed chameleon (Rhampholeon spinosus) is a small species of chameleon found in virgin forest and woodland of both the eastern and western Usambara Mountains in Tanzania. This endangered species is predominantly ash-grey in colouration, with a distinctive rosette-like nasal appendage.
