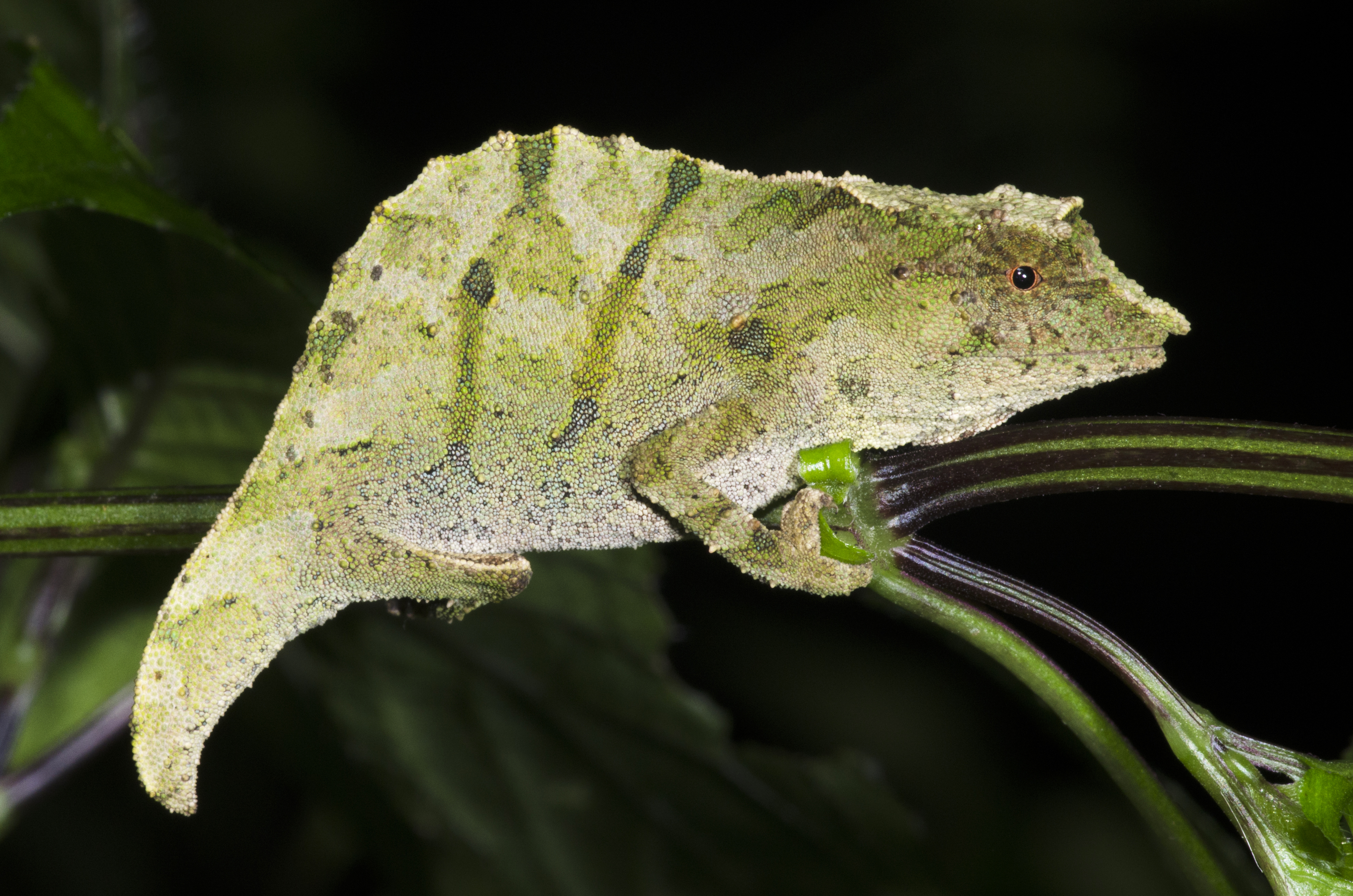

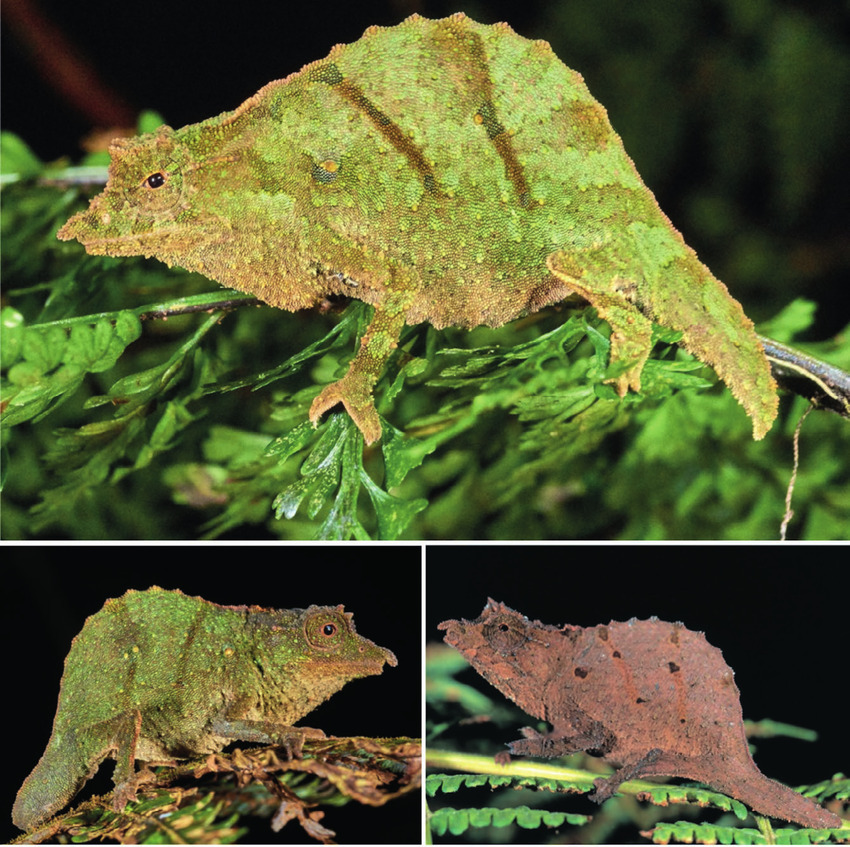

Conservation status
- Vulnerable (IUCN 3.1)

Scientific classification
- Kingdom: Animalia
- Phylum: Chordata
- Class: Reptilia
- Order: Squamata
- Suborder: Iguania
- Family: Chamaeleonidae
- Genus: Rhampholeon
- Species: R. moyeri

Binomial name
- Rhampholeon moyeri Menegon, Salvidio & Tilbury, 2002

= Rhampholeon moyeri =

Species of lizard

Rhampholeon moyeri, also known commonly as Moyer's pygmy chameleon and the Udzungwa pygmy chameleon, is a species of lizard in the family Chamaeleonidae. The species is endemic to Tanzania.

== Taxonomy ==
Rhampholeon moyeri is currently thought to be paraphyletic because some populations of chameleons, including some at the Uzungwa Scarp Nature Reserve, consist of separate clades that could represent different species (Matthee et al., 2004; Fisseha et al., 2013).

== Geographic distribution ==
Rhampholeon moyeri is found in the Udzungwa Mountains of Tanzania.

Type locality: Kihanga Valley, Uzungwa Scarp Forest Reserve (Luhega), Udzungwa Mountains, SE Tanzania.

== Habitat ==
The natural habitat of Rhampholeon moyeri is forest, which has not been degraded or transformed, at elevations of 1,000–2,000 m (3,300–6,600 ft).

== Behavior ==
Rhampholeon moyeri is terrestrial and diurnal. By day it actively forages in the leaf litter of the forest. It climbs vegetation to find a perch to sleep at night.

== Reproduction ==
Rhampholeon moyeri is oviparous.

== Etymology ==
Rhampholeon moyeri is named after zoologist David C. Moyer, who collected the first known specimen.

== Description ==
The maximum total length (tail included) of Rhampholeon moyeri is 64 mm (2.5 in) for females, 51 mm (2.0 in) for males.
