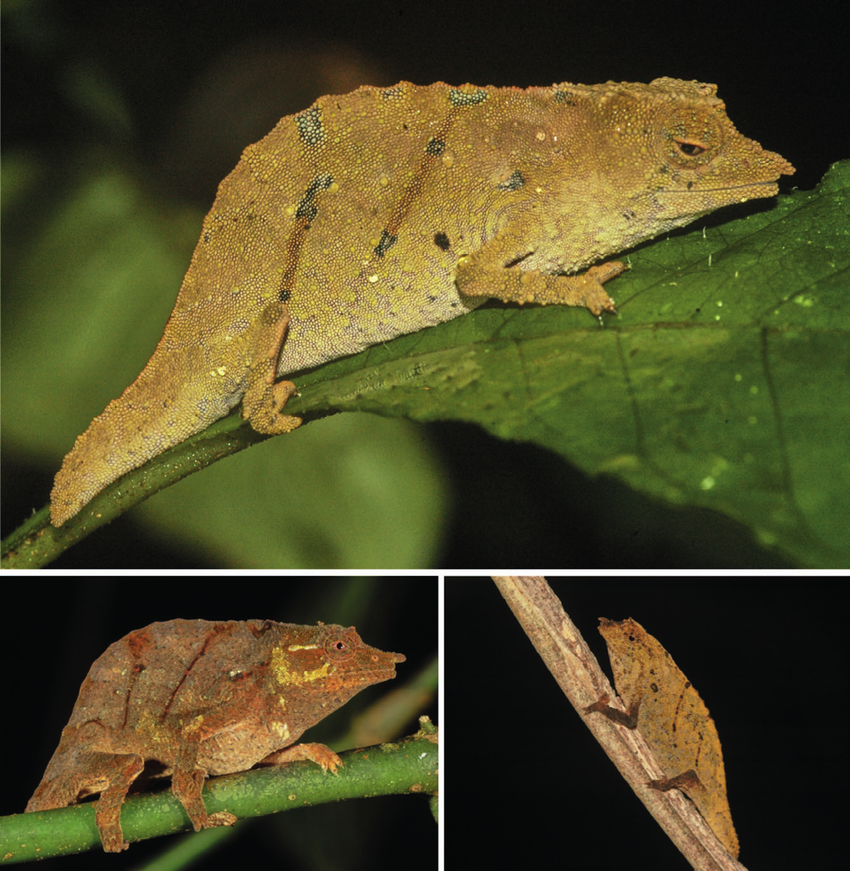

Scientific classification
- Kingdom: Animalia
- Phylum: Chordata
- Class: Reptilia
- Order: Squamata
- Suborder: Iguania
- Family: Chamaeleonidae
- Genus: Rhampholeon
- Species: R. waynelotteri

Binomial name
- Rhampholeon waynelotteri Menegon, Lyakurwa, Loader, & Tolley, 2022

= Rhampholeon waynelotteri =

Rhampholeon Waynelotteri

Species of lizard

Rhampholeon waynelotteri is a species of chameleons. It is endemic to the Nguru Mountains, Tanzania.
