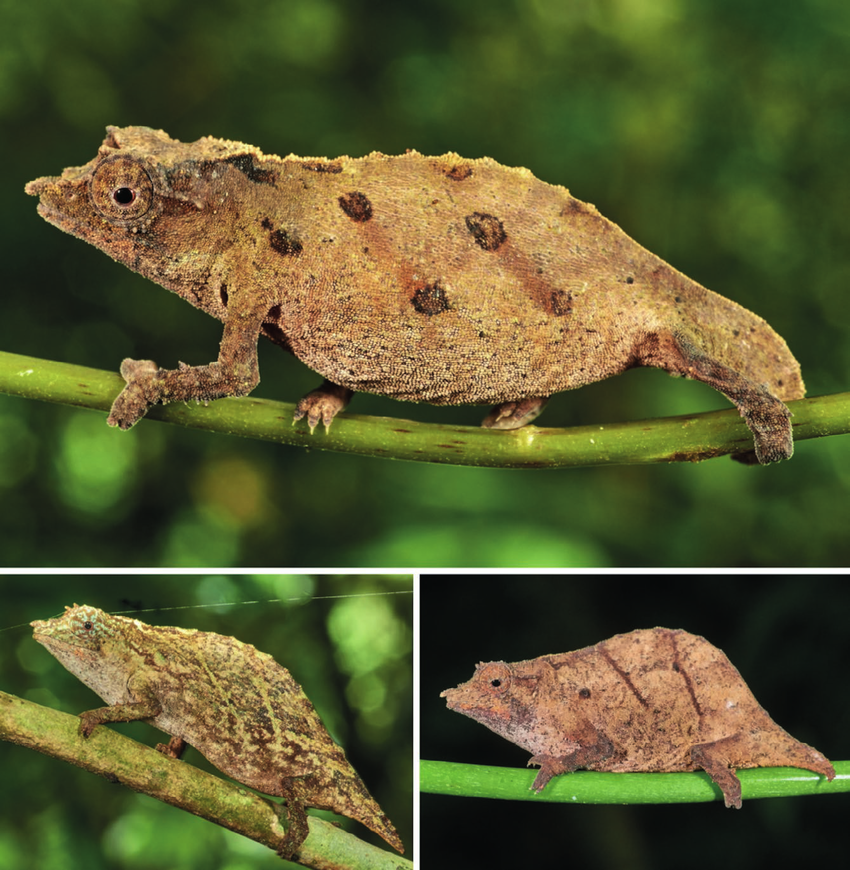

Conservation status
- Endangered (IUCN 3.1)

Scientific classification
- Kingdom: Animalia
- Phylum: Chordata
- Class: Reptilia
- Order: Squamata
- Suborder: Iguania
- Family: Chamaeleonidae
- Genus: Rhampholeon
- Species: R. uluguruensis

Binomial name
- Rhampholeon uluguruensis Tilbury & Emmrich, 1996

= Rhampholeon uluguruensis =

Species of lizard

Rhampholeon uluguruensis, also known commonly as the Uluguru pygmy chameleon, is a small species of chameleon in the family Chamaeleonidae, endemic to Tanzania.
