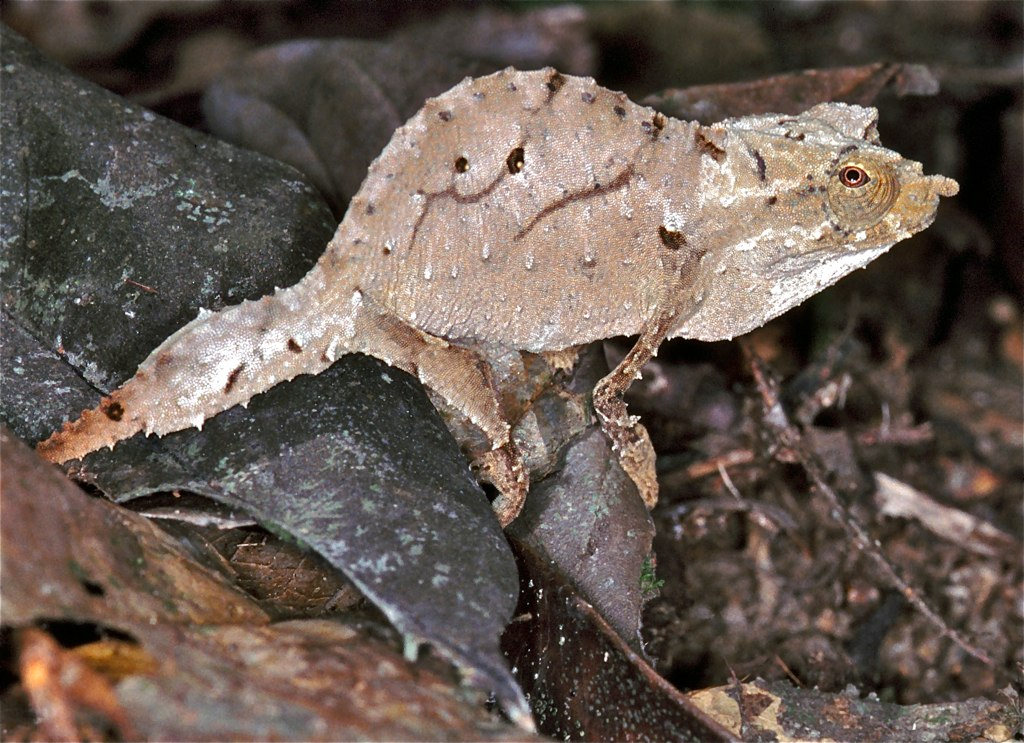
- Rhampholeon spectrum

Conservation status
- Least Concern (IUCN 3.1)

Scientific classification
- Kingdom: Animalia
- Phylum: Chordata
- Class: Reptilia
- Order: Squamata
- Suborder: Iguania
- Family: Chamaeleonidae
- Genus: Rhampholeon
- Species: R. spectrum

Binomial name
- Rhampholeon spectrum Buchholz, 1874
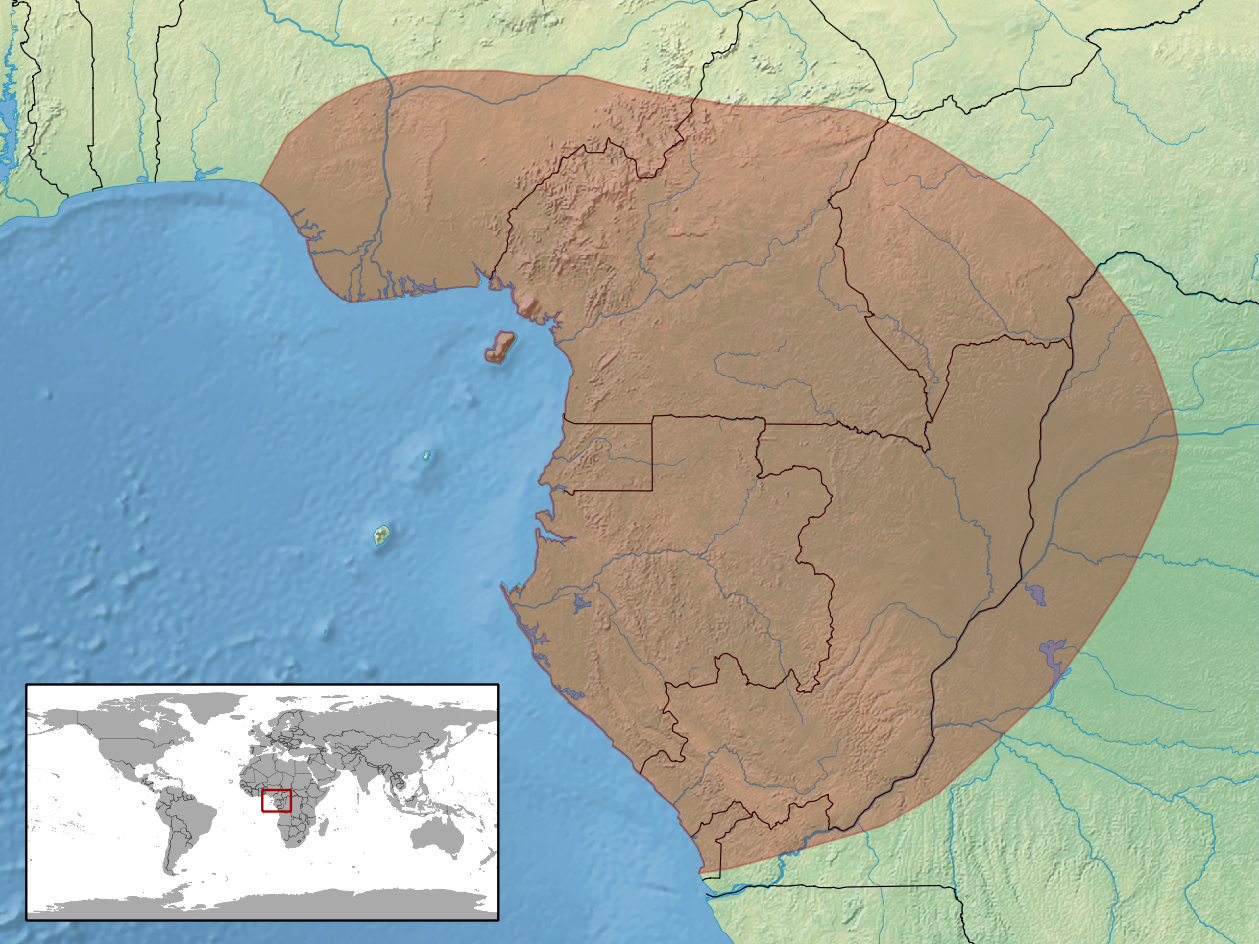

Synonyms
- Chamaeleo spectrum Buchholz, 1874; Brookesia spectrum Loveridge, 1951; Rhampholeon affinis Steindachner, 1911

= Spectral pygmy chameleon =

Species of lizard

The spectral pygmy chameleon (Rhampholeon spectrum), also known as western pygmy chameleon or Cameroon stumptail chameleon, is one of the so-called "dwarf" or "leaf" chameleons, from mainland Africa.

== Distribution ==
The exact distribution differs between sources, but includes at least Cameroon, Equatorial Guinea, and Gabon, and may include the Central African Republic, the Republic of the Congo, and Nigeria.

== Description ==
They are small, not exceeding 10 cm (4 in), with very short, albeit prehensile, tails. They tend to frequent the ground and low shrubbery in forested areas.

This species is capable of color change, but generally in somber shades of tan to gray. It also has a ventral stripe from the eye to above the base of the tail which, however, is not always displayed in lieu of plain ground colors. It is capable of quite striking coloration in the form of streaks and blotches.

In spite of their small size, plain color, and often terrestrial habits, they are otherwise very much like the larger chameleons in possessing independently rotating eye sockets, opposable digits on the front and back feet, and projectile tongues. Males may be differentiated from females by their wider tail bases.

== Behavior ==
They are extremely sedentary, and not territorial (unlike other chameleons). They eat small invertebrates. Their reproductive habits are poorly known. These animals seem to prefer cooler temperatures.
