= Rhampholeon gorongosae =

Conservation status
- Endangered (IUCN 3.1)

Scientific classification
- Kingdom: Animalia
- Phylum: Chordata
- Class: Reptilia
- Order: Squamata
- Suborder: Iguania
- Family: Chamaeleonidae
- Genus: Rhampholeon
- Species: R. gorongosae

Binomial name
- Rhampholeon gorongosae Broadley, 1971

Species of lizard

Rhampholeon gorongosae, the Mount Gorongosa pygmy chameleon, is a species of chameleon endemic to Mozambique.
