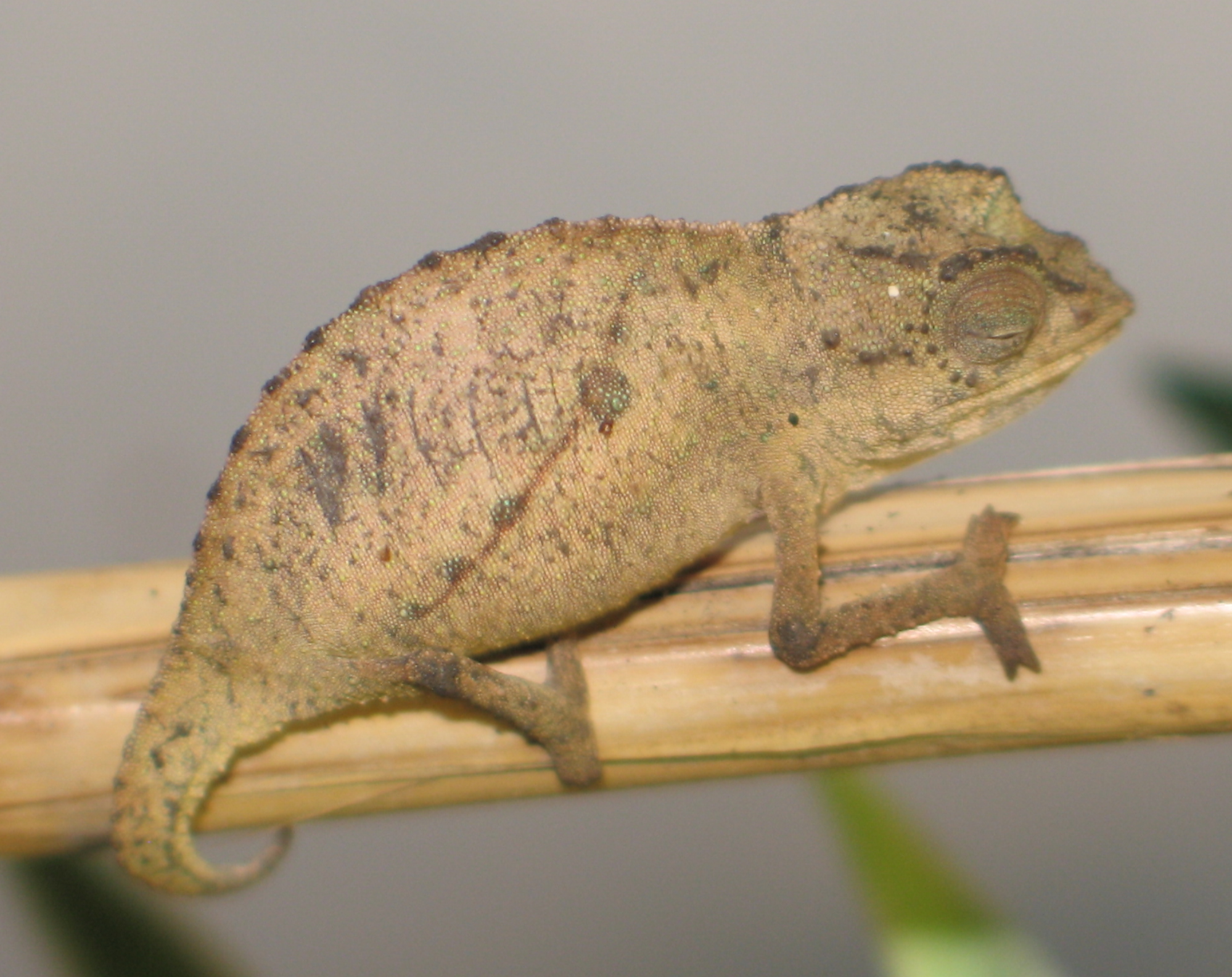
- Rhampholeon temporalis

Scientific classification
- Kingdom: Animalia
- Phylum: Chordata
- Class: Reptilia
- Order: Squamata
- Suborder: Iguania
- Family: Chamaeleonidae
- Subfamily: Chamaeleoninae
- Genus: Rhampholeon; Günther, 1874

= Rhampholeon =

Genus of lizards

Rhampholeon (from Ancient Greek ῥάμφος (rhámphos), meaning "bill", and λέων (léōn), meaning "lion") is a genus of small chameleons, commonly known as pygmy chameleons or African leaf chameleons, found in East Africa and Central Africa. They are found in forests, woodlands, thickets, and savanna, and most species are restricted to highlands. They are brown, grey, or green, and typically seen at low levels in bushes, or on the ground among grasses or leaf litter.

== Species ==
The following 25 species are recognized as being valid:

Image	Scientific name	Common name	Distribution
	Rhampholeon acuminatus Mariaux & Tilbury, 2006	Nguru pygmy chameleon	Tanzania
	Rhampholeon beraduccii Mariaux & Tilbury, 2006	Beraducci’s pygmy chameleon, Mahenge pygmy chameleon	Tanzania
	Rhampholeon boulengeri Steindachner, 1911	Boulenger's pygmy chameleon	Burundi, Democratic Republic of Congo, Kenya, Rwanda, Tanzania, and Uganda
	Rhampholeon bruessoworum Branch, Bayliss & Tolley, 2014	Mount Inago pygmy chameleon	Mozambique
	Rhampholeon chapmanorum Tilbury, 1992	Chapmans's pygmy chameleon	Malawi
	Rhampholeon colemani Menegon, Lyakurwa, Loader, & Tolley, 2022		Tanzania
	Rhampholeon gorongosae Broadley 1971	Mount Gorongosa pygmy chameleon	Mozambique
	Rhampholeon hattinghi Tilbury & Tolley, 2015		Democratic Republic of the Congo
	Rhampholeon marshalli Boulenger, 1906	Marshall's pygmy chameleon, Marshall's leaf chameleon, Marshall's dwarf chameleon, Marshall's stumptail chameleon	Zimbabwe and Mozambique
	Rhampholeon maspictus Branch, Bayliss & Tolley, 2014	Mount Mabu pygmy chameleon	Mozambique
	Rhampholeon moyeri Menegon, Salvidio & Tilbury, 2002	Moyer’s pygmy chameleon, Udzungwa pygmy chameleon	Tanzania
	Rhampholeon nchisiensis (Loveridge, 1953)	South African stumptail chameleon, Nchisi pygmy chameleon	Malawi and Tanzania
	Rhampholeon nebulauctor Branch, Bayliss & Tolley, 2014	Mount Chiperone pygmy chameleon	Mozambique
	Rhampholeon nicolai Menegon, Lyakurwa, Loader, & Tolley, 2022	Nicola’s pygmy chameleon	Tanzania.
	Rhampholeon platyceps Günther, 1893	Mount Mulanje pygmy chameleon, Malawi stumptail chameleon	Malawi and Mozambique
	Rhampholeon princeeai Menegon, Lyakurwa, Loader, & Tolley, 2022	Princeeai’s pygmy chameleon	Tanzania
	Rhampholeon rubeho Menegon, Lyakurwa, Loader, & Tolley, 2022	Rubeho’s pygmy chameleon	Tanzania
	Rhampholeon sabini Menegon, Lyakurwa, Loader, & Tolley, 2022	Nguu North pygmy chameleon	Tanzania
	Rhampholeon spectrum (Buchholz, 1874)	spectral pygmy chameleon, western pygmy chameleon, Cameroon stumptail chameleon	Cameroon, Equatorial Guinea, Central African Republic, the Republic of the Congo, Nigeria, and Gabon
	Rhampholeon spinosus (Matschie, 1892)	rosette-nosed pygmy chameleon	Tanzania
	Rhampholeon temporalis (Matschie, 1892)	Usambara stumptail chameleon, East Usambara pygmy chameleon	Tanzania
	Rhampholeon tilburyi Branch, Bayliss & Tolley, 2014	Mount Namuli pygmy chameleon	Mozambique
	Rhampholeon uluguruensis Tilbury & Emmrich, 1996	Uluguru pygmy chameleon	Tanzania
	Rhampholeon viridis Mariaux & Tilbury, 2006	green pygmy chameleon	Tanzania
	Rhampholeon waynelotteri Menegon, Lyakurwa, Loader, & Tolley, 2022		Tanzania

Nota bene: A binomial authority in parentheses indicates that the species was originally described in a genus other than Rhampholeon.
