= Rhampholeon platyceps =

Conservation status
- Endangered (IUCN 3.1)

Scientific classification
- Kingdom: Animalia
- Phylum: Chordata
- Class: Reptilia
- Order: Squamata
- Suborder: Iguania
- Family: Chamaeleonidae
- Genus: Rhampholeon
- Species: R. platyceps

Binomial name
- Rhampholeon platyceps Günther, 1893

Species of lizard

Rhampholeon platyceps, the Mount Mulanje pygmy chameleon or Malawi stumptail chameleon, is a species of chameleon found in Malawi and Mozambique.
