= History of Maputo =

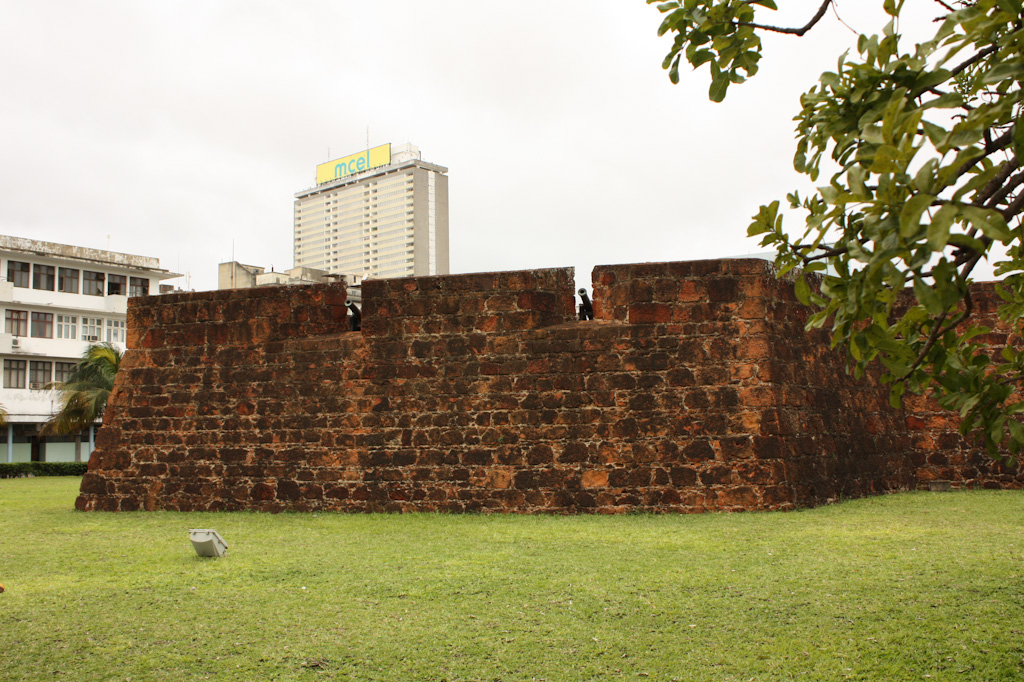
The Maputo Fortress, constructed in 1781

The history of Maputo, the capital of Mozambique, traces its origins back over 500 years, when a fishing village developed by Maputo Bay on the site where the modern city of Maputo now stands. The first Europeans to discover the bay were Portuguese navigators led by António de Campo in 1502. In 1544, the Portuguese merchant and explorer Lourenço Marques reached the bay and named it Delagoa Bay. The Portuguese established a fort on the site, but were soon forced to abandon it. In 1721, the Dutch East India Company established Fort Lydsaamheid on the bay, but abandoned it due to conflicts with local Africans and the unhealthy environment. In the mid-18th century, the Portuguese returned to the bay, selling ivory to British ships carrying Indian textiles. In 1773, William Bolts of the Trieste Company reached the bay and claimed it for the Holy Roman Empire. Bolts and the Austrians were forced out in 1781 by Portuguese ships sent from Goa.

That year, hoping to prevent other European powers from claiming the area in the future, the Portuguese constructed a fortress on the bay, naming it Lourenço Marques. During the late 18th and early 19th century, the fort was mainly used by French, British, and American whaling ships to stop for provisions. A town grew around the fort starting around 1850, and in 1877, it was elevated to city status. In 1898, the colony of Portuguese Mozambique relocated its capital there. In the late 19th and early 20th centuries, Lourenço Marques grew both in population and economic development as a port city. Upon Mozambican independence in 1975, the city became the national capital and was renamed Maputo. During the Mozambican Civil War, the city's economy was devastated. When the war ended, the FRELIMO government launched a program to revive the city's economy, and to clean up the city by forcibly removing criminals, squatters, and undocumented residents. Since then, Maputo's economy, centered around its port, has recovered, and stability has returned.

== European exploration and settlement, 1500–1820 ==
=== First inhabitants and Portuguese exploration ===
The first inhabitants of the region surrounding what is now known as Maputo Bay were likely Khoisan peoples. Around 700 years ago, Ronga-speaking Bantus migrated from the north and settled around the area. By the 1500s, the site that Maputo now occupies had developed into a small fishing village.

The first Europeans to reach the bay were Portuguese seamen under the command of António de Campo, one of Vasco da Gama's captains, in 1502. In 1544, the Portuguese merchant trader and explorer Lourenço Marques, along with António Caldeira, was sent by the Governor of Mozambique Island on a voyage of exploration. Marques visited the bay, and navigated the upper reaches of the estuaries feeding into it. Marques named the bay Baía da Lagoa (Portuguese: "Bay of the Lagoon"), which was anglicized to Delagoa Bay. King John III of Portugal declared the bay Baía de Lourenço Marques in his honor, but this name was never used commonly outside of Portugal. In the late 16th century or 17th century, the Portuguese established La Goa, a fort and trading post, on the site. The fort, manned by a single Catholic friar and several merchants, was a small-scale but profitable enterprise. However, ultimately the multitudes of mosquitos that swarmed the area forced the Portuguese to abandon the fort.

=== Dutch fort, 1720s ===
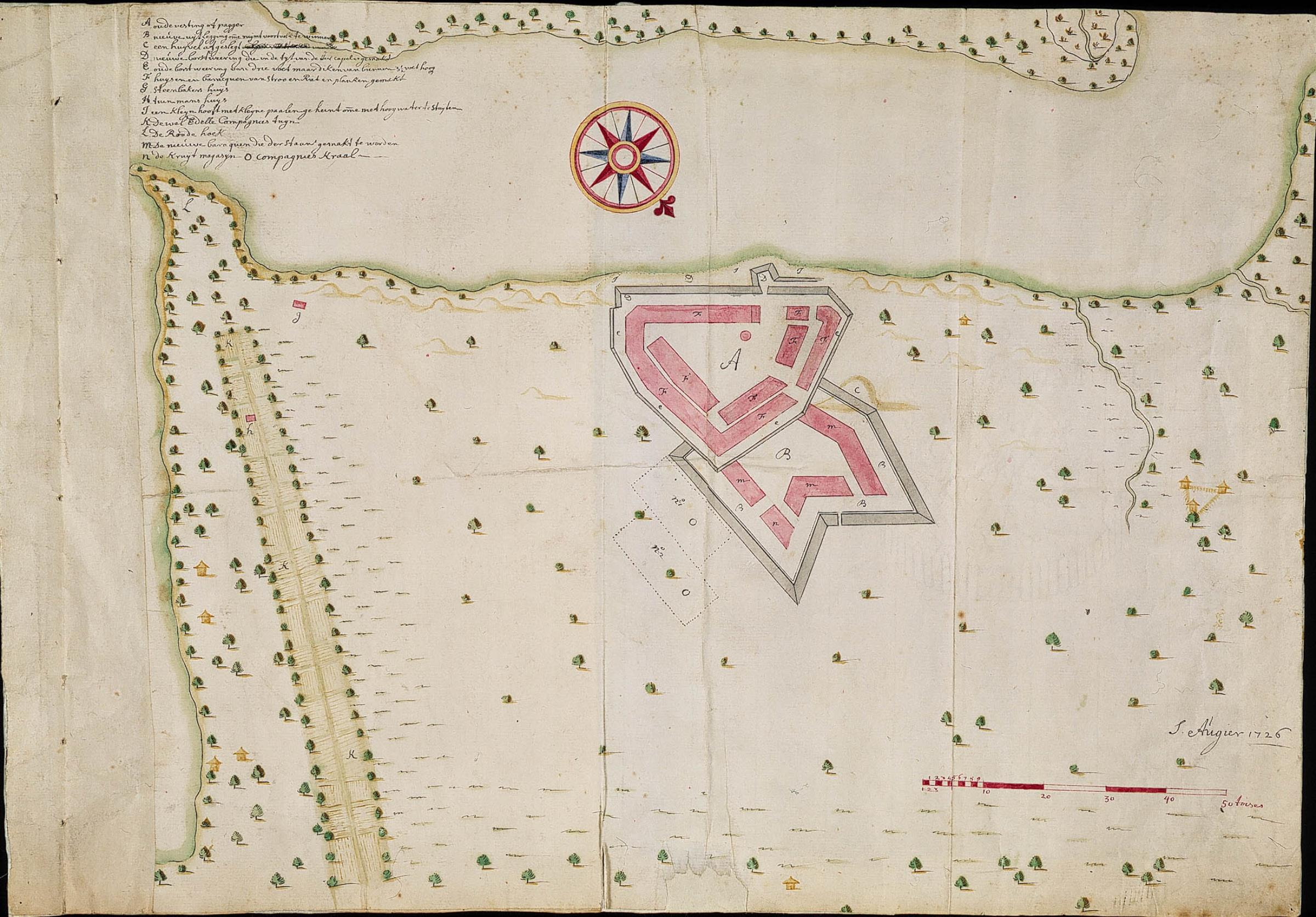
Plan of Fort Lydsaamheid, built by the Dutch East India Company in 1720.

On 29 March 1720, three Dutch ships, the Kaap, the Gouda, and the Zeelandia, reached the bay. The Dutch navigators, led by Johannes Steffler, were warmly welcomed by the local Batonga tribe and its chief, Mpfumu. In March 1721, the Dutch East India Company purchased the land around the bay from Mpfumu and set about reconstructing the old Portuguese fort, which had fallen into ruin. The repaired fort was named Fort Lydsaamheid (Dutch: "Fort Endurance"). Within three weeks of their arrival 100 of the original sailors, craftsmen, and soldiers had died of fever. In August 1720, 80 new arrivals came to replace them. Beginning in April 1721, it was governed by an opperhoofd as a dependency of the Dutch Cape Colony. From April to 28 August 1722, when the Dutch recaptured it, the fort was occupied by pirates led by John Taylor.

Fort Lydsaamheid's trade mainly centered around the trade of ivory, and to a lesser extent, slaves, tin, aloes, gold dust, ambergris, honey, copper, and rice. During the fort's nine years of operation, it exported 22,500 kg (49,574 lb) of ivory, and 288 slaves. The slave trade, while at its global peak, was minimal, because Dutch slave traders preferred to go to northern ports, where slaves could be more easily obtained, instead of Lydsaamheid, which was not equipped to handle large quantities. The settlers at the fort tried to farm, but all attempts ended in failure.

In addition to trading, the fort was used as the starting point for several expeditions into the Mozambican interior in search of reputed gold mines in Monomatapa, which the Dutch believed was the gold-producing region mentioned as Ophir in the Bible. The first such expedition, led by Steffler, was forced to turn back after they were attacked by natives in the Lebombo Mountains. Another expedition, this time led by Johannes Monna in the late 1720s, set forth with native guides, but after failed trading attempts and a skirmish with a tribe armed with spears, also turned back. They returned to find Fort Lydsaamheid in a state of disorder following the discovery of a mutiny plot. The 62 would-be mutineers, who were disgruntled with the fort's terrible conditions, were arrested, tortured, and killed after their plans were discovered. Of the 62, 22 had been beaten with iron bars and their heads severed, others suffocated and beheaded, and the remainder simply hanged. In addition, in 1728, 28 Dutch soldiers abandoned Lydsaamheid and trekked to Inhambane, where the eighteen who survived the journey told the Portuguese there of the mistreatment and diseases they had experienced at the fort.

Throughout its existence, Fort Lydsaamheid suffered from meager trade, an unhealthy environment, and general discord, and had failed to find the fabled gold-producing region. In 1729, Cape Colony officials received orders from Heeren XVII, the Dutch East India Company's board of directors, to abandon the fort. Instead of immediately implementing these orders, the colony offered a one-year grace period to the fort's personnel. However, during this period, the fort's men, under the leadership of Jan van de Capelle, attacked Chief Mafumbo, whose tribe had settled too close for comfort. In a battle that followed, several local chiefs attacked, killing all the Dutch soldiers except for one slave. In response, Capelle wrote to Cape Colony officials, requesting reinforcements to deal with the "hostile natives." This series of events angered Cape Town leaders, as the men of Fort Lydsaamheid were involving themselves in conflicts when they were supposed to be preparing to leave. In addition, colony officials lambasted the men for their "lazy" lifestyle, often spending the days fishing instead of surveying the region. In April 1730, Cape Colony leaders resolved to evacuate the remaining men from the fort and bring them to Cape Town. On 27 December 1730, the last 133 Dutchmen boarded the Snuffelaar, arriving in Cape Town in January 1731. Before leaving, they stripped the fort of every remaining item, and demolished the palisade so that no other European power could seize it. Within three years of abandonment, the fort was an overgrown ruin, with only a few walls remaining standing.

=== Revival of trade, 1730s–1770s ===
The 1730s and 40s saw decreased commercial activities in and around Delagoa Bay. A Dutch ship, the Brack, which stopped in the bay in 1742 while on a voyage to Madagascar, reported that the area was mostly deserted, with a small number of natives (who were still able to communicate in Dutch). They also encountered a few remaining merchants, selling a small number of slaves, but no ivory. The revival of trade in Delagoa Bay came with expanding British trade with India. Since the abandonment of the Dutch fort, the Portuguese had intermittently maintained trading posts in the Espíritu Santo estuary within the bay. Initially, beads, arms, and arraco (a coconut product) were shipped from Madras to Mozambique Island, where Dutch merchant vessels would pick them up and bring them to Delagoa Bay. Still, trade grew slowly and remained risky, in part because of hostility of Portuguese officials towards British merchant ships. Despite the captain of Inhambane having urged the reestablishment of Portuguese authority in the bay since 1745, the Crown only did so in 1755 with sending the barque Francisco Xavier. The purpose, in addition to hopes of using the region to "provide slaves for Brazil", was to prevent any possible British attempts to colonize Delagoa Bay. In addition, as trade was just picking up, the Portuguese saw an opportunity to draw high prices for its Deccan cotton fabrics in exchange for ivory. Unexpectedly, a Bombay trading vessel, the British Salamander Bombketch, showed up as well, ruining Portugal's market opportunity. The Xavier, unable to sell its expensive textiles, left the bay, and ran aground on the way to Quelimane. During the 1750s and 60s, the British dominated trade in Delagoa Bay.

=== Austrian colonization, 1770s ===
Neither the British nor the Portuguese were willing to go forward with the risky venture of constructing a fort in Delagoa Bay. Nevertheless, the Portuguese sent a new ship to Delagoa in 1762. The goal was to establish a small trading post, and to either sign treaties with or purchase the surrounding land from the Kingdom of Tembe in order to keep the British out. The Portuguese constructed a mud structure on the bay, with a captain and 50 soldiers. But like the Dutch before them, disease forced them to abandoned the post after four years. Only the muzambazes, Portuguese-owned trading slaves, remained, with a reputation for robbing visitors.

With the lapse of Portuguese presence in the bay, Dutch/English merchant William Bolts saw an opportunity. Bolts, who had a ten-year charter authorizing him to trade under the colors of the Holy Roman Empire, arrived at Delagoa Bay in 1773, aiming to establish a trading house as a base for trade between East Africa and ports on the west coast of India. He procured three ships, including the flagship Joseph und Theresia, to conduct this "country trade", as trade by Europeans between India and other non-European destinations was called. During his voyage, he obtained Brazilian cochineal beetles to bring for use in making scarlet dies and carmine. Representing his newly founded Trieste Company, he raised the Imperial flag and built two small forts, St. Joseph and St. Maria. He established a settlement with 155 men. Bolts eventually departed, leaving it under the leadership of Andreas Daniel Pollet. The Trieste Company maintained the forts for four years, when modest commercial profits forced them to return to solely onboard trading. By 1780, trade had grown significantly: ships from Bombay, Surat, and Madras frequently arrived with Gujarati textiles and left the bay with ivory, usually stopping in Madagascar to purchase slaves before returning to India.

In April 1781, Portugal, alarmed at the encroachment on their claimed territory, sent five ships, including a 40-gun frigate, and 500 men, from Goa to force the Austrians out. The Portuguese took any remaining Trieste Company people as prisoners, including their commander, Pollet, seized their two anchored ships, demolished their buildings..

=== Reassertion of Portuguese control, 1780s–1810s ===
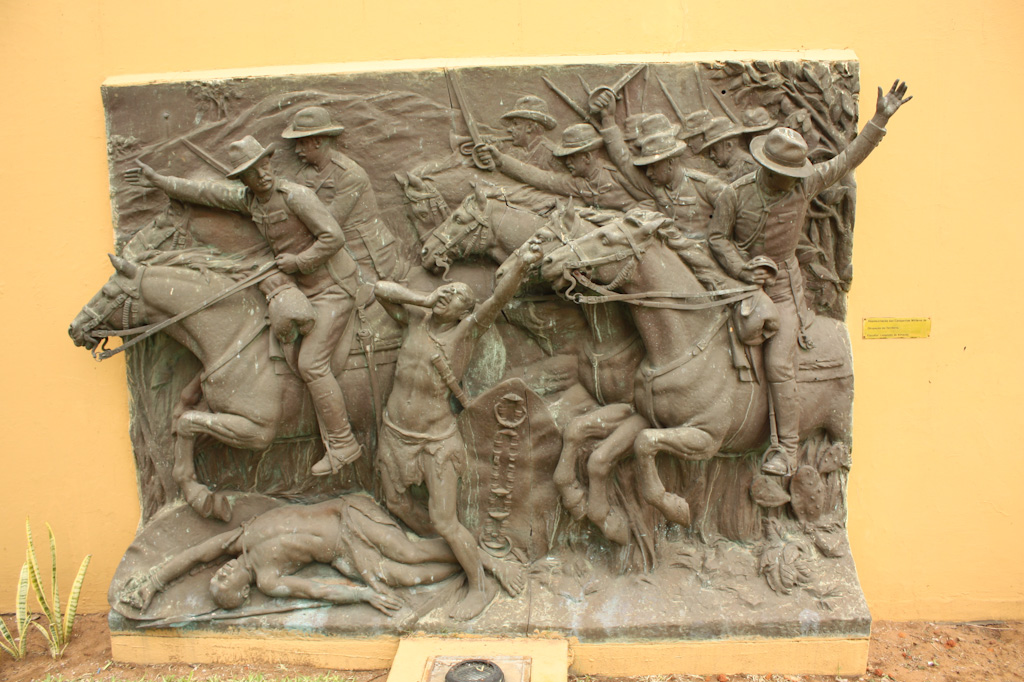
Fort Nossa Senhora da Conceição de Lourenço Marques, built in 1782

In order to prevent future intrusions, the Portuguese immediately established a garrison and recommenced trade at Delagoa Bay. The new fort was called Fortaleza da Nossa Senhora da Conceicao (Portuguese: "Fort of Our Lady of the Conception"). The Portuguese settlement was commonly called Lourenço Marques, after the explorer. Initially, the port's commercial success was scanty. In 1790, they sold 4,000 pieces of Indian textiles, a meager increase from the 3,000 that were sold 70 years earlier in 1720. While Indian cloth was not selling very well, there was increased demand for European textiles (20,000 sold in 1790), and to a lesser extent, beads and coral. In addition, shipments sent down the Maputo River brought ivory, rhinoceros horns, hippopotamus teeth, amber, gold, copper, agricultural products, and a small number of slaves. Although by the turn of the 19th century they were turning some profit through the sale of ivory, the Portuguese' main purpose for maintaining the fort was to prevent the Austrians or the British from reasserting themselves in the bay. If it were not for the Portuguese Crown's insistence on maintaining the fort, the colonial government on Mozambique Island would likely have abandoned the struggling settlement.

The Portuguese briefly abandoned Lourenço Marques after a French attack in 1796, returning in 1799. In 1801, the small Portuguese garrison was unable to prevent an English ship from trading in Delagoa Bay. Though there is limited documentation of this period, it is thought that very little trade was carried out in the bay during the first two decades of the 19th century. The next British ship to enter the bay was 14 years later in 1815, by which point the Portuguese were able to successfully turn them away. Much of the economic activity that remained in this period consisted of visits by whaling ships stopping for provisions. French and British whaling ships had been stopping at the port since 1789, and while French ships were no longer welcome after having attacked the fort, British and American whaling vessels continued to resupply at the bay through the early 19th century. By 1817, the Portuguese planned to use the port to enter the whaling industry. That year, their first attempt to establish a whaling company in Delagoa Bay failed when their representative alienated a local Tembe chief by neglected to ask permission to use the tribe's land. The chief ended up killing the Portuguese men involved. With the second attempt in 1818, the whaling company was established, with black harpooners and specialized equipment brought in from North America. By this period, the slave trade in Mozambique was found up north, and in Delagoa Bay it was nearly nonexistent, perhaps being a factor in the Portuguese search for other ventures like whaling. By the 1820s, the slave trade had grown in Delagoa Bay, but was still small compared to the north.

== Portuguese colonization and territorial disputes, 1820–1900 ==
=== British claims and African upheaval, 1820s ===
Beginning in 1821, Captain William Fitzwilliam Owen was sent by the British to survey the East African coast. Upon visiting Delagoa Bay, Owen wrote to his superiors that the Portuguese fort there was still so isolated as to sometimes experience food shortages. Eager for incriminating evidence that could provide Britain an excuse to take the region from Portugal, he wrote that Lourenço Marques had the potential to become a major participant in the slave trade. The fact that he cited the port's potential to trade slaves, rather than any actual trading, is indicative that the slave trade in Delagoa Bay was still very modest at that time. Owen, upon finding that the Kingdom of Tembi, located on the bay, south of Lourenço Marques, was still unclaimed by a European colonial power, set to claim it for the United Kingdom. In March 1823, he reached an agreement with King Kapell, who ceded his kingdom to the British, saying:

"I, King Kepal [Kapell] do declare that I am induced to make this cession by the advice of my chiefs because I find my state too weak to defend themselves against the aggression of either Africans or Europeans."

Owen claimed for Britain the land south of the English River (today known as the Estuário do Espírito Santo). However, when he visited the bay again in 1824, he found that the Portuguese, disregarding the British treaty, had reached their own treaties with the African natives, and they endeavored (unsuccessfully) to take military possession of the country. Owen was able to take back control of the territory, but it remained disputed. Although the Union Jack flew over the area, the United Kingdom had taken no steps to exercise authority over the territory, while the ravages of Zulus confined the Portuguese to the limits of their fort. The Vatwas, a Nguni-speaking Zulu tribe, had recently migrated to the area, raiding the local villages for food and laying waste to the bay region, with the exception of the southern part. After two years without rain, drought was already causing famine, and compounded by the devastating attacks of the Vatwas, the local African population at the time was suffering from social upheaval. The decade-long turbulence was exacerbated by the social effects of increased slave trading during the late 1820s. Some stability was restored by the 1830s, when the effects of the drought had passed and slave trading declined.

By 1829, Lourenço Marques still consisted of a small, fortified trading post, known to locals as Xilunguíne ("Site of Whites"). Prior to 1826, the French, British, and American ships entering the bay traded either with the Portuguese port, or directly with African traders and tribal chiefs. Trade became more regulated in 1826, when a trading company was granted a monopoly over the ivory trade in the bay, allowing only them to purchase directly from African traders, and negatively effecting commerce in Lourenço Marques. The population of the fort at the time was just a few hundred, and consisted of three main groups: government personnel, including soldiers, civil servants, and their servants and slaves, Portuguese East India Company officials and slaves, and 300–400 Africans living within the fort's borders.

=== Zulu conflict, 1830s ===
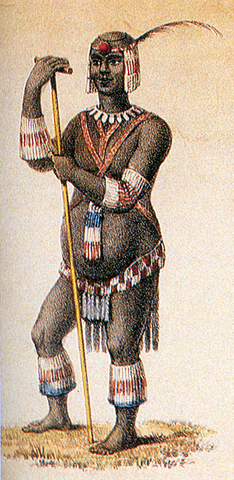
Zulu King Dingane attacked Lourenço Marques in 1833

In 1833, for reasons that are not entirely clear, Zulu King Dingane kaSenzangakhona attacked Lourenço Marques. On 26 July 1833, Dingane and his army, accompanied by auxiliaries from two other tribes, arrived in front of the fort and burned nearby native villages. Anticipating an attack, the governor of Lourenço Marques, Dionísio António Ribeiro, along with much of the fort's personnel, left to take refuge on Xefina Island, ten miles east of the fort. Some soldiers remained at the fort, along with the head of the trading company, who disagreed with the decision to leave. On 17 September 1833, Dingane's army sacked the fort, but not the trading facilities. Nobre, the trading company head, had convinced the Portuguese soldiers not to resist the Zulus. Nobre made an arrangement with the Zulus and emerged safe from the conflict. On 16 September, Dingane ordered his men to pursue and kill Governor Ribeiro. When Zulu warriors arrived on the mainland across from Xefina Island on 6 October, Ribeiro took a boat, planning to stop at Magaia and then go meet the Ndwandwe leader Soshangane, an ally whom he had invited to attack the Zulus. However, before reaching his destination, the ship had to stop on the coast due to stormy weather. There, Ribeiro was captured by the Zulu, who killed three of his men and took him back to Lourenço Marques, where he was executed on 12 October 1833. Before his execution, a Zulu reportedly gave a public speech, and said:

"The governor will die because of his treachery and tyranny—for having usurped the land of the King Dingan [sic] and Machacana, made war on him without motive, sent his people to [the Island of] Moçambique, ... having had flags hoisted in the lands of those kings without their consent under the force of arms, [and] sent powder and ball to King Dingan."

While the explicitly stated motivations for the Zulu invasion of Lourenço Marques and the execution of Ribeiro were the governor's land expansion into Zulu territory, there may have been other reasons unstated in the speech. The commercial downturn accompanying the decline of the slave trade by 1830 effected the Zulu, who may have instead perceived the economic hardship as resulting from Portuguese greed. In addition, Ribeiro's lack of caution in his interactions with the volatile Dingane, who often switched from fighting with or against the Portuguese in the periodic conflicts with other tribes, and the governor's amicable relations with Soshangane, an enemy of the Zulu, were likely contributing factors. Following Ribeiro's death, Nobre, the trader, took over as acting governor. On 21 August 1834, Ribeiro's successor, Dario Rodrigues de Vasconellos, arrived at Lourenço Marques. Two days later, a Zulu representative of Dingane arrived to ask for tribute.

By the mid-1830s, the Zulu Kingdom controlled much of the area to the west and south of Delagoa Bay, while Soshangane's Gaza Empire controlled much of the area to the north of Lourenço Marques. In 1835 a group of Boers led by a man named Orich traveled from the Transvaal and attempted to form a settlement on the bay. However, their population was decimated by fever and they soon abandoned the settlement.

=== British and Boer disputes, 1860s–1870s ===
In the 1860s, both the British and Boers made short-lived claims to territory around Deleagoa Bay. On 5 November 1861, Royal Navy Captain Bickford, of the frigate HMS Narcissus, occupied Inhaca Island and Elephant Island, and declared them British territory. Portugal protested this act, and in 1872 the dispute was submitted to the arbitration of Adolphe Thiers, the President of France. Thiers' successor, Patrice de MacMahon, on 24 July 1875 ruled in favor of Portugal, restoring their right to all lands south of Delagoa Bay. Previously, the United Kingdom and Portugal had agreed that a right of pre-emption would be granted to the unsuccessful claimant in case of sale or cession of the bay. Portuguese authority over the Mozambican interior was not established until some time after the MacMahon decision; nominally, the country south of the Manhissa river was ceded to them by the Matshangana chief Umzila in 1861. In honor of the French president's decision, the plaza where the Maputo Railway Station would later be built was renamed Praça MacMahon (Portuguese: "MacMahon Square"). A few years before, in 1868, the President of the Republic of the Transvaal, Marthinus Wessel Pretorius, claimed the territory on each side of the Maputo River down to the sea. In the following year, however, the Transvaal government acknowledged Portugal's sovereignty over the bay.

=== Development of the city, 1850s–1890s ===
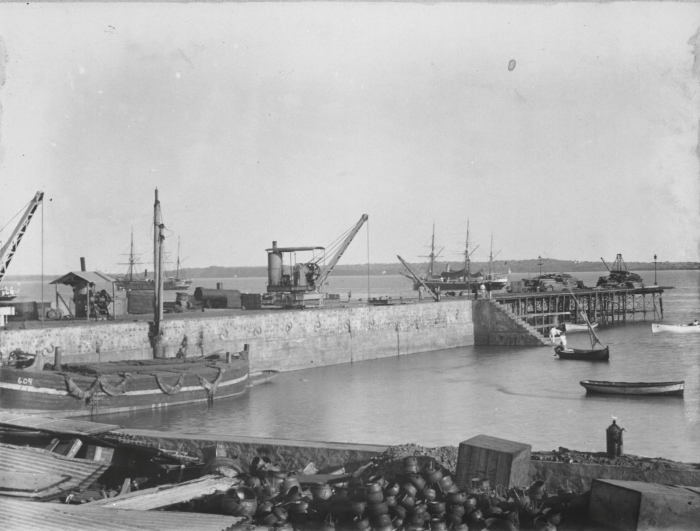
Lourenço Marques port, 1896

In 1850, a small town was founded next to the fort. The town, like the fort, became known as Lourenço Marques. In 1871, the town was described as a poor place, with narrow streets, fairly good flat-roofed houses, grass huts, decayed forts, and a rusty cannon, enclosed by a recently erected wall 1.8 metres (6 ft) high and protected by bastions at intervals. On 9 December 1876, Lourenço Marques was elevated to village status. The growing strength of the Transvaal led, to greater interest being taken back in Portugal in the development of a port. A commission was sent by the Portuguese government in 1876 to drain the marshy land near the settlement, to plant blue gum trees, and to build a hospital and a church. In 1885, the Vasco de Gama Gardens were laid out. On 10 November 1887, Lourenço Marques was declared a city by a royal decree by King Luís, who cited the settlement's material improvements and economic potential.

The Witwatersrand Gold Rush, which began in 1886, further increased the economic development of the city in the late 19th and early 20th centuries as Lourenço Marques served as the closest seaport for the export of gold and diamonds from South Africa. In 1889, another dispute arose between Portugal and the United Kingdom over the Portuguese seizure of the railway running from the bay to the Transvaal. This dispute was also referred to arbitration: in 1900, Portugal was found liable and ordered to pay nearly £1,000,000 in compensation to the railway company's shareholders. In 1892, a commercial newspaper, O Commercio de Lourenço Marques, began publication. In 1895, construction of a railroad to Pretoria, South Africa, caused the city's population to grow. In 1898, Lourenço Marques replaced the Island of Mozambique as the capital of Portuguese Mozambique.

In 1891, a Portuguese politician, António José Enes, succeeded Júlio de Vilhena as High Commissioner of Mozambique. He, based out of Lourenço Marques, resisted British attempts to enter the region, defeated powerful African rulers, and solidified Portuguese military control over southern Mozambique. Chief Mpfumu Nuamantibjane of the Magaia tribe, one of the greatest opponents of Portuguese colonial occupation of Delagoa Bay, was defeated by Enes. Along with Joaquim Augusto Mouzinho de Albuquerque, he organized an expedition to conquer the Gaza Empire, defeating them in 1895.

== Urban growth and colonial rule, 1900–1975 ==
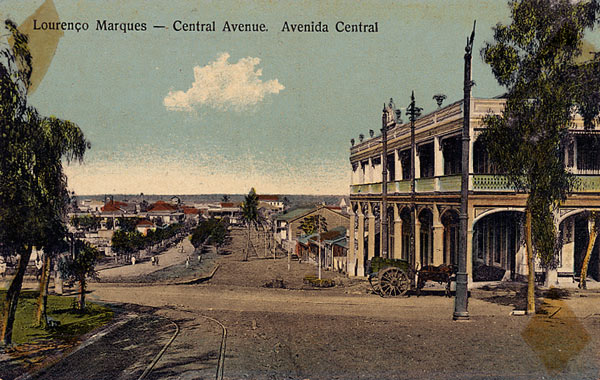
Lourenço Marques, c. 1905

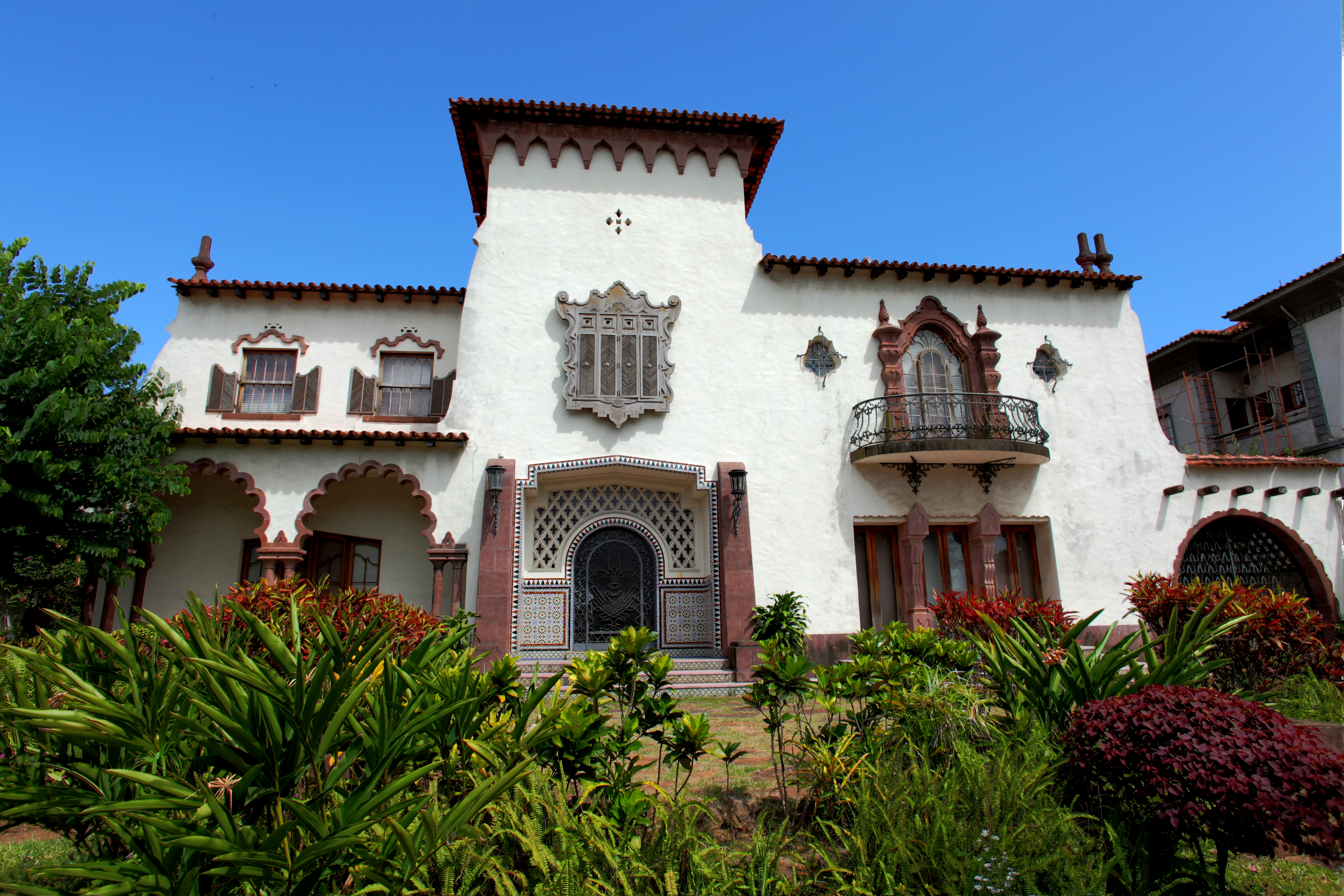
Portuguese colonial-era residence

In the early 20th century, with a well-equipped seaport, with piers, quays, landing sheds and electric cranes, enabling large vessels to discharge cargoes direct into the rail cars, Lourenço Marques developed under Portuguese rule into an economically important city. It was served by British, Portuguese, and German cargo liners, and the majority of its imported goods were shipped at Southampton, Lisbon, and Hamburg. In 1904, the year the city's tram network began operating, it had a population of 9,849. By 1912, the population had grown to 13,353. In 1916, the Central Railway Station was constructed. In 1934, the Historical Archive of Mozambique became headquartered in the city.

Map of Lourenço Marques, 1929

During the early and mid-20th century, Lourenço Marques population grew quickly due to a lack of restriction on the internal migration of indigenous blacks, a situation that differed from the apartheid policies of neighboring South Africa. From a 1935 population of 47,390, the city's population nearly doubled to 93,516 by 1950. Although blacks were allowed to move to Lourenço Marques, colonial authorities did maintain a degree of separation. Only whites were allowed to live in the city center, where in the 1950s and 60s colonial authorities built many concrete high-rise buildings to house the expatriate Portuguese population. Meanwhile, most blacks had to live in undeveloped slums in outer sections of the city. Mafalala, one such slum, became the center of black resistance to colonial rule, housing many leaders of the Marxist FRELIMO movement. At the same time, the treatment of blacks in the city was more humane than in segregated South African cities like Johannesburg: in Lourenço Marques, businesses, churches, and schools were all non-segregated.

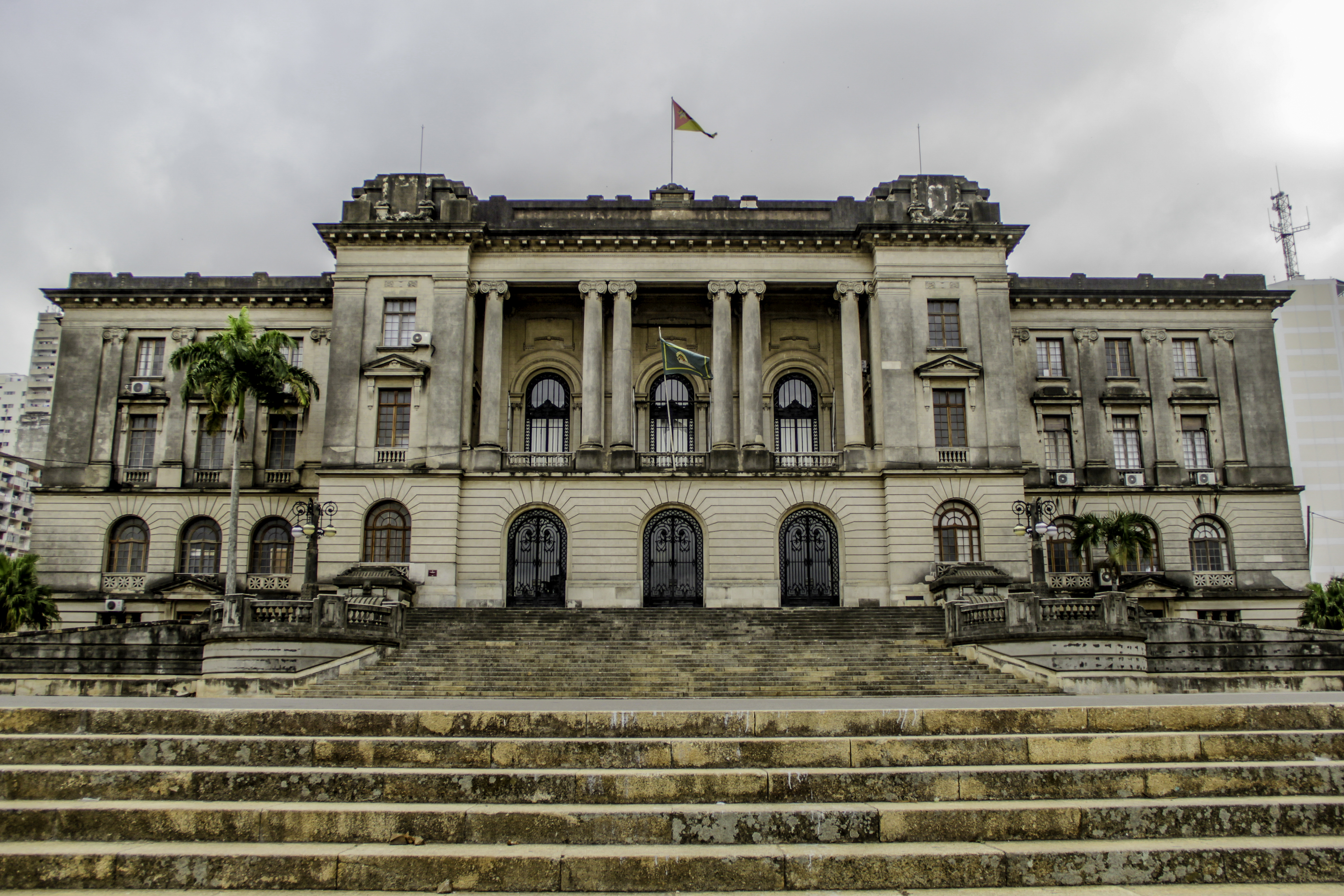
Maputo City Hall, completed in 1947

With the continuous growth of the city's population and its expanding economy centered on the seaport, from the 1940s, Portugal's administration built a network of primary and secondary schools, industrial and commercial schools as well as the first university in the country — the University of Lourenço Marques opened in 1962. Portuguese, Islamic (including Ismailis), Indian (including from Portuguese India) and Chinese (including Macanese) communities — but not the unskilled African majority — achieved great prosperity by developing the industrial and commercial sectors of the city. The first terminal of Lourenço Marques Airport was constructed in 1940, the Art Deco Catholic Cathedral of Our Lady of the Immaculate Conception was built four years later, and Maputo City Hall was completed in 1947. In 1962, the National Library of Mozambique was established, and in 1968, the Estádio Salazar inaugurated in Matola. Until the mid-1970s, thousands of Rhodesian and South African tourists frequented the city, drawn by its scenic beaches, high-quality hotels, restaurants, and lively entertainment scene, including casinos and brothels. With wide avenues lined by jacaranda and acacia trees, it earned the nicknames City of Acacias and the Pearl of the Indian Ocean. In 1970, Tempo, the first full-color magazine in the country, began publication as a voice of opposition to Portuguese colonial rule. In 1970, the city had a population of 383,775.

== Independence, 1975–present ==
=== Lusaka Accord and aftermath ===
In April 1974, the Carnation Revolution in Portugal overthrew the Estado Novo regime, which had defied the European trend of granting independence to African colonies. On 4 August, the new Portuguese government pledged to grant independence to Mozambique soon. Later that day, a crowd of 30,000 gathered in Lourenço Marques to show support of the Portuguese government's decision. With the signing of the Lusaka Accord on 7 September 1974, the ten-year Mozambican War of Independence ended in a ceasefire and the transition to independence began.

The day the Lusaka Accord was signed, a group of right-wing white dissidents, calling themselves the Movement for a Free Mozambique, challenged the independence deal by attempting to seize control of Lourenço Marques. The dissidents freed a former secret police officer from prison and occupied the city's post office, the airport's air traffic control tower, and the main radio station, taking women and children hostage. From the radio station, they broadcast demands for Portugal to grant Mozambique independence without handing over power to FRELIMO, so that the Movement for a Free Mozambique could set up a "multiracial" government. Police and Portuguese soldiers surrounded the occupied sites, but did not immediately remove the dissidents because they were keeping hostages. Just outside the city, two whites and one black person were killed when black counter-demonstrators stoned a vehicle being driven by dissidents at the airport. Portuguese authorities reported that no other areas of the country besides the capital saw any violence occur in reaction to the Lusaka Accord. In response to the white backlash, FRELIMO said they would "smash the rebellion" with the help of Portuguese troops. In Portugal, Prime Minister Vasco Gonçalves said the Portuguese Armed Forces were not seeking FRELIMO's help in restoring order, and said that he saw the events not as a coup d'état, "but rather a desperate act by a minority which does not understand the historic processes and the ways of the future." By the time the weeklong coup attempt had ended, homes and businesses had been looted, and 86 people were dead, including 27 whites.

Shortly after the failed coup d'état attempt, a transitional, black-majority government was installed, led by Joaquim Chissano as premier. In the two weeks that followed, 25,000 whites left Mozambique, about 10% of the white population. Many moved to South Africa, Portugal, or Rhodesia. In a statement published in the newspaper Noticias, Chissano tried to stem the white flight, telling those who were not responsible for the violence that they were welcome to return. In 1974, Alberto Massavanhane was appointed by the transitional government as the first black mayor of Lourenço Marques. During the transitional period, frequent strikes at the city's port were held in protest, which FRELIMO put down forcefully.

=== After independence ===
On 25 June 1975, the People's Republic of Mozambique was proclaimed in accordance with the Lusaka Accord. In Lourenço Marques, independence was celebrated with a parade and state banquet. Dozens of statues of historical Portuguese figures, including those of Vasco da Gama and Lourenço Marques, were taken down. In addition, many of the city's institutions and streets, originally named for heroes or important dates in Portuguese history, had their names changed to African languages, revolutionary figures, or pre-colonial historic names. Many were named for socialist and anti-colonial leaders, including Kim Il Sung, Friedrich Engels, Julius Nyerere, Patrice Lumumba, and Robert Mugabe.

White residents of Mozambique, a large portion of whom resided in the capital, were given a 90-day period to accept Mozambican citizenship and stay, or to leave the country. Most decided to leave: in April 1974 there were 220,000 whites, including 80,000 soldiers; but by July 1975, 55,000 civilians plus all the troops had left, leaving just 85,000 whites in the country. In Maputo specifically, white neighborhoods lost an average of one-third of their residents; some areas lost as many as half. Most of the whites who chose to leave were only allowed to take one suitcase each and $150 worth of escudos. As the white elites left, the city (and the country as a whole) suffered from human capital flight. At the port, efficiency declined 80% and pilferage doubled in the year after independence. In response, there was discussion of potentially sending armed troops to force improved efficiency, possibly at gunpoint.

Long live FRELIMO! Long live the people of the Province of Maputo! Do we say Lourenço Marques? ... Are you from Lourenço Marques? No. So what is the name we are going to give to our province? ... What are we going to say is the name of our capital? So? After hearing many opinions about this, I will say Lourenço Marques is no longer Lourenço Marques. The capital is named Maputo. At 9:35 today, Lourenço Marques died; our capital is called Maputo. Province of Maputo, capital Maputo.

— Samora Machel, at a rally on 3 February 1976

In 1975, it was expected that the city would soon be renamed Can Phumo, or "Place of Phumo", after a Shangaan chief who lived in the area before Lourenço Marques first visited the site in 1544. However, in a rally on the morning of 3 February 1976, President Samora Machel announced that city would be renamed Maputo, after the nearby Maputo River. The name "Maputo" was also significant in the anti-colonial struggle; a popular FRELIMO slogan went, "Viva Moçambique unido, do Rovuma ao Maputo" ("Long live Mozambique, united from Rovuma to Maputo").

In 1976, nationalization of private businesses occurred in Maputo, and the following year, the Bank of Mozambique and the Mozambican Youth Organisation became headquartered in the city. In February 1977, Maputo hosted the African Conference on Cinema. In 1978, the city's Câmara Municipal (city council) form of government was replaced by the Conselho Executivo (executive council). In 1980, the city was granted provincial status, removing it from Maputo Province.

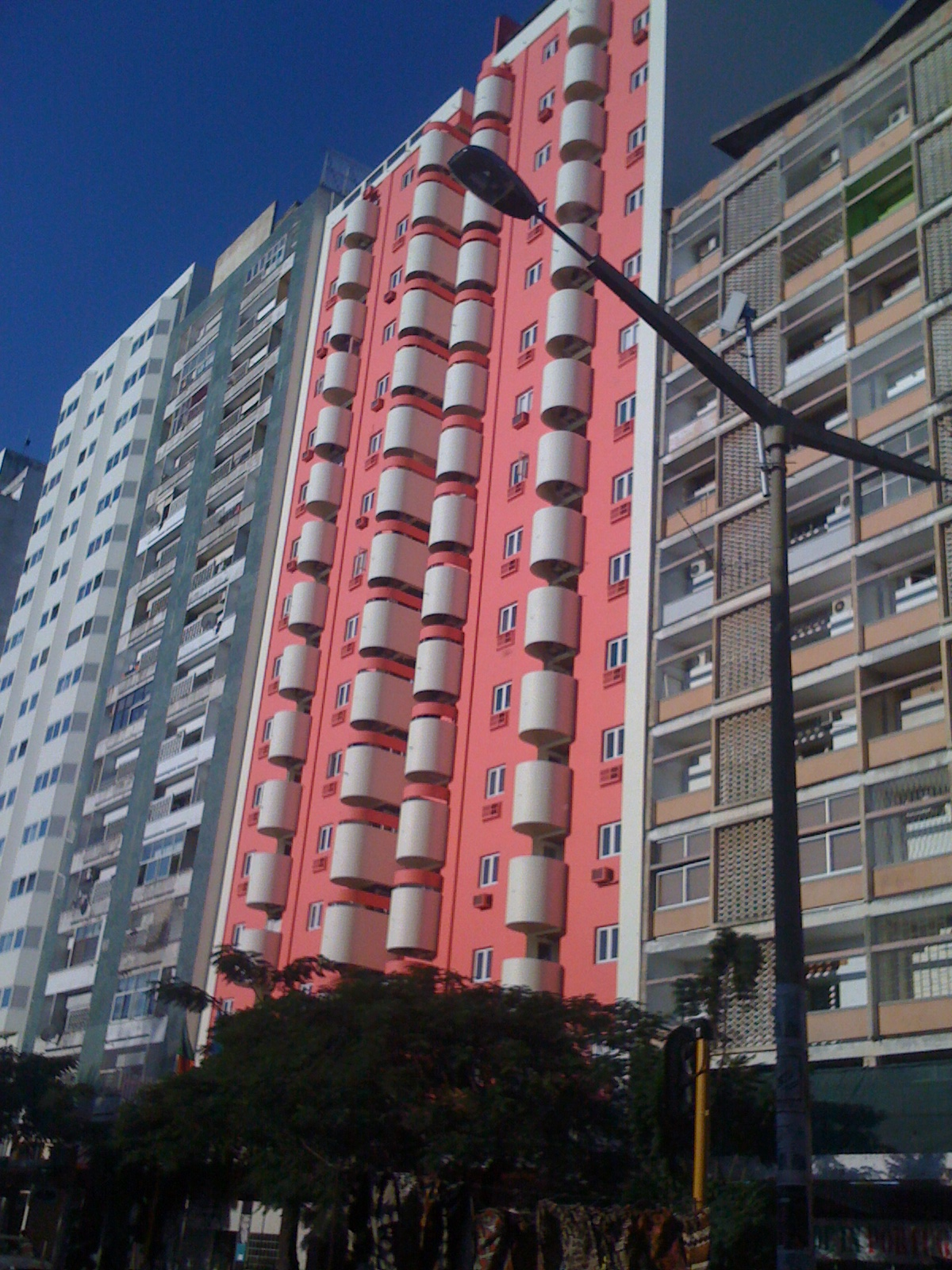
Central Maputo

Starting shortly after independence, the country was plagued by the Mozambican Civil War, a long and violent struggle between FRELIMO and RENAMO, which lasted from 1977 to 1992. The war adversely affected economic activity and political stability in the city. Tourism, once a boon to the economy, all but disappeared. "Operation Production" (Operação Produção) was inaugurated in 1983 by the ruling FRELIMO party to deal with the economic crisis. The city's so-described "parasitic" population, which included jobless and undocumented residents as well as criminals, were forcibly transferred to state-owned communal farms and villages in the rural north of Mozambique. By 1990, the city's population had reached 776,000.

Since the peace agreement ending the civil war, which was signed in 1992, the country and the city has returned to its pre-independence levels of political stability. In 1996, the Maputo Development Corridor was launched, expanding Maputo's economic links with the Gauteng, Limpopo, and Mpumalanga provinces of South Africa. In 1997, the city had a population of 966,837. In 2000, the city, which by this point counted 1,096,00 residents, was struck by a massive flood. In July 2000, Maputo hosted the Community of Portuguese Language Countries summit. Today, the Maputo port has recovered and can now handle multiple ships at once. Maputo's economy today centers around the port, with other industries including brewing, shipbuilding and repair, fish canning, ironwork, and cement and textile manufacturing.

== See also ==
- Timeline of Maputo
