= Timeline of Maputo =

The following is a timeline of the history of the city of Maputo, Mozambique (until 1976 known as Lourenço Marques).

== Prior to 20th century ==
- 1544 - Portuguese Lourenço Marques explores Maputo Bay.
- 1787 - Fortress built by Portuguese.
- 1885 - Vasco de Gama Gardens laid out.
- 1892 - O Commercio de Lourenço Marques begins publication.
- 1895 - Pretoria-Lourenço Marques railway built.
- 1898 - Capital of Portuguese Mozambique moves to Lourenço Marques from the Island of Mozambique.

== 20th century ==
- 1904
  - Trams begin operating.
  - Population: 9,849.
- 1912 - Population: 13,353.
- 1916 - Central Train Station built.
- 1918 - O Brado Africano begins publication.
- 1922 - Hotel Polano built.
- 1934 - Arquivo Historico de Moçambique headquartered in city.
- 1935 - Population: 47,390 (estimate).
- 1940 - Maputo Airport terminal built.
- 1944 - Cathedral of Our Lady of the Immaculate Conception built.
- 1950 - Population: 93,516.
- 1955 - Sport Lourenço Marques e Benfica formed.
- 1958 - Mozambique Grand Prix was held for the first time.
- 1961 - National Library of Mozambique established.
- 1962 - Estudos Gerais Universitários de Moçambique established.
- 1968 - Estádio Salazar inaugurated in Matola.

=== 1970s-1990s ===
- 1970
  - Tempo magazine begins publication.
  - Population: 383,775 urban agglomeration.
- 1974 - 24 September: Mozambique Liberation Front in power.
- 1974 - Alberto Massavanhane designated by FRELIMO as the first President of the Executive Council
- 1975 - City becomes part of the People's Republic of Mozambique.
- 1976
  - 3 February: City renamed "Maputo."
  - Nationalization occurs.
- 1977
  - Bank of Mozambique, Mozambican Youth Organisation, and Centro Nacional de Documentação e Informação de Moçambique headquartered in city.
  - February: City hosts African Conference on Cinema.
- 1978 - City administration by "Câmara Municipal" (city council) replaced by "Conselho Executivo" (executive council).
- 1980
  - City granted provincial status.
  - António Hama Thay becomes president of city executive council.
- 1982 - Gaspar Horácio Mateus Zimba becomes president of city executive council.
- 1983
  - "Jobless" moved from city.
  - 23 May: Attack by South African Air Force.
  - Alberto Massavanhane becomes president of city executive council.
- 1985 - City joins the newly formed União das Cidades Capitais Luso-Afro-Américo-Asiáticas.
- 1987
  - 7 September: Prisoner exchange.
  - João Baptista Cosme becomes president of city executive council.
- 1989 - Brazilian Cultural Center opens.
- 1990
  - Liga Muçulmana de Maputo football club founded.
  - Population: 776,000 (urban agglomeration).
- 1993 - Fórum Mulher founded.
- 1996
  - Maputo Development Corridor launched.
  - Instituto Camões-Centro Cultural Português opens.
- 1997
  - Artur Hussene Canana becomes president of city executive council.
  - Population: 966,837.
- 2000
  - Flood.
  - July: City hosts Community of Portuguese Language Countries summit.
  - Population: 1,096,000 (urban agglomeration).

== 21st century ==
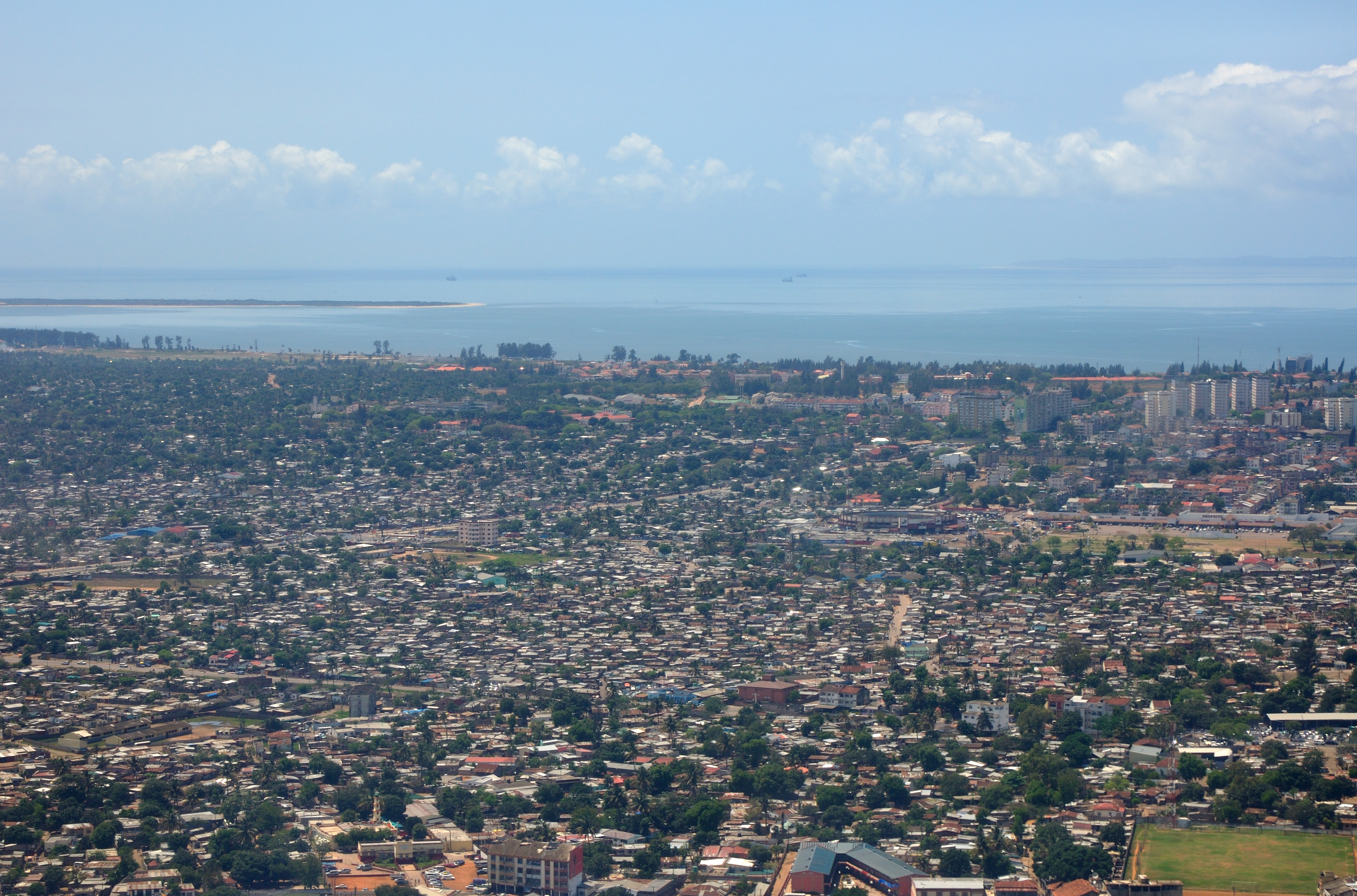
Aerial view of Maputo, 2010

- 2003
  - Maputo Port Development Company established.
  - July: City hosts African Union assembly.
  - Eneas da Conceição Comiche becomes president of municipal council.
- 2006 - Dockanema film festival begins.
- 2007
  - Promaputo city infrastructure project launched.
  - 22 March: Arms depot explosion.
  - Population: 1,111,638 (city); 1,766,184 (urban agglomeration).
- 2008 - February: Economic riots.
- 2009 - David Simango becomes president of municipal council.
- 2010
  - Maputo International Airport terminal opens.
  - September: Economic unrest.
- 2011
  - Estádio do Zimpeto inaugurated.
  - September: City hosts 2011 All-Africa Games.
- 2012 - Maputo Private Hospital inaugurated.
- 2013 - Aga Khan Academy established.
- 2015 - Population: 1,241,702 (estimate).
- 2017 - 2017 Lusophony Games to be held in Maputo.

== See also ==
- History of Maputo
- List of newspapers in Maputo
- Portuguese Empire
- Timeline of Beira, Mozambique

== Bibliography ==
=== Published in 19th century ===
- "Lourenço Marques". Elementos para um diccionario chorographico da provincia de Mozambique (in Portuguese). Lisboa: Sociedade de Geografia de Lisboa. 1889.
- "Water-Gate of the Transvaal". Chambers' Journal. London. 1895.

=== Published in 20th century ===
- A. Samler Brown; G. Gordon Brown, eds. (1906), "Lourenço Marques", Guide to South Africa (14th ed.), London: Sampson, Low, Marston & Co.
- "Lorenzo Marquez". Brockhaus' Konversations-Lexikon (in German) (14th ed.). Leipzig: Brockhaus. 1908.
- "Lourenço Marques, Portuguese East Africa". International Directory of Buyers and Sellers. Chicago: International Trade Developer Inc. 1922.
- António Rita-Ferreira (1968). "Os Africanos de Lourenço Marques". Memórias do Instituto de Investigação Científica de Moçambique (in Portuguese). 9: 165–222. ISSN 0076-1184. "Série C"
- Jeanne Penvenne (1979), Forced labor and the origin of an African working class: Lourenço Marques, 1870-1962, Brookline, Massachusetts: Boston University African Studies Center
- Carlos Alberto Medeiros [in German] (1980). "Maputo antes da independência, Geografia de uma cidade colonial". Finisterra (in Portuguese). 15 (30). Centro de Estudos Geográficos da Universidade de Lisboa. doi:10.18055/Finis2209. ISSN 0430-5027.
- E. Medeiros (1989). "L'evolution Demographique de la Ville de Lourenco Marques (1894-1975)". In M. Cahen (ed.). Bourgs et Villes en Afrique Lusophone (in French).
- M. C. Mendes (1989). "Les repercussions de l'independence sur la ville de Maputo". In M. Cahen (ed.). Bourgs et Villes en Afrique Lusophone (in French).
- Jeremy Grest (1995). "Urban Management, Local Government Reform and the Democratisation Process in Mozambique: Maputo City 1975-1990". Journal of Southern African Studies. 21 (1): 147–164. doi:10.1080/03057079508708438. JSTOR 2637336.
- Jeanne Marie Penvenne (1995). African workers and colonial racism: Mozambican strategies and struggles in Lourenço Marques, 1877-1962. London: James Currey. ISBN 0435089528.
- JoAnn McGregor (1998). "Violence and Social Change in a Border Economy: War in the Maputo Hinterland, 1984-1992". Journal of Southern African Studies. 24.
- Paul Jenkins (1999), Maputo city: The historical roots of under-development and the consequences in urban form, Edinburgh College of Art/Heriot-Watt University, School of Planning and Housing, OCLC 42874930, "Research paper n°71"

=== Published in 21st century ===
- Fredrik Söderbaum; Ian Taylor (2001). "Transmission Belt for Transnational Capital or Facilitator for Development? Problematising the Role of the State in the Maputo Development Corridor". Journal of Modern African Studies. 39.
- Jeanne-Marie Penvenne (2002). "'A xikomo xa lomu, iku tira': Citadines africaines à Lourenço Marques (Mozambique), 1945-1975". Le Mouvement social (in French) (204). Paris. doi:10.3917/lms.204.0081 – via Cairn.info.
- M.A. El-Khawas (2003). "Maputo, Mozambique". In Dickson Eyoh; Paul Tiyambe Zeleza (eds.). Encyclopedia of Twentieth-Century African History. Routledge. ISBN 0415234794.
- Kwame Anthony Appiah and Henry Louis Gates, ed. (2005). "Maputo". Africana: The Encyclopedia of the African and African American Experience (2nd ed.). Oxford University Press. p. 726+. ISBN 978-0-19-517055-9.
- Kevin Shillington, ed. (2005). "Maputo". Encyclopedia of African History. Fitzroy Dearborn. ISBN 978-1-57958-245-6.
- Illegitimacy of Democracy? Democratisation and Alienation in Maputo, Mozambique, London: Crisis States Research Centre, 2007 – via International Relations and Security Network
- Nationalism, Urban Poverty and Identity in Maputo, Mozambique, London: Crisis States Research Centre, 2010 – via International Relations and Security Network
- P. Jenkins (2011), "Maputo and Luanda", in Simon Bekker and Goran Therborn (ed.), Capital Cities in Africa: Power and Powerlessness, Dakar: Council for the Development of Social Science Research in Africa, ISBN 978-2-8697-8495-6
- Paulo Tormenta Pinto & Ana Vaz Milheiro (2012), From Monumentality To Diversity – Maputo Between The Urban Plans Of Aguiar & Azevedo (1950—1970) – via International Planning History Society
- Carlos Nunes Silva, ed. (2015). Urban Planning in Lusophone African Countries. UK: Ashgate. ISBN 978-1472444882. (Includes articles about Maputo)
- Vanessa de Pacheco Melo (2016). "Production of Urban Peripheries For and By Low-Income Populations at the Turn of the Millennium: Maputo, Luanda and Johannesburg". Journal of Southern African Studies. 42 (4).
- Sandra Roque; et al. (2016). "Subúrbios and Cityness: Exploring Imbrications and Urbanity in Maputo, Mozambique". Journal of Southern African Studies. 42 (4).
