= List of Mozambicans =

This is a list of notable people from Mozambique.

== Actors and filmmakers ==
- Arlete Bombe, actress
- Alberto Magassela, actor
- Rogério Manjate, actor, writer and film director
- Gilberto Mendes, actor
- Lucrécia Paco, actress

== Musicians ==
- Eldevina Materula, oboist and music teacher
- Yen Sung, House music DJ, vocalist, music producer

== Politicians ==
- Esperança Bias, former Minister of Mineral Resources
- Joaquim Chissano, first Prime Minister of Mozambique
- Josina Machel, political activist and first wife of Samora Machel
- Graca Machel, political activist and second wife of Samora Machel
- Samora Machel, first President of Mozambique
- Alberto Massavanhane, first Mayor of Maputo and Mozambican Diplomat
- Eduardo Mondlane, founder and first president of FRELIMO
- Janet Mondlane, anti-apartheid activist and wife to Eduardo Mondlane
- Carmelita Namashulua, Minister of Education and Human Development for Mozambique
- Francisco Songane, Minister of Health

== Sportspeople ==
- Maria Mutola, World and Olympic track and field athlete winner
- Alfons Amade footballer
- Reinildo footballer
- Geny Catamo footballer

== Writers ==
- Mia Couto
- Tânia Tomé

== See also ==
- Lists of people by nationality - similar lists for other countries
