= Statue of Samora Machel =

Statue in Maputo, Mozambique, built in 2011

Samora Machel Statue
- Location within Mozambique
- Artist: Mansudae Overseas Projects
- Year: 19 October 2011
- Type: statue
- Medium: bronze
- Dimensions: 9.5 m (31 ft)
- Location: Maputo; 25°58′09″S 32°34′24″E

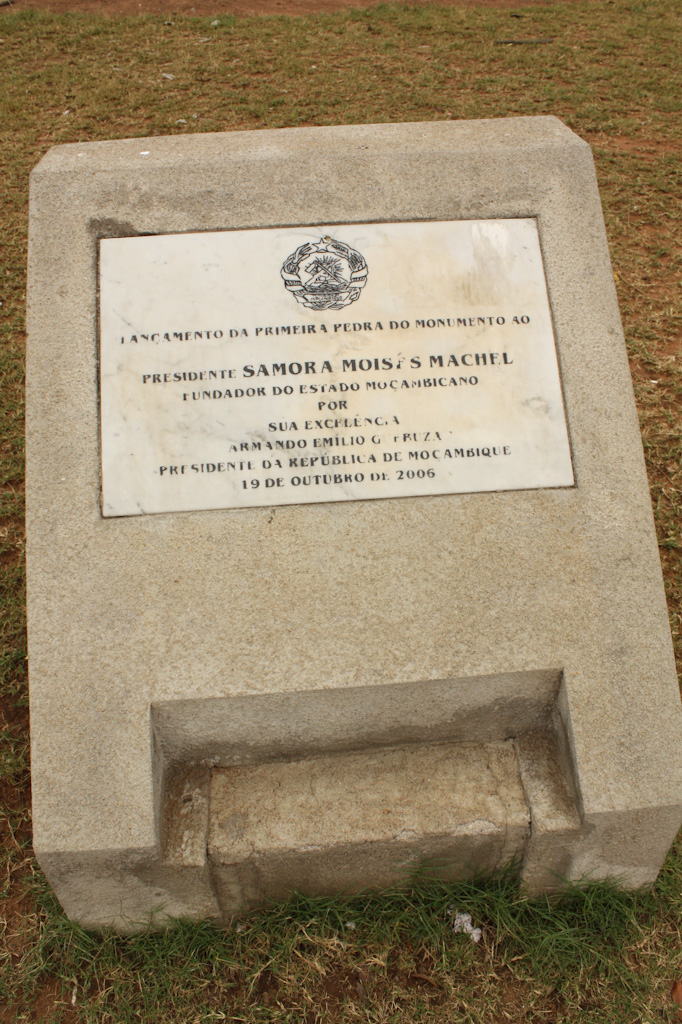

The Samora Machel Statue (Portuguese: A Estátua de Samora Machel) is a bronze sculpture located in the center of Praça da Independência in Maputo, Mozambique. The statue depicts Samora Machel (1933-1986), military, revolutionary, and the first president of Mozambique.

The statue was designed and constructed in Pyongyang, North Korea, by the Mansudae Overseas Projects, an arm of the Mansudae Art Studio. It stands 9 metres (30 ft) and weighs 4.8 tons. The statue sits on a marble slab 2.7 metres (8.9 ft) high at the head of Samora Machel Avenue, and is illuminated at night. The statue has been criticized for bearing little resemblance to Samora. The Samora Machel Statue sits in front of Maputo City Hall on the spot formerly occupied by a statue of Joaquim Augusto Mouzinho de Albuquerque, Governor-General of Portuguese Mozambique from 1896 to 1897.

The statue was inaugurated on October 19, 2011, the 25th anniversary of Machel's death in an aircraft crash on the convergence of the borders of Mozambique, Swaziland and South Africa. Armando Guebuza, the president of Mozambique, led the construction of the statue and its inauguration ceremony, which was attended by numerous foreign dignitaries.

A smaller statue of Samora Machel sits at the entrance of the Tunduru Gardens.
