= Praça da Independência =

Public square in Maputo, Mozambique

- Independence Square
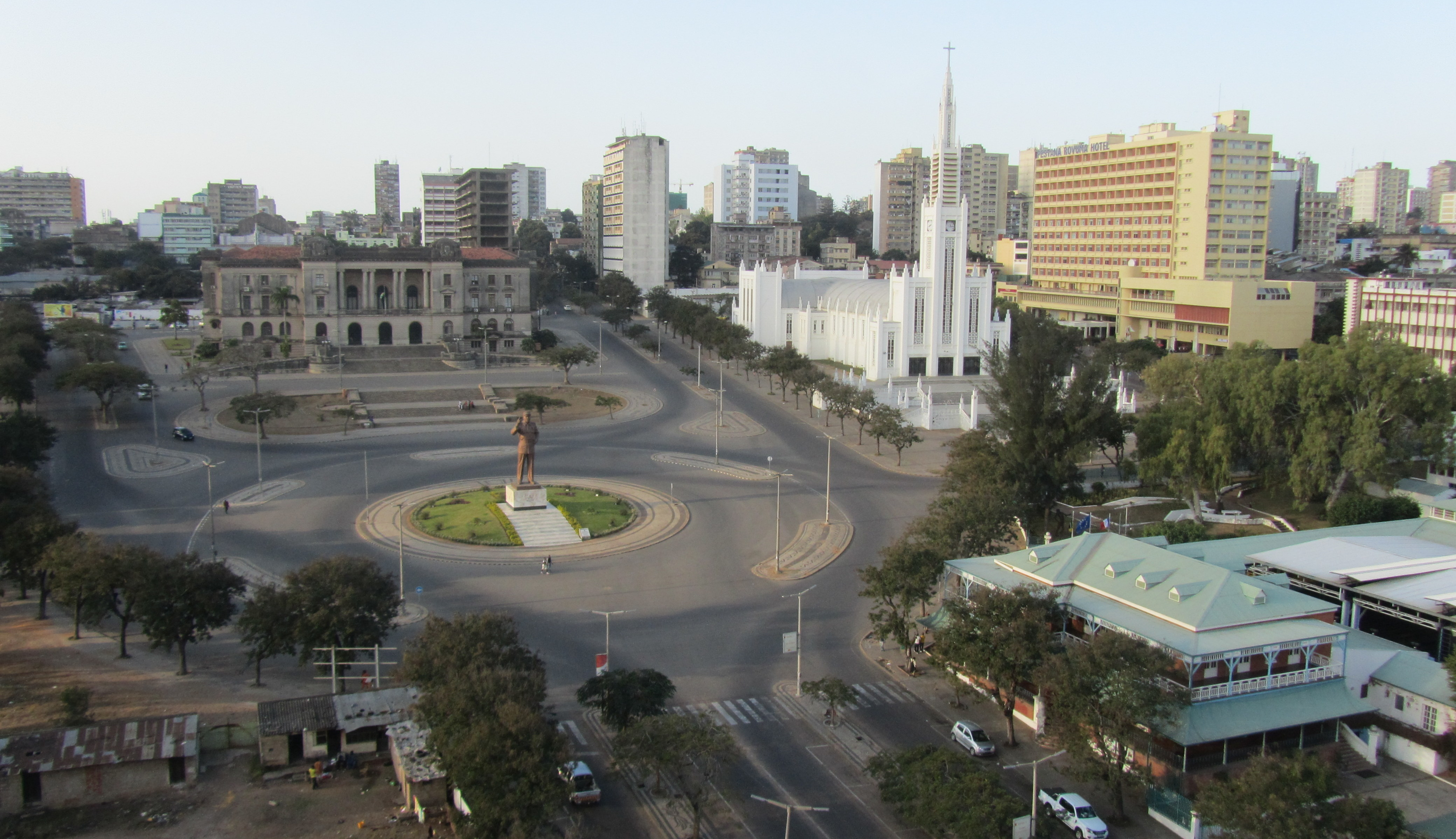
- Interactive map of Praça da Independência
- Location: Maputo, Mozambique
- Coordinates: 25.9691°S 32.5732°E

Praça da Independência (English: Independence Square) is a public square and focal point of Maputo, Mozambique. It was built by the Portuguese as Praça Mouzinho de Albuquerque (Mouzinho de Albuquerque Square) and was dominated by a statue of Mouzinho de Albuquerque, the former governor-general of Portuguese Mozambique. The statue of Mouzinho on horseback was inaugurated in 1940. After the independence of Mozambique in 1975 the square was renamed Praça da Independência, and the statue of Mouzinho de Albuquerque was removed to Fortaleza de Nossa Senhora da Conceição and replaced by a statue of Samora Machel (1933-1986), the first president of Mozambique. The square is now dominated by the much larger Samora Machel Statue, which was built and dedicated in 2011.

Praça da Independência is flanked to the north by the Maputo City Hall and to the east by Cathedral of Our Lady of the Immaculate Conception. Iron House, designed by Gustave Eiffel for the governor of Mozambique, is located just off the square. Tunduru Gardens, designed in 1885 by British gardener Thomas Honney, is located one block south of the square.
