= Ricardo Rangel (photojournalist) =

Mozambican photojournalist and photographer (1924–2009)

- Born: 15 February 1924; Lourenço Marques, Portuguese East Africa
- Died: 11 June 2009 (aged 85); Maputo, Mozambique
- Occupation(s): Photojournalist and photographer

Ricardo Achiles Rangel (15 February 1924 – 11 June 2009) was a Mozambican photojournalist and photographer.

== Biography ==
=== Early life ===
Rangel was born in the city of Lourenço Marques, now known as Maputo, capital of Mozambique, in February 1924. His father was a Greek businessman and Rangel was of African, European and Chinese descent. Rangel was raised by his African grandmother in the impoverished suburbs surrounding Lourenço Marques, while he visited his parents in the outlying provinces.

=== Career ===
Rangel's photography career began during the early 1940s by developing pictures in a private studio. Interest in taking photographs soon followed. Rangel was hired as the first non-white employee to join the Mozambican newspaper Noticias de Tarde in 1952, where he worked as a photographer. Rangel moved to Noticias de Tarde's sister publication, Notícias, in 1956.

He next became the head photographer at the Lourenço Marques daily newspaper A Tribuna, from 1960 until 1964. Rangel moved to the city of Beira during the mid-1960s. He worked as a photographer for several Beira-based newspapers including Diário de Moçambique, Voz Africana and Notícias da Beira. He returned to the city of Lourenço Marques during the late 1960s and returned to Notícias.

Rangel joined with four other Mozambican journalists in 1970 to found a weekly magazine called Tempo, which in effect acted as the only publication in opposition to Portuguese rule. Additionally, Tempo was also Mozambique's first full color magazine. Rangel worked as Tempo's main photojournalist, often documenting poverty or Portuguese policies which were perceived as unfair by the publication.

Many of Rangel's colonial era photographs were banned or destroyed by Portuguese government censors, and could not be published or exhibited until Mozambique's independence in 1975. He became a frequent target of the Portuguese secret police, the PIDE.

Mozambique gained independence from Portugal in 1975. Rangel took an active role in training new Mozambican photographers throughout the post-independence era and Mozambican Civil War. He was appointed the chief photographer of Noticias in 1977, after most other photojournalists had left the country following Mozambique's independence.

Rangel became the first director of the weekly Mozambican publication Domingo in 1981. He went on to found the Photographic Training Centre, school for photography, in Maputo in 1983 and remained the centre's director until his death in 2009. Rangel began showing his work in European and African art galleries and museums beginning in 1983.

Rangel also founded the Mozambican Photography Association, serving as the organisation's first chairman. He was later bestowed the title of Life President by members of the association and remained the aaosciation's

In 2008, Rangel was awarded an honorary doctorate in social science for his "contribution to Mozambican culture" from Eduardo Mondlane University, which is Mozambique's oldest and largest university.

Additionally, Rangel was elected to the Maputo Municipal Assembly from 1998 to 2003 as a member of the Juntos Pela Cidade (Together for the City).

=== Death ===
Rangel died in his sleep at his home in Maputo, Mozambique, on 11 June 2009, at the age of 85. He was survived by his Swiss wife, Beatrice. Rangel's funeral, which was held at Maputo City Hall on 15 June 2009, was attended by several dignitaries, including Prime Minister Luisa Diogo. Jazz music was played at the funeral according to his wishes, as Rangel was a fan of jazz. He was buried in the Lhanguene cemetery in Maputo.

Prime Minister Luisa Diogo praised Rangel's life and career at his funeral, noting that Rangel left "an indelible mark on the history of Mozambique." She also praised Rangel's colony era work which was used "to denounce colonial dictatorship", and pointed out that many of Rangel's photographs had been banned until Mozambique's independence.

Joao Costa, the head of the Mozambican Photographic Association (AMF), spoke of Rangel saying, "the man has died, but his work remains".

== Movie ==
The movie Ricardo Rangel – Hot Iron, the director Licínio de Azevedo is a film designed the Instituto Camões in Luanda as part of the cycle CPLP Film Festival which takes place in the Angolan capital of the 10th day 16 September 2009.

Organized by the embassies of the CPLP countries accredited in Angola, the cycle includes the display of five films of Portugal, Brazil, Cabo Verde, Mozambique and Angola second source of Embassy of Mozambique in Luanda, contacted by AIM in Lisbon. The film, lasting 52 minutes, is a documentary 80 years of Ricardo Rangel, 60 of which were dedicated to photography, directed by Licinio de Azevedo and co-produced by Camilo de Sousa and Ebano Multimédia. It was filmed and completed a few months before the death of Rangel, on 11 June 2009

=== Synopsis ===
Ricardo Rangel, photographer, 80 years of age, is the living symbol of the generation that in the late 40 started the first complaints against the colonial situation. While photographing the city of the settlers, Ricardo showed the inhumanity and cruelty of colonialism. From then until the end of civil war after independence, Ricardo photographed 60 years of history of Mozambique. In this movie, Ricardo takes us on his life and work, where the city of Maputo, the bohemian and jazz have a special place

== Collections ==
Rangel's work is held in the following public collections:

- The Art Institute of Chicago, Chicago, Illinois: 2 items
