= Arquivo Histórico de Moçambique =

The Arquivo Histórico de Moçambique (est. 1934) serves as the national archives of Mozambique. In 1939 it was designated the official "Arquivo do Governo da Colónia" and after independence from Portugal in 1975 became the repository of records of the Republic of Mozambique. Since 1976 the Universidade Eduardo Mondlane in Maputo oversees it.

The archives contributes to the operation of the Sistema Nacional de Arquivos (est. 1992) and its successor, the Sistema Nacional de Arquivos de Estado of the Ministério da Função Pública (est. 2007). It also produces a journal.

== See also ==
- Arquivo Histórico Ultramarino, Lisbon
- Lista de arquivos públicos nos países de língua portuguesa (List of public archives in Portuguese-speaking countries)
- Biblioteca Nacional de Moçambique (national library)
- History of Mozambique
