= List of newspapers in Mozambique =

This is a list of newspapers in Mozambique.

== List of newspapers ==
Newspaper	Location	First issued	Publisher	Website	Notes
Beira Post	Beira	1898			In English and Portuguese
Campeao	Maputo				
Canal de Mozambique	Maputo		Imprensa Livra-te	Website	Last edition: 13th May 2013
Correio da Manhã	Maputo				
Correio Semanal	Maputo				
Demos	Maputo				
Desafio	Maputo				
Diario de Mocambique	Beira				
Domingo	Maputo				
Expresso da Tarde	Maputo				
Fim de Samana	Maputo				
Notícias	Maputo		Rede da Criança	Website	
O Popular					
Savana	Maputo				
Tempo	Maputo				
Zambeze	Maputo				

== See also ==
- Media of Mozambique
