= Timeline of Beira, Mozambique =

The following is a timeline of the history of the city of Beira, Mozambique.

== 19th century ==
- 1891 – Beira established by Portuguese colonial Companhia de Moçambique.
- 1898 – Umtali-Beira railway begins operating.
- 1899 – Salisbury-Beira railway begins operating.

== 20th century ==
- 1920 – Gorongosa Hunting Reserve created in vicinity of Beira.
- 1924 – Clube Ferroviário da Beira (football club) formed.
- 1925 – Catholic Our Lady of the Rosary church built.
- 1940 – Roman Catholic diocese of Beira established.
- 1941 – Beira becomes part of Portuguese East Africa.
- 1943 – Atlético Desportivo Moma, Estrella Beira, and GD da Companhia Têxtil do Punguè football clubs formed.
- 1946 – City expansion plan created by José Porto and Ribeiro Alegre.
- 1952 – Beira Airport opens.
- 1954 – Grande Hotel Beira and Cine-Teatro São Jorge (cinema) in business.
- 1955 – Liceu Pêro de Anaia (school) established.
- 1965 – Estação Ferroviária da Beira (railway station) and Associação Comercial building constructed.
- 1970 – Population: 113,770.
- 1975 – Beira becomes part of newly independent Mozambique.
- 1980 – Population: 230,744.
- 1988 – September: Catholic pope visits city.
- 1997 – Population: 412,588.
- 1998 – Chivavice Muchangage becomes mayor.
- 2000
  - February: Cyclone Leon–Eline occurs.
  - February–March: 2000 Mozambique flood occurs.

== 21st century ==
- 2003 – Daviz Simango becomes mayor.
- 2006 – Municipiobeira.gov.mz website launched (approximate date).
- 2015 – Population: 460,904 (estimate).

== See also ==
- Beira history
- Timeline of Maputo
- History of Mozambique

== Bibliography ==
- Ilídio do Amaral [in Portuguese] (1969). "Beira, cidade e porto do Índico" [Beira, city and port of the Indian Ocean]. Finisterra (in Portuguese). 4 (7). doi:10.18055/Finis2492. ISSN 0430-5027.
- Eric Young (2005). "Beira, Mozambique". In Kwame Anthony Appiah and Henry Louis Gates (ed.). Africana: The Encyclopedia of the African and African American Experience (2nd ed.). Oxford University Press. p. 413. ISBN 978-0-19-517055-9.
- Guy Arnold (2005). "Beira Corridor". In Kevin Shillington (ed.). Encyclopedia of African History. Fitzroy Dearborn. ISBN 978-1-57958-245-6.

== Images ==
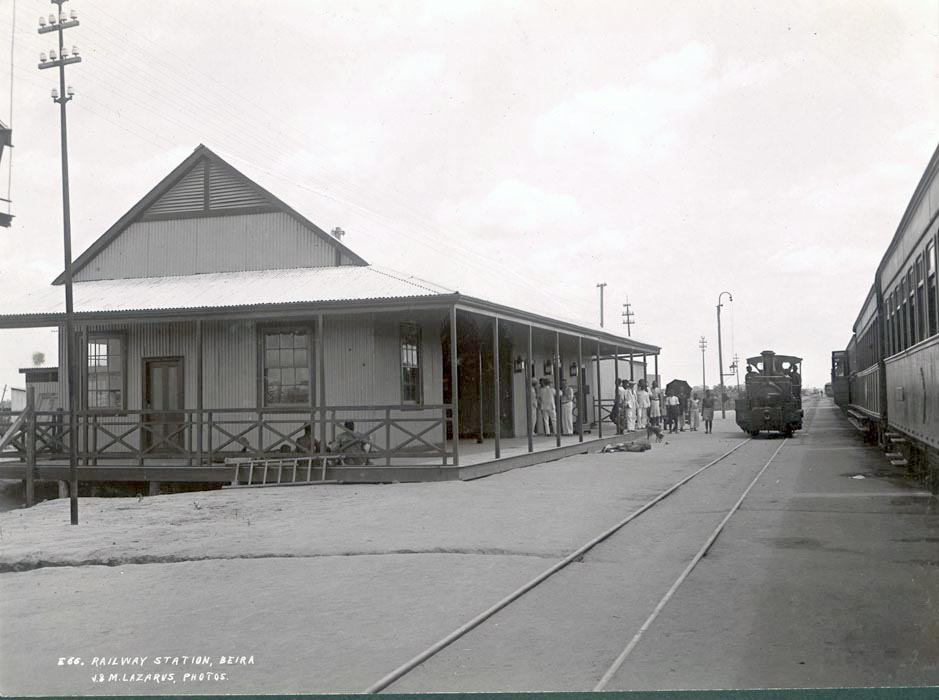
Railway station, Beira, built 1890s? (photo 1902)

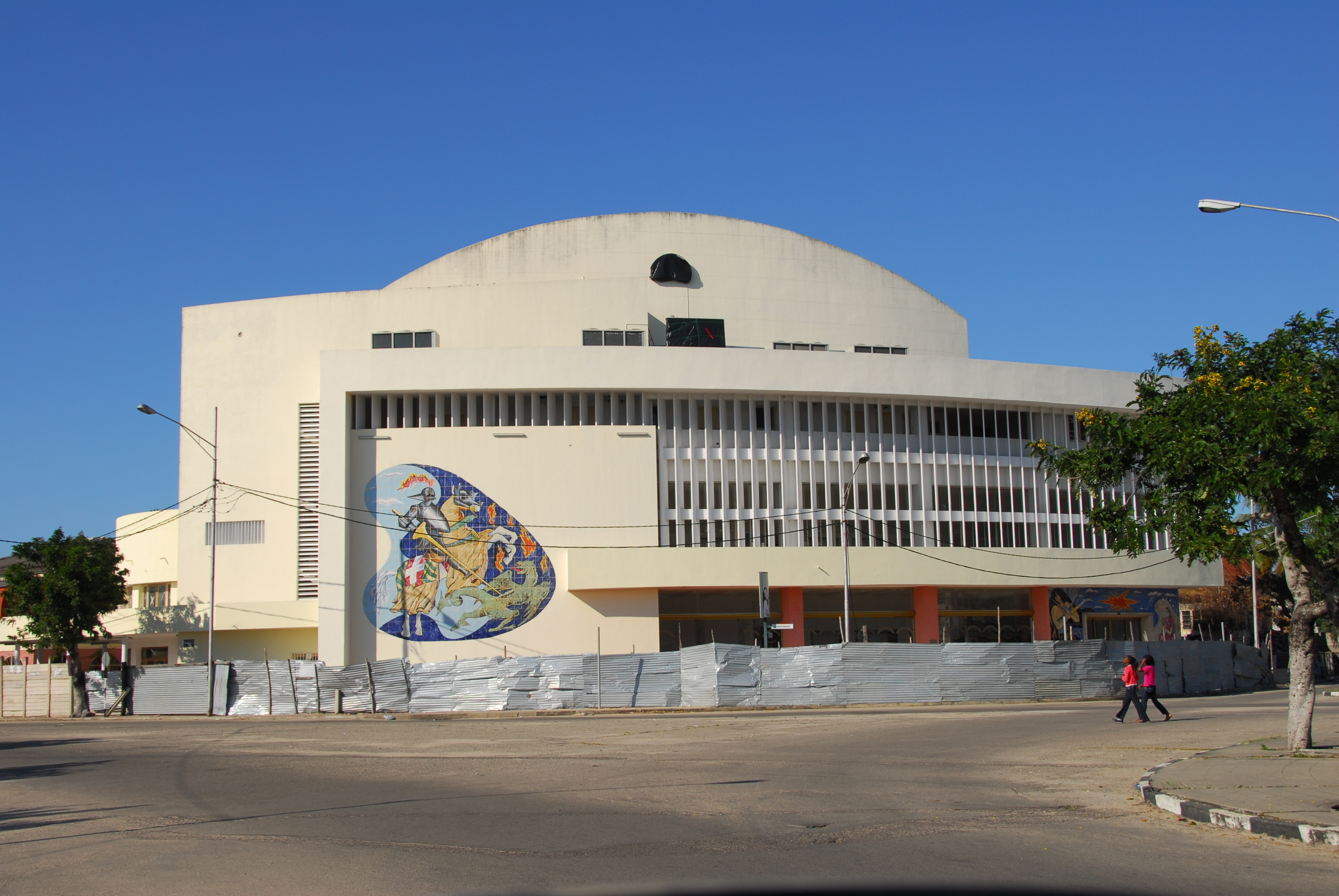
Cinema São Jorge Beira, opened 1954 (photo 2011)

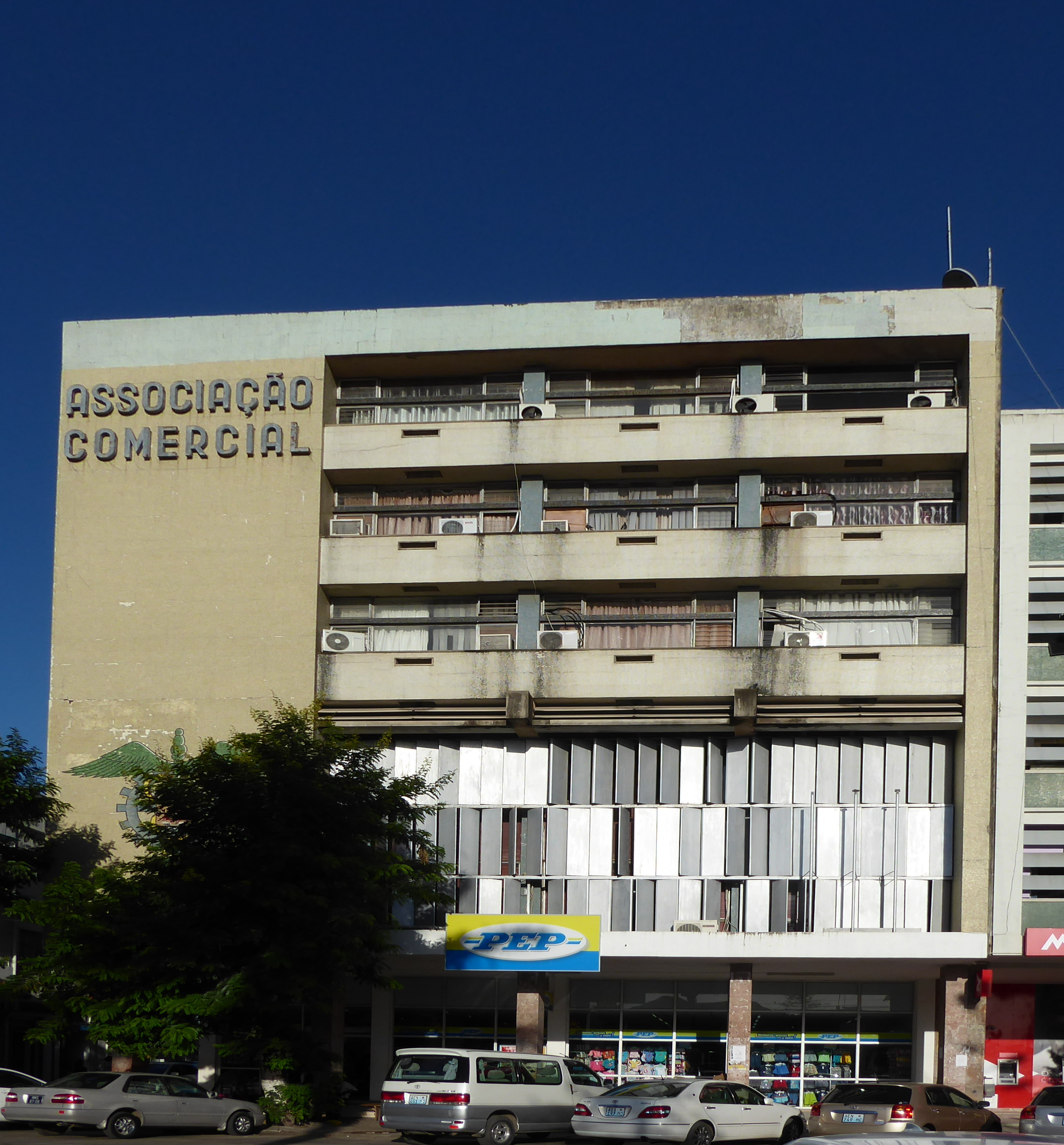
Associação Comercial building, constructed 1965 (photo 2016)
