= Maputo Central Railway Station =

Train station in Mozambique

Coordinates: 25.9711°S 32.5645°E

Central Railway Station
- Estação Central dos Caminhos de Ferro
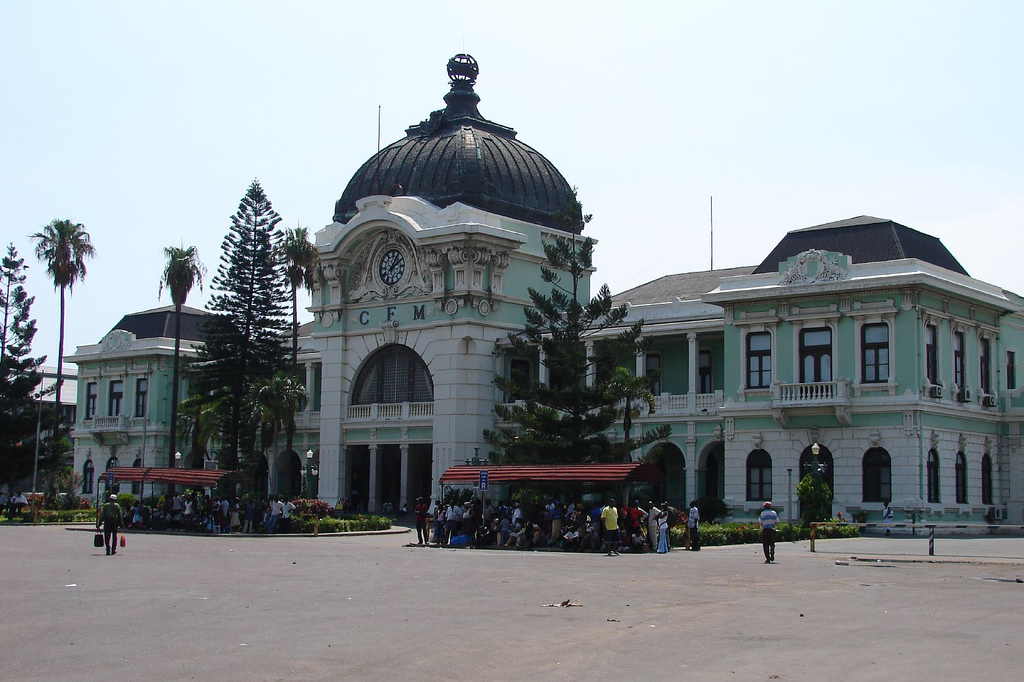
- Interactive map of the Central Railway Station area

General information
- Architectural style: Beaux-Arts
- Location: Workers' Square, Maputo, Mozambique
- Construction started: 1908
- Completed: 1916
- Inaugurated: 19 March 1910
- Cost: $400,000

Height
- Height: 51 m (167 ft)

Technical details
- Floor count: 2

Design and construction
- Architects: Mario Veiga; José Ferreira da Costa; Alfredo Lisboa de Lima
- Architecture firm: Evans & Plows
- Main contractor: Buccellato e Irmão; Pietro Buffa Buccellato

The Central Railway Station (Portuguese: Estação Central dos Caminhos de Ferro) is a historic railway station in Maputo, Mozambique. Administered by Mozambique Ports and Railways, it is located on the CFM Sul line (now closed), which links to South Africa, Eswatini, and Zimbabwe. It was constructed from 1908 to 1916 in the Beaux-Arts style. Widely recognized for its attractiveness, the station has been ranked by international publications as one of the world's most beautiful.

== History ==
The first train station in Maputo, then known as Lourenço Marques, was a modest structure, built of wood and zinc, and inaugurated in 1895 by Paul Kruger, President of the South African Republic. Plans to construct the current railway station to replace the old one date to 1904. The Caminhos de Ferro de Moçambique, the parastatal agency overseeing railroads in Portuguese Mozambique, included $400,000 in its 1906–1907 budget for the construction of the new station. Initial plans were drawn up by Mario Veiga, a government architect at the Directorate of Public Works, along with Alfredo Augusto Lisboa de Lima. In 1906, the plans and budget were sent to the Portuguese government in Lisbon for approval. There, significant changes to the plans were made. The final plans provided for a building that was architecturally inspired by the main terminus in Johannesburg, but with a grander facade.

The long, metal railway platform was inaugurated on 19 March 1907. Construction on the building began in 1908. The project was overseen by the firm Buccellato e Irmão. The station, built of baked brick and cement, was inaugurated on 19 March 1910, in an informal ceremony attended by Governor-General Alfredo Augusto Freire de Andrade. Work on the building resumed in 1913 with a project to adorn the facade and construct the dome. The dome, often incorrectly attributed to Gustave Eiffel, was in fact designed by José Ferreira da Costa and executed by the Johannesburg-based firm Evans & Plows. Production of the dome was carried out in South Africa, rather than the United Kingdom, due to difficulties imposed by the ongoing World War I. The ornamentation of the building's facade was designed and executed by Pietro Buffa Buccellato. The second phase of construction, including the new dome and facade, was completed in 1916.

On 19 March 2010, the Central Railway Station celebrated its centenary in a ceremony attended by President Armando Guebuza. A plaque commemorating the event was unveiled, and the president launched a campaign called "O Património É Nosso" (Portuguese: "Heritage is ours") to promote the preservation of historic public assets. In 2015, a railway museum was opened at the station. It contains exhibits and food venues, and holds music and other events.

== Architecture ==
The initial plans for Central Railway Station were inspired by the old central terminus in Johannesburg, South Africa, but intended the station to have a grander facade. The building is of the Neoclassical Beaux-Arts style. At the center of the station's grand facade is a tall arch, topped by the largest of the building's three domes. The copper-clad semispherical central dome brings the building's height to 51 m. The building's two symmetrical sides connect the main tower to the building's domed side towers through second-story verandas. Ornamental features including marble pillars and wrought iron latticework contribute to its aesthetic appearance.

=== Recognition ===
In 2009, the American magazine Newsweek ranked the station #7 on a list of "Train stations as grand as the journey", and described it as "probably" the most beautiful terminus in Africa. In 2011, the American travel magazine Travel + Leisure included it in a list of the world's 14 most beautiful railway stations. In 2016, the station was included on a list of nine beautiful train stations published by The Financial Express, an Indian business newspaper.

== In popular culture ==
The Maputo Railway Station appears in the 2006 German-American film Blood Diamond.

== Gallery ==
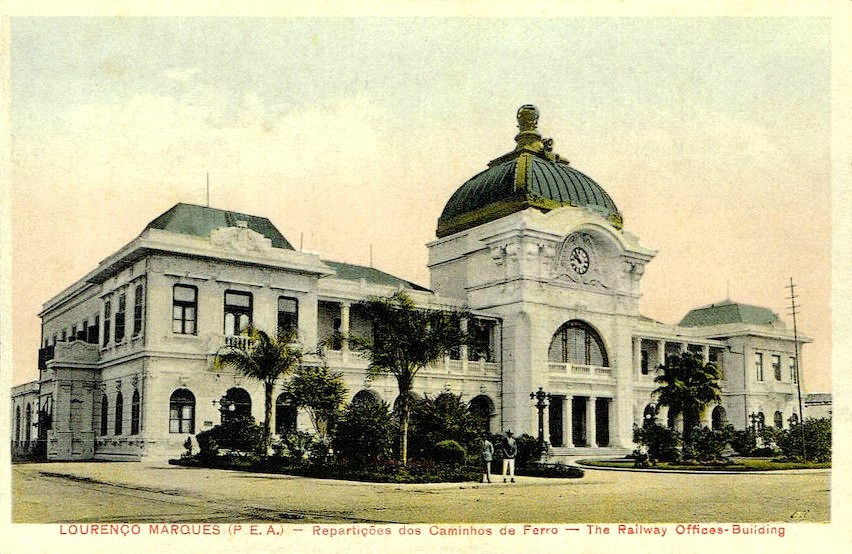
Postcard, c. 1920.

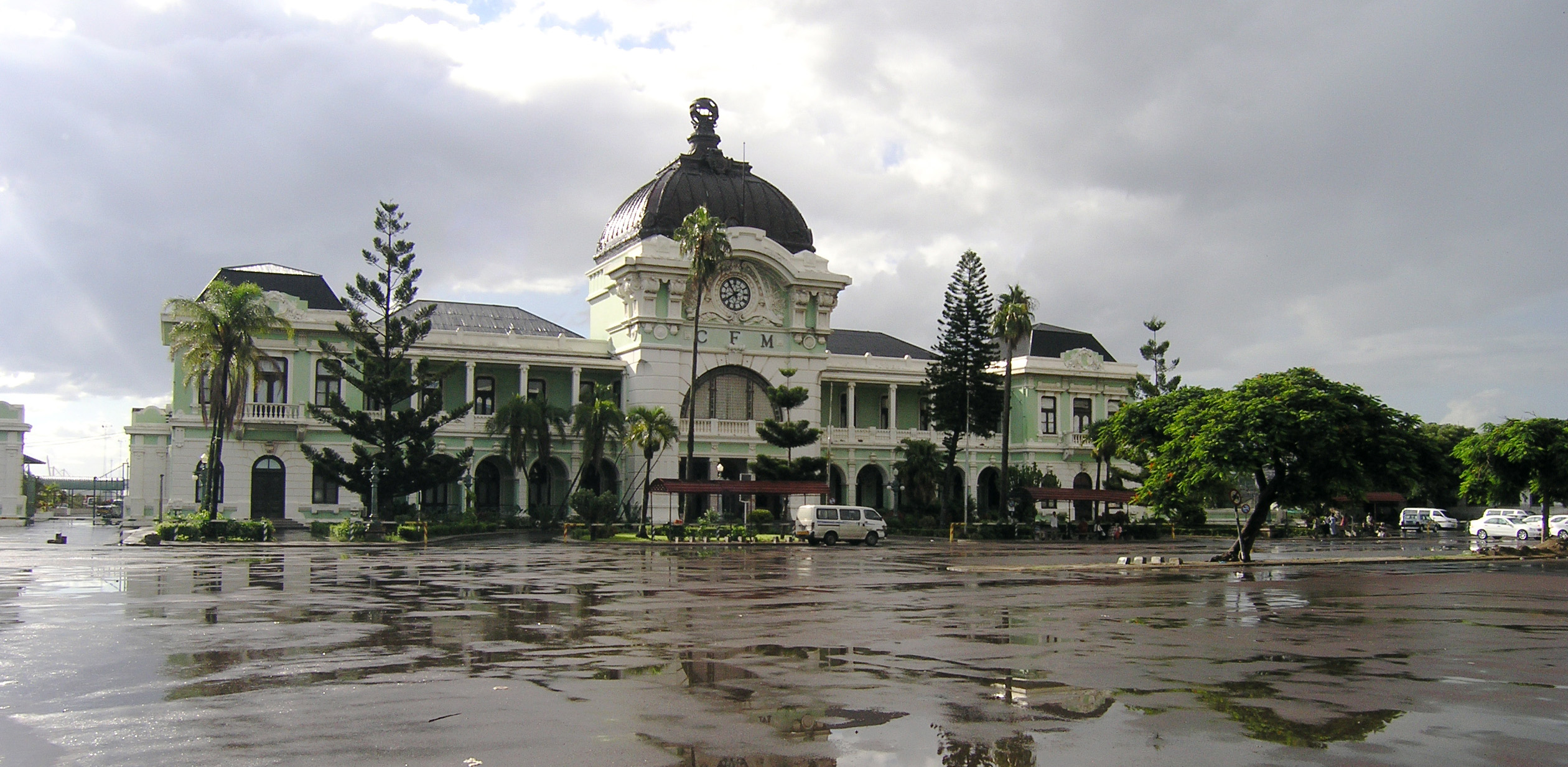
Maputo Central Station, 2005.

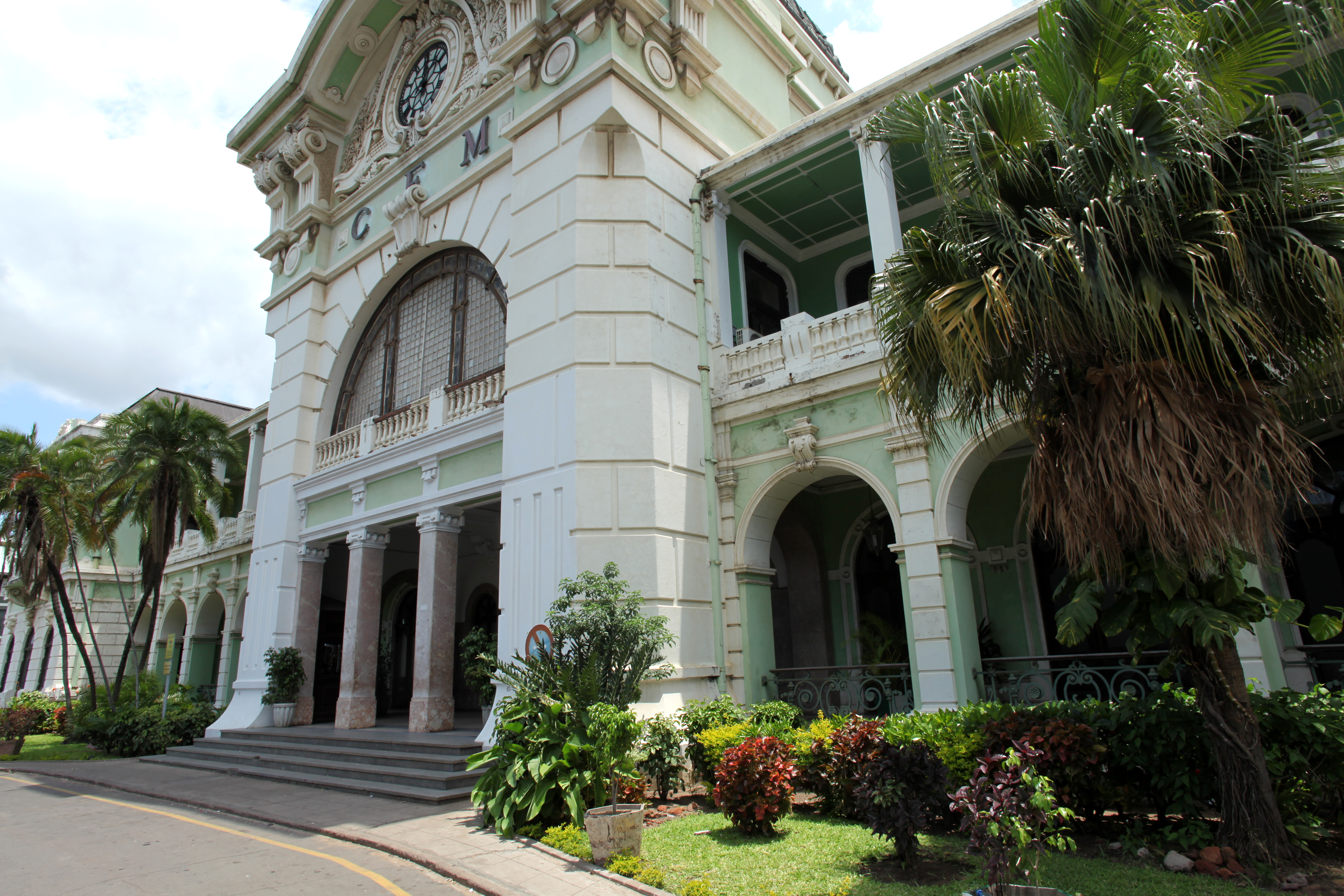
Central tower.

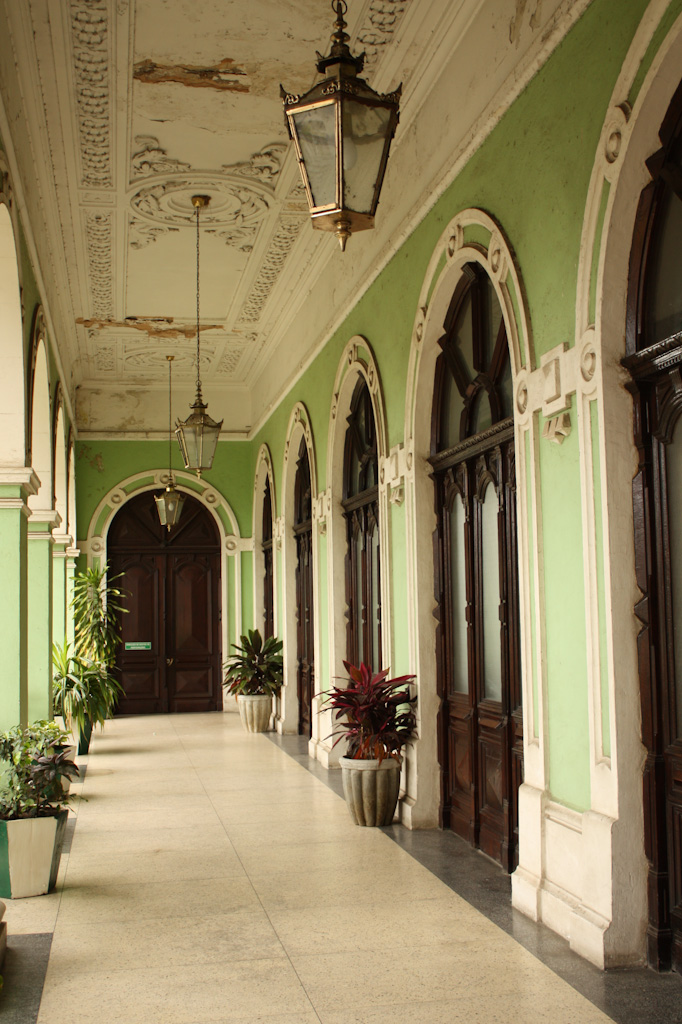
Second-story veranda.
