= Gilberto Mendes (actor) =

Mozambican actor

- Born: May 3, 1966 (age 59); Maputo, Mozambique
- Occupation(s): Actor, politician
- Years active: 1984-present

Carlos Gilberto Mendes (born 3 May 1966) is a Mozambican actor and politician.

== Biography ==
Mendes was born in Maputo in 1966. In December 1977 he broke his first national swimming record and was a member of the Mozambican national team for years.

In 1985, he was chosen to play the leading role in the first feature film entirely Mozambican, entitled O Vento Sopra do Norte, directed by José Cardoso and produced by the National Film Institute. The film tells the story of Mozambique's war of independence involving the guerrilla movement of Frelimo and the Portuguese colonial troops. In 1988, he joined the Mutumbela Gogo cultuaral group. Mendes participated in the play Nove Horas after an actor had an ulcer and passed out, an experience which made him very anxious. Mendes starred in the 1991 film A Child from the South, directed by Sergio Resende. In 1992, he left Mutumbela Gogo and acquired the cinemas Matchedje (1000 seats) and Estúdio 222 (222 seats), as well as founding his own theater company, Gungu. The Matchedje cinema was formerly abandoned and served as a warehouse for stolen goods from the Port Maputo.

In 1995, he received the Lusophone Merit Award from the Portuguese-Brazilian Foundation for the Development of the Portuguese Language. In 1996, Mendes began his 10-year career as a host of the Fantasia musical television program. From 2010 to 2014, he served as president of the Mozambique Swimming Federation. In January 2020, Mendes was appointed Secretary of State for Sports.
