= Tânia Tomé =

Mozambican entrepreneur, author and speaker

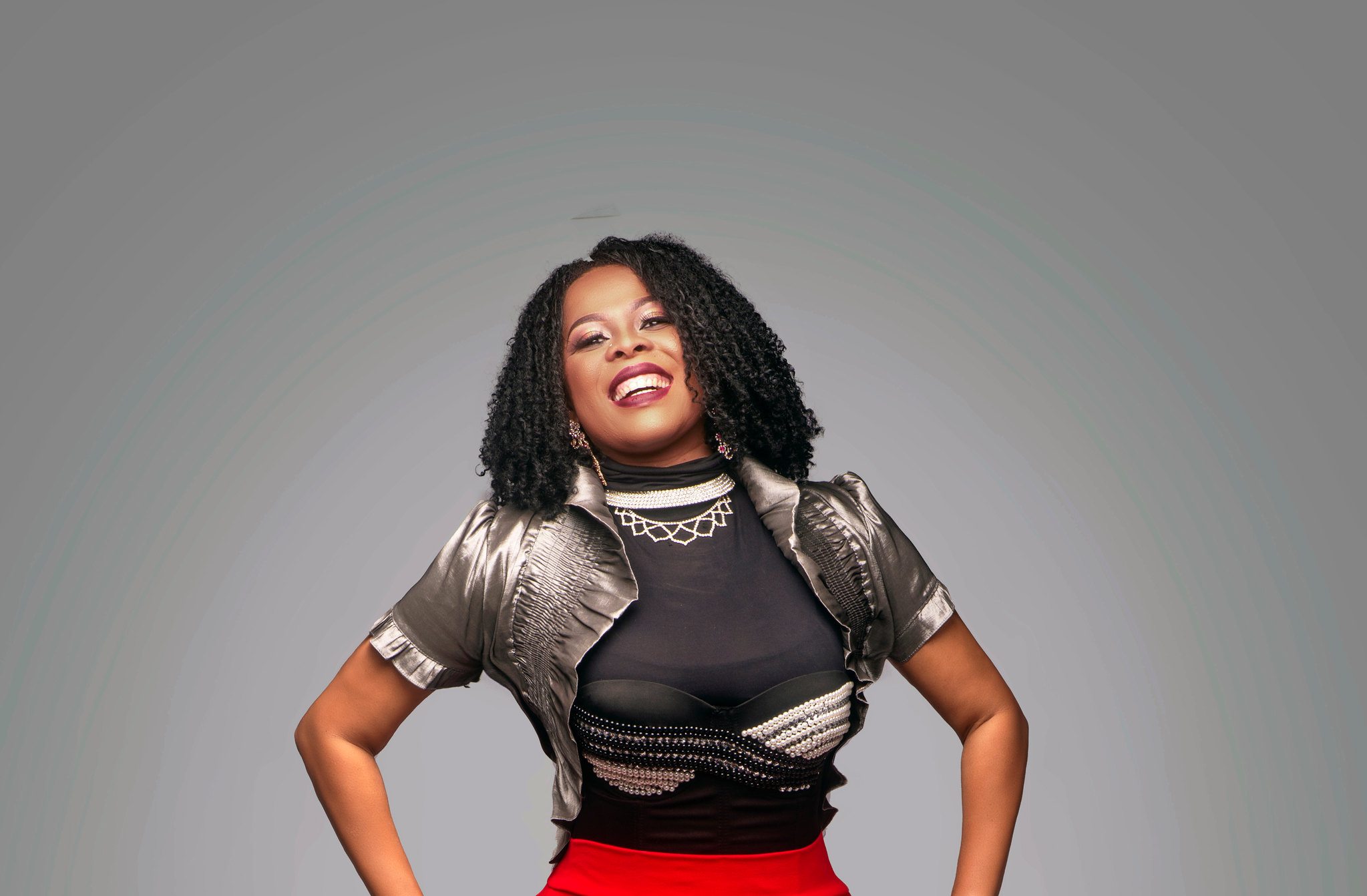
- Born: 1981 (age 44–45); Maputo, Mozambique
- Education: Catholic University of Portugal
- Occupations: Businessperson, writer, speaker, singer
- Years active: 2001–present
- Website: taniatome.com

Tânia Tomé (born 1981) is a Mozambican entrepreneur, economist, author, international speaker. She is the founder and chief executive officer of Ecokaya and the president of Womenice, initiatives focused on leadership, entrepreneurship, and women's empowerment. She also releases music under the name Queentanisha.

She has been recognized for her work in leadership and social impact, including being listed among the Most Influential People of African Descent (MIPAD) Top 100.

== Early life and education ==
Born in Mozambique, Tomé completed a degree in economics from the Catholic University of Portugal, with an academic merit award received from former Portuguese President Mário Soares.

She obtained a postgraduate degree in business administration from the Catholic University of Portugal, and completed an entrepreneurship and business program at the University of Notre Dame.

== Career ==
=== Entrepreneurship and leadership ===
Tomé began her career as a credit analyst and later worked in investment management. In 2011, she founded Ecokaya, a company focused on leadership training, corporate development, and entrepreneurship programs.

In 2020, Tomé published the self-help book Succenergy: Activate Your Energy, Discover All Your Success Inside You, which led to an invitation to deliver a TEDx talk and to conduct training seminars in several countries in Africa and America.

Tomé specializes in entrepreneurship and leadership systems and has appeared in media discussing these topics.

She is the president of Womenice, a women's leadership organization that hosts the Global Leadership Conference.

She was a member of the Forbes Coaches Council, an invitation-only professional organization for senior-level coaching executives.and has served as an American Business Award judge for the [Stevie Awards].

In addition to her work in business and leadership, Tomé has been recognized for her contributions to Mozambican and Portuguese culture and has published several works of poetry and fiction.

According to Aidoo Lamonte and Daniel F. Silva, who translated and introduced her work in Lusophone African Short Stories and Poetry after Independence: Decolonial Destinies (2021), Tomé worked in several professional fields during the 2010s, establishing a business consulting firm in Mozambique. She has also delivered TED talks and worked as a motivational speaker for Mozambican, Lusophone, and international audiences.

=== International speaking ===
Tomé has delivered keynote speeches and training programs at conferences and institutions across Africa, Europe, and the Americas.

She has also participated in international mentorship initiatives as mentor and coach, including programs associated with the Tony Elumelu Foundation.

=== Advocacy and inclusion ===
Tomé's work includes advocacy for gender equality, youth empowerment, and social inclusion. Through her initiatives and public engagements, she has contributed to discussions on diversity and leadership, including participation in events and programs aligned with the United Nations Sustainable Development Goals.

In 2026, through Womenice, she found and launch the Top 100 Inspiring Women of PALOP, a recognition initiative highlighting women from Portuguese-speaking African countries.

The initiative has also been extended to include recognition of women across the Lusophone world.

== Publications ==
Tomé is the author of works in personal development, fiction, and poetry. Her publications include:

- Hold the Sun Behind Me (Portuguese: Agarra-me o Sol por Trás) (2010)
- Conversations with the Shadow (Portuguese: Conversas com a Sombra) (2011)
- Conversations with the Shadow 2.0 (2020)
- Succenergy: Activate Your Energy and Discover All the Success Within You (2020)
- Succenergy for Teenagers: Preparation for Success (2020)
- Melanin: A Dreamer from the Fifth Shout Neighborhood (Portuguese: Melanina: Uma Sonhadora da Favela do Quinto Grito) (2022)

Her work has been referenced in academic contexts, including her first literary collection, Agarra-me o Sol por Trás, received critical attention upon its release. Her poetry explores themes related to the body—particularly the Black female body—and its positioning within imperial, patriarchal, and political structures.

== Awards and recognition ==
Tomé has received recognition for her work in leadership and social impact.

- Portuguese Academic Merit By Former Portuguese President Portugal–Africa Foundation (2003)
- Young Executive Business Leader Award, Global Banking & Finance Awards (2015)
- Most Influential People of African Descent (MIPAD) Top 100 (2018)
- Choiseul 100 Africa – Leaders of Tomorrow

She has served as a Chair Committee member of the judging panel for the Women in Business Awards (Globe Awards).

== Other activities ==
Tomé is also a singer and has released music in genres including jazz, soul, and afropop under the stage name Queentanisha.
