= Cathedral of Our Lady of the Immaculate Conception, Maputo =

Cathedral of Our Lady of the Immaculate Conception
- Catedral de Nossa Senhora da Imaculada Conceição
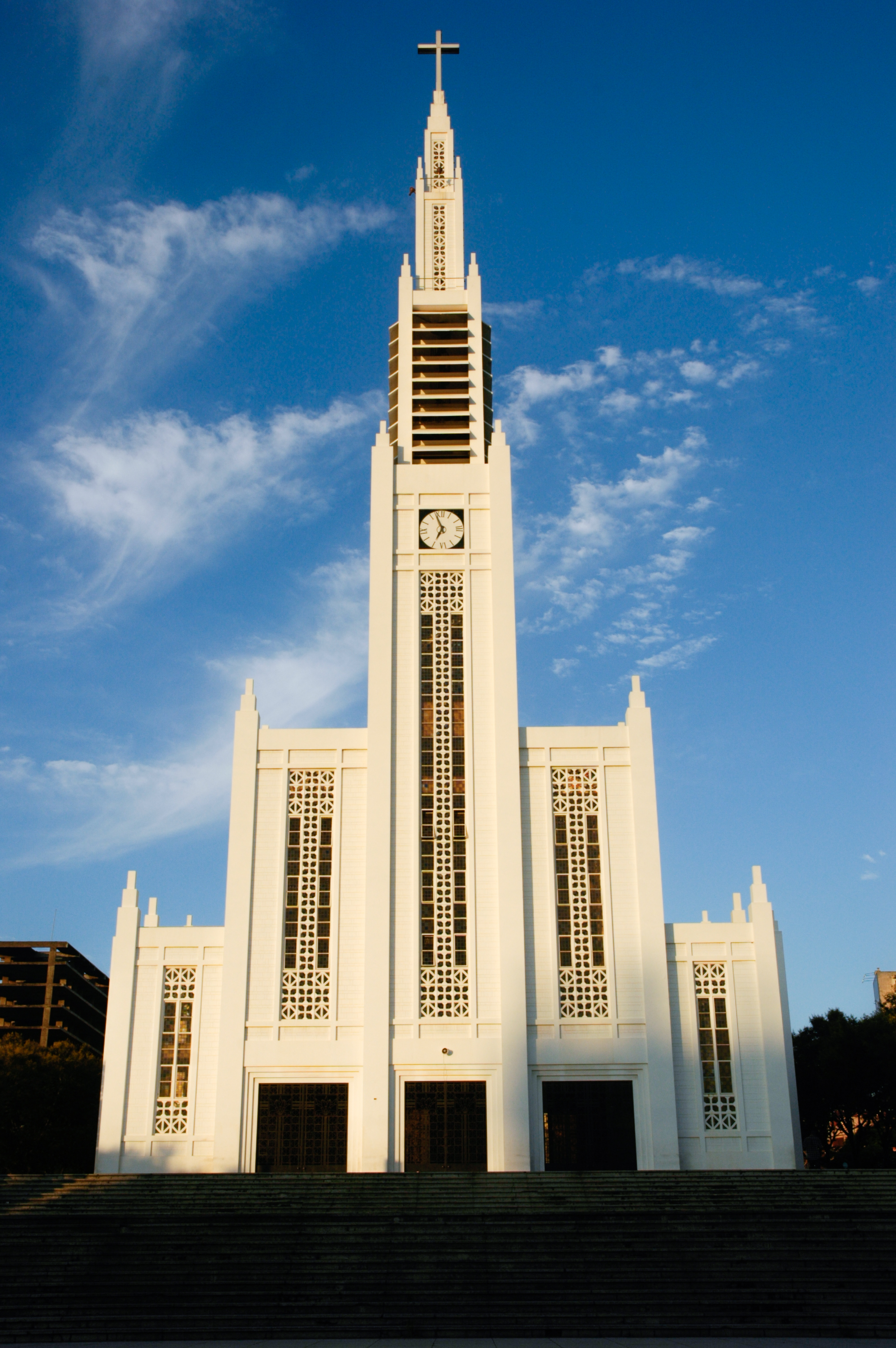
- Cathedral façade
- Cathedral of Our Lady of the Immaculate Conception
- 25°58′8.4″S 32°34′30″E
- Country: Mozambique
- Denomination: Catholic Church

History
- Dedication: 1944

Architecture
- Architect: Marcial Freitas e Costa
- Years built: 1936-1944

Specifications
- Height: 61 m (200 ft)
- Materials: Concrete; cement

Administration
- Archdiocese: Maputo

The Cathedral of Our Lady of the Immaculate Conception (Portuguese language: Catedral de Nossa Senhora da Imaculada Conceição), commonly known as the Maputo Cathedral, is a Catholic cathedral in downtown Maputo, the capital of Mozambique. The cathedral is located on Praça da Independência (Independence Square) next to Hotel Rovuma and Maputo City Hall. It is dedicated to Our Lady of the Immaculate Conception. The foundation stone for the construction of the church was laid on June 28, 1936, and is located inside the narthex and inscribed by the Bishop of Mozambique and Cape Verde, D. Rafael Maria da Asunção. Construction on the cathedral was completed in 1944.

The cathedral was designed by the Portuguese civil engineer Marcial Simões de Freitas e Costa, then a railway director. He designed the church pro bono for the Archdiocese of Lourenço Marques. Freitas was inspired by the simple style and building materials of church construction in Europe of the time; the cathedral was ultimately built of concrete and cement. He was inspired to buildings such as the Notre-Dame du Raincy in Le Raincy (1921-1923) by Auguste Perret and Igreja de Nossa Senhora de Fátima (1934-1938) in Lisbon, built by Pardal Monteiro. The simplicity and the choice of new materials was also a result of financial problems of the period.
