= Francisco Songane =

Dr Francisco Songane

Minister of Health
- In office 2000–2004

Francisco Songane is a medical doctor and former Minister of Health of Mozambique who served from 2000 to 2004. He is a recognized "champion of maternal and child health" and has been "recognized both nationally and internationally for innovation and leadership" in the field of maternal and child health.

== Early career ==
Dr. Songane is medical doctor specialized in obstetrics/gynaecology and public health. His medical degree is from the University of Eduardo Mondlane in Maputo, Mozambique. He trained at St. James University Hospital in Leeds, UK. He holds a master's degree in Public Health (MPH) from Boston University and Masters of Science in Financial Economics (MS) from the University of London, UK.

== World Health Organization ==
In December 2005, Dr. Songane was named the new Director of the Partnership for Maternal, Newborn and Child Health. This 'partnership' has more than 300 governmental, inter-governmental and non-governmental members working to ensure the well-being of all women, infants and children. In announcing his naming to the post of Director, the Medical News Today, stated that "[a]s Minister of Health of Mozambique, Dr. Songane is credited for using a partnership approach for averting the outbreak of disease during the floods of 2000 and 2001, as well as for the conclusion and operational launch of the country's health-sector strategy. He worked to introduce innovative interventions into the Mozambican health system, including Hepatitis B vaccine, trials on a potential Malaria and use of a more effective Cholera vaccine, as well as antiretroviral therapy into the public system—an example that has been shared globally."

Dr. Songane has been a vocal defender of the human rights of women and children before the UN Human Rights Council and at other leading international meetings.

== Selected publications ==
- J. Bryce, N. Terreri, C. Victora, E. Mason, B. Daelmans, Z. Bhutta, F. Bustreo, F. Songane, P. Salama, T. Wardlaw, "Countdown to 2015: tracking intervention coverage for child survival," The Lancet, Volume 368, Issue 9541, pp. 1067–1076 (2006).
- Marcelino E.S. Lucas, Jacqueline L. Deen, Lorenz von Seidlein, Xuan-Yi Wang, Julia Ampuero, Mahesh Puri, M.S., Mohammad Ali, M. Ansaruzzaman, Juvenaldo Amos, Arminda Macuamule, Philippe Cavailler, Philippe J. Guerin, Claude Mahoudeau, Pierre Kahozi-Sangwa, Claire-Lise Chaignat, Avertino Barreto, Francisco F. Songane, and John D. Clemens, "Effectiveness of Mass Oral Cholera Vaccination in Beira, Mozambique," The New England journal of Medicine, Vol. 352, No. 8, pp. 757–767 (24 February 2005).
- FF Songane, S Bergström, "Quality of registration of maternal deaths in Mozambique: a community-based study in rural and urban areas," Social Science & Medicine, Volume 54, Issue 1, pp. 23–31(January 2002).
- Bergström S, Povey G, Songane F, Ching C., Seasonal incidence of eclampsia and its relationship to meteorological data in Mozambique," Journal of Perinatal Medicine, Vol. 20, Issue 2, pp. 153–8(1992).
