= Lucrécia Paco =

Mozambican actress (born 1969)

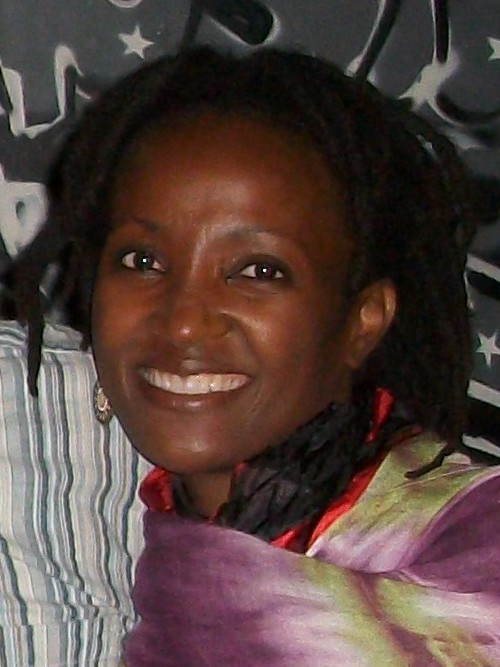
- Born: October 19, 1969 (age 56); Maputo, Mozambique
- Occupation: Actress
- Years active: 1984-present

Lucrécia Paco (born 19 October 1969) is a Mozambican actress. She is considered to be one of the most acclaimed actresses in Mozambique.

== Biography ==
Paco grew up in Maputo. As a child, she enjoyed singing and dancing to the traditional music, which was severely repressed at the time before Mozambique's independence in 1975. Paco was beaten at school for using traditional languages. After independence, the socialist government encouraged artistic groups, and she participated by singing, dancing, and reciting poems.

During the Mozambican Civil War, Paco turned her attention towards theater as a form of political action. She was featured in the 1984 documentary Maputo Mulher. In 1986, Paco was one of the founders of the Mutumbela Gogo troupe, the first professional theater troupe in Mozambique which is still ongoing today. She was influenced by the many Soviet films that she watched, and created short plays about what it was like to be Mozambican. In order to support the theater group, Paco and other members founded a bakery.

Paco took a five-year break from the stage due to burnout. Paco was invited by the Instituto Itaú Cultural to Brazil in 2009. She participated in the Antidote project in the International Seminar on Cultural Actions in Conflict Zones, using the play Mulher Asfalto. In 2010, Paco was cast in the film Quero Ser uma Estrela. Shortly thereafter, she played the protagonist in Nineteens, Mozambique's first telenovela.

== Filmography ==
=== Television ===
Year	Title	Role
2010	Nineteens	Glória Monjane
2002	A Jóia de África	Abibi

=== Films ===
Year	Title	Role
2010	Quero Ser uma Estrela	Woman
2010	Flores Silvestres	
1998	Nelio's Story	Maria
1986	O Vento Sopra do Norte	
1984	Maputo Mulher	
