= National Library of Mozambique =

Library in Maputo, Mozambique

Coordinates: 25.9736°S 32.5731°E

National Library of Mozambique Biblioteca Nacional de Moçambique
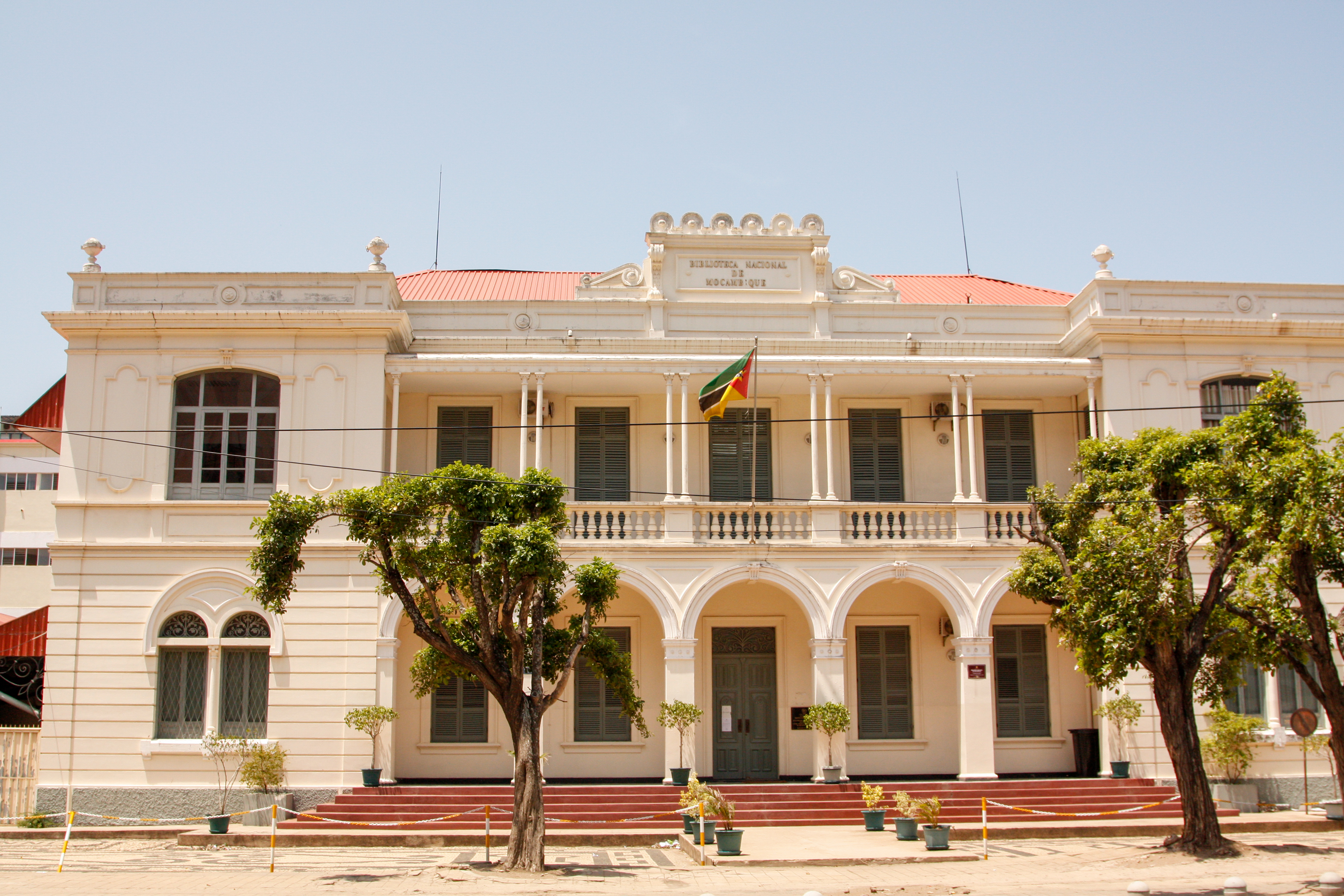
- Location: Maputo, Mozambique
- Type: National library
- Established: 1961

Other information
- Director: Jorge Fernando Jairoce
- Website: http://www.bnm.gov.mz/index.php/en/

The National Library of Mozambique (Biblioteca Nacional de Moçambique) is located in Maputo, Mozambique. It is located in a structure which formerly housed the Office of Finance of the Colony of Mozambique. It was designed by the architect Mario Veiga in 1904, and is located on 25 de Setembro Avenue.

== Organizational structure ==
The organizational structure of the National Library of Mozambique was created by Diploma Ministerial of the Mozambican Ministry of Culture no. 103/92 of July 22. It established four units for the National Library, namely:

- The Directorate, which is responsible for the overall management of the library;
- Department of Technology and Training, which performs the technical processing of all materials received by the National Library, consults on the functioning of the reading rooms and depositary, ensures general reference service and bibliographic information, and implements institutional training.
- Department of Preservation and Conservation, which is responsible for the conservation, restoration, and binding of materials of the National Library.
- Division of Administration and Finance, which manages the basic administration, finance, and human resources, and public relations for the National Library. It also coordinates the National Public Libraries System of Mozambique (Sistema Nacional de Bibliotecas Públicas).

== See also ==
- Arquivo Histórico de Moçambique (national archives)
- List of national libraries

== Bibliography ==
- Marcel Lajeunesse, ed. (2008). "Mozambique". Les Bibliothèques nationales de la francophonie (PDF) (in French) (3rd ed.). Bibliothèque et Archives nationales du Québec. OCLC 401164333.
