= Alberto Massavanhane =

Mozambican politician and diplomat (1930–1993)

Personal details
- Born: Alberto Massavanhane; 9 February 1930 Vila João Belo, Portuguese Mozambique
- Died: 29 September 1993 (aged 63) Stockholm, Sweden
- Party: Mozambique Liberation Front

Alberto Massavanhane ( 9 February 1930 – 29 September 1993) was a Mozambican diplomat, teacher, and the first Mayor of Maputo. After the signing of Lusaka Accord, in 1974, Massavanhane was nominated by Frelimo as Mayor of Lourenço Marques during the transition government, becoming the first Mozambican to be President of the Executive Council of Maputo after Independence of Mozambique in 1975. In 1983 Alberto Massavanhane was again called to be the head of Maputo local government, before being designated as Ambassador of Mozambique in the Kingdom of Sweden, also covering Denmark, Finland, Iceland and Norway, from 1988 until his death in 1993.

== Early years ==
Alberto was born in Xai-Xai on February 9, 1930, district capital of Gaza, being the youngest of the three sons of Massavanhane Nhancume and his wife Chonipane, a family of small farmers and shepherds. By the age of 13 he went to live to Lourenço Marques, taking up his education in the Christian Mission of Magude. By the age of 20 in the same Magude Mission, he contracted religious marriage with Rosa Paulo Chadraca.

== Political activities and career ==
Subversive to the Portuguese colonialist regime, Alberto was the teacher of future Mozambican Prime-Minister and President Joaquim Chissano. Both locally, as a Mozambican teacher, and internationally as an African head of local government he always continued to have a role in the fight against colonialism.

After Mozambique's Independence Massavanhane became the first black, Mozambican, Mayor of Maputo serving two terms, the first from 1974 (before the Declaration of Independence) until 1980, and the second term from 1983 to 1988.

During his second term he developed several actions concerting Maputo with international institutions and strategies. In 1985 he was very involved in fighting the malaria epidemics in Maputo, alongside other African nations and governments. Also in 1985, along with Lisbon's Mayor Nuno Kruz Abecassis, Massavanhane had a pivotal role in the constitution of UCCLA (União das Cidades Capitais Luso-Afro-Américo-Asiáticas) the precursor of CPLP.

In 1988 Alberto Massavanhane was designated plenipotentiary Ambassador of the Republic of Mozambique to the Kingdom of Sweden, with embassy in Stockholm.
