= Lourenço Marques (explorer) =

Portuguese explorer

Lourenço Marques [lo(w)ˈɾẽsu ˈmaɾkɨʃ] was a 16th-century Portuguese trader and coloniser.

== Biography ==
Lourenço Marques explored the area that is now Maputo Bay in 1544 and settled permanently in present-day Mozambique, where he spent most of his life with his indigenous wife and their children.

By order of King John III, Maputo Bay was named Baía de Lourenço Marques in his honour, but this name was never in common use among the foreign community.

== Other uses ==
Maputo, the capital city of Portuguese Mozambique since 1898, was founded as Lourenço Marques before this Overseas Province of Portugal, the so-called Portuguese East Africa where was the seat of the governor-general, became independent from the colonial power in 1975: the city got its present name on 3 February 1976, giving its name to one of the six districts into which the province was divided.

== References and sources ==
Sources

- Harm J. De Blij, The Functional Structure and Central Business District of Lourenço Marques, Mocambique, Economic Geography, Vol. 38, No. 1, pp. 56–77.
- Catholic Encyclopaedia
- WorldStatesmen- Mozambique
