= Tempo (Mozambique magazine) =

Tempo was a weekly illustrated magazine founded in 1970 in Maputo, Portuguese East Africa, which is now Mozambique. The magazine acted as a voice of opposition to Portuguese colonial practices and rule in the colony. It was Mozambique's first full color magazine.

Tempo was co-founded by photojournalist Ricardo Rangel and four other Mozambican journalists. Rangel worked as the magazine's main photographer.

In 1972, the magazine began to request government support to increase its financial sources. Following the 25 April 1974 coup in Portugal the magazine was again controlled by the Frelimo journalists. Then it became the first media outlet in the country to visit the liberated areas by Frelimo and to make an interview with Samora Machel.
