= Tunduru Gardens =

Public park and garden in Maputo, Mozambique

Tunduru Gardens Jardim Tunduru
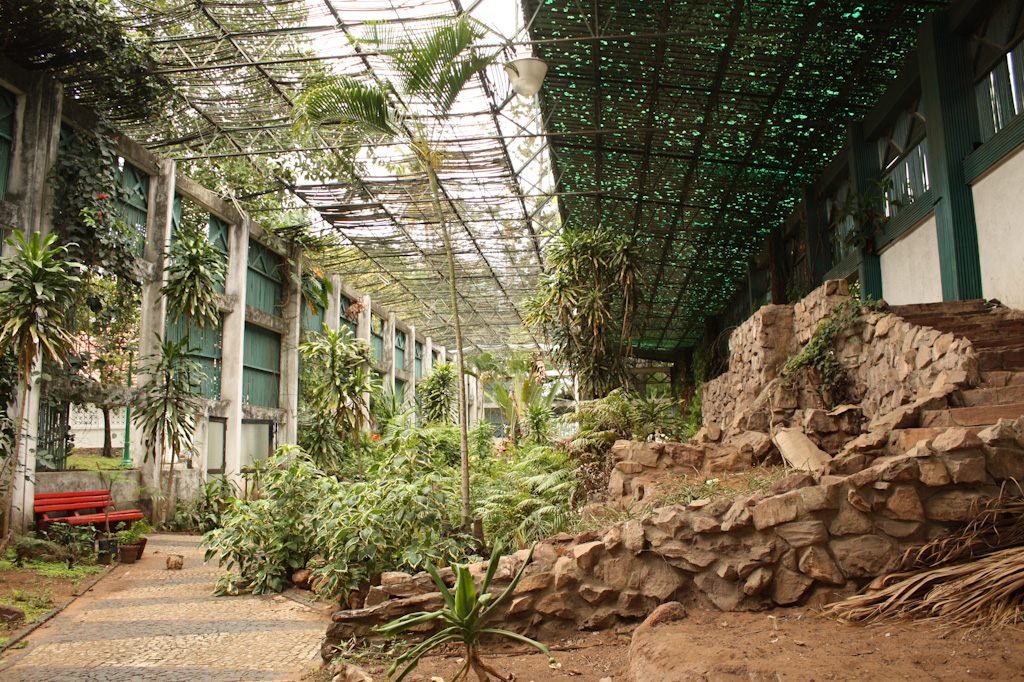
- Interactive map of Tunduru Gardens; Jardim Tunduru
- Type: Urban park
- Location: Maputo, Mozambique
- Coordinates: 25.9716°S 32.5739°E
- Created: 1885

The Tunduru Gardens is public park and garden in downtown Maputo, Mozambique. It was designed in 1885 by British gardener Thomas Honney under commission by the ruling Portuguese authorities. It is home to tennis courts owned by the Mozambique Tennis Federation. Prior to Mozambique's independence (1975), the original name of these gardens was Jardim Vasco da Gama.
