= Maputo City Hall =

- Edifício do Conselho Municipal de Maputo
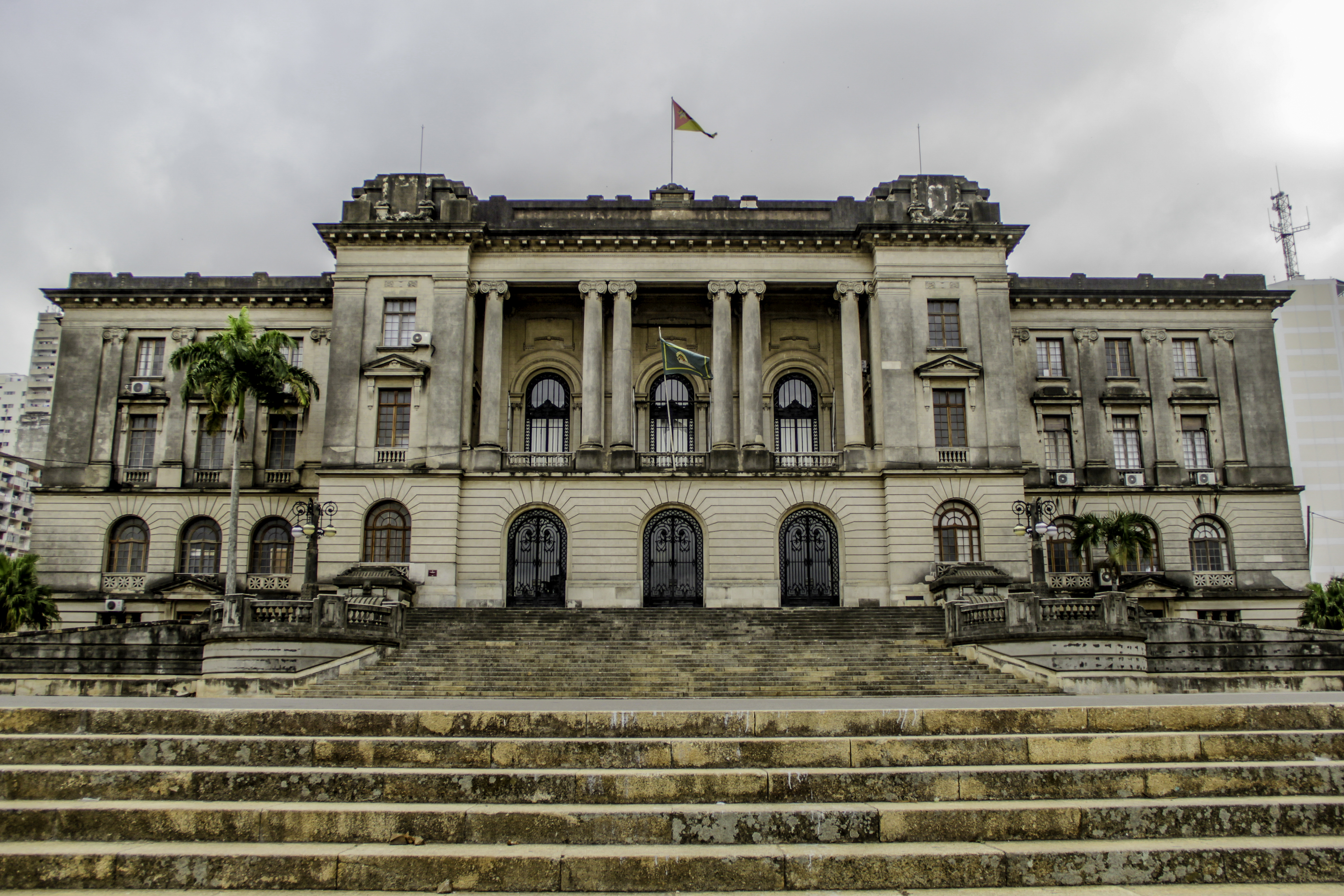
- Maputo City Hall

General information
- Type: Government building
- Location: Maputo, Mozambique, 24 de Julho Avenue
- Coordinates: 25°58′5″S 32°34′25″E
- Inaugurated: 1947

Design and construction
- Architect: Carlos César dos Santos

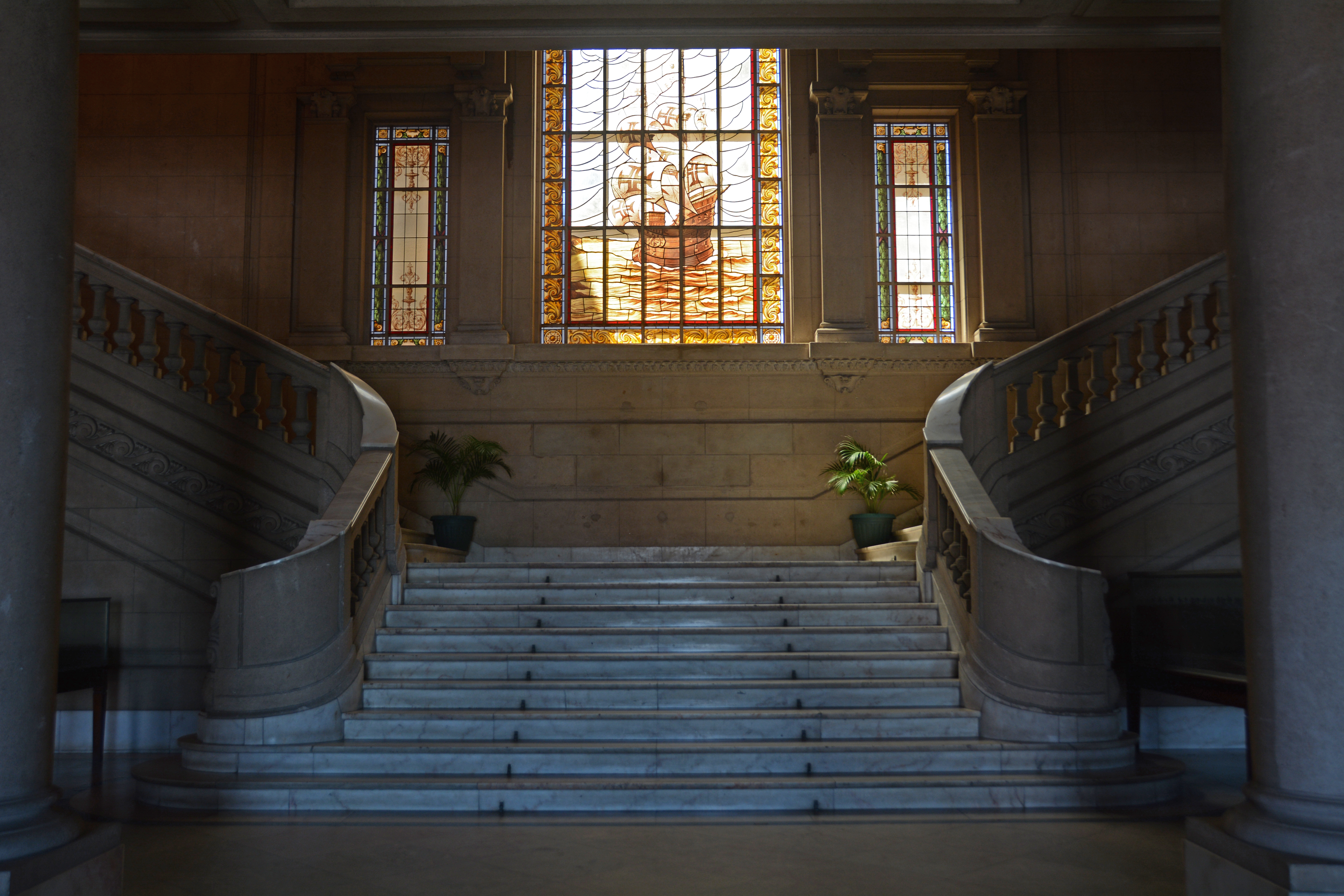
Entrance hall of the city hall

Maputo City Hall or Municipal Council Building of Maputo (Portuguese: Edifício do Conselho Municipal de Maputo) is the seat of the local government of the capital of Mozambique. The neoclassical building is located at the head of Praça da Independência (Independence Square), and was erected in 1947.

== History ==
José Maria da Silva Cardoso, the mayor of Lourenço Marques, as Maputo was known in the colonial period, opened an architecture competition for a new city hall in the 1930s. The need for a new city hall was spurred by the ongoing growth of the colonial city. The Portuguese-Brazilian architect Carlos César dos Santos won the competition in 1938. In 1941, the new mayor, Francisco dos Santos Pinto Teixeira, started construction works on the new building, which was built facing on to Praça Mouzinho de Albuquerque (renamed Praça da Independência in 1975). It was finished in 1947.

Santos designed the new Câmara Municipal Building (the new City Hall) with a trapezoidal layout situated on a hill, so it became automatically the focal point of the Avenida D. Luis (today Samora Machel Avenue), which connects the Independence Square with the city's downtown area, (Baixa). The city hall has a façade of 65 metres (213 ft) and is completely designed in the Neoclassical fashion and follows the architectonic beaux-art rules. Owing to financial constraints, the city government chose artificial stone instead of dimension stone.

Lourenço Marques' government (Câmara Municipal de Lourenço Marques) moved into the new structure in 1947. It remained seat of the Maputo city government after Mozambique's independence in 1975. The city government which occupies the building is now called the Conselho Municipal de Maputo in Portuguese.

The Maputo City Hall was added to the list of cultural monuments of Maputo in 2011. Furthermore, it is listed in the Portuguese heritage database Sistema de Informação para o Património Arquitectónico (SIPA) under the number 31708.

== Literature ==
- André Renga Faria Ferreira: Obras públicas em Moçambique: inventário da produção arquitectónica executada entre 1933 e 1961, Master thesis at Coimbra University, Coimbra, 2006 (

online).
