= Maputo =

Capital and chief port of Mozambique

Maputo Lourenço Marques (Note: Official name until 1976)
- Capital city & Province
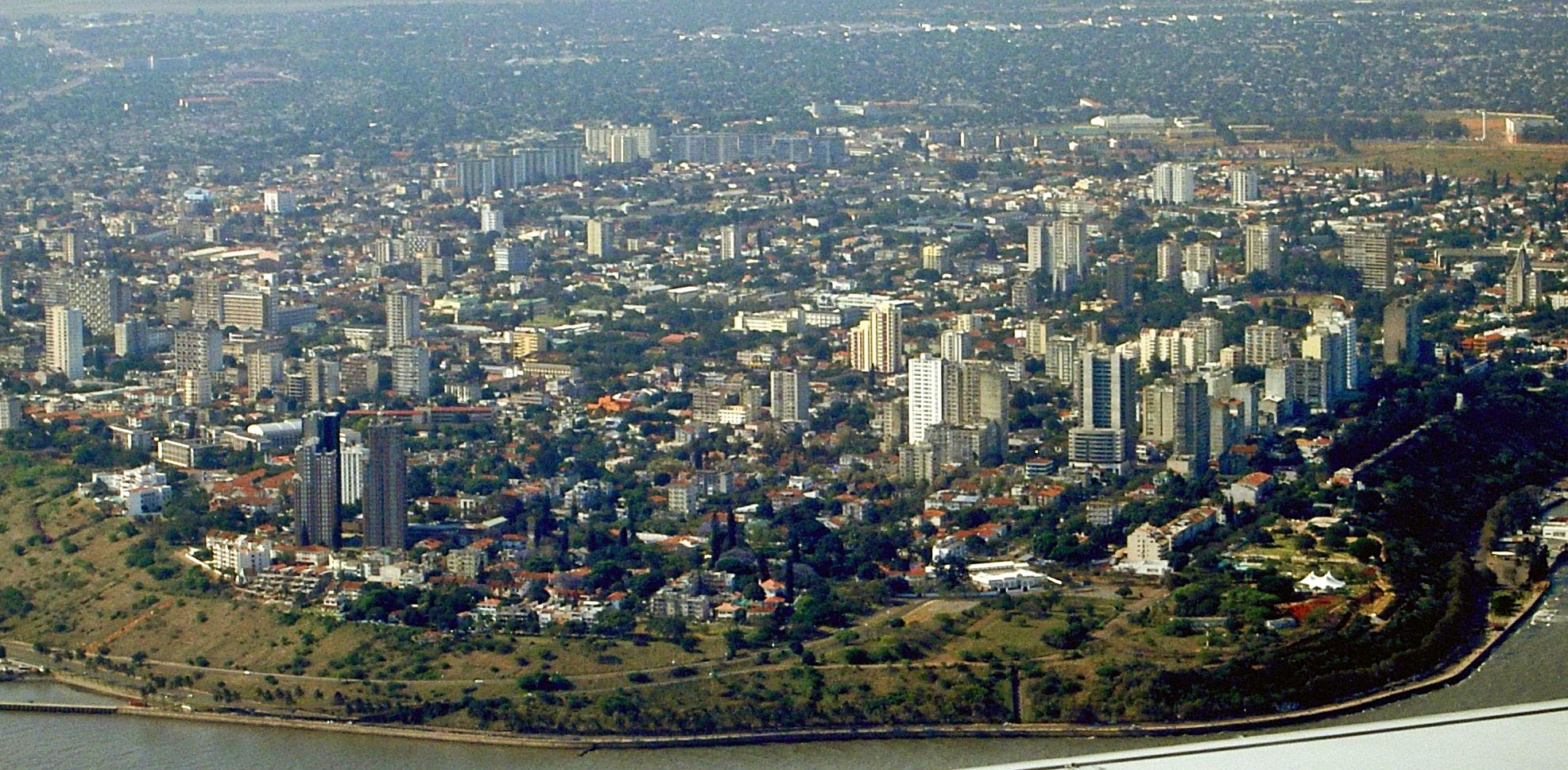
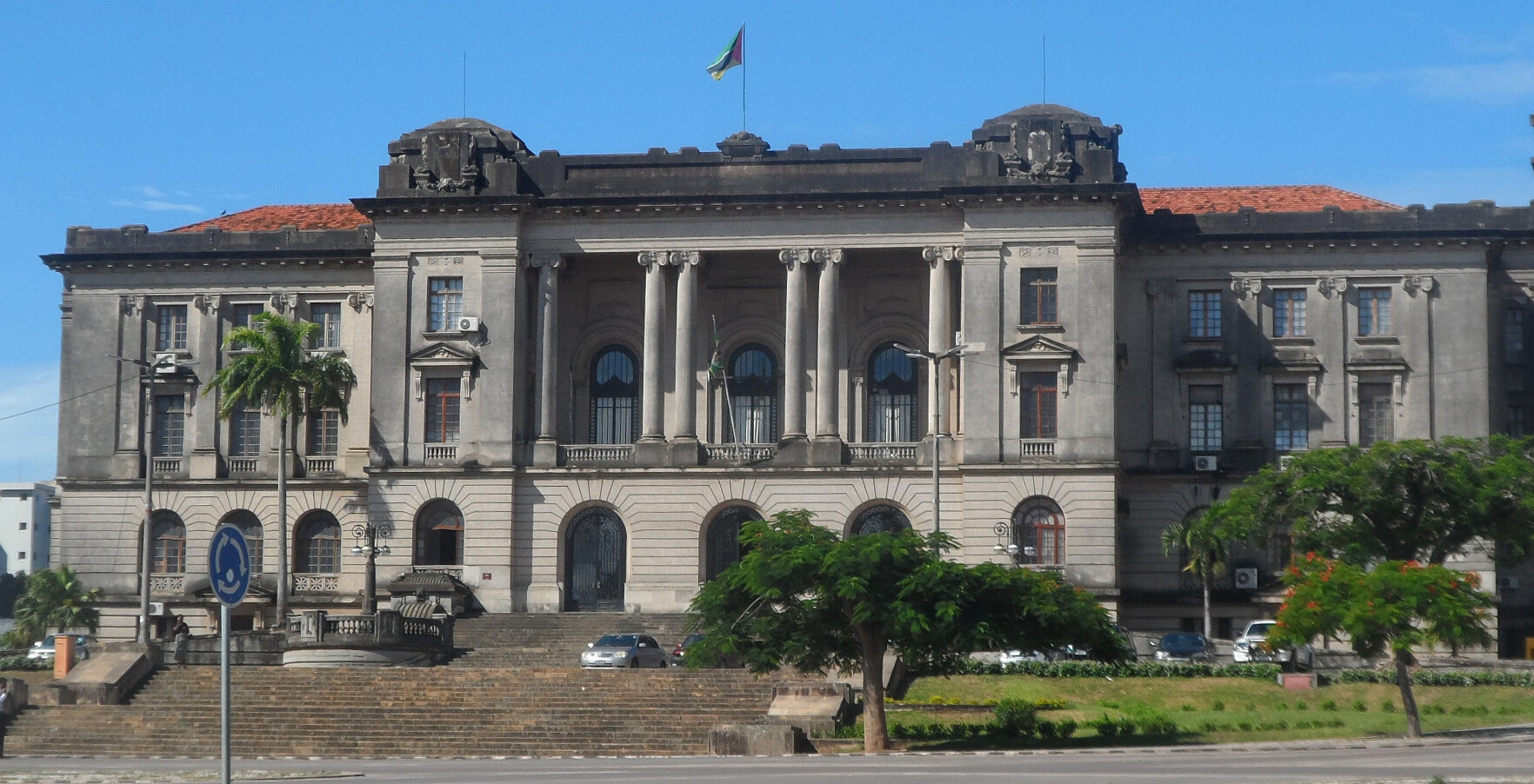
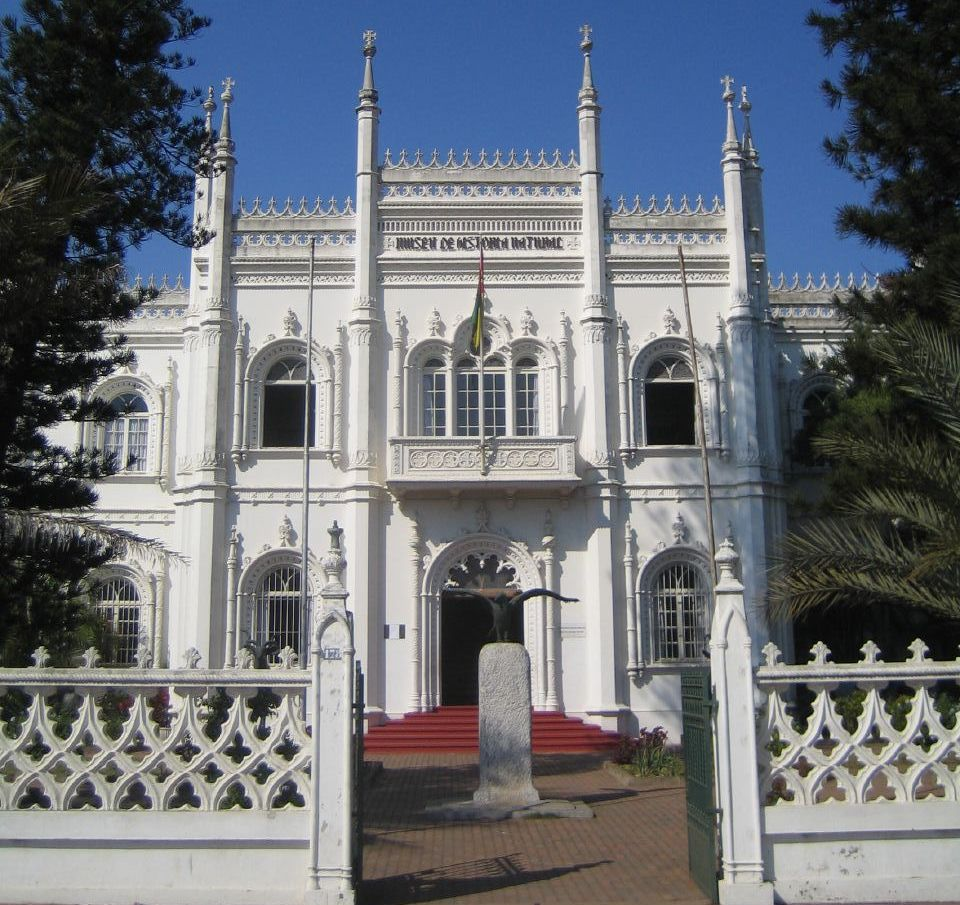
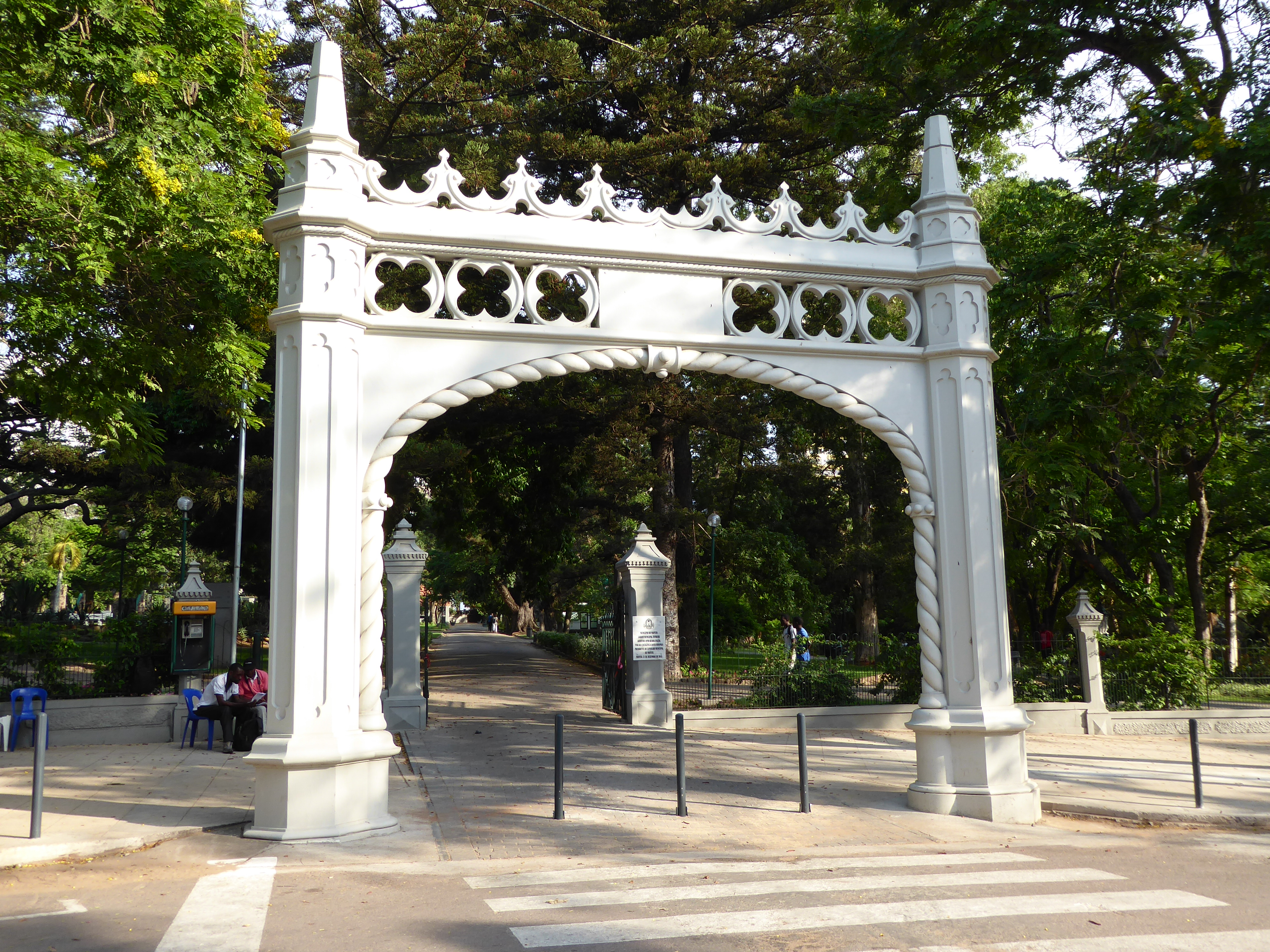
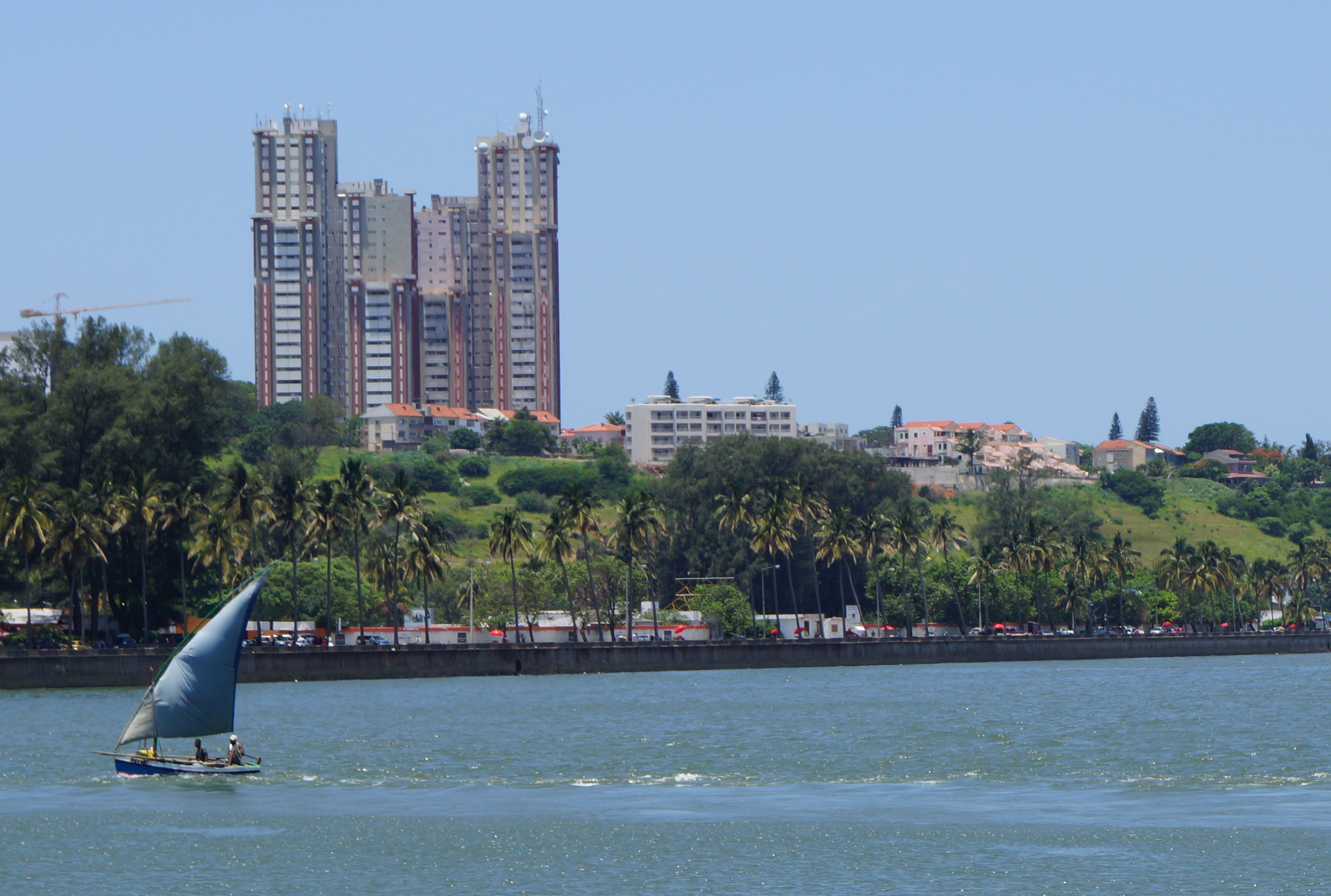
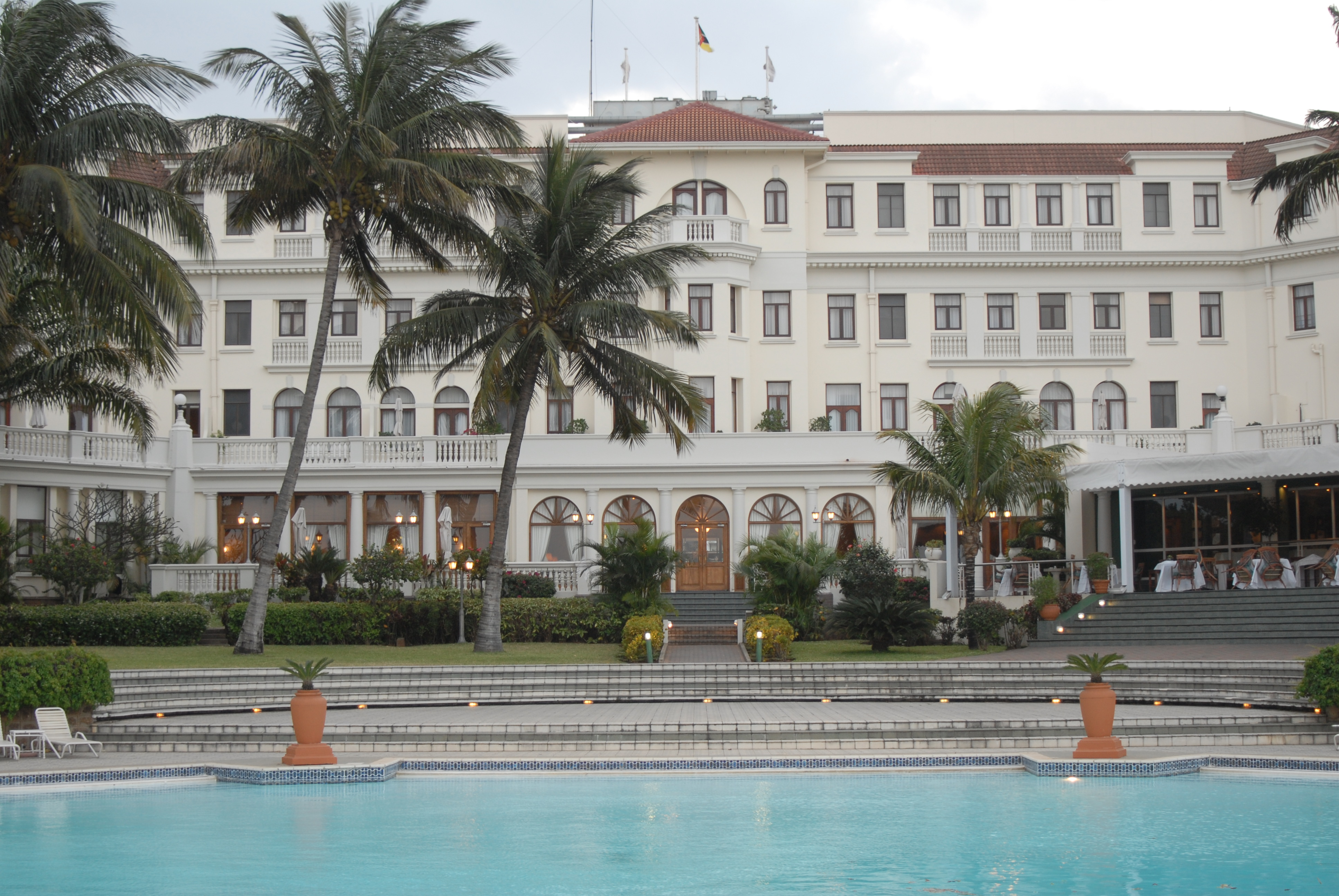
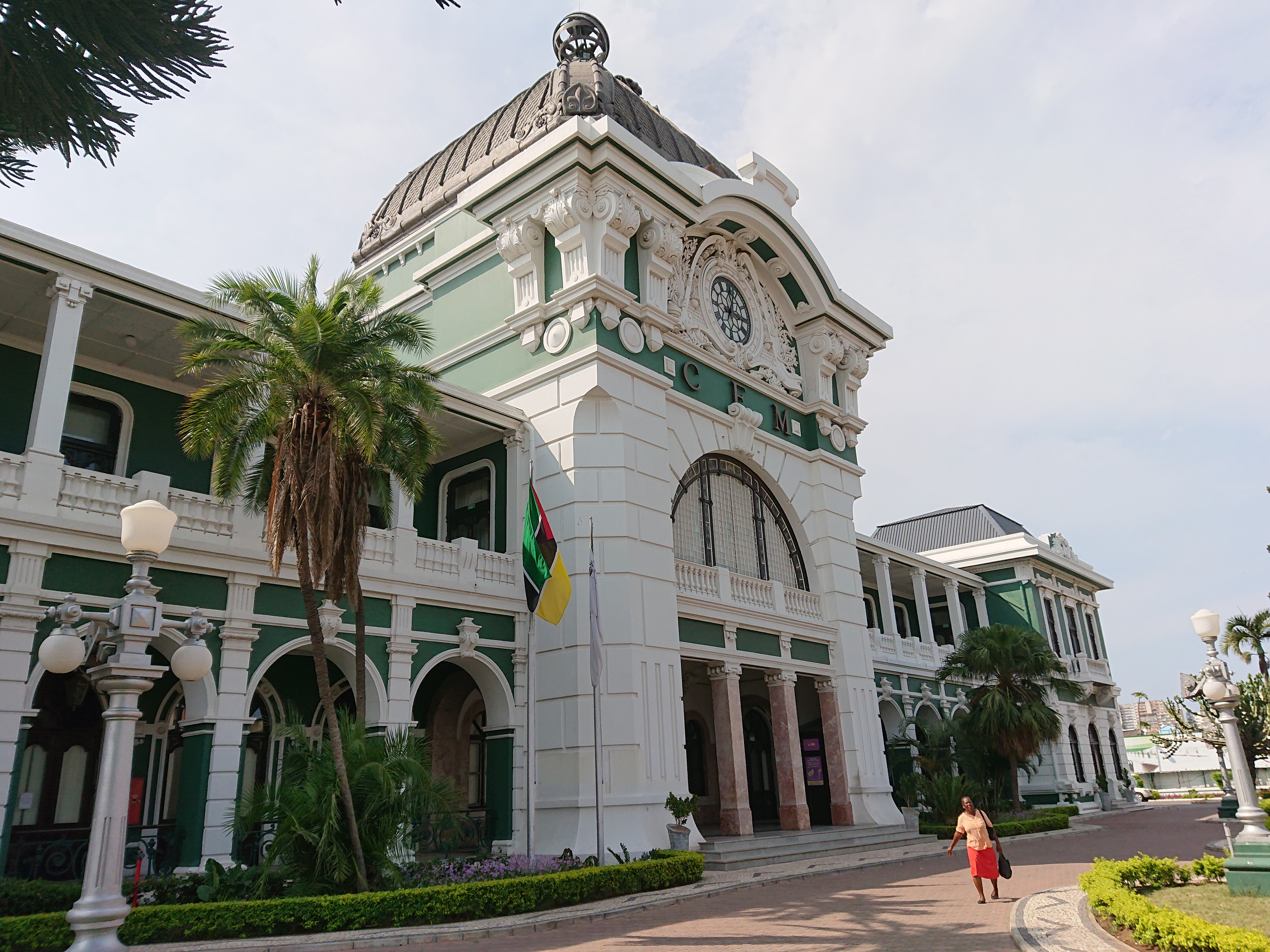
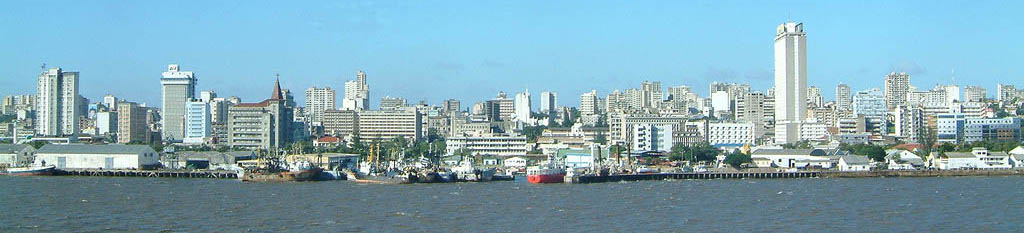
- Aerial view of central Maputo Maputo City Hall Natural History Museum Tunduru Gardens Torres Vermelhas Hotel Polana Central Station View from across Maputo Bay

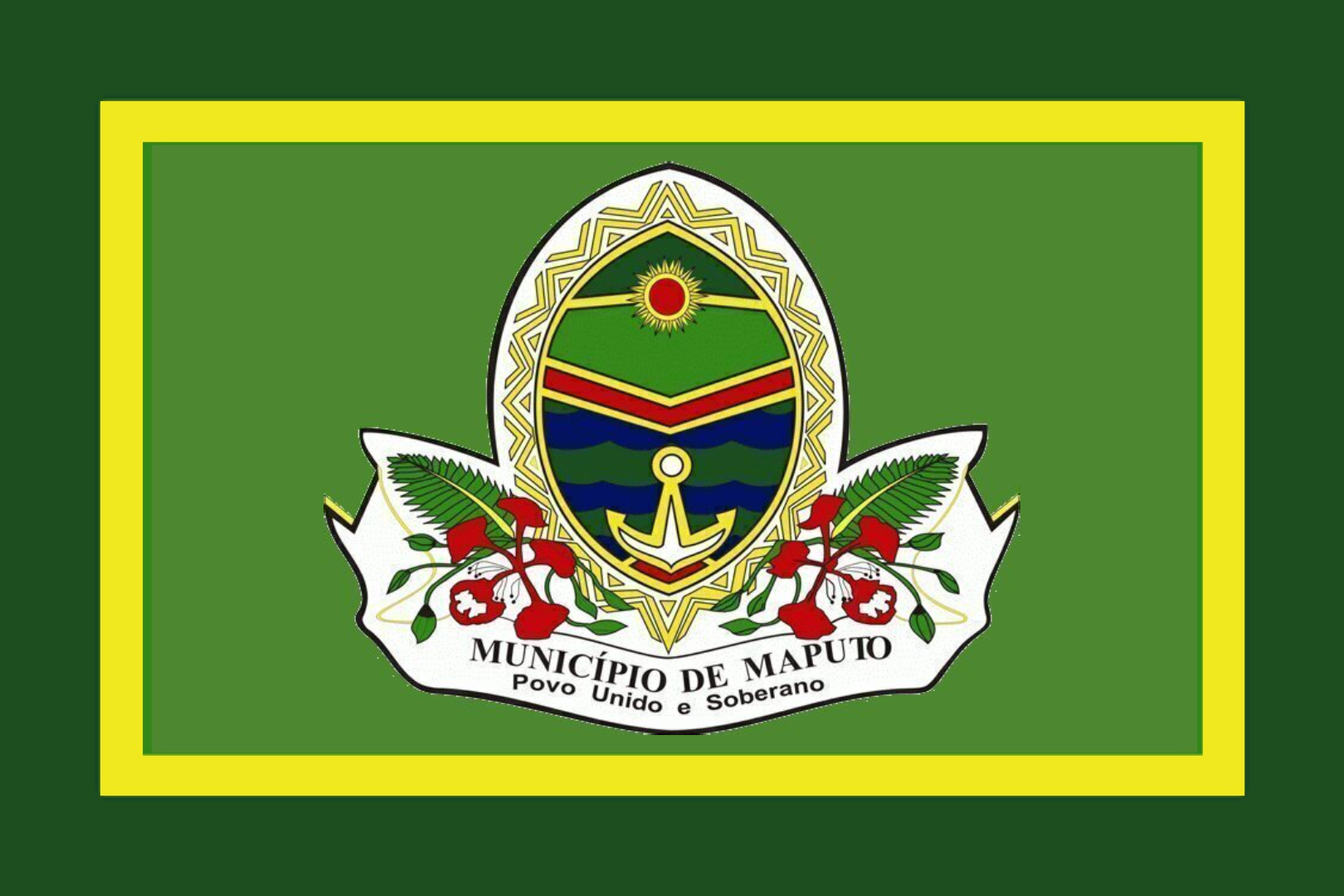
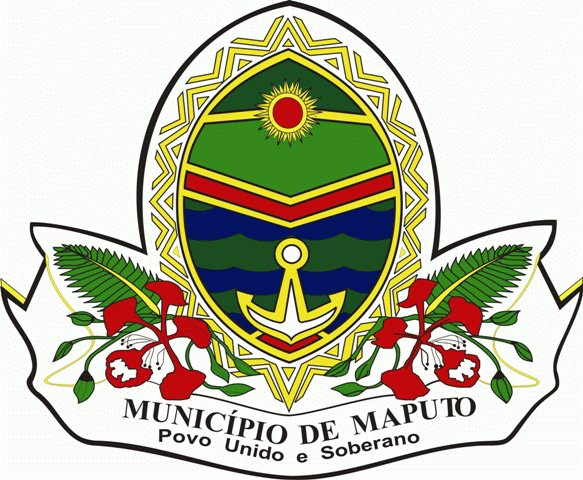
- Flag Coat of arms

- Location in Mozambique

- Location within Mozambique Location within Africa
- Coordinates: 25°58′8″S 32°34′24″E
- Country: Mozambique
- Founded: 1781
- Established (town): 9 December 1876
- Elevated (city): 10 November 1887
- Elevated (capital): 1898
- Named for: Maputo River

Government
  - Municipal Council President: Razaque Manhique
  - Governor: Iolanda Cintura

Area
  - Capital city & Province: 347.69 km^{2} (134.24 sq mi)
- Elevation: 47 m (154 ft)

Population (2017 census)
  - Capital city & Province: 1,088,449
  - Estimate (2020): 1,124,988
  - Rank: 1st
  - Density: 3,130.5/km^{2} (8,108.0/sq mi)
  - Metro: 1,766,823
- Time zone: UTC+2 (CAT)
- Postal code: 0101-XX, 0102-XX, 0103-XX, 0104-XX, 0105-XX, 0106-XX, 0107-XX
- Area Code & Prefix: (+258) 21-XX-XX-XX
- ISO 3166 code: MZ
- HDI (2021): 0.610 medium · 1st
- Website: www.cmmaputo.gov.mz

Maputo (Portuguese pronunciation: [mɐˈputu]) is the capital and largest city of Mozambique. Located near the southern end of the country, it is within 120 kilometres (75 miles) of the borders with Eswatini and South Africa. The city has a population of 1,088,449 (as of 2017) distributed over a land area of 347.69 km^{2} (134.24 sq mi). The Maputo metropolitan area includes the neighbouring city of Matola, and has a total population of 2,717,437. Maputo is a port city, with an economy centered on commerce. It is noted for its vibrant cultural scene and distinctive, eclectic architecture. Maputo was named Lourenço Marques (Portuguese: [lo(w)ˈɾẽsu ˈmaɾkɨʃ]) until 1976.

Maputo is situated on a large natural bay on the Indian Ocean, near where the rivers Tembe, Mbuluzi, Matola and Infulene converge. The city consists of seven administrative divisions, which are each subdivided into quarters or bairros. The city is surrounded by Maputo Province, but is administered as a self-contained, separate province since 1998. Maputo City is the geographically smallest and most densely populated province in Mozambique. Maputo is a cosmopolitan city, with Xitsonga, Portuguese, and, to a lesser extent, Arabic, Indian, and Chinese languages and cultures present. Almost 50% of Maputo speaks Portuguese as a native language as of 2017.

The area on which Maputo stands was first settled as a fishing village by ancestral Tsonga people. It was soon named Lourenço Marques, after the navigator of the same name who explored the area in 1544. The modern city traces its origins to a Portuguese fort established on the site in 1781. A town grew around the fort starting around 1850, and in 1877 it was elevated to city status. In 1898, the colony of Portuguese Mozambique relocated its capital there. In the late 19th and early 20th centuries, Lourenço Marques grew both in population and economic development as a port city. Upon Mozambican independence in 1975, the city became the national capital and was renamed Maputo. During the Mozambican Civil War, the city's economy was devastated. When the war ended, the FRELIMO government launched a program to revive the city's economy, and to clean up the city by forcibly removing criminals, squatters, and undocumented residents.

Maputo has a number of landmarks, including Independence Square, City Hall, Maputo Fortress, the central market, Tunduru Gardens, and Maputo Railway Station. Maputo is known as an aesthetically attractive, if dilapidated, city. With wide avenues lined by jacaranda and acacia trees, it has earned the nicknames City of Acacias and the Pearl of the Indian Ocean. The city is known for its distinct, eclectic architecture, with Portuguese colonial Neoclassical and Manueline styles alongside modern art deco, bauhaus, tropical modernism and Brutalist buildings. The historic Baixa de Maputo district is the downtown area. Maputo has a vibrant cultural scene, with many restaurants, music and performance venues, and local film industry. Maputo's economy is centred around its port, through which much of Mozambique's imports and exports are shipped. The chief exports include cotton, sugar, chromite, sisal, copra, and hardwood. In addition to trade, the city has robust manufacturing and service sectors. Several colleges and universities are located in Maputo, including Pedagogical University, São Tomás University, Catholic University of Mozambique, and Eduardo Mondlane University, the oldest in the country.

== History ==
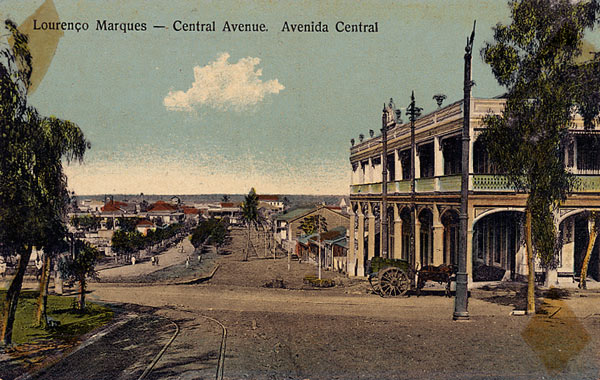
View of Lourenço Marques, c. 1905

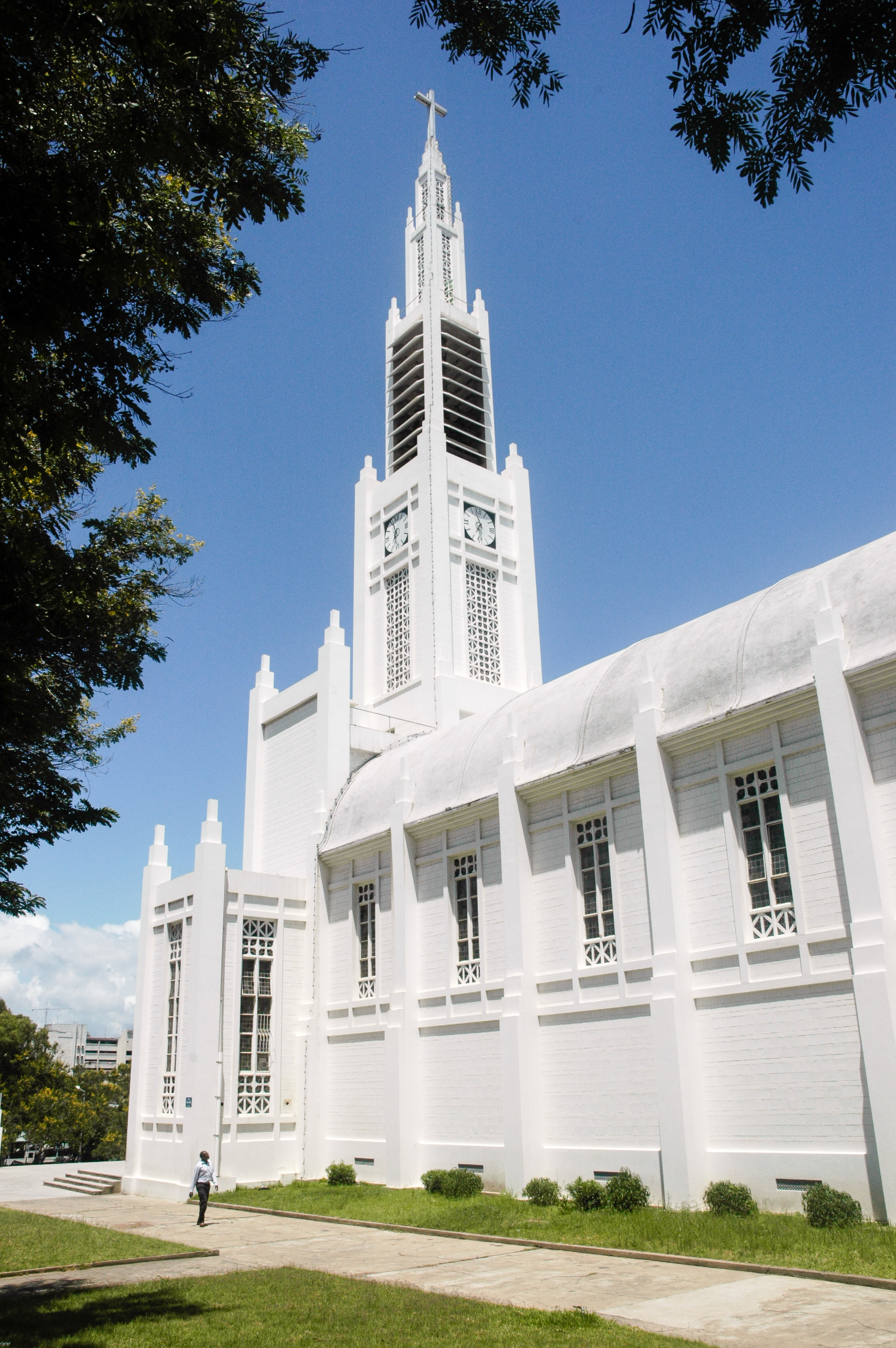
Cathedral of Maputo

On the northern bank of Espírito Santo Estuary of Delagoa Bay, an inlet of the Indian Ocean, Lourenço Marques was named after the Portuguese navigator who, with António Caldeira, was sent in 1544 by the governor of Mozambique on a voyage of exploration. They explored the lower courses of the rivers emptying their waters into Delagoa Bay, notably the Espírito Santo. The forts and trading stations that the Portuguese established, abandoned and reoccupied on the north bank of the river were all named "Lourenço Marques". The existing town dates from about 1850, with the previous settlement having been entirely destroyed by the natives. The town developed around a Portuguese fortress completed in 1787.

In 1871, the town was described as a poor place, with narrow streets, fairly good flat-roofed houses, grass huts, decayed forts, and a rusty cannon, enclosed by a recently erected wall 1.8 metres (6 ft) high and protected by bastions at intervals. The growing importance of the Transvaal led, however, to greater interest being taken back in Portugal in the development of a port. A commission was sent by the Portuguese government in 1876 to drain the marshy land near the settlement, to plant the blue gum tree, and to build a hospital and a church. A city since 1887, it superseded the Island of Mozambique as the capital of Mozambique in 1898. In 1895, the opening of the NZASM railroad to Pretoria, South Africa, caused the city's population to grow. The Witwatersrand Gold Rush, which began in 1886, also increased the economic development of the city in the late 19th and early 20th centuries as Lourenço Marques served as the closest seaport for the export of gold from South Africa.

On 9 December 1876, Lourenço Marques was elevated to the status of town ("vila" in Portuguese), and on 10 November 1887 it became a city.

The Luso-British conflict for the possession of Lourenço Marques ended on 24 July 1875 with Patrice de MacMahon, the French President, ruling in favour of Portugal.

In the early 20th century, with a well-equipped seaport, with piers, quays, landing sheds and electric cranes which enabled large vessels to discharge cargoes direct into the railway trucks, Lourenço Marques developed under Portuguese rule and achieved great importance as a lively cosmopolitan city. It was served by British, Portuguese, and German liners, and the majority of its imported goods were shipped to Southampton, Lisbon, and Hamburg.

With the continuous growth of the city's population due to its expanding economy centred on the seaport, from the 1940s Portugal's administration built a network of primary and secondary schools, industrial and commercial schools as well as the first university in the region. The University of Lourenço Marques was opened in 1962. Portuguese, Islamic (including Ismailis), Indian (including from Portuguese India) and Chinese (including Macanese) communities — but not the unskilled African majority — achieved great prosperity by developing the industrial and commercial sectors of the city. Urban areas of Mozambique grew quickly in this period due to the lack of restriction on the internal migration of indigenous Mozambicans, a situation that differed from the apartheid policies of neighbouring South Africa.

Before Mozambique's independence in 1975, thousands of tourists from South Africa and Rhodesia (now Zimbabwe) frequented the city and its scenic beaches, high-quality hotels, restaurants, casinos, and brothels.

The Mozambique Liberation Front, or FRELIMO, formed in Tanzania in 1962 and led by Eduardo Mondlane, fought for independence from Portuguese rule. The Mozambican War of Independence lasted over 10 years, ending only in 1974 when the Estado Novo regime was overthrown in Lisbon by a leftist military coup — the Carnation Revolution. The new government of Portugal granted independence to almost all Portuguese overseas territories (except for Timor Leste and Macau).

The words "Aqui é Portugal" (Here is Portugal) were once inscribed on the walkway of its municipal building.

=== Independence ===
The People's Republic of Mozambique was proclaimed on 25 June 1975 in accordance with the Lusaka Accord signed in September 1974. A parade and a state banquet completed the independence festivities in the capital, which was expected to be renamed Can Phumo, or "Place of Phumo", after a Shangaan chief who lived in the area before the Portuguese navigator Lourenço Marques first visited the site in 1545 and gave his name to it. However, after independence, the city's name was changed (in February 1976) to Maputo. Maputo's name reputedly has its origin in the Maputo River: in fact, this river, which marks the border with South Africa in the southernmost extent of Mozambique, had become symbolic during the FRELIMO-led armed struggle against Portuguese sovereignty, after the motto «Viva Moçambique unido, do Rovuma ao Maputo», that is, Hail Mozambique, united from Rovuma down to Maputo (Rovuma is the river which marks the northern border with Tanzania).

== Geography ==
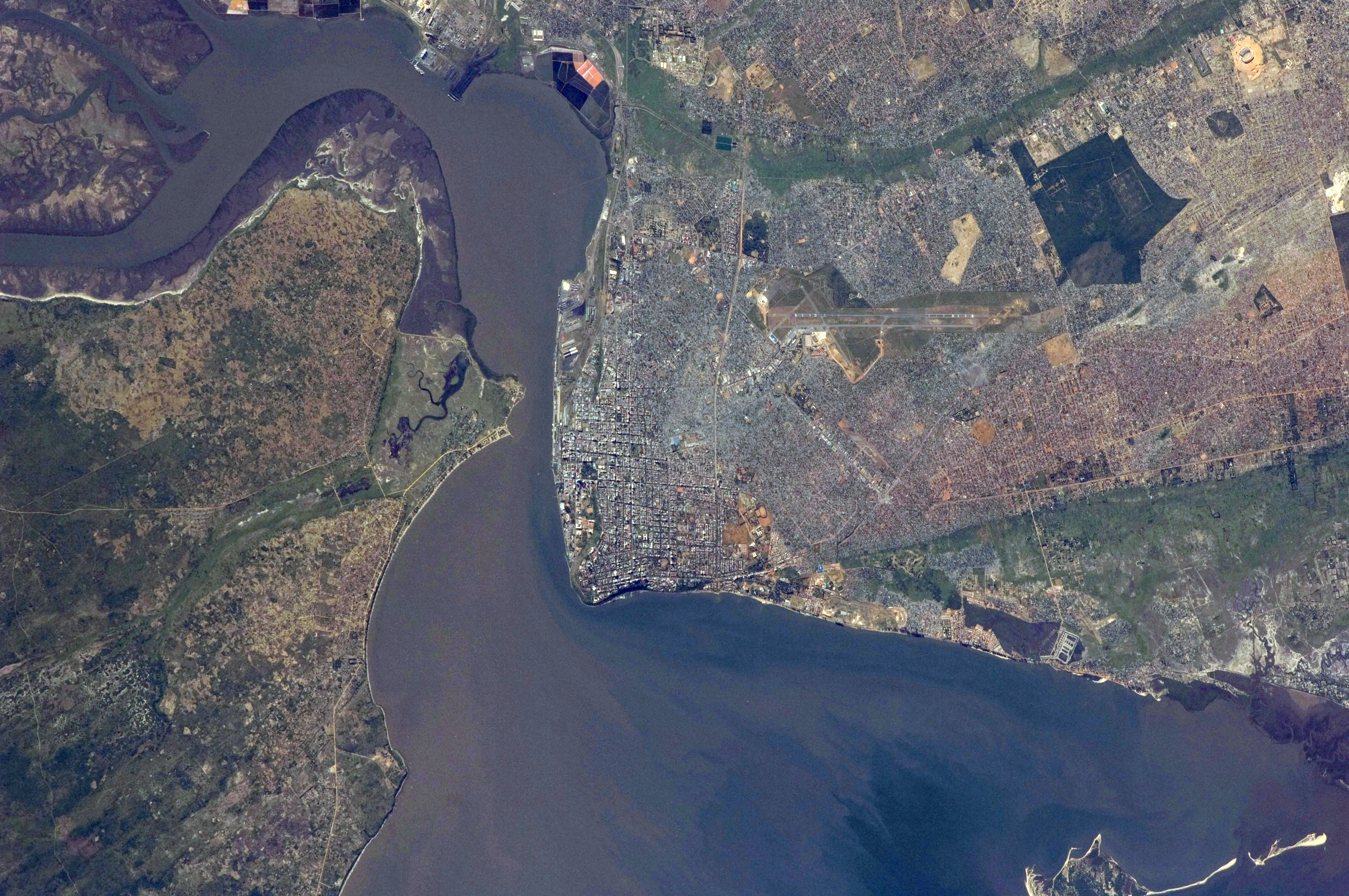
Maputo, seen from the International Space Station

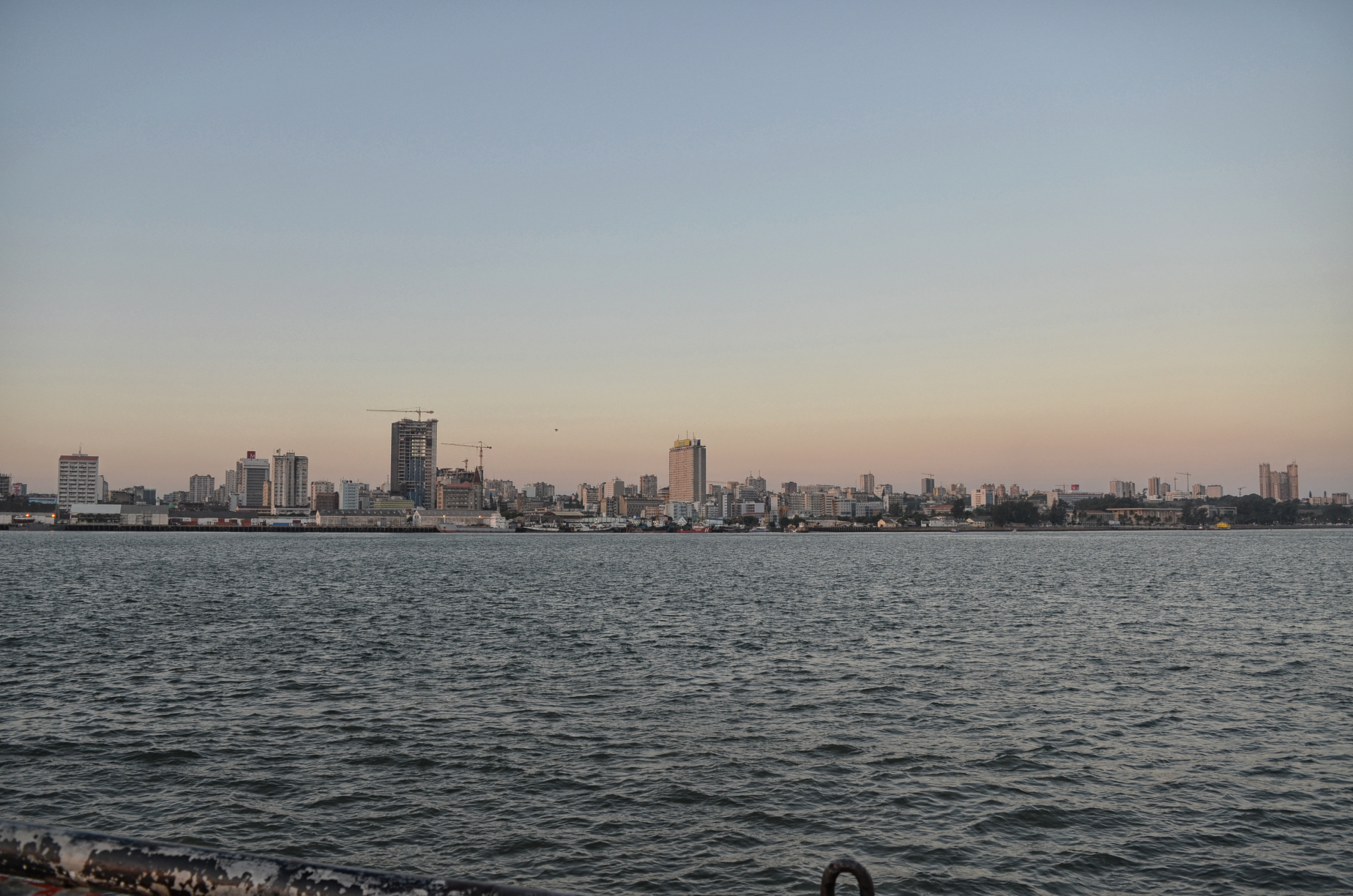
A view of the city

Maputo is located on the west side of Maputo Bay, near the Estuário do Espírito Santo where the four rivers Tembe, Umbeluzi, Matola and Infulene drain. The bay is 95 kilometres (59 miles) long and 30 kilometres (19 miles) wide. At the extreme east of the city and bay is the island of Inhaca. The total area covered by the municipality of Maputo is 346 square kilometres (134 sq mi) and borders the city of Matola northeast and east, the districts of Marracuene to the north; Boane in the east and Matutuíne at the south all of which are part of Maputo Province. The city is 120 km (75 miles) from the South African border at Ressano Garcia and 80 km (50 miles) from the border with Eswatini near the town of Namaacha.

=== Climate ===
Maputo features a tropical savanna climate (Aw) under the Köppen climate classification, having enough precipitation to prevent it from being classified as a hot semi-arid climate (BSh). Maputo is a relatively dry city, averaging 829.6 mm (32.7 in) of precipitation per year. Precipitation is abundant during summer and sparse during winter. The city has a relatively warm climate averaging a mean temperature of 22.8 °C (73.0 °F). The hottest month is January with a mean temperature of 26.8 °C (80.2 °F), while the coolest month is July with a mean temperature of 18.8 °C (65.8 °F).

Climate data for Maputo (Maputo International Airport) (1991–2020 normals, extremes 2007–2023)
Month	Jan	Feb	Mar	Apr	May	Jun	Jul	Aug	Sep	Oct	Nov	Dec	Year
Record high °C (°F)	43.6 (110.5)	40.7 (105.3)	39.1 (102.4)	38.1 (100.6)	39.2 (102.6)	35.7 (96.3)	35.8 (96.4)	38.9 (102.0)	41.1 (106.0)	42.0 (107.6)	41.4 (106.5)	44.2 (111.6)	44.2 (111.6)
Mean daily maximum °C (°F)	30.8 (87.4)	31.4 (88.5)	30.8 (87.4)	29.7 (85.5)	28.2 (82.8)	26.5 (79.7)	26.1 (79.0)	26.7 (80.1)	28.3 (82.9)	27.8 (82.0)	28.9 (84.0)	30.7 (87.3)	28.8 (83.9)
Daily mean °C (°F)	26.6 (79.9)	26.8 (80.2)	26.1 (79.0)	23.9 (75.0)	21.9 (71.4)	20.0 (68.0)	19.7 (67.5)	20.4 (68.7)	22.2 (72.0)	23.1 (73.6)	24.3 (75.7)	25.9 (78.6)	23.4 (74.1)
Mean daily minimum °C (°F)	22.3 (72.1)	22.9 (73.2)	21.2 (70.2)	19.2 (66.6)	16.8 (62.2)	14.9 (58.8)	14.1 (57.4)	14.9 (58.8)	17.3 (63.1)	18.4 (65.1)	19.9 (67.8)	21.5 (70.7)	18.6 (65.5)
Record low °C (°F)	17.2 (63.0)	18.1 (64.6)	15.9 (60.6)	11.4 (52.5)	8.0 (46.4)	6.7 (44.1)	7.9 (46.2)	8.9 (48.0)	11.2 (52.2)	12.2 (54.0)	13.5 (56.3)	16.5 (61.7)	6.7 (44.1)
Average precipitation mm (inches)	171.1 (6.74)	130.5 (5.14)	125.6 (4.94)	59.5 (2.34)	31.9 (1.26)	17.6 (0.69)	19.6 (0.77)	15.0 (0.59)	44.4 (1.75)	59.7 (2.35)	81.7 (3.22)	85.0 (3.35)	841.6 (33.14)
Average precipitation days (≥ 1.0 mm)	8.1	7.6	7.0	4.4	2.8	2.4	1.8	2.2	3.2	5.5	7.9	7.5	60.4
Average relative humidity (%)	76	76	77	76	74	73	72	71	73	75	75	74	74
Mean monthly sunshine hours	223	210	225	229	253	246	256	252	228	210	198	220	2,750
Source 1: Deutscher Wetterdienst (precipitation and humidity 1961–1990) Starlings Roost Weather
Source 2: Danish Meteorological Institute (sun only)

=== Climate change ===
A 2019 paper published in PLOS One estimated that under Representative Concentration Pathway 4.5, a "moderate" scenario of climate change where global warming reaches ~2.5–3 °C (4.5–5.4 °F) by 2100, the climate of Maputo in the year 2050 would most closely resemble the current climate of Goiânia in Brazil. The annual temperature would increase by 1.8 °C (3.2 °F), and the temperature of the warmest month by 1.5 °C (2.7 °F), while the temperature of the coldest month would increase by 0.3 °C (0.54 °F). According to Climate Action Tracker, the current warming trajectory appears consistent with 2.7 °C (4.9 °F), which closely matches RCP 4.5.

Moreover, Maputo is particularly vulnerable to impacts such as cyclones and flooding caused by sea level rise. Poverty and inequality, which are concentrated in the overpopulated bairros, further exacerbate climate change vulnerabilities in the city. According to the 2022 IPCC Sixth Assessment Report, Maputo is one of 12 major African cities (Abidjan, Alexandria, Algiers, Cape Town, Casablanca, Dakar, Dar es Salaam, Durban, Lagos, Lomé, Luanda and Maputo) which would be the most severely affected by future sea level rise. It estimates that they would collectively sustain cumulative damages of US$65 billion under RCP 4.5 and US$86.5 billion for the high-emission scenario RCP 8.5 by the year 2050. Additionally, RCP 8.5 combined with the hypothetical impact from marine ice sheet instability at high levels of warming would involve up to US$137.5 billion in damages, while the additional accounting for the "low-probability, high-damage events" may increase aggregate risks to US$187 billion for the "moderate" RCP4.5, US$206 billion for RCP8.5 and US$397 billion under the high-end ice sheet instability scenario. Since sea level rise would continue for about 10,000 years under every scenario of climate change, future costs of sea level rise would only increase, especially without adaptation measures.

== Administrative subdivisions ==
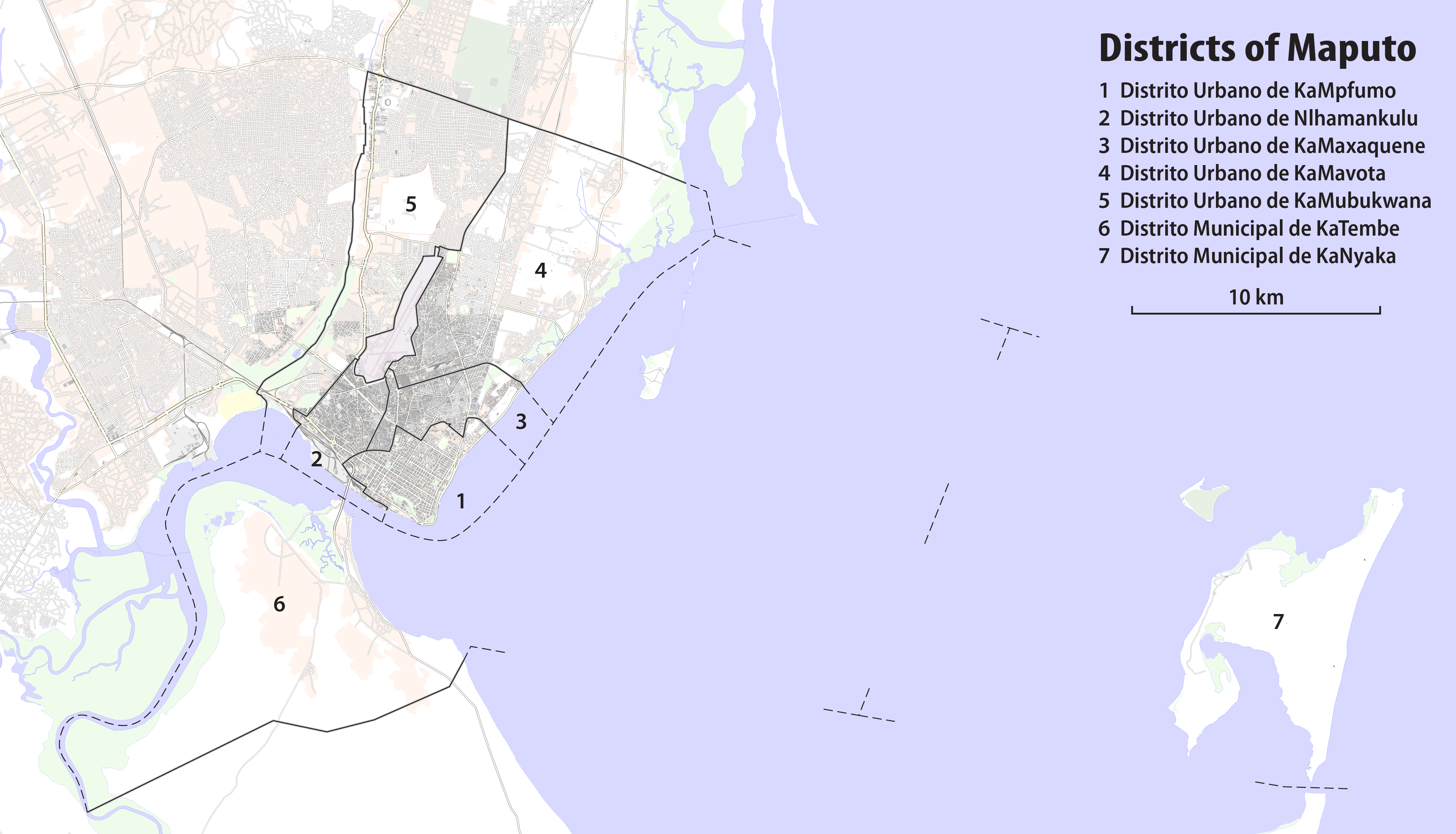
Districts of Maputo

The city is divided into seven main administrative divisions. Each of these consists of several smaller city quarters or bairros.

Administrative Division	City Quarters or Bairros
KaMpfumo	Central A/B/C – Alto Maé A/B – Malhangalene A/B – Polana Cimento A/B – Coop – Sommerschield
Nlhamankulu	Aeroporto A/B – Xipamanine – Minkadjuíne – Unidade 7 – Chamanculo A/B/C/D – Malanga – Munhuana
KaMaxaquene	Mafalala – Maxaquene A/B/C/D – Polana Caniço A/B – Urbanização
KaMavota	Mavalane A/B – FPLM – Hulene A/B – Ferroviário – Laulane – 3 de Fevereiro – Mahotas – Albazine – Costa do Sol
KaMubukwana	Bagamoyo – George Dimitrov (Benfica) – Inhagoia A/B – Jardim – Luís Cabral – Magoanine – Malhazine – Nsalene – 25 de Junho A/B(Choupal) – Zimpeto
KaTembe	Gwachene – Chale – Inguice – Ncassene – Xamissava
KaNyaka	Ingwane – Ribjene – Nhaquene

== Infrastructure ==
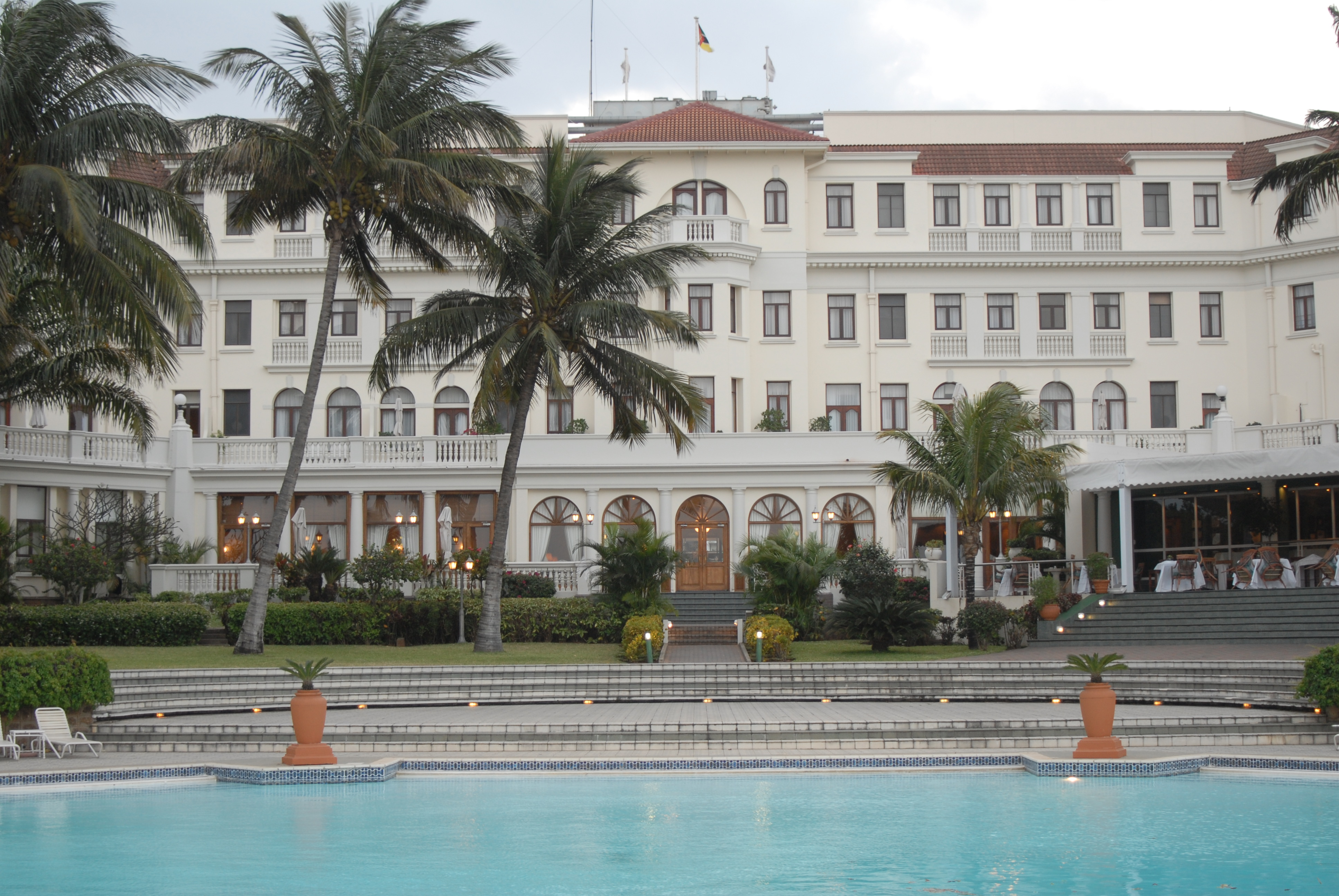
The Hotel Polana

Central Bank of Mozambique

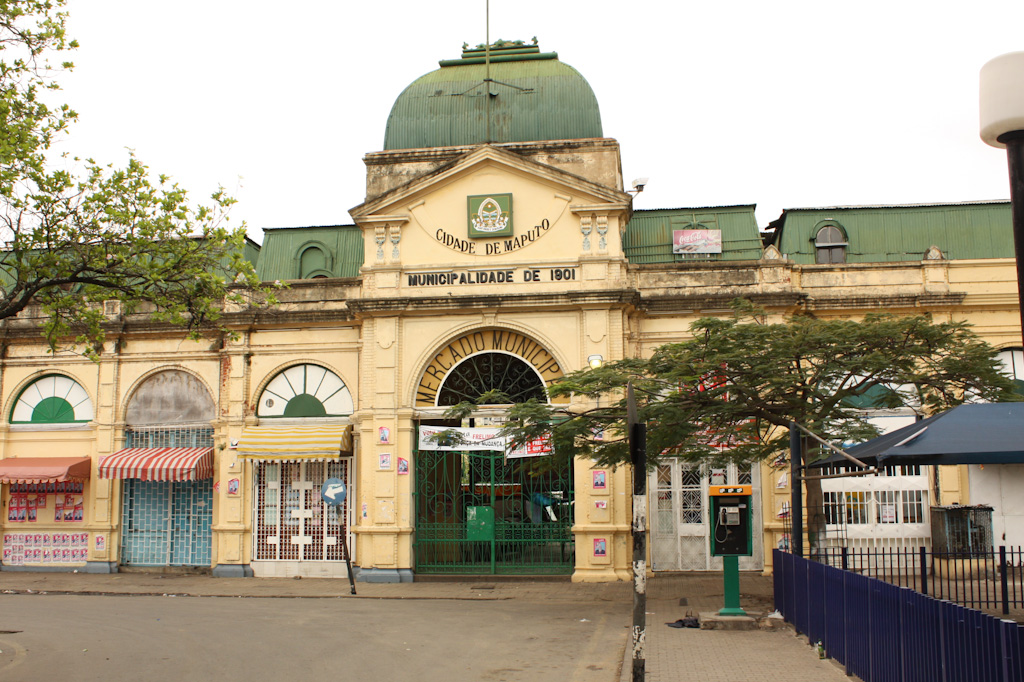
Municipal Market of Maputo

The central area of Maputo is a planned city with square blocks and wide avenues, with Portuguese traces and their typical architecture of the 1970s. After the Carnation Revolution (1974) military coup in Lisbon, Portuguese refugees fled in massive numbers close to the date of independence (1975), and the resultant lack of skills and capital, in the context of a fierce civil war and government mismanagement, contributed to its state of dereliction in the years following these events.

Recovery of the older infrastructure has been slow and most property developers in recent years have decided to invest in the construction of new properties rather than rehabilitating any of the existing ones. The rates for property in the city are high as investment increases, larger numbers of businesses are hoping to locate within easy reach of the airports, banks and other facilities.

Maputo faces many challenges, such as poor transport and drainage infrastructure, which have profound implications on people's livelihoods, particularly in informal settlements. Inadequate planning regulation and law enforcement, as well as perceived corruption in government processes, lack of communication across government departments and lack of concern or government coordination with respect to building codes are major impediments to progressing the development of Maputo's infrastructure, according to the Climate & Development Knowledge Network.

As a coastal city, Maputo is particularly vulnerable to the impacts of sea level rise, and population growth is putting increasing pressure on the coastal areas.

=== PROMAPUTO ===
In 2007, the municipality of Maputo began a project to seriously consider rehabilitating the city's infrastructure. PROMAPUTO was a project that began as co-operation between the local city council and the International Development Association (IDA) of the World Bank. The first phase (PROMAPUTO1) took place between 2007 and 2010 and was chiefly concerned with developing the systems, knowledge and planning required to support the gradual overhaul of the infrastructure. The project was broken into several key areas and a budget allocated to each of these, namely: Institutional Development, Financial Sustainability, Urban Planning, Urban Infrastructure Investment and Maintenance, Metropolitan Development (services such as waste collection and disposal). The total financial allocation for this phase was US$30 million. Little was done, however.

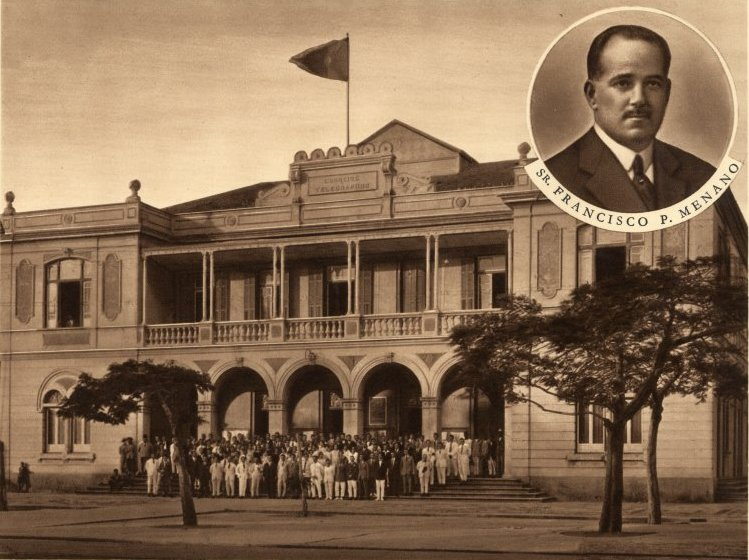
Maputo's central mail station

In 2011, PROMAPUTO2, the second phase of the project began. This phase was to last until 2015 and a total of US$105 million was spent. The plan called for an IT systems, Integrated Financial Management Information System (IFMIS) together with Geographic Information System (GIS). These systems would supposedly help the municipality control its budgets and manage tenders, while the GIS would allow for precise information about land location and titling to be kept. Several roads should have been expanded and improved and the Avenida Julius Nyerere finally completed. Financial sustainability for the project was to be guaranteed through the improved collection of property tax (IPRA). The project also coincided with the recent overhaul of the Road Safety and Traffic Regulations (final completion 2020) which was an antiquated system that had not seen changes since the 1950s. Amongst the new regulations, heavy penalties and fines would now apply to many detrimental actions done by automobiles, such as pollution, loud noises, and illegal maneuvers.

=== Building projects ===
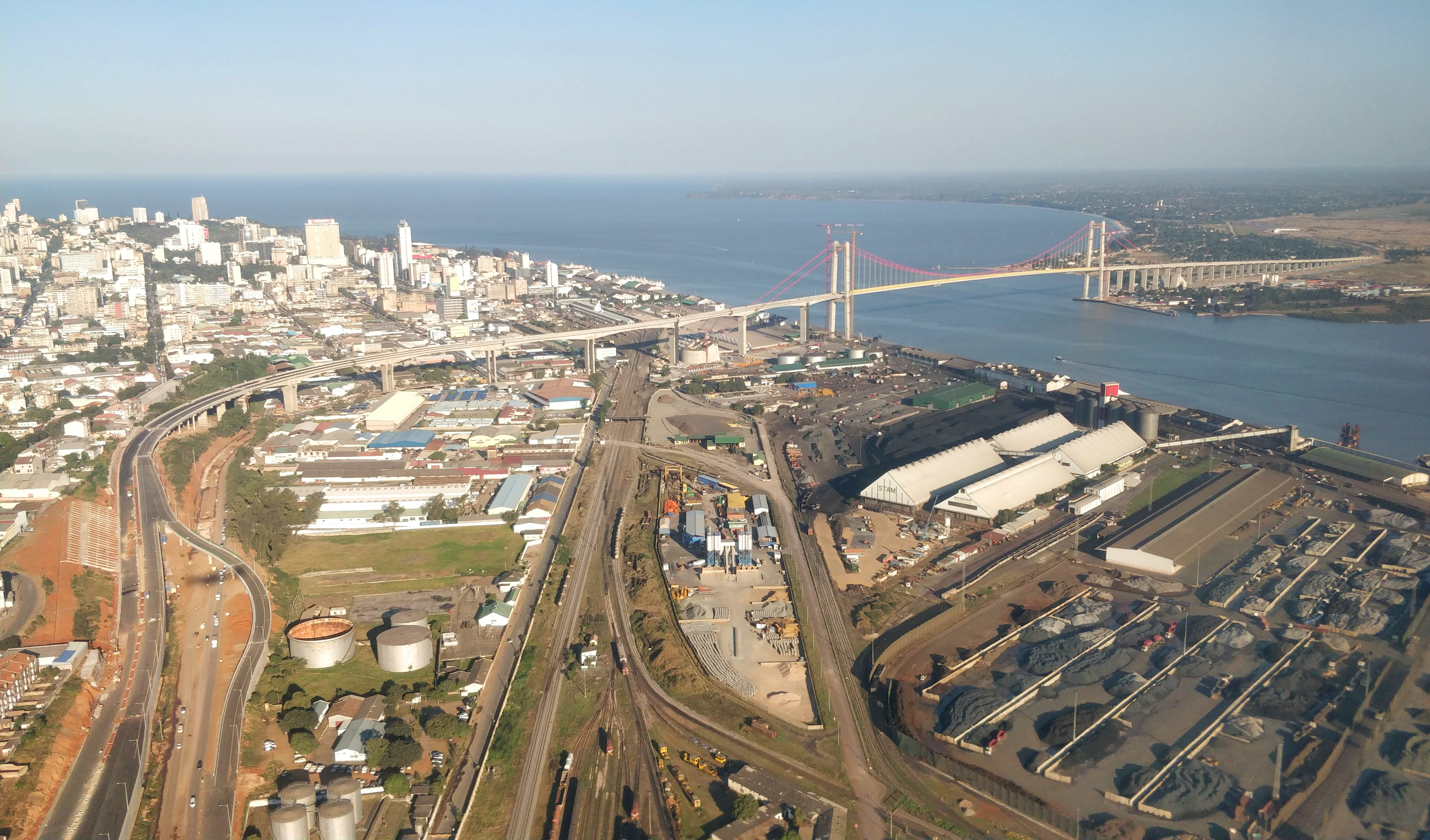
On 10 November 2018, the Maputo–Katembe bridge, Africa's largest suspension bridge, was inaugurated, connecting the center of the city to the urban district of Katembe, on the south bank of the estuary

In spite of its previous instability, Mozambique is experiencing one of the fastest growth rates for a developing country in the world. The projected growth rate for 2011 is expected to be around 7.5%, some of it centered on the construction of several capital intensive projects in Maputo. Some of the more notable developments include Edificio 24, a mixed-use development that will be located at the center of the city along Avenida 24 Julho and Avenida Salvador Allende. The Maputo Business Tower is a modern 19-story building. The Radisson Blu corporation has constructed a 22-story hotel with 256 rooms in one of the city's trendiest spots on the marginal along the beach. A 15-story building for the second largest telecommunication company in the country, Vodacom, was projected to be completed in 2010. The regeneration of the Maputo waterfront is an urban regeneration project that is being developed at site of the former annual industrial fair grounds (FACIM).

=== Rehabilitation projects ===
In February 2011, president Armando Guebuza announced that the Vila Algarve would be restored to its former condition and the building transformed into a museum for the veterans of the civil war. The Vila Algarve belonged to the International and State Defence Police (PIDE) during colonial rule. It was where political prisoners and others accused of conspiring to harm the regime were taken for interrogation and torture. There are claims that several individuals were executed in the building. No dates have been released on when the renovation is to commence. The building has changed ownership several times and has been an off-on residence for squatters.

=== Sports facilities ===
Maputo hosted the 2011 All-Africa Games. The main stadium Estádio do Zimpeto was built in Zimpeto for the Games that also hosted the football and athletics competitions. The Zimpeto Olympic Pool for swimming was also built for these Games. Other venues in Zimpeto for the Games were the Pavilhão do Zimpeto for basketball and Courts do Zimpeto for tennis.

Maputo has a number of stadiums designed for football, which can be modified for other purposes, such as the new Estádio do Zimpeto, Estádio do Maxaquene and the Estádio do Costa do Sol which can seat 32,000, 15,000 and 10,000 people respectively. The largest stadium in the Metropolitan Area is, however, the Estádio da Machava (opened as Estádio Salazar), located in neighbouring Matola municipality. It opened in 1968, in Machava and was at the time the most advanced in the country conforming to standards set by FIFA and the Union Cycliste Internationale (UCI). The cycling track could be adjusted to allow for 20,000 more seats. It was the site where Portugal officially handed over the country to Samora Machel and FRELIMO on 25 June 1975. In 2005, the Birmingham based reggae group UB40 held a one-night-only concert in the stadium filled to maximum capacity. A newer stadium called the Estádio do Zimpeto which is located in the suburb of Zimpeto will be opened in 2011. The stadium will be built in time for the 2011 All-Africa Games with a capacity for 42,000 spectators. A smaller football stadium, Estádio Mahafil, holds 4,000 people.

Beginning in the 1950s, motorsport was introduced to the city. At first race cars would compete in areas around the city, Polana and along the marginal but as funding and interest increased, a dedicated race track was built in the Costa Do Sol area along and behind the marginal with the ocean to the east with a length of 1.5 km (0.9 mi). The initial surface of the new track, named Autódromo de Lourenço Marques did not provide enough grip and a crash in the late 1960s killed eight people and injured many more. Therefore, in 1970, the track was renovated and the surface changed to meet the safety requirements that were needed at large events with many spectators. The length then increased to 3,909 km (2,429 mi). The city became host to several international and local events beginning with the inauguration on 26 November 1970. The track was abandoned after 1975 and events only occurred sporadically such as in 1981 when the government allowed the sport again. Since 2000, interest has been rekindled by the Automovel & Touring Club de Moçambique (ATCM) and several events including go-carting, drag racing and motocross are planned.

The city's main basketball arena is the Pavilhão do Maxaquene which holds up to 3,500 people. It is home to Ferroviário de Maputo which competes in the Basketball Africa League and the Mozambican Basketball League.

=== Street names ===
The street names were changed after independence in 1975. Close ties with the Eastern Bloc highly influenced the new names that were chosen as did removal of names referring to colonial era figures.

Street names in Lourenço Marques and Maputo
Lourenço Marques	Maputo
Avenida 18 de Maio	Avenida Mártires de Inhaminga
Avenida 31 de Janeiro	Avenida Agostinho Neto
Avenida 5 de Outubro	Avenida Josina Machel
Praça 7 de Março	Praça 25 de Junho
Avenida Afonso de Albuquerque	Avenida Ahmed Sekou Touré
Rua Aires de Ornelas	Rua de Kassuende
Rua Alexandre Herculano	Rua Timor Leste
Avenida Almirante Canto e Castro	Avenida da Tanzania
Avenida Álvares Cabral	Avenida Zedequias Manganhela
Museu Álvaro de Castro	Museu de História Natural
Avenida Alves Correia	Avenida da Zambia
Casa Amarela	Museu Nacional da Moeda
Avenida Anchieta	Avenida Olof Palme
Avenida Andrade Corvo	Avenida Ho Chi Min
Escola Andrade Corvo	Escola Primária do 1º e 2º Graus 16 de Junho
Avenida de António Enes	Avenida Julius Nyerere
Liceu António Enes	Escola Secundária Francisco Manyanga
Rua António de Oliveira Salazar	Rua da Mesquita
Cabaret Aquário	Escola Nacional de Dança
Rua Major Araújo	Rua Bagamoyo
Edifício do Atneu Grego	Palácio dos Casamentos
Avenida Augusto de Castilho	Avenida Vladimir Lenine
Rua dos Aviadores	Rua da Argélia
Edifício do Banco Nacional Ultramarino	Banco de Moçambique
Bartolomeu Dias, Rua	Avenida Mártires de Mueda
Belegard da Silva, Avenida	Avenida Francisco O. Magumbwé
Caldas Xavier, Avenida	Avenida Marian N'gouabi
Câmara Municipal, Edifício da	Conselho Executivo
Consiglieri Pedroso, Rua	Rua Revolução de Outubro
Couceiro da Costa, Avenida	Avenida Armando Tivane
Desportivo de Lourenço Marques, Grupo	Grupo Desportivo de Maputo
Dicca, Cinema, Estudio 222	Matchedje Cine-Estúdio 222
Diogo Cão, Avenida	Avenida Lucas Luali
Direcção Geral das Alfândegas, Edifício da	Reitoria da Universidade Eduardo Mondlane
Doutor Serrão, Avenida do	Avenida Emília Daússe
Dr. Brito Camacho, Rua do	Avenida Patrice Lumumba
Dom João de Castro, Avenida	Rua Dom João de Castro
Dom Luiz 1º, Avenida	Avenida Samora Machel
Dom Manuel I, Avenida	Avenida da Marginal
Duques de Connaught, Avenida dos	Avenida Friedrich Engels
Eduardo Costa, Rua	Rua de Mukumbura
Estâncias, Estrada das	Rua das Estâncias
Fazenda, Edifício da	Conselho de Ministros
Fernandes Tomaz, Avenida	Avenida Mártires da Machava
Fonte Luminosa, Praça da	Praça Robert Mugabe
Funchal, Prédio	Hotel Rovuma
Gago Coutinho, Aeroporto	Aeroporto de Mavalane
General Bettencourt, Avenida do	Rua da Base Ntchinga
General Botha, Rua do	Avenida Tomás Nduda
General Craveiro Lopes, Avenida	Avenida dos Accordos de Lusaka
General Machado, Avenida do	Avenida Guerra Popular
General Machado, Escola	Universidade Pedagógica
General Rosado, Rua do	Avenida Kim Il Sung
Gomes Freire, Avenida	Avenida Paulo Samuel Kankhomba
Governador Simas, Rua do	Rua Mateus Sansão Muthemba
Guerra Junqueiro, Rua	Rua José Mateus
Heróis de Marracuene, Rua dos	Rua da Resistência
Hotel Clube	Centro Cultural Franco-Moçambicano
Infante, Cinema	Cinema Charlot
João Albasini, Largo	Praça 21 de Outubro
João Belo, Escola Primária	Escola Primária 7 de Setembro
João das Regras, Rua	Rua de Nachingwea
João de Deus, Avenida	Avenida Romão Fernandes Farinha
José Cabral, Parque	Parque dos Continuadores
Joaquim de Araújo, Escola	Escola Secundária Estrela Vermelha
Lapa, Rua	Rua Joaquim Lapa
Lar Moderno, Edifício do	Centro de Estudos Brasileiro
Latino Coelho, Avenida	Avenida Maguiguana
Lidemburgo, Rua de	Avenida Rio Tembe
Lisboa, Miradouro de	Miradouro
Lisboa, Rua de	Avenida Milagre Mabote
Luciano Cordeiro, Avenida	Avenida Albert Luthuli
Mac Mahon, Praça	Praça dos Trabalhadores
Manuel de Arriaga, Avenida	Avenida Karl Marx
Manuel Rodrigues, Cinema	Cine Teatro África
Massano de Amorim, Avenida	Avenida Mao Tsé Tung
Mendonça Barreto, Avenida	Avenida do Rio Limpopo
Mouzinho de Albuquerque, Praça	Praça da Independência
Nevala, Rua de	Avenida Nkwam Nkruma
Nossa Senhora de Fátima, Avenida	Avenida Kenneth Kaunda
Oliveira Salazar, Estádio	Estádio da Machava
Paiva de Andrada, Avenida	Avenida Mahomed Siad Barre
Paiva Manso, Avenida	Avenida Filipe Samuel Magaia
Pero da Covilhã, Rua	Rua Belmiro O. Muianga
Pero de Alenquer, Rua	Avenida Amílcar Cabral
Pesca Desportiva, Clube de	Escola Náutica de Moçambique
Pinheiro Chagas, Avenida	Avenida Eduardo Mondlane
Porto, Rua do	Rua Malhangalene
Princesa Patrícia, Rua da	Avenida Salvador Allende
Rebelo da Silva, Escola Primária	Escola Primária 3 de Fevereiro
República, Avenida da	Avenida 25 de Setembro
Sagres, Rua de	Avenida 10 de Novembro
Salazar, Liceu	Escola Secundária Josina Machel
Sporting Clube de Lourenço Marques	Clube de Desportos Maxaquene
Turismo, Hotel	Hotel Ibis
Vasco da Gama, Jardim	Jardim Tunduro
Vasco da Gama, Mercado	Mercado Municipal (Bazar da Baixa)

== Transport ==
=== Airports ===
Maputo International Airport is the main international airport of Mozambique. An international terminal was opened in 2010 with a capacity for 900,000 passengers per year; a domestic terminal was completed in 2012.

=== Buses ===
Maputo's transportation needs are mainly served by minibus taxis called chapas, which support a majority of non-walking trips. In an effort to resolve a public transport crisis in the city, the state-owned company, Transporte de Moçambique (TPM) has recently acquired a new fleet of 270+ buses. There are three major bus terminals in the city: at Baixa (downtown/central), Museu (Museum), and at Junta (regional and national buses).

=== Ferries ===
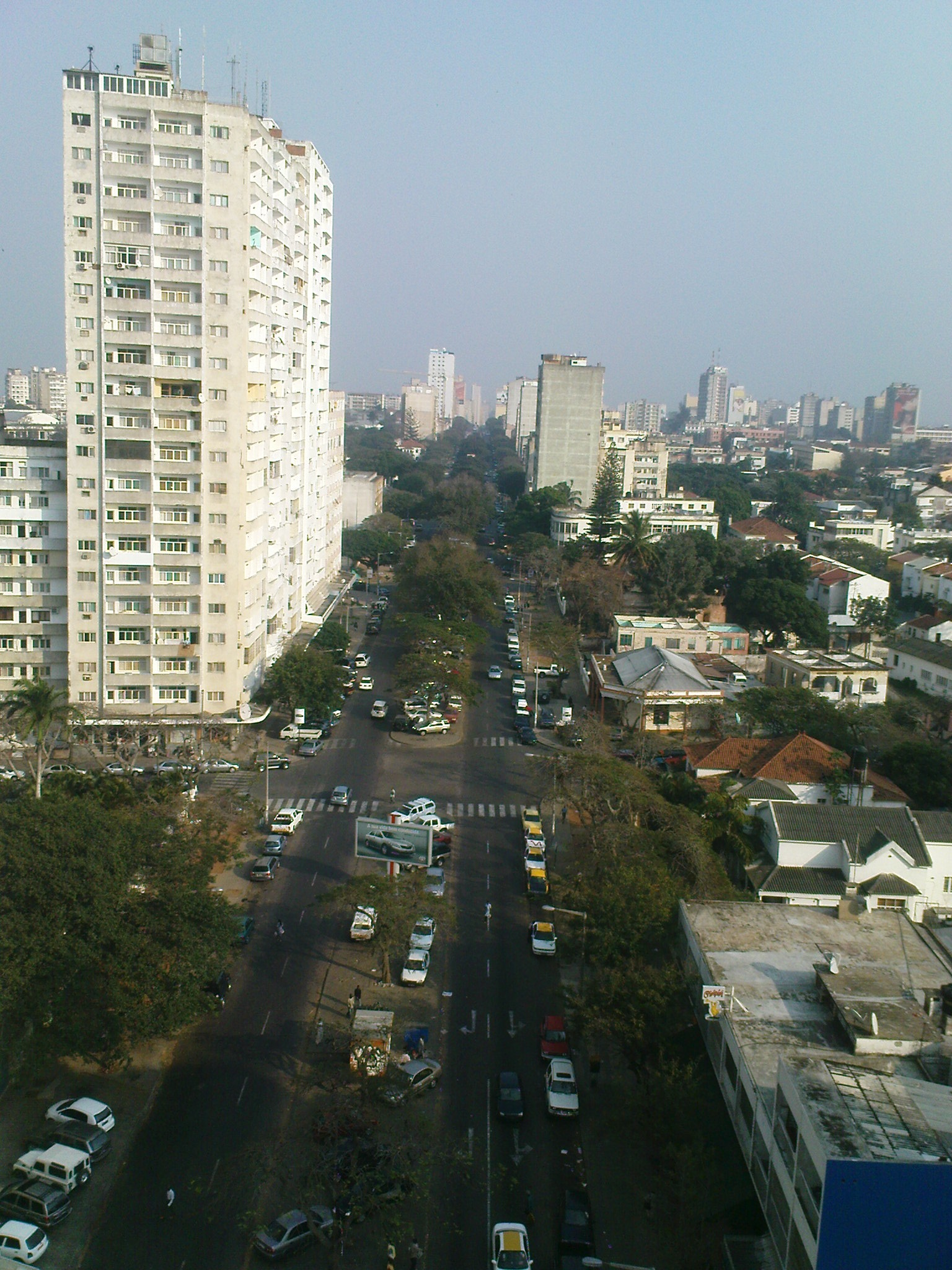
24 de Julho Avenue, Maputo in 2008

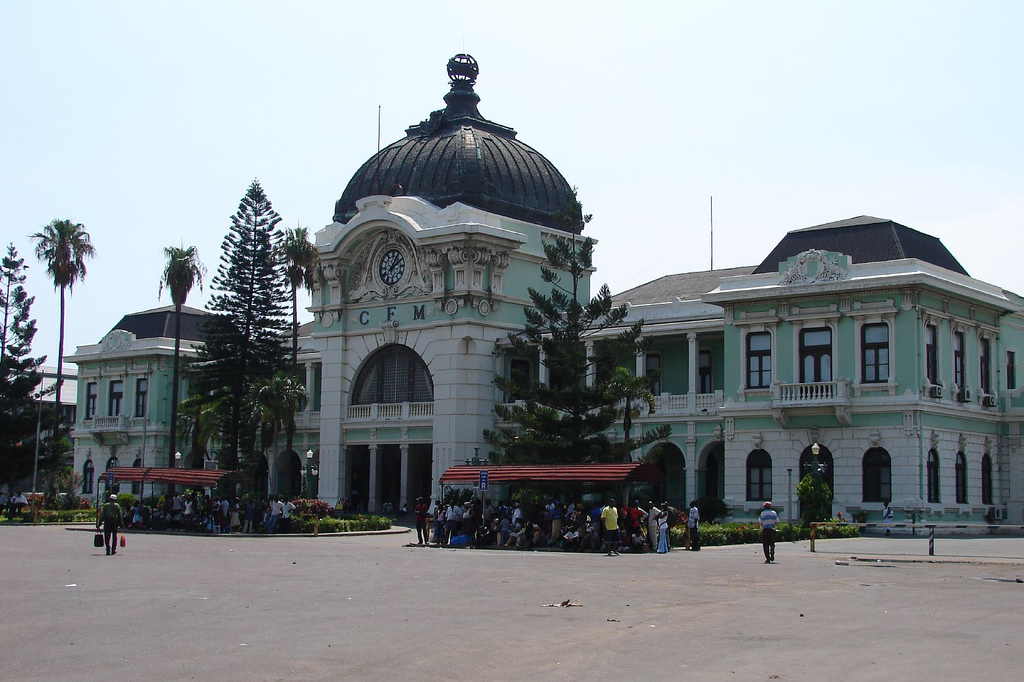
The Maputo Railway Station, an example of colonial architecture

Ferry boats departing from Maputo to the district of KaTembe are available during the week. A ferry can carry approximately 20 vehicles per trip.

=== Rails ===
The city of Maputo lies at the end of three railway lines: Goba railway, Limpopo railway and Pretoria–Maputo railway.

==== Trams ====
Maputo was home to one of the first electric tramway systems in Africa, commencing in February 1904. At first the lines ran from the Central Railway Station (CFM) to the City Municipality building. It is said that the establishment of the tram system caused some protests from the general public as certain classes had limited access to its use. Trams lost favor in the second half of the 20th century as cars and buses became more common, and they have not been in use at all since 1936, although parts of some of the tracks can still be seen coming up through the tar in certain streets, like Av. 24 de Julho.

=== Ports ===
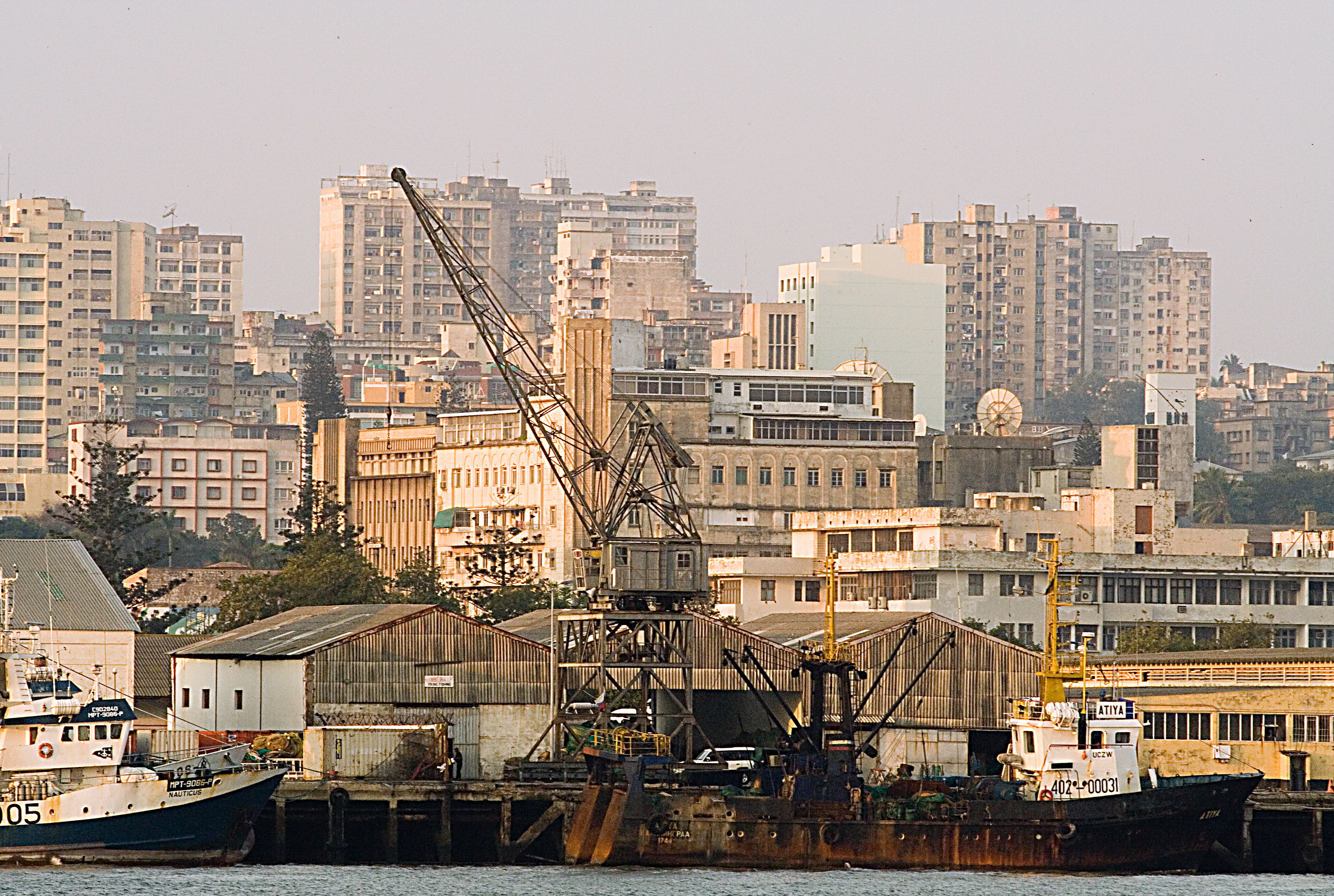
Maputo's harbour is very important economically to the city.

The main port of Maputo handled 17 million tons of cargo in 1971, at its peak. It was part of the trio of Mozambique's main ports for the Nacala-Beira-Maputo route. Today, it is managed by the Maputo Port Development Company (MPDC), a joint venture of Grindrod and DP World. The government has allowed the firm to manage the port until 2030 in order to upgrade much of its infrastructure that has been destroyed after years of stagnation. In 2010, the dredging works in the channel were finished and the Port of Maputo can now handle larger vessels – such as the Panamax vessels – with more cargo. In addition, investments are being made for coal and container terminals.

A new terminal for vehicles was developed, which allowed for over 50,000 vehicles to be moved per year (Phase 1) with a peak 250,000 under an agreement with Höegh Autoliners as a potential trans-shipment route between the Middle East and Europe. Coal will also be exported from the Matola side at a rate of 10 million tons per year. It is envisaged that by 2020, the port will generate about US$160 million per year. By 2030, the port will be able to handle up to 25 trains a day and 1,500 trucks for a total of 50 million tons of cargo per year. The total investment will exceed US$500 million.

=== Other means ===
A recent introduction is three-wheelers commonly known as tuk-tuks in some Asian countries. The three-wheeled bikes, called "tchopelas" by the population, are cheaper to own and run and have posed a commercial threat to conventional taxis.

== Architecture ==
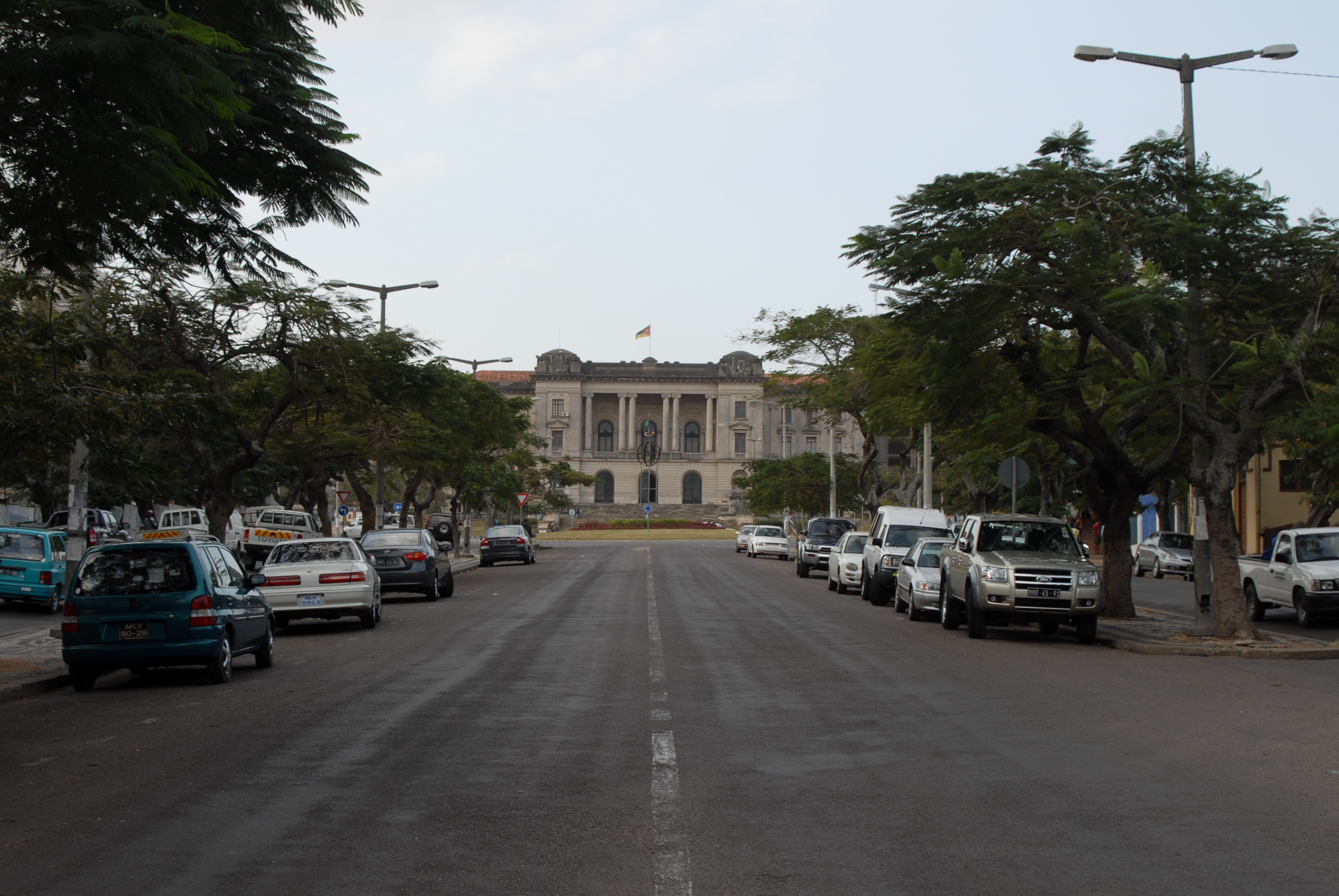
Maputo city council building

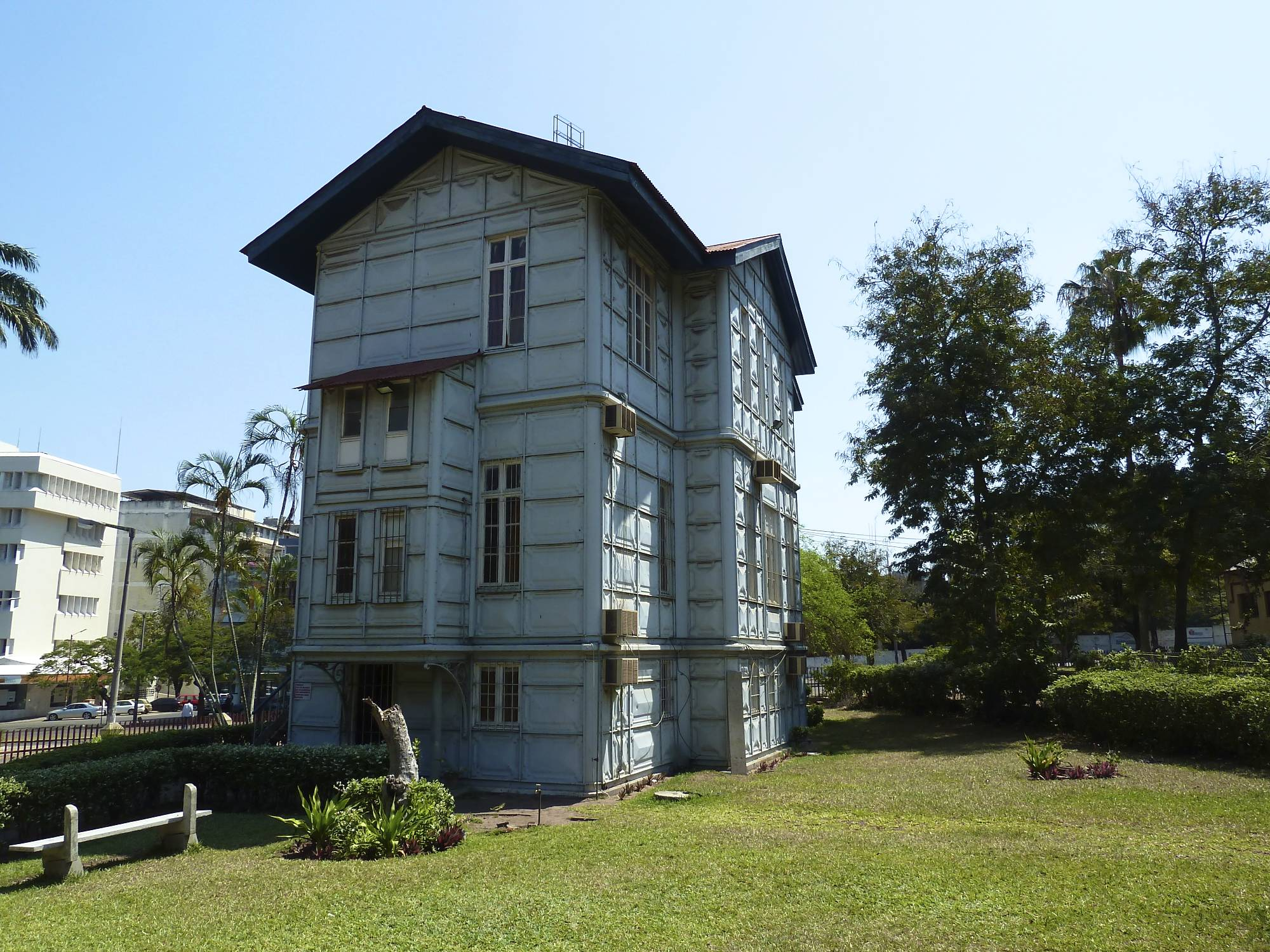
A Casa de Ferro – The Iron House

Maputo had always been the center of attention during its formative years and this strong artistic spirit was responsible for attracting some of the world's most forward architects at the turn of the 20th century. The city is home to masterpieces of building work by Pancho Guedes, Herbert Baker and Thomas Honney, amongst others. The earliest architectural efforts around the city focused on classical European designs such as the Central Train Station (CFM) designed by architects Alfredo Augusto Lisboa de Lima, Mario Veiga and Ferreira da Costa and built between 1913 and 1916 (sometimes mistaken with the work of Gustav Eiffel), and the Hotel Polana designed by Herbert Baker.

As the 1960s and 1970s approached, Maputo was yet again at the center of a new wave of architectural influences made most popular by Pancho Guedes. The designs of the 1960s and 1970s were characterized by modernist and brutalist movements of clean, straight and functional structures. However, prominent architects such as Pancho Guedes fused this with local art schemes giving the city's buildings a unique Mozambican theme. As a result, most of the properties erected during the second construction boom take on these styling cues.

=== Loss of heritage ===
In recent years, the influx of capital into the real estate sector from local and international investors has resulted in the demolition of many historically significant buildings. Single homes along Av. Julius Nyerere, Av. 24 de Julho and Av. Mao Tse Tung have been torn down and high rise residential apartments built in their place. The difficulty in legally expanding the city coupled with a limited heritage building protection framework have been the main impediments. The local government, the City Council of Maputo has been unable to bring order to the situation.

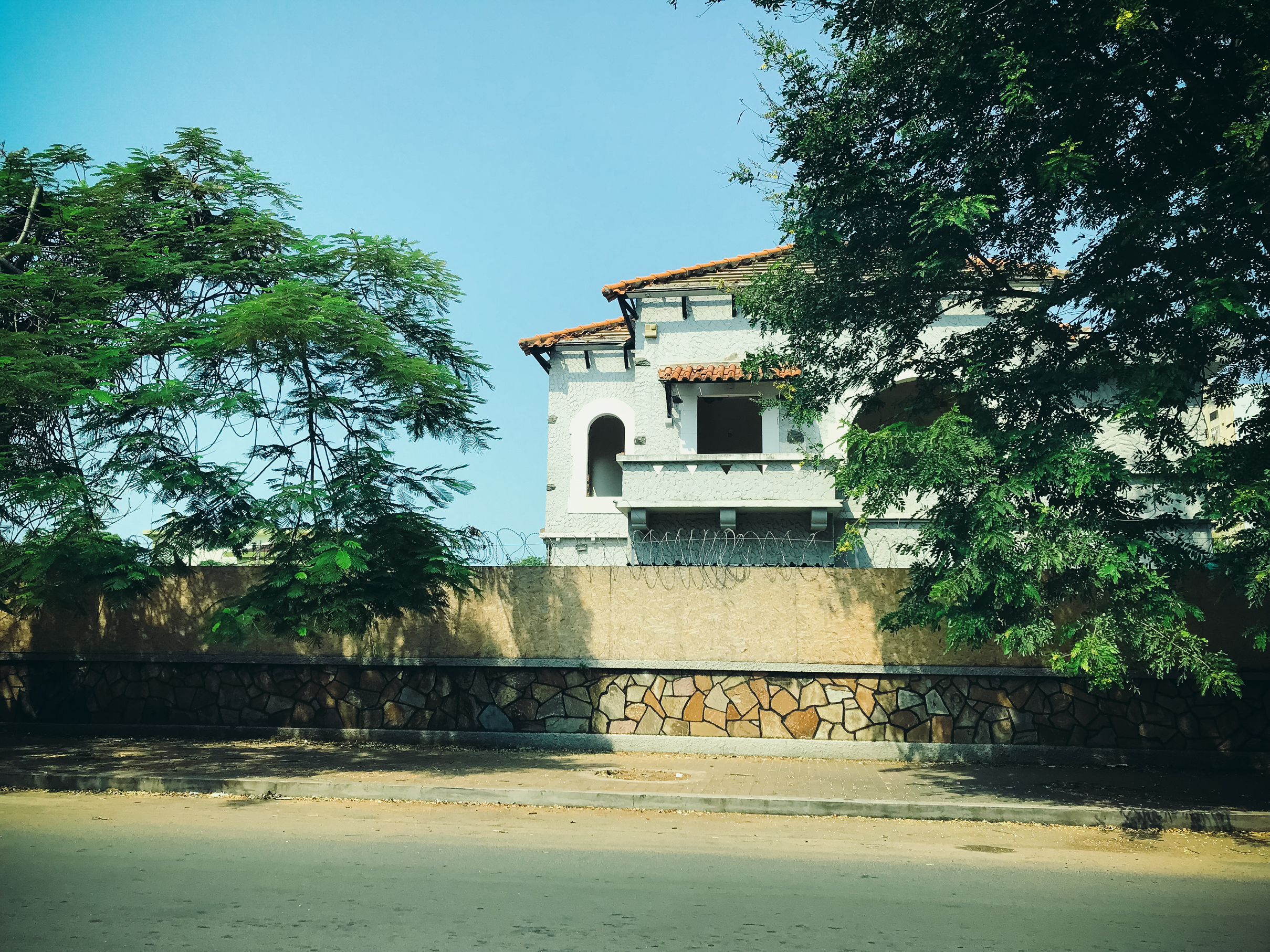
Mansion prepared for demolition Av. Kim Il Sung

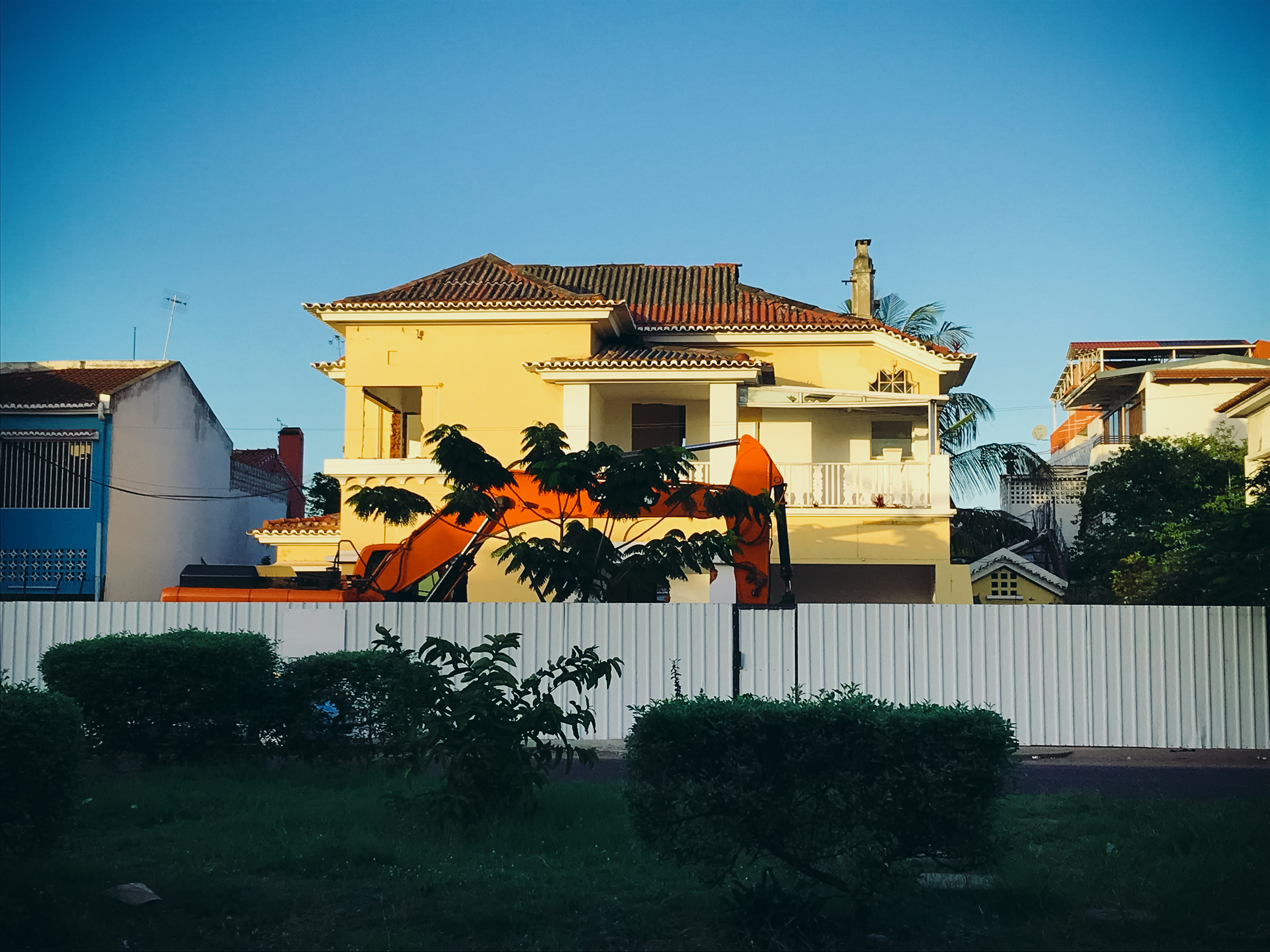
Mansion prepared for demolition Av. Mao Tse Tung

Additionally, many acacia trees that once lined the footpaths and gave the city its distinct identity have also been removed for unclear reasons. The process gains momentum usually in the winter months between June and August under the guise of pruning overgrown trees. Without proper supervision the pruning work is excessive and destructive leading to the eventual loss of the tree.

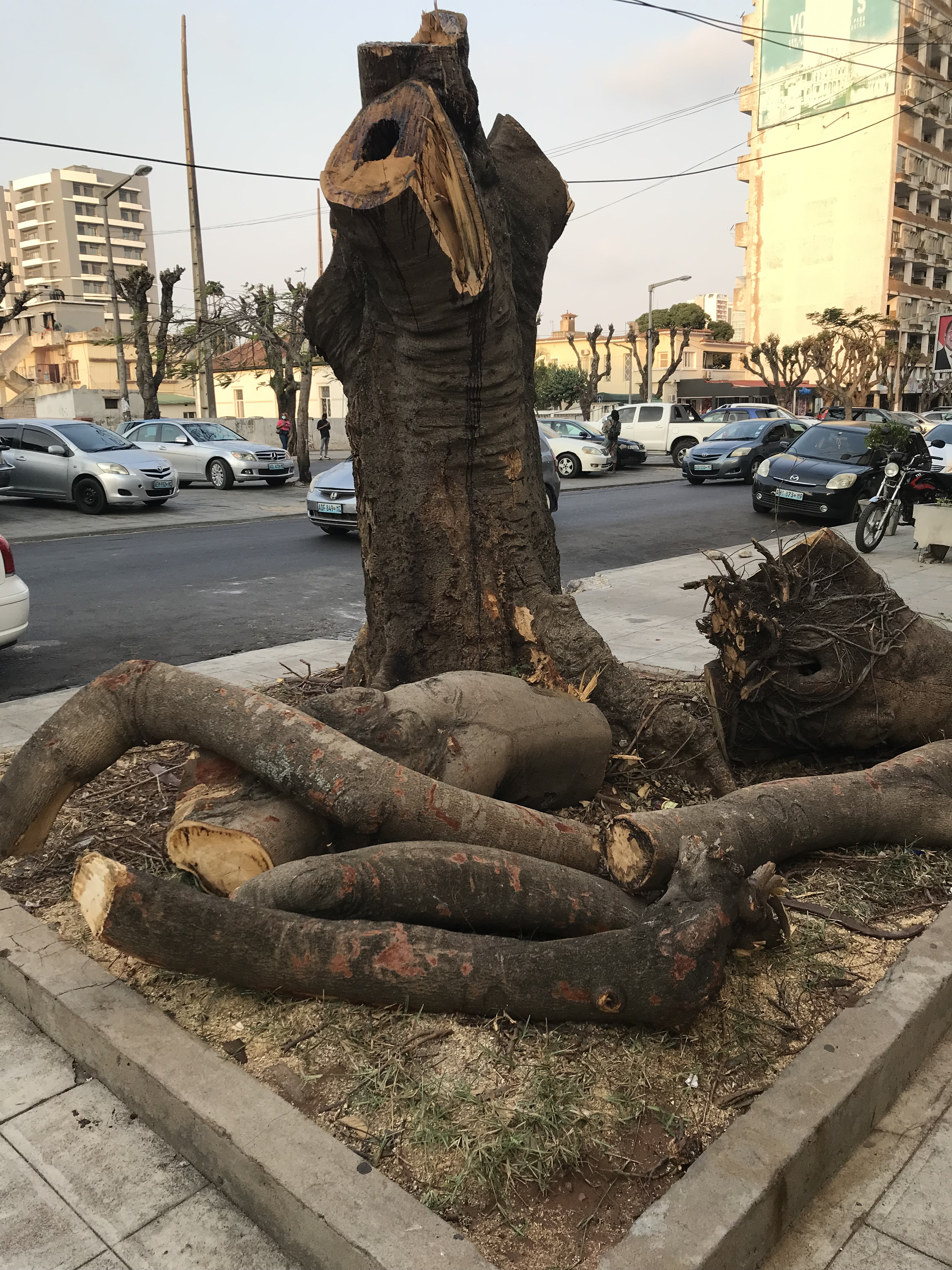
Destructive tree cutting in Maputo

== Culture ==
Maputo is a melting pot of several cultures. The Bantu and Portuguese cultures dominate, but the influence of Arab, Indian, and Chinese cultures is also felt.

=== Film and cinema ===
Before television was introduced in 1981, film and cinema had a prominent position as a form of entertainment in the lives of Mozambicans especially in Maputo where there were at least a dozen movie theaters by the time of independence. In the 1950s and 1960s, at the height of racial segregation, most of the movie-goers were either European whites or South Asians – each group having their own designated locale. Black Mozambicans, although more heavily discriminated against, also enjoyed movies in makeshift theatres, often in rooms temporarily converted to handle a projector, screen and chairs.

For much of the late 1970s and 1980s, the local film industry was geared towards creating "home-made" productions depicting Socialist ideologies which placed great influence on the family unit, the non-commercialized production of agriculture and political autonomy. Maputo has been the setting for many Hollywood blockbuster movies such as The Interpreter, Blood Diamond and Ali.

=== Associação Núcleo de Arte ===
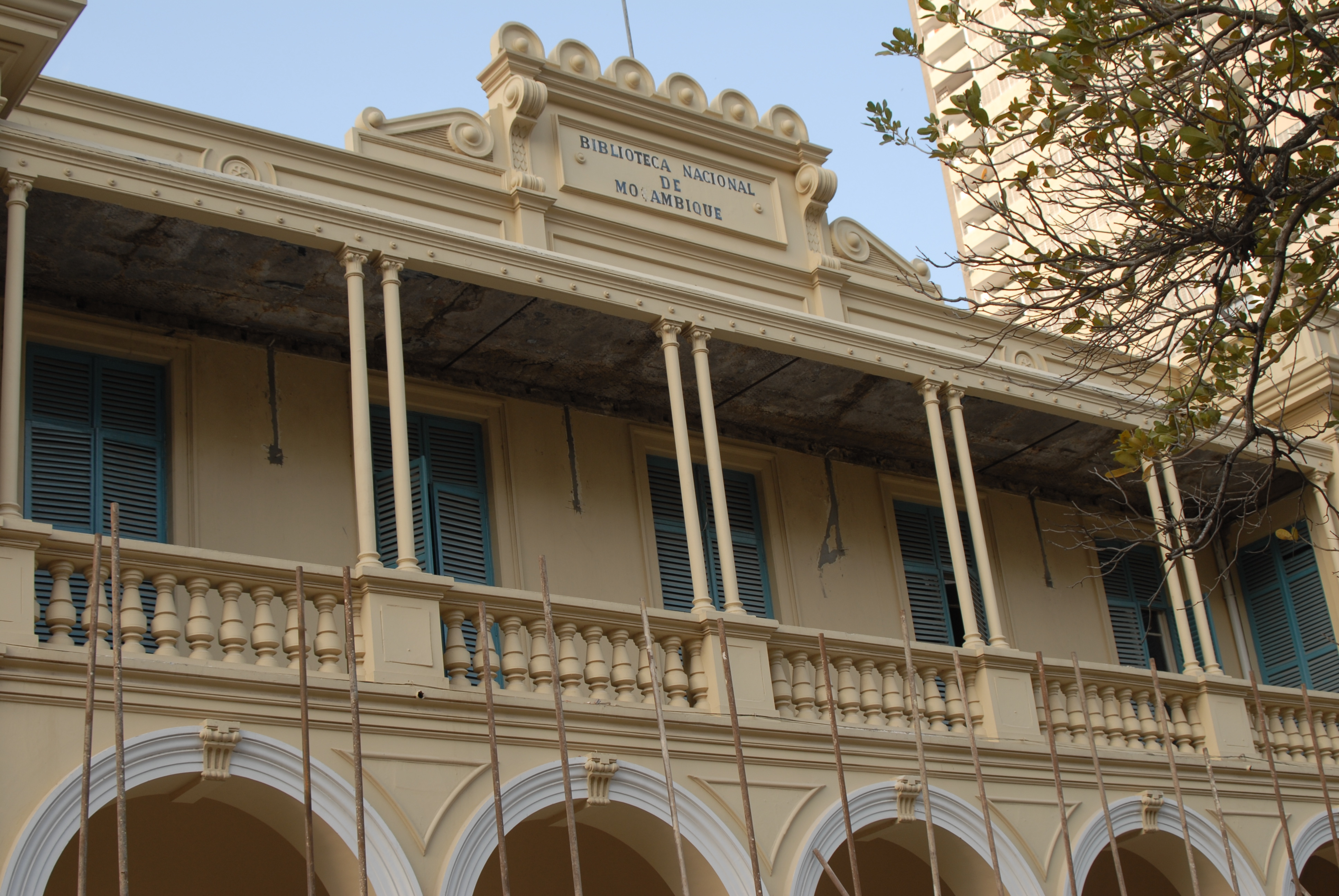
The Mozambique National Library.

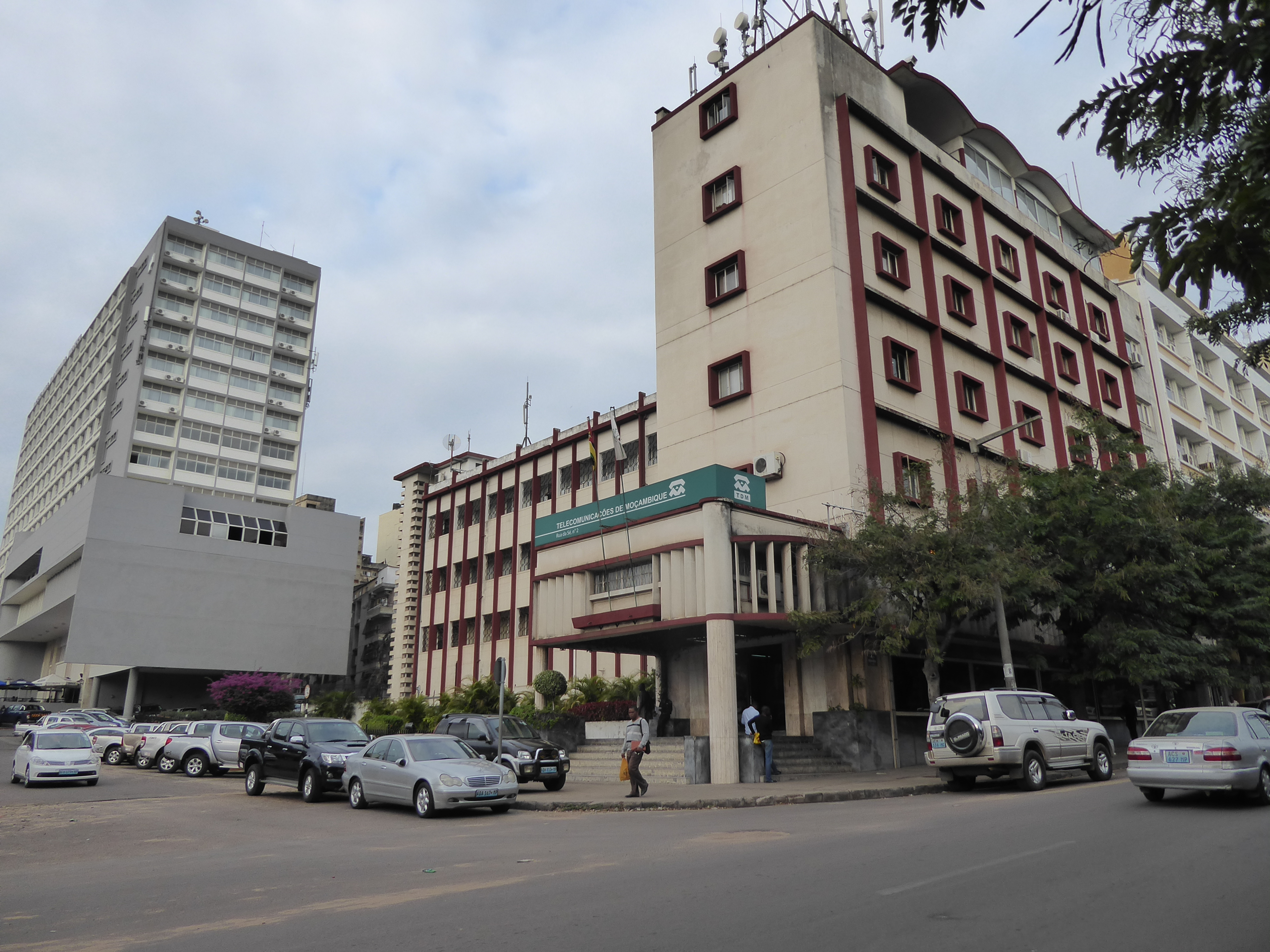
Telecommunications of Mozambique seat in Rua da Sé 2, Maputo

An important cultural and artists' centre in Maputo is the Associação Núcleo de Arte. It is the oldest collective of artists in Mozambique. Seated in an old villa in the centre of Maputo the Núcleo has played a significant role in metropolitan cultural life for decades. The two best known and most influential contemporary Mozambican artists started their career at Núcleo de Arte, the painter Malangatana Ngwenya and the sculptor Alberto Chissano. Over one hundred painters, sculptors and ceramists are members of the Núcleo, which regularly stages exhibitions on its own premises and over the last few years has actively participated in exchanges with artists from abroad. The Núcleo became well known for their project transforming arms into tools and objects of art. It played an important role for reconciliation after the Mozambican Civil War. The exhibition of art objects such as the Chair of the African King and the Tree of Life was shown around the world, among others in the British Museum in 2006. Maputo is home to the Dockanema Documentary Film Festival, and international festival showcasing documentary films from around the world.

=== Handicraft ===
Mozambique's capital is famous for making special small sculptures called "pshikelekedanas" from soft wood using a penknife. These sculptures often depict important animals in Mozambique, like hippos, etc...

== Landmarks ==
During its five centuries of Portuguese colonialization, the city has gained several examples of Portuguese architecture. Most of the noteworthy buildings are former colonial administrative buildings or current government buildings.

The city's notable landmarks include:

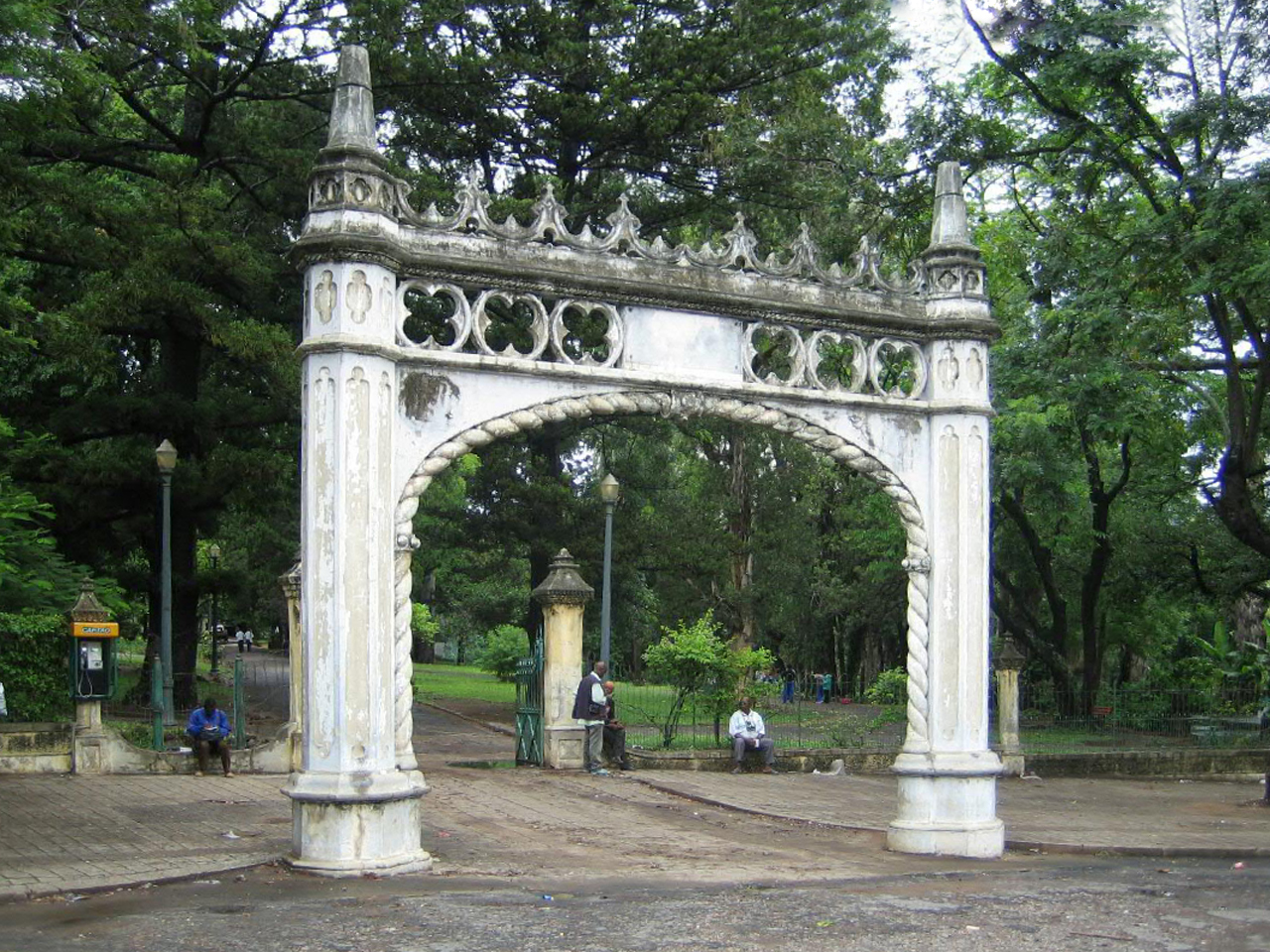
Maputo's Tunduru Garden, with its Manueline arch

- Fortress of Maputo
- Maputo Railway Station
- Independence Square
- Maputo City Hall
- Samora Machel Statue
- The Museum of Natural History
- Vila Algarve – former location of Portuguese Secret Police (PIDE)
- Tunduru Gardens

== Places of worship ==
Among the places of worship, they are predominantly Christian churches and temples : Roman Catholic Archdiocese of Maputo (Catholic Church), Reformed Church in Mozambique (World Communion of Reformed Churches), Igreja Presbiteriana de Moçambique (World Communion of Reformed Churches), Convenção Baptista de Moçambique (Baptist World Alliance), Universal Church of the Kingdom of God, Assemblies of God, Zion Christian Church.

== Parks ==
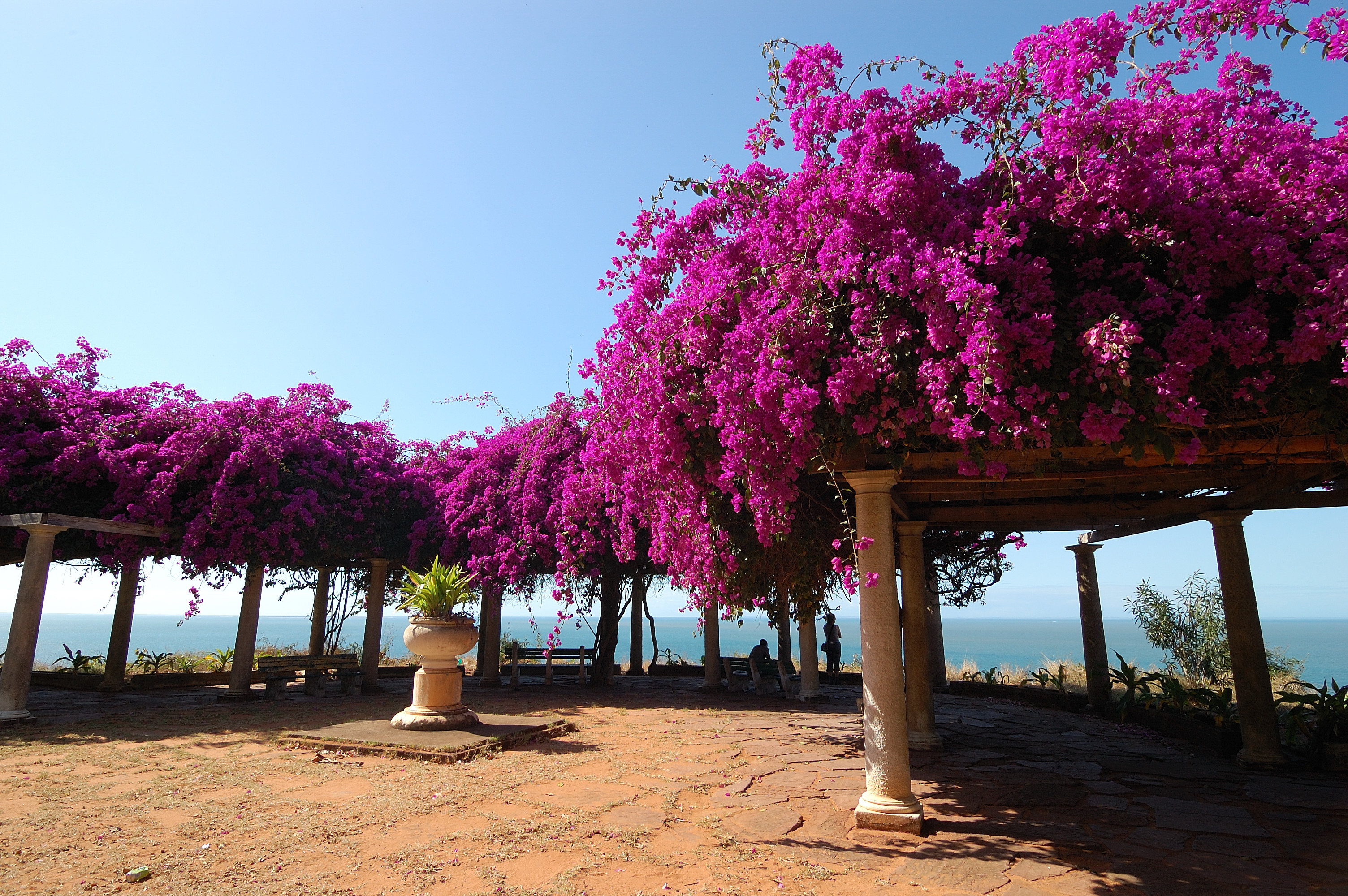
A flowered terrace in Maputo

The city does not yet have a very expansive list of parks and other recreational areas. However, at the center of the city lies the Jardim Tunduru (Tunduru Gardens) which was formerly called the Vasco Da Gama Garden. It was designed in the 1880s by a British architect, Thomas Honney. The entrance of the park is designed in the Neo-Manueline style. After independence, the name was changed to the current one and a statue of the country's first president was erected. The photo adjacent to this paragraph refers to the former Miradouro de Lisboa (Lisbon Belvedere), overlooking the bay in Lourenço Marques (as Maputo was called during Portuguese sovereignty).

== Education ==
Maputo offers several options for education with pre-schools, primary, secondary schools and higher education institutions. The quality of the syllabus is said to differ greatly depending on whether an institution is private or public.

=== Higher education ===
Mozambique's largest higher education institution is the Universidade Eduardo Mondlane which was established in 1968 as the Universidade de Lourenço Marques. Most of the universities faculties and departments are located in the city of Maputo with nearly 8,000 students attending 10 faculties. Some faculties also exist in Beira, Quelimane, Nampula and Inhambane.

Since the 1990s there has also been a rapid growth of private education houses offering higher education such as Instituto Superior de Ciências e Tecnologias de Moçambique (ISCTEM), Instituto Superior de Tecnologias e Gestão (ISTEG) and Instituto Superior de Transportes e Comunicações (ISUTC).

=== Secondary education ===
Maputo's notable private schools include:

- Escola Portuguesa de Moçambique
- American International School of Mozambique
- The Aga Khan Academy, Maputo

== Health services ==
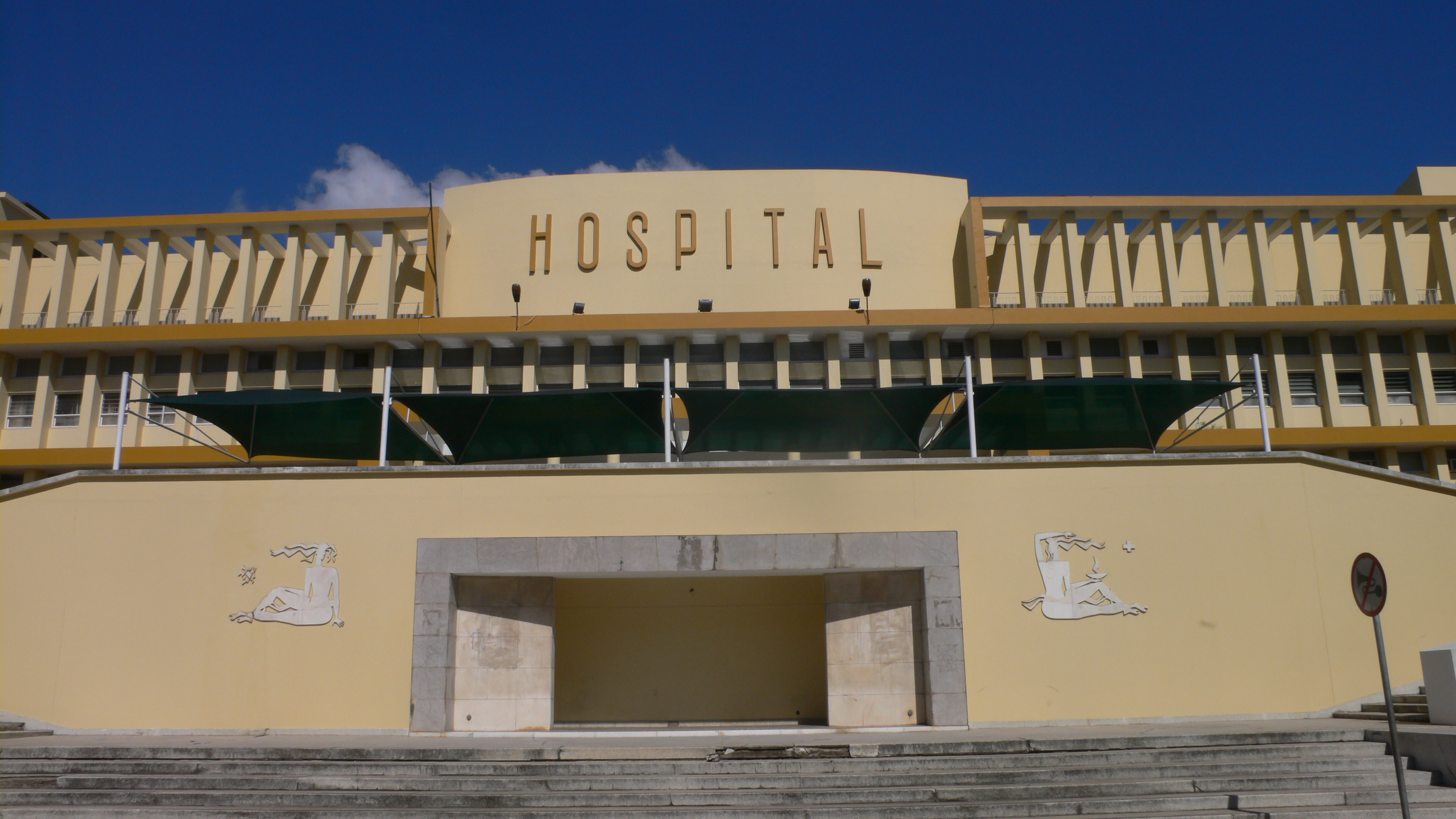
Central Hospital of Maputo

Maputo has several hospitals and clinics, including the city and country's largest hospital, the Hospital Central de Maputo. Other hospitals include the public Hospital Geral José Macamo as well as the private Clinica da Sommerschield, Clínica Cruz Azul, Hospital Privado and Hospital Geral de Mavalane.

The construction of Hospital Miguel Bombarda began in 1900. In 1976, Samora Machel renamed the hospital as Hospital Central de Maputo (HCM). The hospital has 1500 beds for in-patients and has an estimated staff number of 3000. It is made of a multi-block structure with 35 separate buildings spanning an area of 163,800 m^{2}. The hospital has six departments: Medicine, Surgery, Pediatrics, Orthopedics, Gynaecology and Obstetrics. It also has divisions for Ophthalmology and Otolaryngology and a morgue. The hospital provides services for an average 700 out-patients a day and over 1,000 kg (2,205 lb) of washing is done daily. In the early 1990s, a section of the hospital was divided and turned into a private clinic offering higher quality services for those who could afford it called the Clínica Especial de Maputo. The residence for the head of medicine is on the corner of Avenida Eduardo Mondlane and Avenida Salavador Allende. It is a historically valuable structure which was completed in 1908 and has since the 1990s been converted into a charming restaurant with colonial themes called Restaurante 1908. The upper floors are still used by the hospital as offices.

== Notable people ==
- Al Bowlly, singer
- Carlos Cardoso, journalist
- Alberto Chissano, sculptor
- Moreira Chonguica, musician, composer, social activist
- Gilles Cistac, constitutional lawyer
- Mia Couto, writer
- José Craveirinha, poet
- Eusébio, footballer
- Ruth First, South African anti-apartheid activist
- Pancho Guedes, architect
- Teresa Heinz, philanthropist and political figure, widow of John Heinz and wife of American political figure John Kerry
- Josina Z. Machel, women's rights activist
- Lucas Macie, painter
- Malangatana, artist
- Henning Mankell, author, dramatist
- Mariza, fado singer
- Mexer, footballer
- Maria Mutola, runner
- Neyma, singer
- Lucrécia Paco, actress
- Alexandre Quintanilha, scientist
- Ricardo Rangel, photojournalist
- Nelson Saúte, writer and professor
- Laylizzy, hip-hop recording artist, songwriter and performer

== Twin towns – sister cities ==
Maputo is twinned with:

- Addis Ababa, Ethiopia
- Ankara, Turkey
- Bissau, Guinea-Bissau
- Cape Town, South Africa
- Charles County, United States
- Chengdu, China
- Chennai, India
- (Timor-Leste) Dili, East Timor
- Durban, South Africa
- Guarulhos, Brazil
- Harare, Zimbabwe
- Jakarta, Indonesia
- Lagos, Nigeria
- Lisbon, Portugal
- Luanda, Angola
- Mbabane, Eswatini
- Port Louis, Mauritius
- Rio de Janeiro, Brazil
- Shanghai, China

=== Cooperation agreements ===
Maputo also has a cooperation agreement with:

- Barcelona, Spain

== See also ==
- Delagoa Bay
- Lourenço Marques (explorer)
- List of cities in Mozambique by population
- Metropolitan Maputo
