= KaMavota =

- Bairro
- Location within Mozambique
- Coordinates: 25.8872°S 32.6361°E
- Country: Mozambique
- Time zone: UTC+2 (CAT)

KaMavota is a bairro in Maputo, Mozambique.
