= Nlhamankulu =

Coordinates: 25°56′43″S 32°33′26″E

- Bairro
- Interactive map of Nlhamankulu
- Country: Mozambique
- Time zone: UTC+2 (CAT)

Nlhamankulu is one of Bairros in Maputo, Mozambique.
