= Nelson Saúte =

Mozambican writer

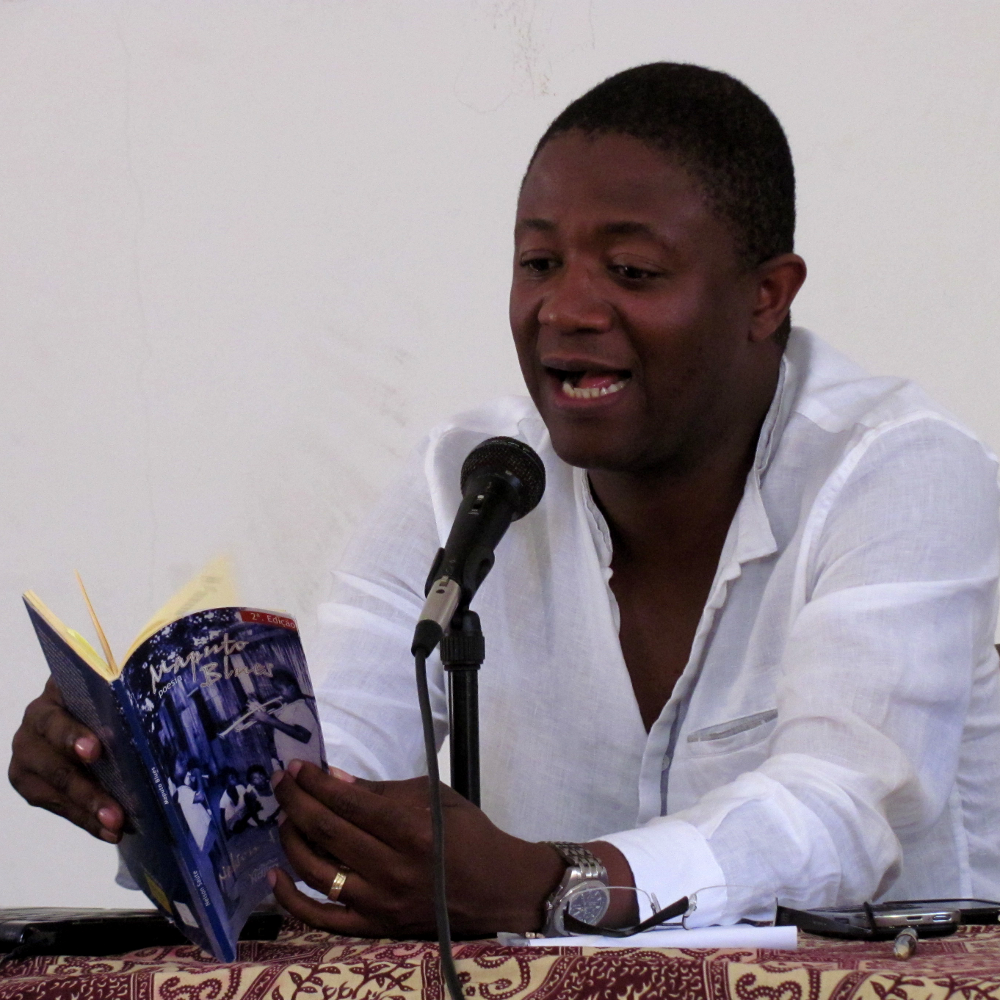
Nelson Saúte, Maputo Blues

Nelson Saúte (Maputo, 26 February 1967) is a writer and Communication Sciences professor from Mozambique.

He studied Communication Sciences at the New University of Lisbon. He has worked for Tempo, Notícias, Rádio Moçambique and Televisão de Moçambique.

== Works ==
- O apóstolo da desgraça. Lisboa, Publicações Dom Quixote, 1996
- Os Narradores da Sobrevivência. Lisboa, Publicações Dom Quixote, 2000

=== Anthologies ===
- Antologia da Nova Poesia Moçambicana: 1975-1988. Fátima Mendonça. Maputo, Associação dos Escritores Moçambicanos, 1989
- A Ilha e Moçambique pela voz dos poetas.António Sopa. Lisboa, Edições 70, 1992.
- As Mãos dos Pretos. Lisboa, Publicações Dom Quixote, 2001
