= KaNyaka =

- Bairro
- Interactive map of KaNyaka
- Coordinates: 26°01′20″S 32°56′15″E
- Country: Mozambique
- Time zone: UTC+2 (CAT)

KaNyaka is a bairro in Maputo, Mozambique.
