= Laylizzy =

Mozambican singer-songwriter and producer

- Born: Edson Abel Jeremias Tchamo; Mozambique
- Genres: hip hop
- Occupations: singer-songwriter; producer
- Instrument: vocals
- Labels: Geobek Records (former); Tha Crew

Edson Abel Jeremias Tchamo, known by his stage name Laylizzy, is a Mozambican hip-hop recording artist, songwriter and performer who raps in Portuguese and English.

== Music career ==
At the age of 14, Laylizzy joined a music group called 360 Graus, with his friends Hernani da Silva and alongside producer, Ellputo. They founded Sameblood Studios.

In 2014, Laylizzy signed to Pan African orientated Geobek Entertainment's record label, Geobek Records. He has since released two singles under the label, "Tha Crew" in July 2015, followed by the single "Hello" featuring AKA which was released on 1 April 2016, charting on iTunes Mozambique as #1 on all genre and #2 on iTunes South Africa Hip-hop chart.

Laylizzy won an award for 'Best Hip Hop Song' at the 2015 Mozambique Music Awards and was the winner of the Newcomers Delight Section in Hip Hop Magazine, HYPE in December 2015.

In March 2016, laylizzy and fellow Mozambican top artists such as G2, Lizha James, Ziqo, Zena Bacar, António Marcos, Cristel, Nelson and Luwi Ace came together to make the 2016 "Vive Agora" campaign song powered by Vodacom Mozambique. In April 2016, Laylizzy became the first Mozambican artist to get verified on instagram and Facebook.

In Oct 2016, CNN African Voices profiled Laylizzy as Mozambique's influential artist pushing the boundaries of hip hop music across borders and an artist who believes in future of Mozambique. SA Hip-Hop Magazine ranks Laylizzy as one of the top 10 rappers in Africa.

== Songs ==
=== As a lead artist ===
Song	Year	Producer(s)
"Tha Crew"	2015	Fly Beatz & Ellputo
"Hello" ft. AKA	2016	Ellputo
"On the Road"	2016	Kc
"Forever"	2017	Kc & Ellputo
"Slay"	2017	Ellputo
"Txi"	2018	Kc & Ellputo
"Too Much" ft. Kwesta	2018	Ceazor & Zuks
