= Katembe =

Katembe Catembe
- Location within Mozambique
- Coordinates: 26°00′18″S 32°33′35″E
- Country: Mozambique
- Elevation: 47 m (154 ft)

Population (2024 Estimate)
  - Total: 30,285
- Time zone: UTC+2 (CAT)
- Area Code & Prefix: (+258) 21-XX-XX-XX
- ISO 3166 code: MZ
- Climate: Aw

Katembe (also spelled Catembe or KaTembe) is a district of the city of Maputo, the capital of Mozambique. Situated on the southern shore of Maputo Bay, it faces the historic downtown area across the water and has traditionally served as a strategic gateway between Maputo and the southern coastal region. The district is connected to Ponta do Ouro, the Maputo Special (Elephant) Reserve, and onward to Durban via the Mozambican EN200 and the South African R22 roads. Katembe is noted for its position within the Tembe-Swazi cultural sphere, its beaches, and its role as the southern anchor of the Maputo–Katembe Bridge, the longest suspension bridge in Africa.

== Etymology ==
The name Katembe derives from the Tembe people, a subgroup of the wider Nguni-speaking communities inhabiting southern Mozambique and parts of Eswatini and KwaZulu-Natal. The Tembe chieftaincy historically controlled the lower Maputo River region, establishing long-standing cultural and political links with the Swazi monarchy and other historical kingdoms in KwaZulu-Natal.

In Swazi cultural practice, Katembe is one of the sites where bemanti ("water people") collect water for the Incwala ceremony, symbolising ancestral connection and territorial continuity.

== History ==
=== Pre-colonial and Tembe Kingdom ===
Prior to Portuguese expansion, the region formed part of the Tembe Kingdom, ruled by Tembe chiefs with influence across Maputo Bay and down the coast toward Saint Lucia Bay in KwaZulu-Natal. The Tembe engaged in trade networks connecting inland Swazi and other Nguni communities with coastal exchange routes.

=== Portuguese period ===
During the 18th and 19th centuries, Katembe developed as a small coastal settlement providing logistical support to Portuguese naval and administrative activities in Lourenço Marques (present-day Maputo). By the mid-20th century, Katembe functioned as a modest ferry-linked suburb providing leisure and residential functions for the metropolitan area.

=== Post-Independence ===
After 1975, Katembe remained relatively underdeveloped compared to central Maputo, limited by its isolation across the bay and reliance on a ferry service. From the early 2000s, national urban development plans identified Katembe as a future expansion zone for Maputo, anticipating new infrastructure capable of supporting planned administrative, residential, and tourism districts.

== Location ==
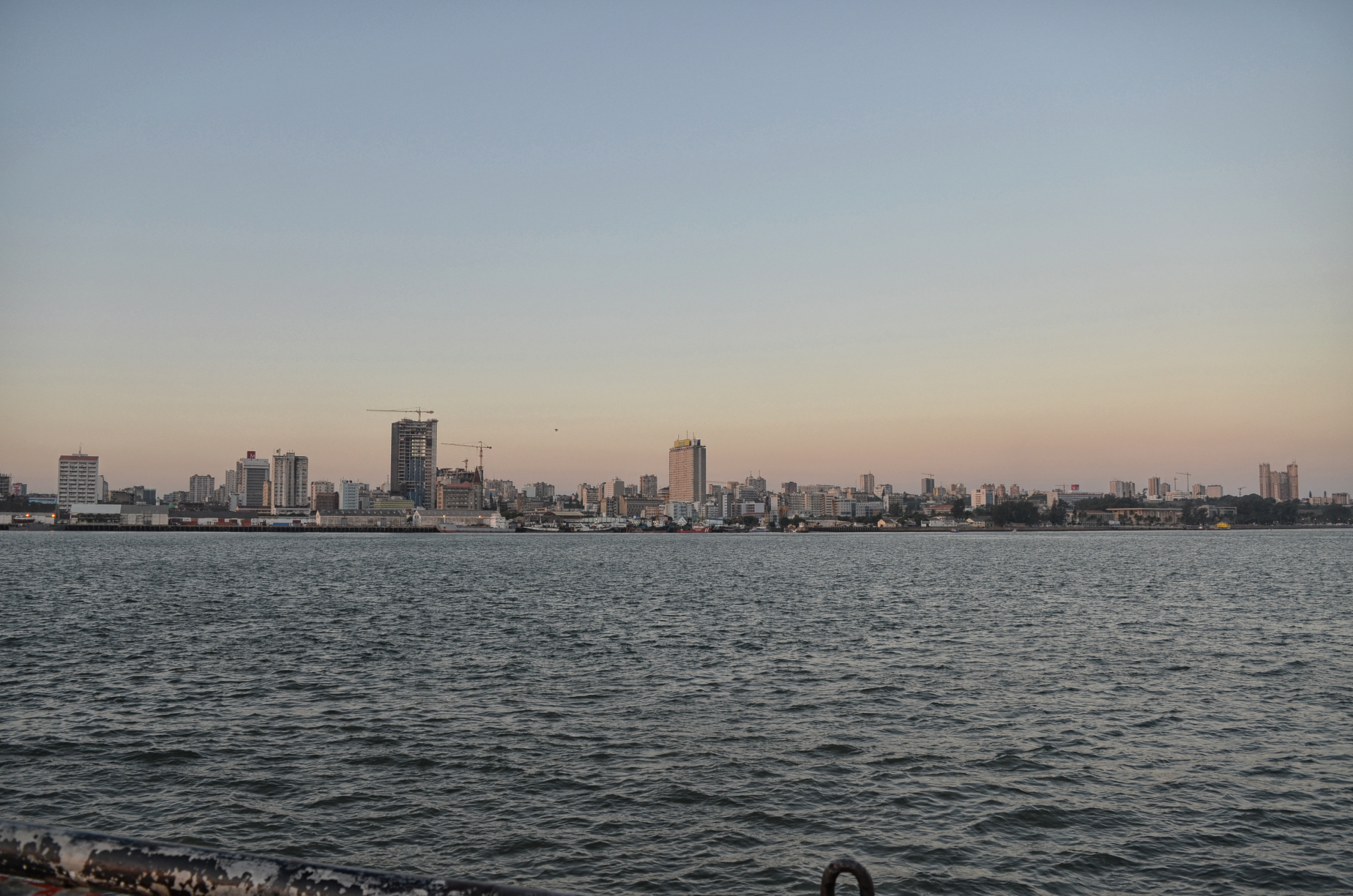
A view of the city of Maputo from Katembe

Katembe is located on the south-western side of Maputo Bay, near the Estuário do Espírito Santo where the rivers Tembe, Mbuluzi, Matola and Infulene converge. The bay is 95 kilometres (59 mi) long and 30 kilometres (19 mi) wide. At the extreme east of Katembe and the bay is the island of Inhaca. Katembe is about 109 kilometres (68 mi) north of Ponta do Ouro, at the border with South Africa.

The district lies about 5 km by road from central Maputo and is connected to the mainland city by the Maputo–Katembe Bridge. The bridge’s 680 m main span makes it the longest suspension structure in Africa. Built between 2014 and 2018 at a total cost of US$785 million, of which 90% was financed by the Export-Import Bank of China, with the Mozambican government founding the remaining 10 percent. GAUFF Engineering, a German consultancy firm based in Nuremberg with an affiliate in Mozambique, was playing a major role in the project as consultant for the contractor and client. The German engineers were responsible for quality control supervision with a QMP (Quality Management Plan) and for the general design check and verification.

The bridge replaced the former 31 km circuitous road route around the bay. Together with the new highway running south, the bridge integrates Katembe into major regional corridors linking Maputo with Ponta do Ouro, KwaZulu-Natal, and the wider Indian Ocean coastline.

Katembe’s geographic position at the junction of river, bay, and ocean environments has historically influenced settlement, transport, and economic activity. Today, its combination of coastal landscapes, open land for urban growth, and proximity to both Maputo’s centre and cross-border routes makes it a focal point for metropolitan expansion plans.

== Transport ==
=== Ferry connection ===
For more than a century, Katembe was connected to central Maputo primarily by a municipal ferry service crossing approximately 5 km of Maputo Bay. The ferry transported passengers, goods, and small vehicles and served as a symbolic and practical bridge between the city and its southern districts. Since the completion of the Maputo-Katembe bridge there remain only small water taxis (referred to as mapapai locally) that regularly transport foot-passengers between the Maputo and Katembe piers. It is the easiest way for people in Katembe to reach the Maputo side and take the daily KaNyaka ferry to Inhaca Island.

=== Maputo–Katembe Bridge ===
The Maputo–Katembe Bridge, inaugurated in 2018, is a 680 m main-span suspension bridge linking downtown Maputo to Katembe. Built with Chinese financing and engineering, it is the longest suspension bridge on the African continent. The project received the Fulton Award in 2017 in the special concrete category, and in 2019 it won the Fulton Award in the ‘Infrastructure projects over 100 million rand’ category from the Concrete Society of Southern Africa.

The bridge forms the first segment of a new highway running to Ponta do Ouro, improving access to South Africa’s KwaZulu-Natal province and creating a strategic route within the Mozambique-South Africa-Eswatini tourism corridor. The creation of this corridor is part of the national development masterplan, which provides for the inception of infrastructures to support tourism and the generation of new jobs, for growth and for the development of the southern region of the Maputo Province.

== Urban development ==
Katembe is the subject of the Katembe City Urban Development Master Plan, a large-scale redevelopment programme prepared with Chinese cooperation in the 2010s. The plan envisions:[11]

- a new central business district
- administrative and governmental precincts
- residential neighbourhoods
- marina and waterfront developments
- improved public infrastructure
- expanded tourism zones

Implementation has been gradual, with land servicing, road networks, and initial residential projects underway. The bridge has positioned Katembe as a primary zone for future metropolitan expansion.

=== Administrative subdivisions ===
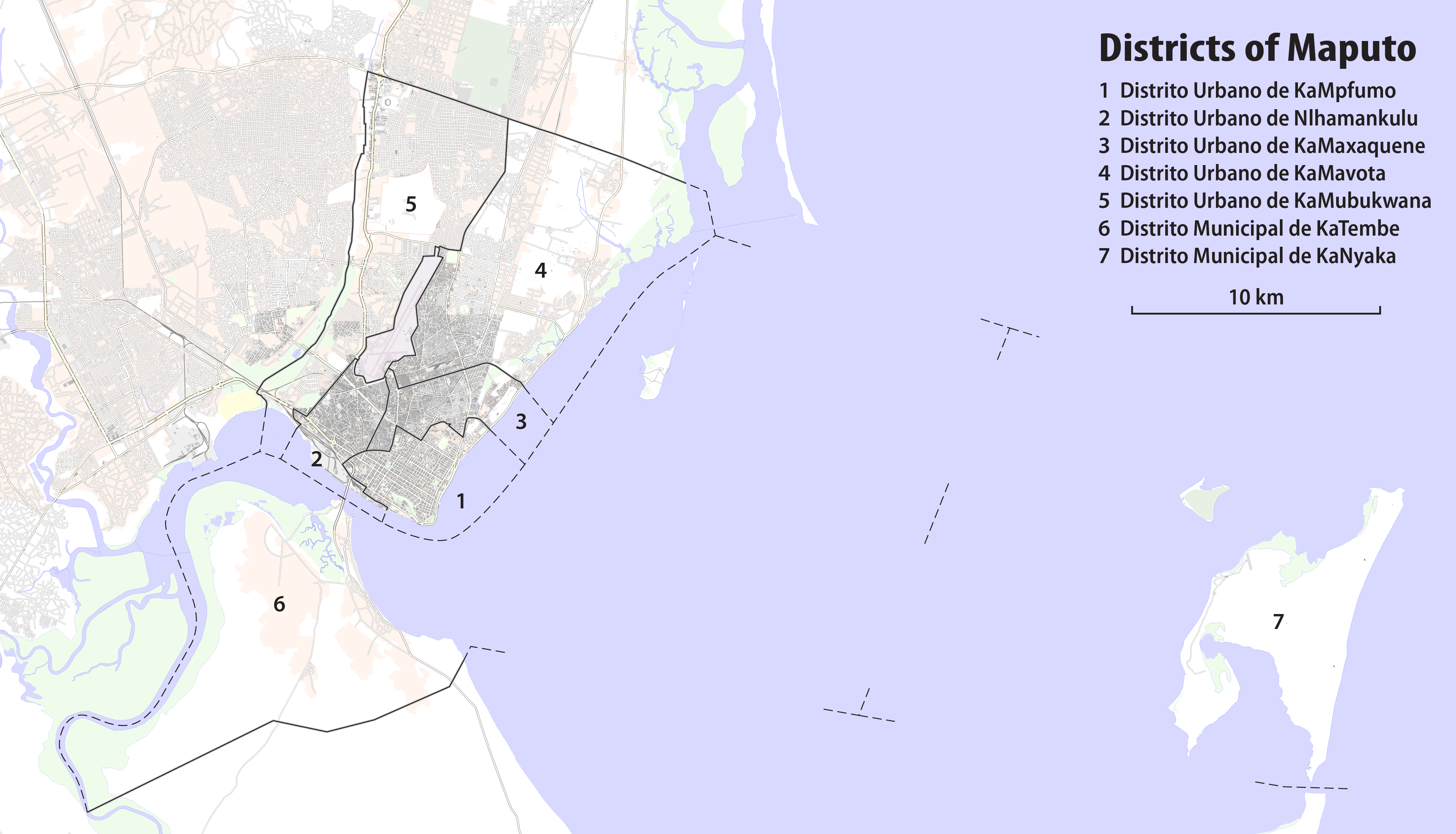
Districts of Maputo

Maputo (of which Katembe is a component), is divided into seven main administrative divisions. Each of these consists of several smaller city quarters or bairros. Katembe is an urban district and is a component of the city of Maputo. Its administrative divisions include Gwachene, Chali, Inguice, Xamissava, and Inkassane.

== Population ==
In 2024, the population of Katembe urban district was estimated at approximately 30,285 people, mainly of the Tembe ethnic lineage, who are closely related to the Swazi royal lineage, the Zulu people and the Tsonga people of Maputaland, in South Africa.

== Culture ==
=== Tembe–Swazi cultural connections ===
Katembe retains cultural ties with the Tembe people and the Swazi monarchy. It is one of the traditional locations associated with the Incwala ceremony, during which emissaries from Eswatini collect water symbolising unity between land and ancestral authority.

=== Local traditions ===
The district is home to artistic and cultural expressions typical of southern Mozambique, including dance, music, wood carving, and community rituals linked to coastal life. Katembe’s cultural identity is shaped by its mixture of Tembe heritage and its proximity to the urban centre of Maputo.

=== Notable people ===
One of the most prominent figures associated with Katembe is the poet Carolina Noémia Abranches de Sousa Soares, known as Noémia de Sousa (1926–2002). Born in Catembe of mixed Portuguese, Bantu and other ancestries, she became a leading voice in Mozambique’s anti-colonial literary movement and is often referred to as the “mother of Mozambican poets”. Her work, written largely in the late 1940s and early 1950s and associated with the Moçambicanidade current, explored themes of African identity, resistance and cultural pride, and has been widely anthologised in Lusophone and African literary collections.

== Tourism ==
Katembe is known for its beaches, informal seafood restaurants, views over the Maputo skyline, and access to southern coastal areas. Tourist activity has increased since the opening of the Maputo–Katembe Bridge, which has significantly reduced travel times to Ponta do Ouro and nearby marine reserves.

Accommodation in the district includes small lodges, guesthouses, and hotels, such as the Catembe Gallery Hotel, a four-star establishment known for integrating Mozambican and regional art in its design. Tourism remains a developing sector reliant on continued urban expansion and infrastructure upgrades.

== See also ==
- Maputo
- Maputo-Katembe bridge
- Tembe people
- Eswatini Incwala ceremony
- Ponta do Ouro Partial Marine Reserve
- Delagoa Bay
- List of cities in Mozambique by population
