= Ponta do Ouro =

Town in Maputo Province, Mozambique

- Town
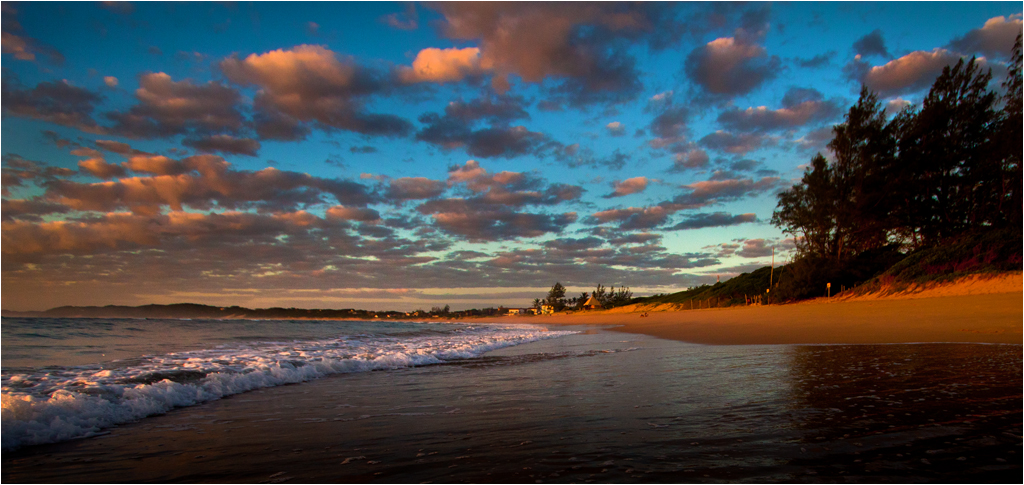
- Ponta do Ouro
- Etymology: Portuguese for "tip of gold"
- Location within Mozambique
- Coordinates: 26.849°S 32.888°E
- Country: Mozambique
- Province: Maputo
- Time zone: UTC+2:00 (CAT)

Ponta do Ouro (also Ponta d'Ouro) is a coastal town in Matutuíne District, Maputo Province, in the far south of Mozambique. It lies on the Indian Ocean coast just north of the border with the South African province of KwaZulu-Natal, and is the southernmost settlement on the Mozambican coast. The town is known for its beaches, resident dolphin population, scuba diving and deep-sea fishing, and is a popular holiday destination for visitors from South Africa, who commonly refer to it simply as "Ponta". The waters off Ponta do Ouro form part of Maputo National Park, which was inscribed on the UNESCO World Heritage List in 2025 as an extension of South Africa's iSimangaliso Wetland Park.

== Etymology ==
The name is Portuguese for "tip of gold" or "point of gold", and refers to the headland at the southern end of the town's beach.

== Geography ==
Ponta do Ouro sits at the southern end of a stretch of coastline characterised by long sandy beaches backed by vegetated dunes. A string of smaller coastal settlements lies to the north, including Ponta Malongane and Ponta Mamoli. The town marks the southern limit of Maputo National Park's marine component, which extends north along the coast to the mouth of the Maputo River and includes the waters around Inhaca Island.

== Conservation ==
=== Ponta do Ouro Partial Marine Reserve ===
The Mozambican government included the waters off Ponta do Ouro on its tentative list of World Heritage Sites in August 2008, and the Ponta do Ouro Partial Marine Reserve was proclaimed in 2009. Its declaration, supported by the Peace Parks Foundation, created Africa's first marine transfrontier conservation area, linking the reserve with iSimangaliso Wetland Park across the border in South Africa. The combined marine protected area is known as the Ponta do Ouro–Kosi Bay Transfrontier Conservation Area.

=== Maputo National Park ===
On 7 December 2021 the marine reserve was merged with the neighbouring Maputo Special Reserve to form Maputo National Park. The park covers about 1,718 square kilometres (663 sq mi), of which 678 square kilometres (262 sq mi) is marine, extending three nautical miles offshore. On 13 July 2025, at its 47th session in Paris, the UNESCO World Heritage Committee approved the park's inscription as a transboundary extension of iSimangaliso Wetland Park, making it Mozambique's second World Heritage Site.

== Marine life and dolphin tourism ==
The bay at Ponta do Ouro is home to a small resident population of Indo-Pacific bottlenose dolphins (Tursiops aduncus), estimated from photo-identification data at around 300 individuals. Commercial swim-with-dolphins tours have operated in the bay since 1994, and Ponta do Ouro is the main centre of the activity in Mozambique; no regulations governed the industry until 2010. A study of the population between 2007 and 2019 found that dolphins were more likely to travel, and less likely to rest, socialise or forage, after tourist swims, and recommended time and area closures, speed restrictions and mandatory training for tour staff.

The wider park supports a range of other marine species, including sea turtles, which are monitored along the coast north of the town.

== Tourism ==
Tourism is the mainstay of the local economy. The town's beach, dive sites, deep-sea fishing and dolphin encounters draw large numbers of visitors, particularly from South Africa. Accommodation ranges from beachfront resorts to campsites and self-catering chalets.

== Transport ==
Ponta do Ouro lies close to the Kosi Bay–Ponta do Ouro border crossing between Mozambique and South Africa. Until the late 2010s the road from Maputo was largely unpaved sand, passable only by four-wheel drive vehicles and liable to become impassable in the rainy season. In November 2018 the Maputo–Katembe bridge opened across Maputo Bay, together with a new tarred road running south from Katembe to Ponta do Ouro and the border. KwaZulu-Natal's transport department said at the opening that the route would cut the journey between Maputo and the Kosi Bay border post from six hours to about 90 minutes.

== See also ==
- Maputo National Park
- iSimangaliso Wetland Park
- Kosi Bay
- Lubombo Transfrontier Conservation Area
