= C. calamus =

C. calamus may refer to:

- Calamus calamus, the saucereye porgy, a fish species
- Cirrhimuraena calamus, an eel species

== See also ==
- Calamus (disambiguation)
