= Machangulo affair =

2009 Netherlands controversy

The Machangulo Affair was a social and (eventually) political controversy that took place in the Netherlands in 2009. It involved a decision in 2007 by Dutch crown prince Willem-Alexander and his wife princess Máxima to invest in a land development project in Machangulo (in Mozambique). It ended on November 20, 2009, with the decision to sell the property.

== Background ==
On 10 July 2008, the Prince and Princess announced that they had – in the second half of 2007 – invested in a development project on the Mozambican peninsula of Machangulo. The development project in question was aimed at building an ecologically responsible vacation resort, including a hotel and several luxury vacation houses for investors. In addition the project was to invest heavily in the local economy of the peninsula (building schools, wells and housing for the local populace) with an eye both towards "responsible sustainability" and maintaining a local staff.

The royal couple stated that they had been attracted to the project since it seemed to be a perfect match for their desires and interests: on the one hand a vacation resort far away, where they might take holidays without too many prying eyes; and on the other ecologically and sustainably responsible, investing in the local economy and ecology (which the Prince and Princess both have a personal interest in). Plus located in Africa, a continent that has been dear to several generations of the royal family. So, after contacting Mozambican president Armando Guebuza to verify that the Mozambican government had no objections, the couple decided to invest.

== Controversy ==
The announcement of the investment was initially not considered anything special in the Netherlands and was generally considered to be "information". However, in the course of 2009 there was quite a bit of controversy surrounding the project and the Prince's position in relation to it. There were reports in the press of corruption involving a contractor in the project, who turned out to have embezzled money from a number of investors (not the Prince, however). A local police chief was arrested for having murdered a local who was protesting the project. And shortly after that a report was published stating that there had been serious delays in building facilities for the local population (those facilities have been completed since). Also, there were questions about some of the investors (particularly members of the Flick family) and whether it was such a wonderful idea for the Prince to be neighbors with them.

Towards November 2009 the rumors and speculation intensified, although there were also opinions issued in favor of the purchase. On top of corruption charges and project delays, there were rumors about the local population losing fishing grounds due to the closing of a 20 kilometer stretch of beach for private use of the resort and a protest by the local population being put down by the army, using gunfire (both rumors were later denied, the latter one by Dutch prime minister Jan Peter Balkenende).

In the course of 2009 there were several scandals and semi-scandals involving the royal couple (including a lawsuit against the Associated Press), as well as other members of the royal house. Several of these involved family finances (general expenses of the royal house, tax shelters being run from the Palace, travel expenses, use of a naval shipyard for the work on the Queen's personal yacht). These rumors came at a time in which the Netherlands was starting to feel the effects of the late-2000s recession and negatively impacted the royal families popularity. This general downturn in popular support for the royals may have fed the political criticism that followed.

In November 2009 politicians such as Alexander Pechtold had started simply questioning the morality of building a luxury resort in a poor country such as Mozambique. And there were questions about the Prince's behavior on rumors that he had "wined until he had gotten his way" and that he had "pushed ahead on the project without consulting the prime minister". These rumors were always attributed to an "anonymous source near the government", so their reliability is unclear; however, the unquestioning way they were accepted by a relatively large section of the public says something about the mood in the Netherlands towards the end of 2009.

Finally, in November, there were a number of parliamentary debates on the issue and prime minister Balkenende was even called to answer questions. In these questions he explained that the project was a private affair of the Prince, but that extra distance had been created between the Prince and the business of the project to avoid entanglements. The extra distance came in the form of a foundation that managed the Prince's investment. The press called the independence of that foundation into question however, because it was run by a personal friend of the Prince's.

Finally, on November 20, the prime minister returned to parliament to announce that the Prince and Princess had decided, due to the public and parliamentary controversy, to sell the property in Machangulo once their house was completed. To this end he read a letter in parliament written by the Prince personally (an unusual event, since ministerial responsibility dictates that royals are usually not quoted directly in parliament).

In January 2012, it was confirmed that the villa had been sold back to Machangulo SA. Prime Minister Mark Rutte stated that the Crown Prince and Princess have no further involvement with the project.
