= Inhaca Airport =

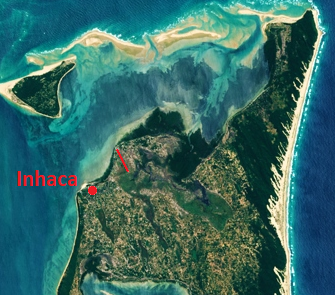
- Inhaca and the runway highlighted in red
- IATA: IHC; ICAO: FQIA

Summary
- Airport type: Public
- Serves: Inhaca, Mozambique
- Elevation AMSL: 8 ft / 2 m
- Coordinates: 25°59′52″S 032°55′45″E

Map
- Location of airport in Mozambique

Runways
Direction	Length		Surface
Direction	m	ft	Surface
18/36	650	2,133	Asphalt
10/28	650	2,133	Grass
- Source: Google Maps

Inhaca Airport (IATA: IHC, ICAO: FQIA) is an airport near Inhaca, a town on Inhaca Island, in the Maputo Province in Mozambique. It is located across Maputo Bay from the country's capital city of Maputo.

== Facilities ==
The airport resides at an elevation of 8 feet (2 m) above mean sea level. It has one runway which is 650 metres (2,133 ft) in length.
