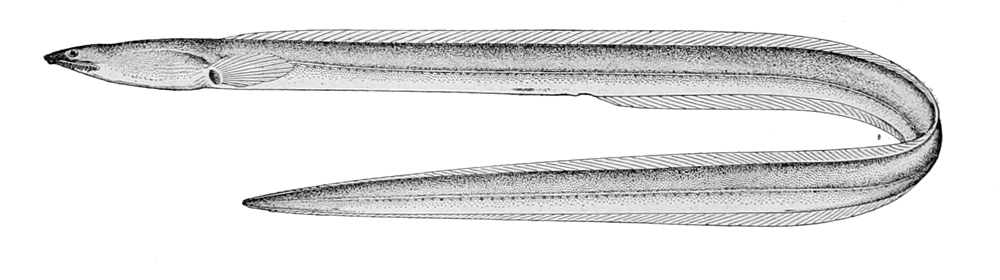
- Cirrhimuraena tapeinoptera

Conservation status
- Data Deficient (IUCN 3.1)

Scientific classification
- Kingdom: Animalia
- Phylum: Chordata
- Class: Actinopterygii
- Order: Anguilliformes
- Family: Ophichthidae
- Genus: Cirrhimuraena
- Species: C. tapeinoptera

Binomial name
- Cirrhimuraena tapeinoptera Bleeker, 1863

Synonyms
- Cirrhimuraena tapeinopterus Bleeker, 1863; Jenkinsiella nectura Jordan, 1907

= Cirrhimuraena tapeinoptera =

Species of fish

Cirrhimuraena tapeinoptera is an eel in the family Ophichthidae (worm/snake eels). It was described by Pieter Bleeker in 1863. It is a tropical, marine eel which is known from the Indo-West Pacific.
