= Cirrhimuraena cheilopogon =

Conservation status
- Data Deficient (IUCN 3.1)

Scientific classification
- Kingdom: Animalia
- Phylum: Chordata
- Class: Actinopterygii
- Order: Anguilliformes
- Family: Ophichthidae
- Genus: Cirrhimuraena
- Species: C. cheilopogon

Binomial name
- Cirrhimuraena cheilopogon (Bleeker, 1860)

Synonyms
- Ophisurus cheilopogon Bleeker, 1860; Cirrhimuraena chilopogon (Bleeker, 1860)

Species of fish

Cirrhimuraena cheilopogon is an eel in the family Ophichthidae (worm/snake eels). It was described by Pieter Bleeker in 1860. It is a tropical, marine eel which is known from Papua New Guinea, in the western central Pacific Ocean.
