= Maputo–Katembe bridge =

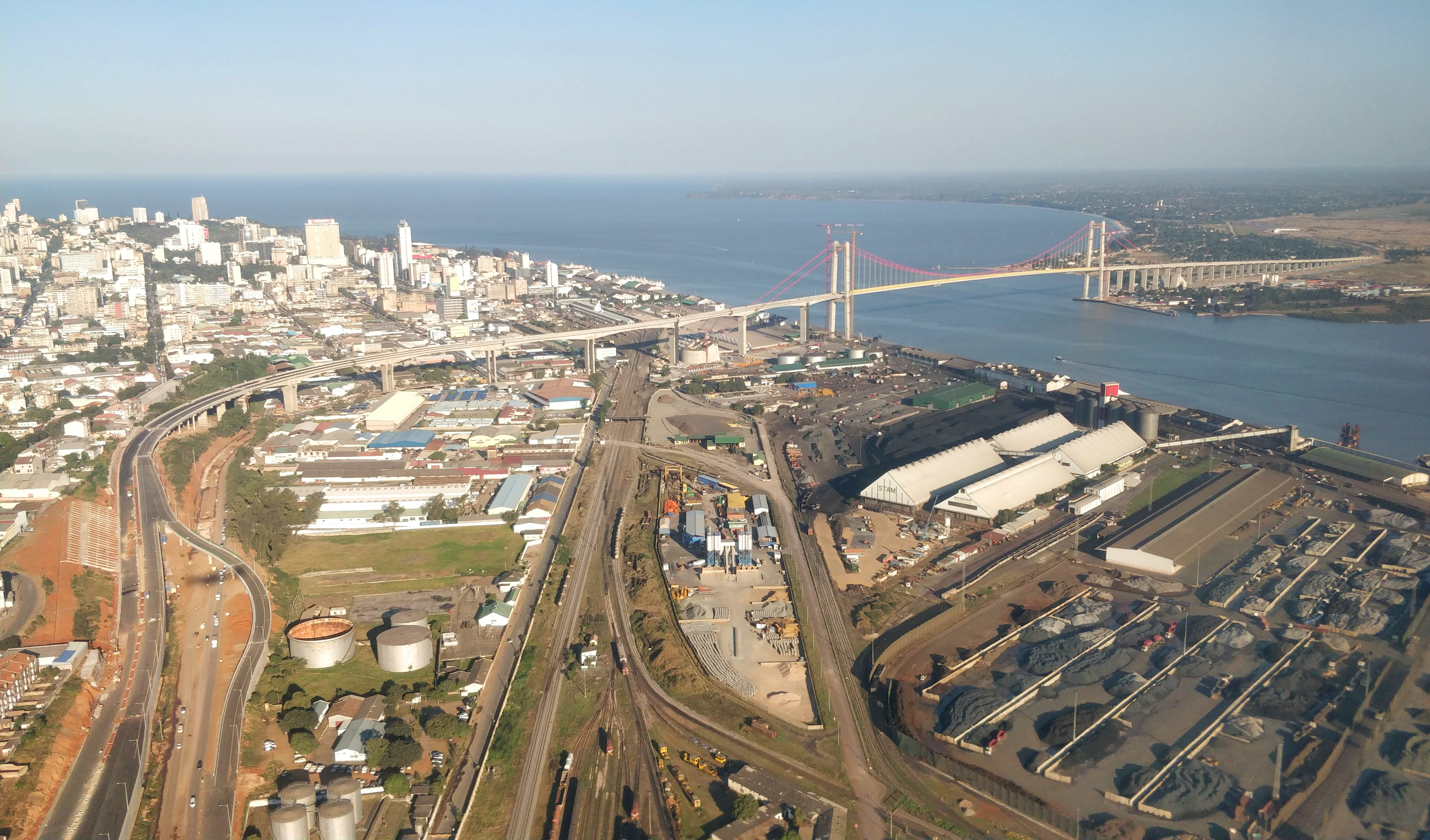
- The Maputo–Katembe bridge as seen from the bay's northern shore
- Coordinates: 25°58′23″S 32°33′27″E
- Crosses: Maputo Bay, Mozambique
- Locale: Maputo Bay, Mozambique

Characteristics
- Design: Suspension Bridge
- Total length: 3,041 metres (9,977 ft)

History
- Construction start: 2014
- Opened: 2018; 8 years ago

Location
- Interactive map of Maputo–Katembe bridge

The Maputo–Katembe bridge (Ponte de Maputo a Katembe) is a suspension bridge across Maputo Bay in southern Mozambique. The bridge connects the Mozambican capital Maputo, on the northern bank, with its disjunct suburb of Katembe on the southern bank. Construction work began in 2014 and the bridge officially opened 10 November 2018. The construction work was carried out by the Chinese China Road and Bridge Corporation; a large part of the project is financed by loans from the Chinese Exim Bank.

The bridge is the longest suspension bridge on the African continent, replacing the Matadi Bridge, completed in 1983 in the Democratic Republic of Congo, for this distinction.

== History ==
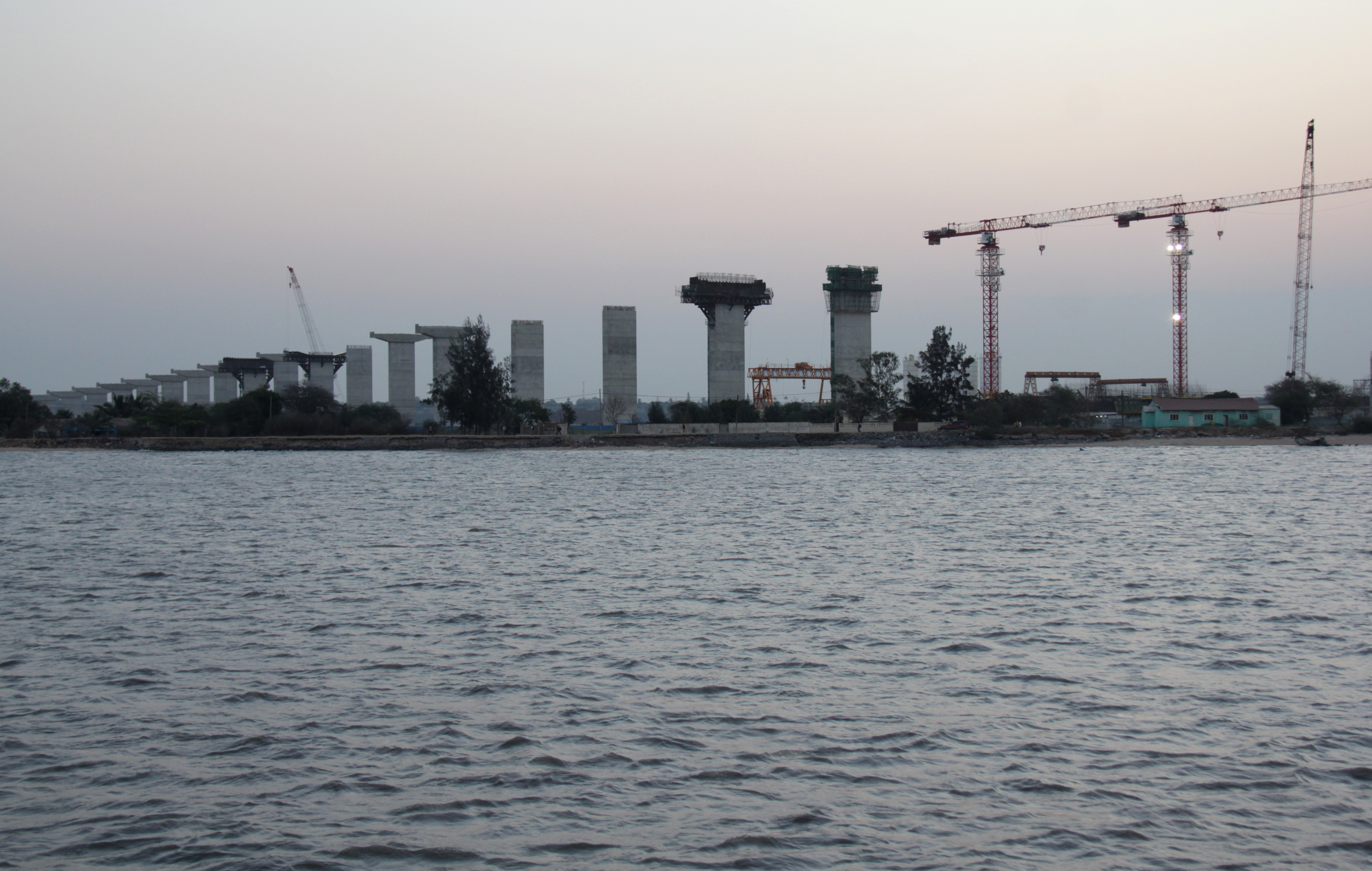
Completed bridge piers of the bridge under construction between Maputo and Katembe (view of the southern bank of Katembe; September 2016)

The idea of a bridge over the Bay of Maputo – analogous to 25 Abril bridge over the Tagus in Lisbon – had already been planned for many years. In 1989, the World Bank financed the urbanisation plan for Maputo, which included the construction of a bridge.

It was only thanks to the end of the civil war, the numerous investments in the course of the gas and oil boom and the associated strong economic upturn in Mozambique that the Mozambican government was able to tackle the project. The government opened an expression of interest procedure in November 2008.

Following a visit by the then Portuguese Prime Minister José Sócrates in 2010, financing by the Portuguese state was originally planned. However, due to the country's massive financial and budgetary crisis, the commitment could not be fulfilled. After a visit by Mozambican President Armando Guebuza to the People's Republic of China in August 2011, both countries agreed on financing of the project by China.

The construction work is being commissioned by the state-owned development company Maputo Sul, which is also responsible for the construction of the ring road. The construction itself will be carried out by the Chinese building and civil engineering group China Road and Bridge Corporation. According to China Daily, up to 2000 jobs are to be created. The German engineering company GAUFF Engineering advises on construction supervision.

The first preparatory construction work began in June 2014 After some delays – especially in the resettlement of residents in the Maputo neighborhood of Malanga – the bridge was inaugurated on 2018-11-15.

== Description of the construction ==
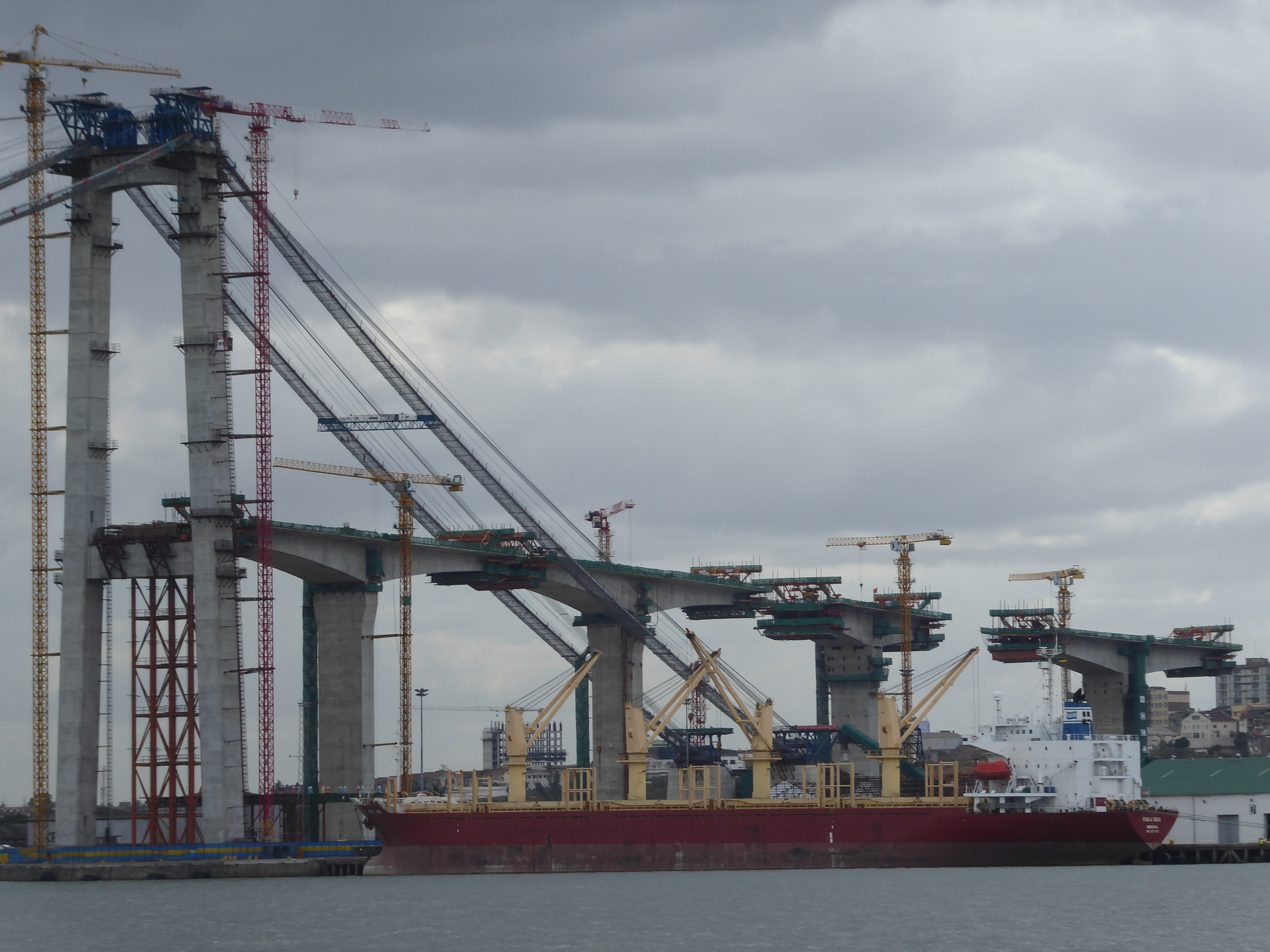
Construction work on the northern part of the bridge (September 2017)

The four-lane suspension bridge is 3041 metres long and crosses the bay at a height of 60 metres. The northern viaduct (foreland bridge) is 1097 meters long, approximately S-shaped and is connected to the Praça 16 de Junho roundabout (connected to the EN1/EN2/EN4 highways) in the Maputo neighborhood of Malanga. The southern viaduct is 1264 meters long and consists of precast elements. It is directly connected to the road to Ponta do Ouro.

Originally, pylons were also planned in the bay itself, but they were removed after a change of plan so as not to unnecessarily obstruct shipping traffic. A span of 680 metres is bridged without pillars between the two pylons located on the banks. This makes the bridge the largest of its kind in Africa. The main supporting cables are each connected to a solid anchor block via steel structures in the north and south. The extremely high loads of the structure required pile foundations with diameters of 1.50 m to 2.20 m. The piles reach 110 m deep into the claystone. The two pylons are 141 m high, and at a height of about 40 meters there is a crossbar for the roadway. The individual prefabricated steel elements for the carriageway are 25.60 m wide and 12 m long. These were fabricated in China and installed from a ship lying near the quay wall.

The project also included the extension of the road from Katembe to the border town of Ponta do Ouro (129 kilometres) and between Boane and Bela Vista (63 kilometres), including bridges over the Maputo, Futi and Umbelúzi rivers. After completing the bridge, extending the EN1 trunk road over the bridge to [Ponta do Ouro] was possible.

== Costs ==
The costs are expected to amount to about 726 million US dollars, of which 85 percent (681.6 million US dollars) will be financed by special loans from the Chinese Exim Bank. These have a term of 20 years at an interest rate of four percent. Another 10 percent (US$72.5 million) will be awarded on other terms via the Exim Bank, 5 percent will be borne directly by the Mozambican state.

== Impact ==
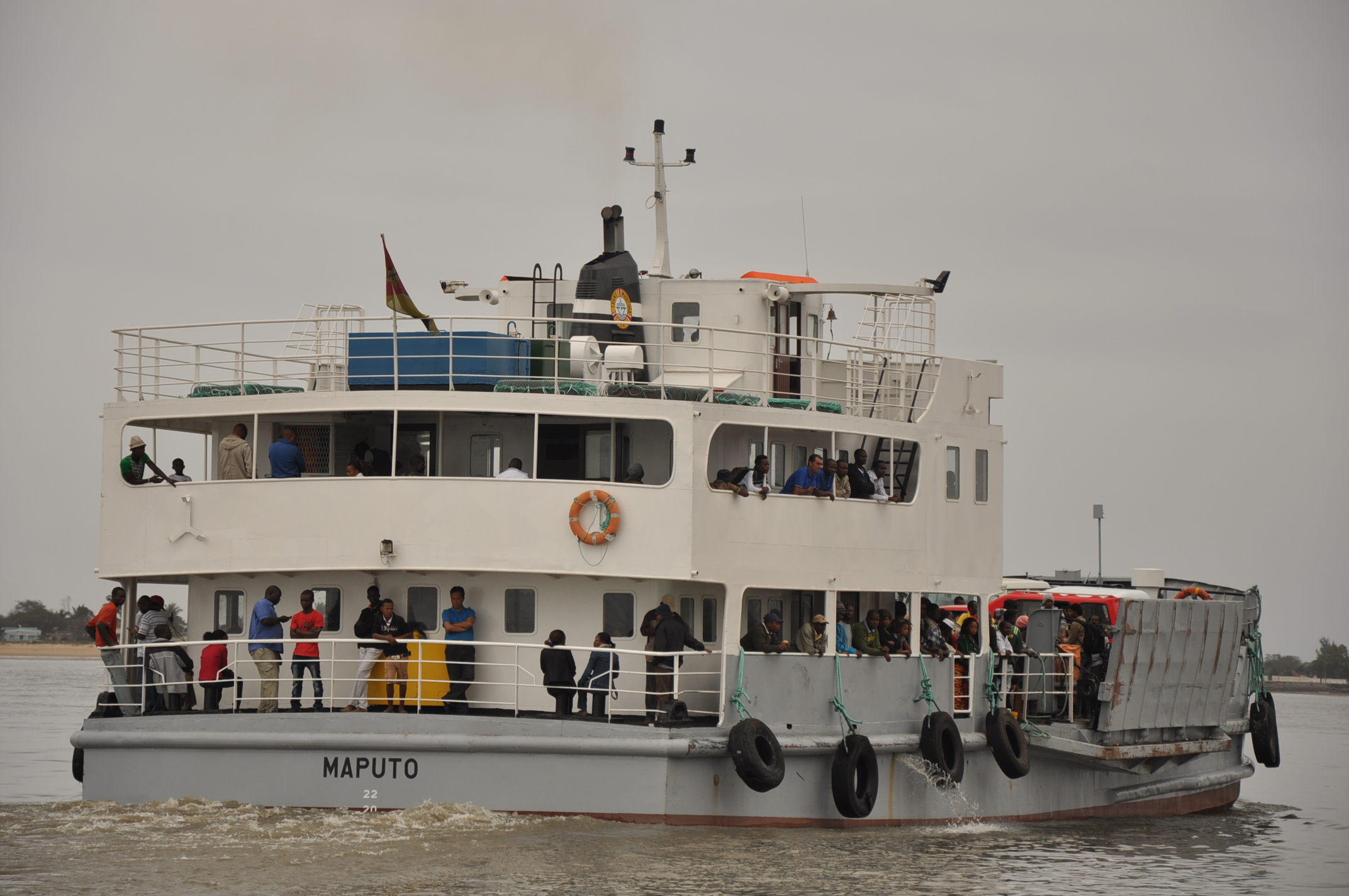
Previously, the direct (and fastest) connection was the ferry of the state shipping company Transmarítimo

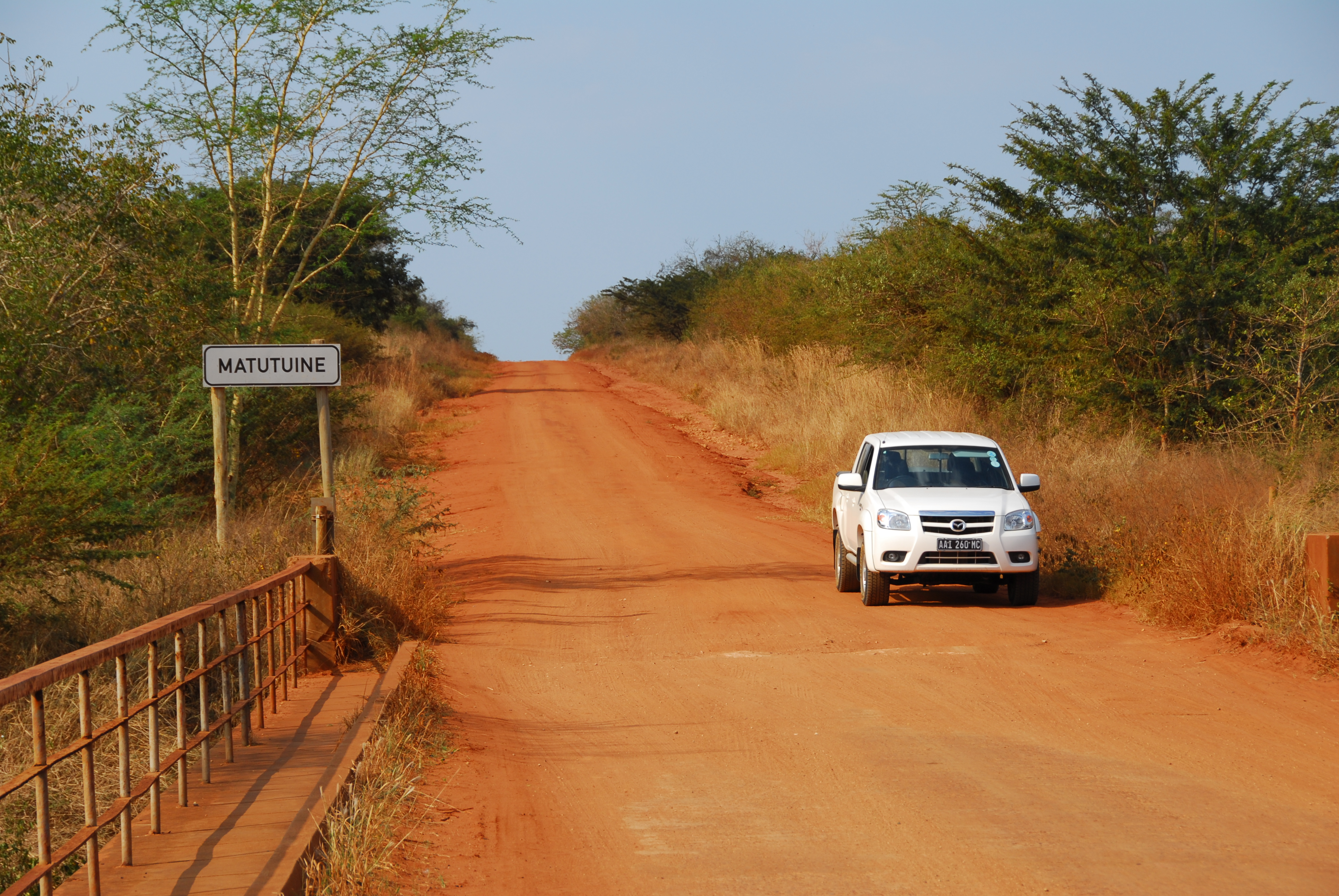
Previously, the road between Katembe and Boane to Ponta do Ouro was not asphalted, and could become impassable, especially in the rainy season.

Although Katembe belongs to the city of Maputo, the spatial separation of the two parts has an immense impact. While Maputo, especially the city centre, is heavily urbanised and has a good two million inhabitants on the north bank of the city, most of the buildings on the south side are one-storeyed, the roads are unpaved and there is a lot of undeveloped space. An estimated 15,000 to 20,000 people currently live in Katembe. The transport takes place between both shores either by car and passenger ferry or via another detour via Boane (main roads EN2/EN200).

With the completion of the bridge and the extension of the road to Ponta do Ouro, a massive population growth of up to 400,000 inhabitants is forecasted for Katembe. The entire southern shore is also to be urbanised. According to the strategic plan for the urbanization of Katembe by the engineering office Betar, approximately 9,510,000 square meters (and thus 58.9 percent of the total area) are to be reserved for residential buildings. 3,270,000 square meters (20.3 percent of the total area) are earmarked for the service sector, 1,880,000 square meters (11.7 percent) for industry.

The extension of the road to Ponta do Ouro and KwaZulu-Natal (South Africa) is intended to massively shorten the travel time. A joint tourism plan with the South African province of KwaZulu-Natal and the Kingdom of Eswatini aims to attract more visitors to southern Mozambique.

== Criticism ==
The high costs of building the bridge and the connected road to Boane and Ponta do Ouro have been massively criticised by Mozambican publicist Carlos Nuno Castel-Branco. In his opinion, the bridge would cost a seventh of the money if it were built in China. Former mayor of Maputo, Eneas Comiche, also criticizes the high costs. Scientist Américo Matavele pointed out that Castel-Branco did not take into account the costs of the connected roads in his invoices.

According to an analysis report by the Economist Intelligence Unit, an analysis company of The Economist Group, interest rates on the loans of the Chinese Exim Bank are also relatively high. The Mozambican government prefers these, although it has far more favourable financing options at its disposal. The criticism of the bridge construction project is illustrated.

In early November 2014, numerous Mozambican workers went on strike for several days. They complained about poor working conditions, wrong contracts and late salary payments.

Furthermore, numerous families are affected by resettlements in the course of the construction project. The contractor Maputo Sul estimates the number of families to be relocated at 920, for which new four-storey houses with two to four-room apartments are to be built as a replacement. Resettlements began in 2015.

== Awards ==
The bridge has received worldwide attention and recognition in specialist circles. In addition to the FULTON Award 2017 and 2019 - the highest distinction for concrete structures in the southern states of Africa - in June 2019 in New York the bridge was also awarded the "Award of Merit" of the Engineering News-Record (ENR) as winner in the category "Global Best Projects".
