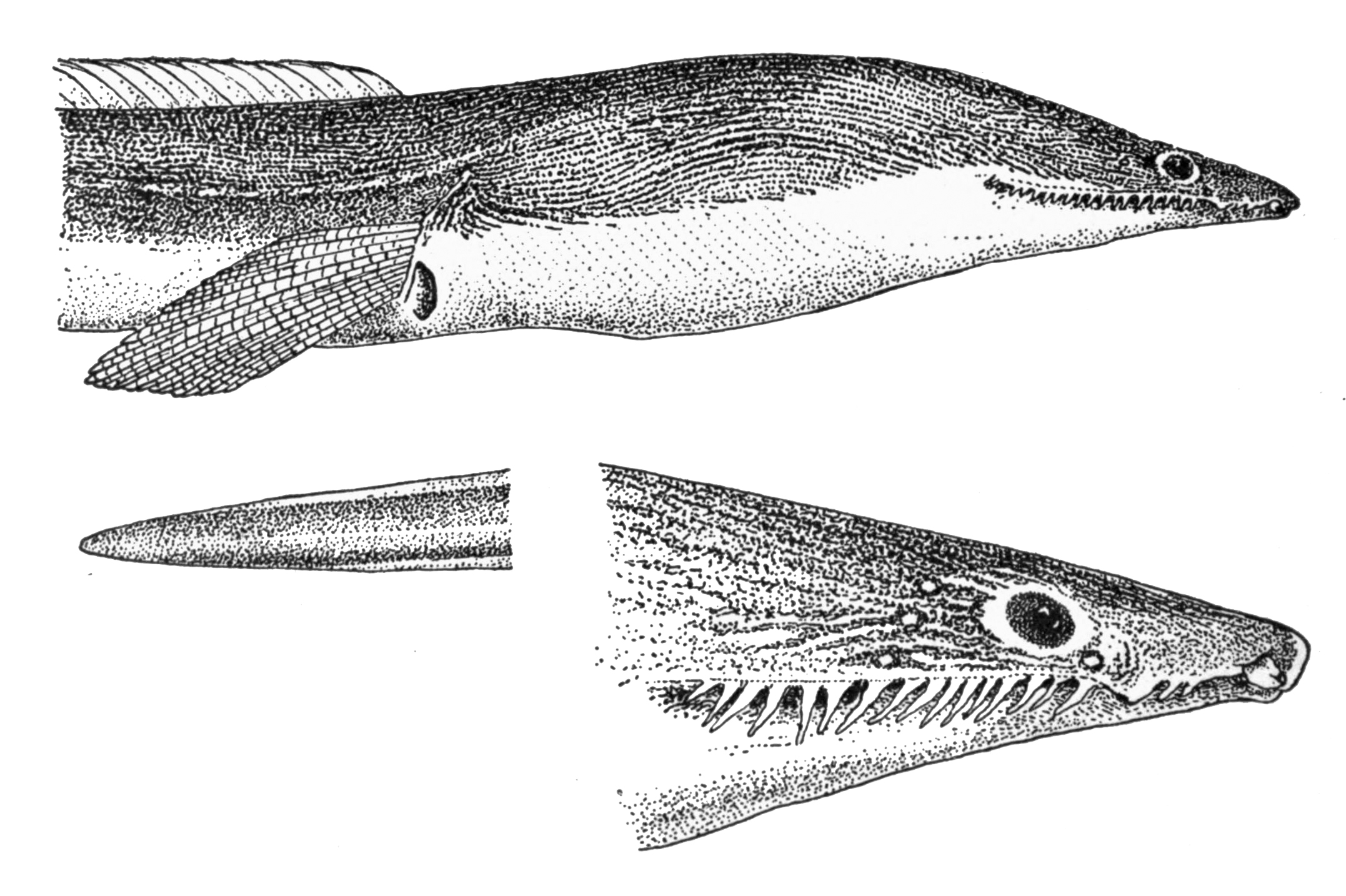

Scientific classification
- Domain: Eukaryota
- Kingdom: Animalia
- Phylum: Chordata
- Class: Actinopterygii
- Order: Anguilliformes
- Family: Ophichthidae
- Subfamily: Ophichthinae
- Genus: Cirrhimuraena; Kaup, 1856

Type species
- Cirrhimuraena chinensis Kaup, 1856

Species
- See text

Synonyms
- Calamuraena Whitley, 1944; Jenkinsiella D. S. Jordan & Evermann, 1905

= Cirrhimuraena =

Genus of fishes

Cirrhimuraena is a genus of eels in the snake eel family Ophichthidae.

== Species ==
There are currently 12 recognized species in this genus:

- Cirrhimuraena calamus (Günther, 1870)
- Cirrhimuraena cheilopogon (Bleeker, 1860)
- Cirrhimuraena chinensis Kaup, 1856
- Cirrhimuraena indica Mohapatra, Mohanty, Ray, Mishra & Seth, 2021
- Cirrhimuraena inhacae (J. L. B. Smith, 1962) (Inhaca fringelip)
- Cirrhimuraena oliveri (Seale, 1910)
- Cirrhimuraena odishaensis Mohanty, Behera, Patro & Mohapatra, 2023
- Cirrhimuraena orientalis K. H. Nguyen, 1993
- Cirrhimuraena paucidens Herre & G. S. Myers, 1931
- Cirrhimuraena playfairii (Günther, 1870) (Fringelip snake-eel)
- Cirrhimuraena tapeinoptera Bleeker, 1863
- Cirrhimuraena yuanding W. Q. Tang & C. G. Zhang, 2003
