= Cirrhimuraena oliveri =

Conservation status
- Data Deficient (IUCN 3.1)

Scientific classification
- Kingdom: Animalia
- Phylum: Chordata
- Class: Actinopterygii
- Order: Anguilliformes
- Family: Ophichthidae
- Genus: Cirrhimuraena
- Species: C. oliveri

Binomial name
- Cirrhimuraena oliveri (Seale, 1910)

Synonyms
- Jenkinsella oliveri Seale, 1910; Jenkinsiella oliveri Seale, 1910

Species of fish

Cirrhimuraena oliveri is a tropical marine eel in the family Ophichthidae (worm/snake eels). It was described by Alvin Seale in 1910, and is known from the Philippines, in the western central Pacific Ocean.
