= Inhaca fringelip =

Conservation status
- Data Deficient (IUCN 3.1)

Scientific classification
- Kingdom: Animalia
- Phylum: Chordata
- Class: Actinopterygii
- Order: Anguilliformes
- Family: Ophichthidae
- Genus: Cirrhimuraena
- Species: C. inhacae

Binomial name
- Cirrhimuraena inhacae (J. L. B. Smith, 1962)

Synonyms
- Jenkinsiella inhacae J. L. B. Smith, 1962

Species of fish

The Inhaca fringelip (Cirrhimuraena inhacae) is an eel in the family Ophichthidae (worm/snake eels). It was described by J. L. B. Smith in 1962. It is a marine, tropical eel which is known from the western Indian Ocean, including Inhaca Island, Mozambique and Madagascar. Males can reach a maximum total length of 23 centimetres (9.1 in).
