= Maputo National Park =

Nature reserve in Mozambique

- Interactive map of Maputo National Park
- Location: Mozambique
- Coordinates: 26.5°S 32.8°E
- Created: 2021

Maputo National Park is a national park in Mozambique, located on Maputo Bay, approximately 100 kilometers southeast of the city of Maputo. With an area of 1,718 km^{2} (663 square miles), it is part of Matutuíne District of the Maputo Province, and also of the Inhaca Island of the city of Maputo.

== History ==
The park was created on 7 December 2021, by the merger of two pre-existing conservation areas: the Maputo Special Reserve (1,040 km^{2} (400 square miles)) and the Ponta do Ouro Partial Marine Reserve (678 km^{2} (262 square miles)). The Maputo Special Reserve (before 1969 known as Maputo Elephant Reserve) was originally proclaimed in 1932 as the Maputo Elephant Reserve to protect a small population of coastal elephants resident in the area. The park was devastated by the Mozambican Civil War, which decimated its animal population. In 2006, the government signed a memorandum of understanding with the South Africa-based conservation group Peace Parks Foundation to rehabilitate the park, resulting in the reintroduction of multiple species beginning in 2010.

The Ponta do Ouro Partial Marine Reserve was established in 2009 to protect the coastal ecosystem of the southernmost region of Mozambique.

== Ecology ==
The park combines lakes, wetlands, swamp forests, grasslands and mangrove forests with a coastline that lies within the Maputaland Centre of Endemism.

=== Fauna ===
During the Mozambican Civil War, most of the large mammals were extirpated from the park. Only a small population of traumatized elephants survived by hiding in the coastal forests and becoming nocturnal. Certain elusive antelope like red duikers, reedbuck, and sunis also managed to survive in low numbers. Besides that, all of the other game species were wiped out. However, significant reintroductions began in 2010, starting with the release of greater kudu, common warthog, impala, nyala, and Burchell's zebra. South African giraffes were reintroduced in 2012, and blue wildebeest returned in 2013. Waterbuck and Cape buffalo were both brought back in 2017. In 2019, two antelope species, oribi and common eland, were both reintroduced into the park after being absent for decades. Along with that, the elephant population has naturally grown to 400. The elephant population has also benefited from the restoration of ecological connectivity with Tembe Elephant Park in South Africa, allowing elephants to move once again through parts of their historic transboundary range. The recovery has been remarkable: by 2024 more than 5,385 animals had been translocated into the park, and a 2025 aerial census recorded approximately 32,800 game animals.

The war also led to nearly all of the park's predators being wiped out. Only a small group of five spotted hyenas survived the war. To augment the population, in 2023 and 2024, hyenas were reintroduced from Sabie Game Park. Cheetahs were also extirpated, but a founder group of four cheetahs was reintroduced to the park in 2021. Leopards have also been seen naturally recolonizing the park following the war.

Small remnant populations of hippos and Nile crocodiles both managed to survive the war by hiding deep inside the coastal lakes and swamp forests in the park. Their numbers have since grown and they are now a common sight in areas like Lakes Xinguti, Piti, and Maundo. Smaller mammals that survived the war and are present today include side-striped jackals, African civets, genets, honey badgers, Cape porcupines, Samango monkeys, and vervet monkeys. In terms of marine life, Hawksbill sea turtles, green sea turtles, leatherback sea turtles, and loggerhead sea turtles are all present here. Indo-Pacific bottlenose dolphins, humpback whales, and dugongs are both common, along with whale sharks, reef sharks, and manta rays.

The park also supports more than 360 bird species, including notable species such as Neergaard's sunbird, Rudd's apalis, pink-throated twinspot, southern banded snake-eagle, Pel's fishing-owl and southern ground-hornbill.

== Management ==
The park is an element of the Lubombo Transfrontier Conservation Area, which includes national parks from South Africa, Mozambique and Eswatini.

In 2018 the transfrontier conservation group Peace Parks Foundation signed a partnership agreement with the Mozambique government to support the management and development of the Maputo Special Reserve and adjacent Ponta do Ouro Partial Marine Reserve. This comprised US$16 million donated by a number of donors, including the Reinet Foundation, Wyss Foundation and World Bank funded MozBio programme.

Eco-tourism infrastructure in the reserve consists of Sulula resort (formerly Anvil Bay), as well as chalets, safari tents, and campsites at Ponta Membene.

In 2025, the site was designated as a World Heritage Site by UNESCO as part of an expansion from the ISimangaliso Wetland Park in neighbouring South Africa.
