= Cirrhimuraena orientalis =

Conservation status
- Data Deficient (IUCN 3.1)

Scientific classification
- Kingdom: Animalia
- Phylum: Chordata
- Class: Actinopterygii
- Order: Anguilliformes
- Family: Ophichthidae
- Genus: Cirrhimuraena
- Species: C. orientalis

Binomial name
- Cirrhimuraena orientalis Nguyen, 1993

Species of fish

Cirrhimuraena orientalis is an eel in the family Ophichthidae (worm/snake eels). It was described by Nguyen Khac Huong in 1993. It is a tropical, marine eel which is known from Vietnam, in the western Pacific Ocean.
