= Tembe River =

River in Mozambique

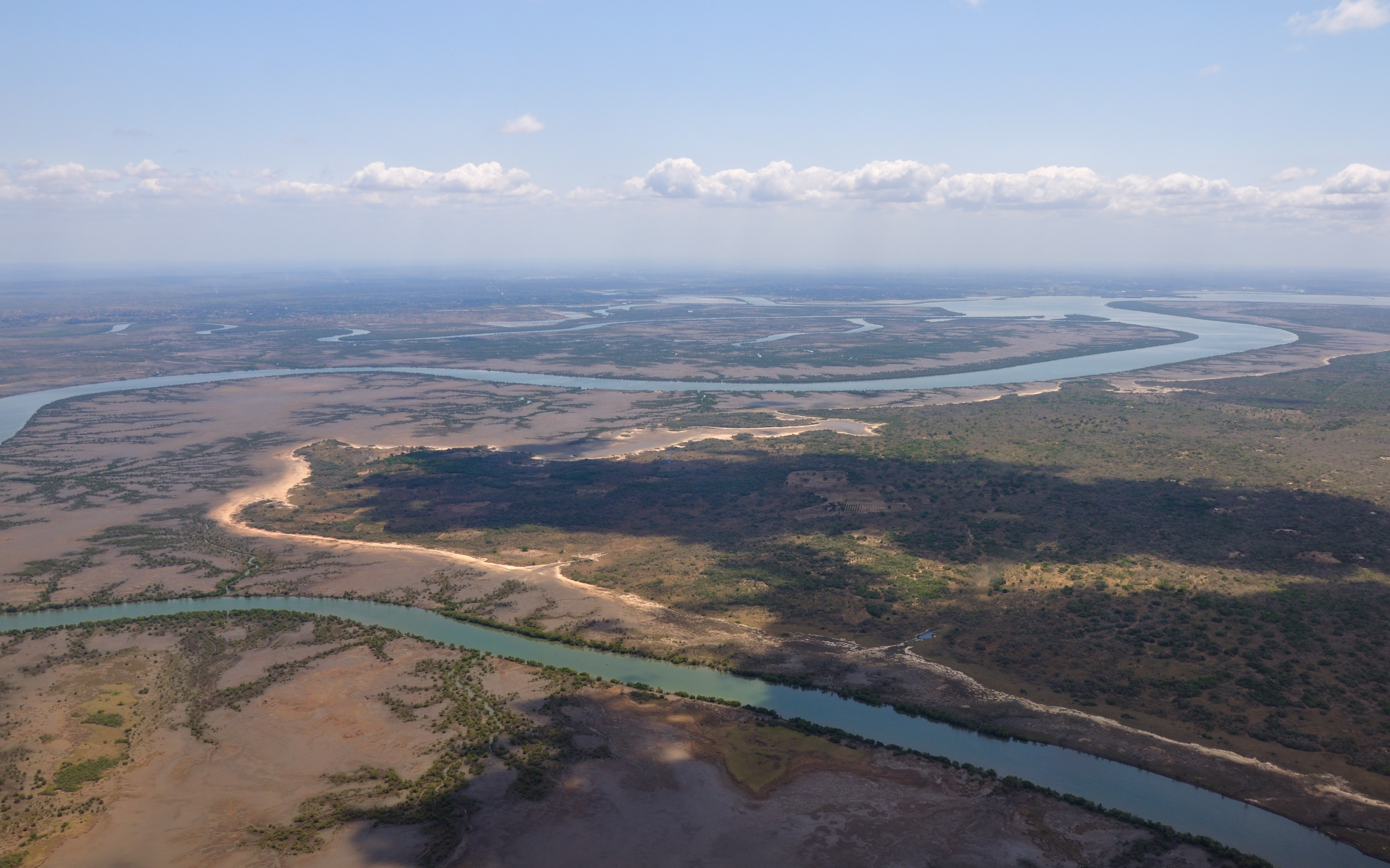
Mouth of Tembe River into the Estuário do Espírito Santo with the Mbuluzi River in the background.

The Tembe River (Portuguese: Rio Tembe) is situated in the Maputo Province, Mozambique. Together with the rivers Matola, Umbuluzi, and Infulene, it forms the Estuário do Espírito Santo, where the capital Maputo is located, and the main port of the country, Port Maputo.
