= Cirrhimuraena yuanding =

Conservation status
- Data Deficient (IUCN 3.1)

Scientific classification
- Kingdom: Animalia
- Phylum: Chordata
- Class: Actinopterygii
- Order: Anguilliformes
- Family: Ophichthidae
- Genus: Cirrhimuraena
- Species: C. yuanding

Binomial name
- Cirrhimuraena yuanding W. Q. Tang & C. G. Zhang, 2003

Species of fish

Cirrhimuraena yuanding is an eel in the family Ophichthidae (worm/snake eels). It was described by Tang Wen-Qiao and Zhang Chun-Guang in 2003. It is a subtropical, marine eel which is known from the East China Sea, in the northwestern Pacific Ocean. Males can reach a maximum total length of 52 centimetres.

The species epithet refers to Professor Zhu Yuang-Ding, the leading authority on ichthyology and fishery science in China.
