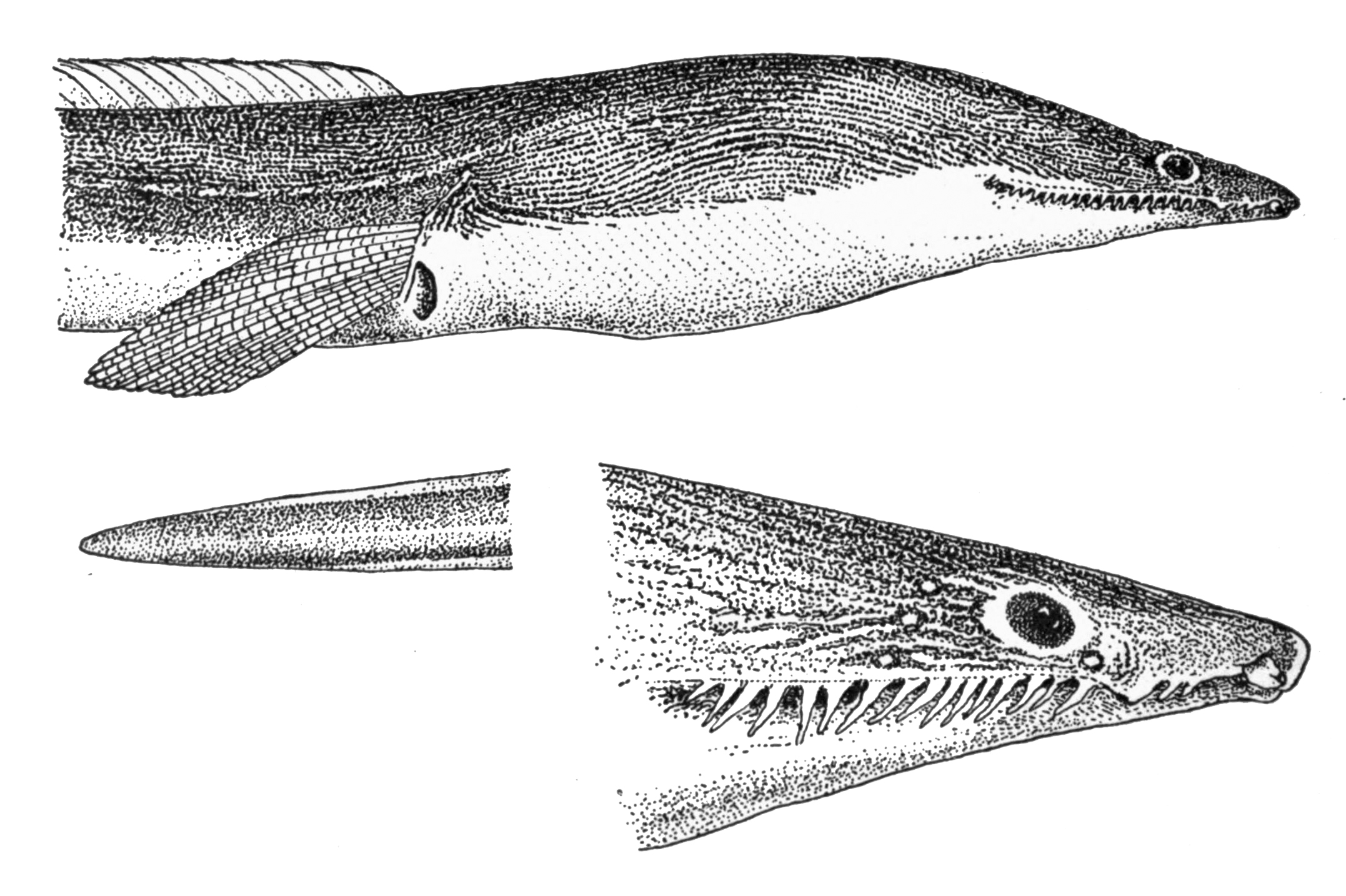

Conservation status
- Least Concern (IUCN 3.1)

Scientific classification
- Kingdom: Animalia
- Phylum: Chordata
- Class: Actinopterygii
- Order: Anguilliformes
- Family: Ophichthidae
- Genus: Cirrhimuraena
- Species: C. chinensis

Binomial name
- Cirrhimuraena chinensis Kaup, 1856

Synonyms
- Ophisurus polyodon Bleeker, 1860

= Cirrhimuraena chinensis =

Species of fish

Cirrhimuraena chinensis is an eel in the family Ophichthidae (worm/snake eels). It was described by Johann Jakob Kaup in 1856. It is a tropical, marine eel which is known from China and Papua New Guinea, in the western Pacific Ocean. Males can reach a maximum standard length of 54.8 centimetres.
