= Goa expedition to Lourenço Marques =

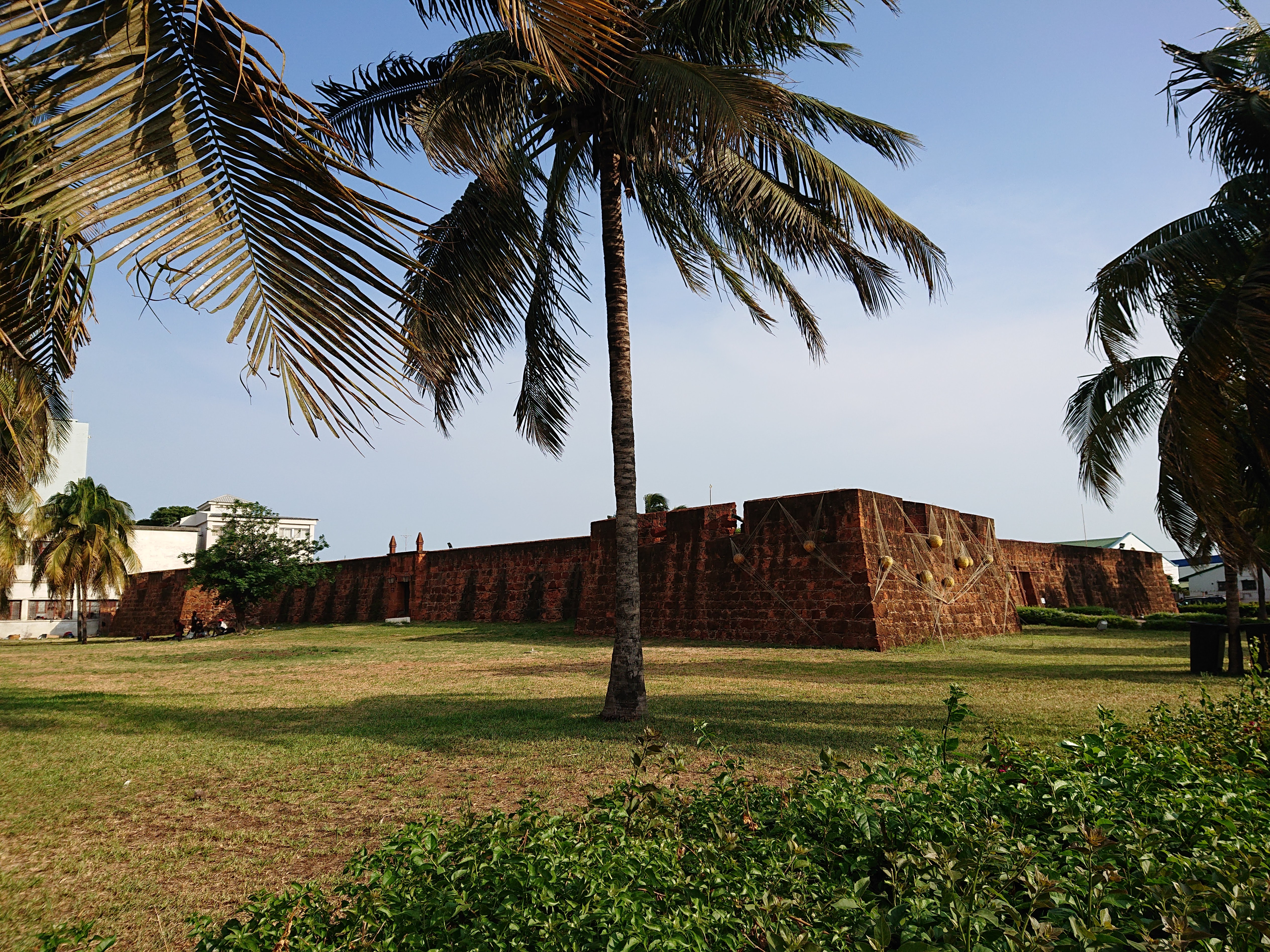
- Fort Nossa Senhora da Conceição de Lourenço Marques, built in 1782
Date	31 March – 3 May 1781 (1 month and 3 days)
Location	Delagoa Bay
Result	Portuguese victory
Territorial changes	End of the Austrian presence Establishment of Lourenço Marques

Belligerents
Kingdom of Portugal	Archduchy of Austria

Commanders and leaders
Godinho de Mira; Lobo da Gama; Mourão Garcez Palha	Daniel Pollet (POW)

Units involved
Sant'Ana; S. Joaquim	Proli; Ferninand

Strength
500 men	10 men

Casualties and losses
Unknown	Garrison imprisoned 2 ships captured

The Goa expedition to Lourenço Marques was a military and diplomatic expedition launched by the Kingdom of Portugal in 1781 against Austrian establishments at Delagoa Bay, Mozambique. The operation aimed to reassert Portuguese sovereignty over the bay.

In 1778, William Bolts, in the service of Austria, established a settlement with 155 men. Bolts eventually departed, leaving it under the leadership of Andreas Daniel Pollet.

By April 1781, alarmed by the raising of the Imperial flag where they claimed as their own sphere of influence, the Portuguese dispatched an expedition to dismantle the establishment. The Portuguese destroyed the Austrian forts, imprisoned the garrison, including their commander, Pollet, and captured two ships. This expedition ended the Austrian presence in Delagoa Bay and led to the founding of Lourenço Marques, securing permanent Portuguese presence in the region.

== Bibliography ==
- Lobato, Alexandre (August 2000). Os Austríacos em Lourenço Marques (in Portuguese).
- Wanner, Michal (2012). "Imperial Asiatic Company in Trieste and Antwerp – the last attempt of the Habsburg monarchy to penetrate East Indian trade 1775-1785" (PDF). Miscellanea Historico–Archivis: 177–202. ISSN 0860-1054.
