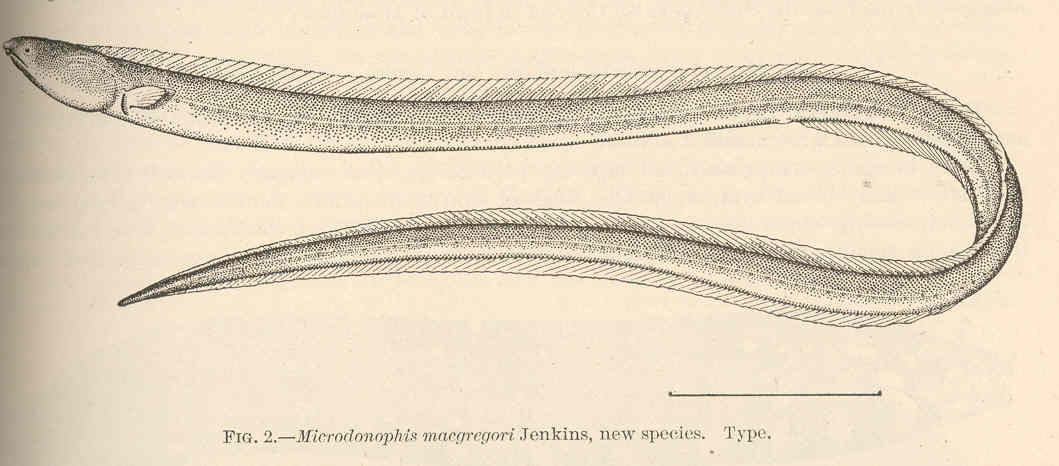

Conservation status
- Least Concern (IUCN 3.1)

Scientific classification
- Kingdom: Animalia
- Phylum: Chordata
- Class: Actinopterygii
- Order: Anguilliformes
- Family: Ophichthidae
- Genus: Cirrhimuraena
- Species: C. playfairii

Binomial name
- Cirrhimuraena playfairii (Günther, 1870)

Synonyms
- Ophichthys playfairii Günther, 1870; Jenkinsiella playfairi (Günther, 1870); Jenkinsiella playfairii (Günther, 1870); Ophichthys arenicola Klunzinger, 1871; Microdonophis macgregori Jenkins, 1903

= Fringelip snake-eel =

Species of fish

The fringelip snake-eel (Cirrhimuraena playfairii) is an eel in the family Ophichthidae (worm/snake eels). It was described by Albert Günther in 1870. It is a marine, tropical eel which is known from the Indo-Pacific, including Zanzibar, Tanzania, Kosi Bay, South Africa, and the Hawaiian Islands. Its lifestyle is mostly benthic but it sometimes swims at the surface. It is olive brown in colour, with lighter colouring in the ventral region. Males can reach a maximum total length of 39 centimetres (15 in).
