= Matola River =

River in Mozambique

Coordinates: 25°59′31″S 32°28′21″E

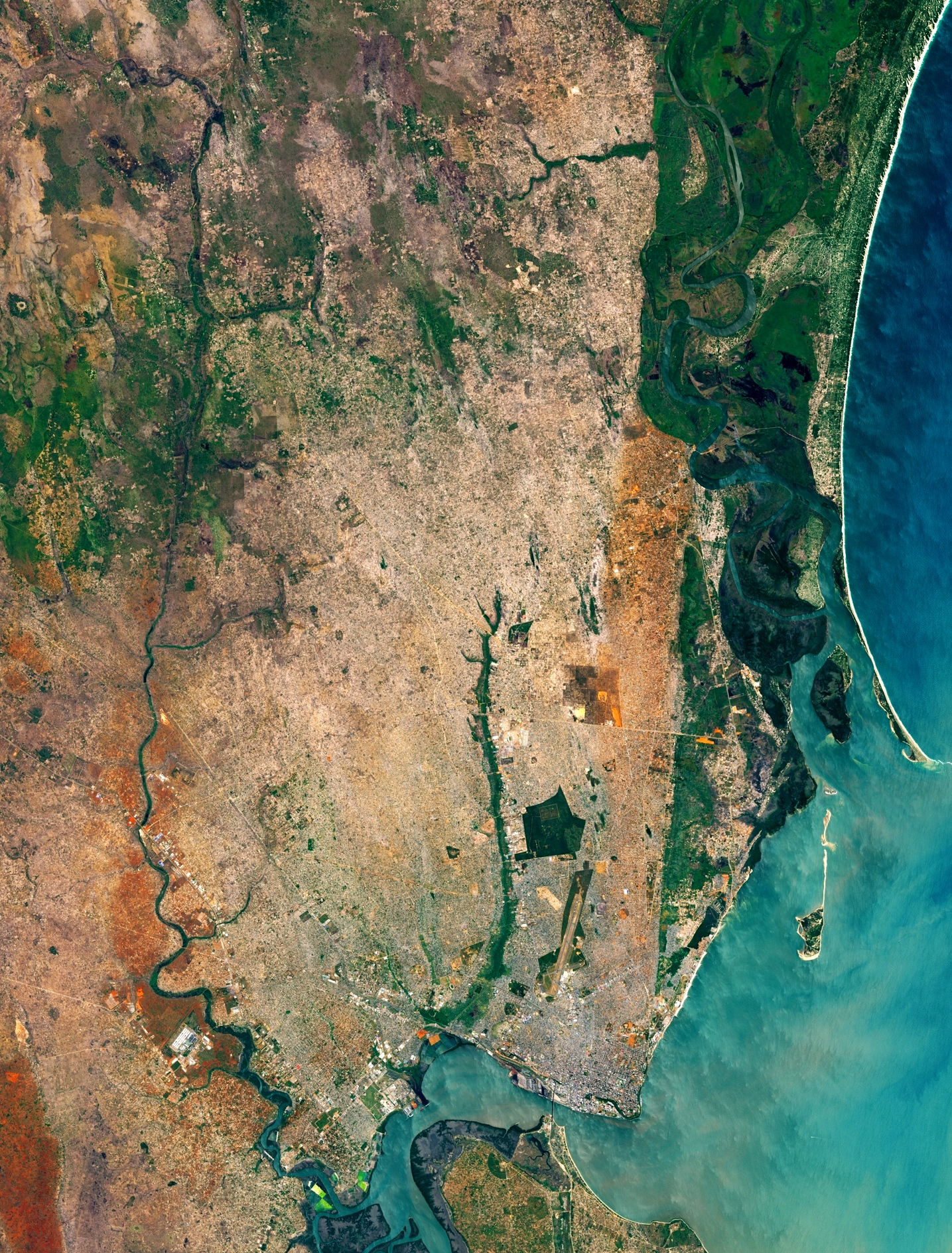
Matola River to the left, and the Infulene River on the right, imaged by Sentinel-2

The Matola River (Portuguese: Rio Matola) is a watercourse located in the Maputo Province of Mozambique. It has a length of 60 kilometers and flows into the Estuário do Espírito Santo, on the banks of which Maputo and Port Maputo were built.

Formerly the river was called Espírito Santo, which gave rise to the name of the estuary that it shares with three other rivers: Tembe, the Mbuluzi, and the Infulene River.
