= Cirrhimuraena paucidens =

Conservation status
- Data Deficient (IUCN 3.1)

Scientific classification
- Kingdom: Animalia
- Phylum: Chordata
- Class: Actinopterygii
- Order: Anguilliformes
- Family: Ophichthidae
- Genus: Cirrhimuraena
- Species: C. paucidens

Binomial name
- Cirrhimuraena paucidens Herre & G. S. Myers, 1931

Species of fish

Cirrhimuraena paucidens is an eel in the family Ophichthidae (worm/snake eels). It was described by Albert William Herre and George S. Myers in 1931. It is a subtropical, marine eel which is known from the western central Pacific Ocean.
