= Cirrhimuraena calamus =

Conservation status
- Data Deficient (IUCN 3.1)

Scientific classification
- Kingdom: Animalia
- Phylum: Chordata
- Class: Actinopterygii
- Order: Anguilliformes
- Family: Ophichthidae
- Genus: Cirrhimuraena
- Species: C. calamus

Binomial name
- Cirrhimuraena calamus (Günther, 1870)

Synonyms
- Ophichthys calamus Günther, 1870

Species of fish

Cirrhimuraena calamus, known commonly as the fringed-lipped snake-eel or the fringelip snake eel, is an eel in the family Ophichthidae (worm/snake eels). It was described by Albert Günther in 1870. It is a marine, temperate water-dwelling eel which is endemic to western Australia, in the eastern Indian Ocean. It forms burrows in the soft bottoms of inshore waters.
