= Estuário do Espírito Santo =

Estuary on Maputo Bay, Mozambique

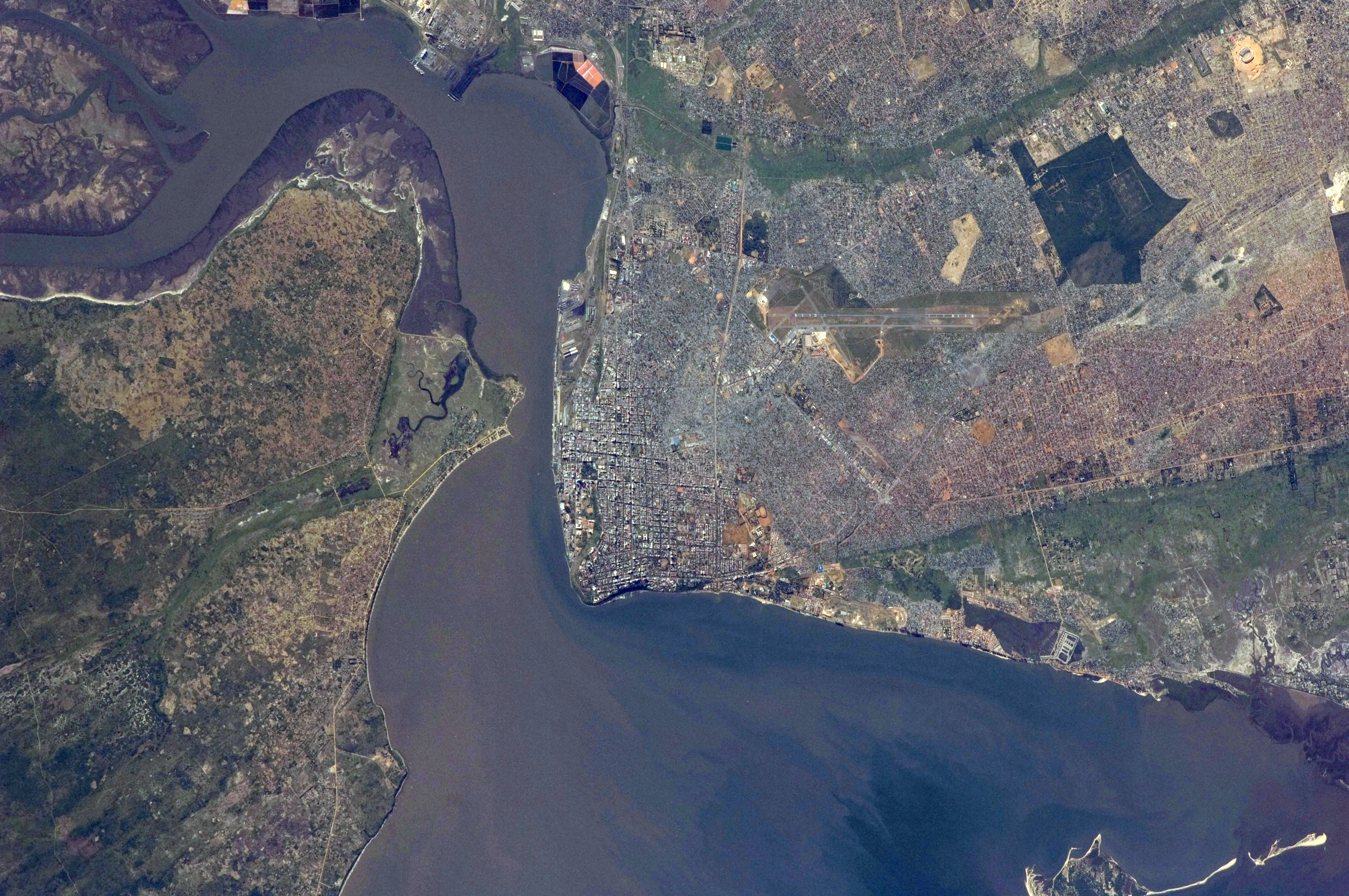
Maputo, Mozambique.JPG

The Estuário do Espírito Santo is an estuary on the western bank of Maputo Bay, Mozambique where four rivers flow: the Tembe, Mbuluzi, Matola and Infulene Rivers. Its maximum depth is 11 meters, with the channels dredged.

The north bank of this estuary has a large economic activity, ending in a large commercial and fishing port. The part of the municipality of Matola is highly industrialized, including an old oil refinery, a cement factory, salinas and other activities.

The part of the margins not modified by man is populated by mangroves and is subject to enormous pressure by the aforementioned economic activities. However, the estuary is still used by many fisheries, since there is an abundance of shrimp and other seafoods.

== Toponymy ==
The term estuario de Espíritu Santo refers to the old name of the Matola River, which was known in Portuguese as Río Espírito Santo.
