= Inhaca =

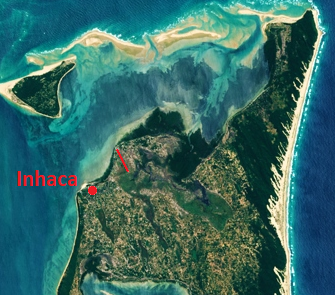
- Inhaca and the runway of Inhaca Airport highlighted in red

- Location in southern Mozambique
- Coordinates: 26°0′S 32°55′E
- Country: Mozambique
- Provinces: Maputo Province

Inhaca is a settlement in Mozambique, on the subtropical Inhaca Island (Ilha da Inhaca in Portuguese) off the East African coast. Inhaca settlement is centered on a mission station located about 32 km east of Maputo.

== Geography and administration ==
The 52 km^{2} island separates Maputo Bay (Baía de Maputo) to the west from the Indian Ocean off its eastern shores. The island's irregular coastline approaches the mainland's Machangulo peninsula at Ponta Torres where a 500m-wide tidal race separates the two headlands. In administrative terms Inhaca is a municipal district of the municipality of Maputo, while the Machangulo peninsula is included under the Lubombo Transfrontier Conservation Area and is part of the district of Matutuíne, Maputo Province.

== Economy ==
A population of about 6,000 people subsist on fishing and agriculture. At low tide women harvest crabs, oysters and fish from the western shallows. At high tide fishing boats leave the island for deeper sea fishing. The island is a popular winter destination of South African tourists.

== History ==
Tsonga chief Nhaca, a protector of early shipwrecked Portuguese sailors, lends his name to the later settlement. Later 16th century Portuguese traders established an Inhaca Island base to ply the Bay of the Lagoon's (Baía da Lagoa) rivers in search of ivory. A 1747 map by Emanuel Bowen records 'Inhaqua' settlement on the mainland peninsula while referring to the island as 'I. S. Maria'.

The first light house dates from 1894, and was upgraded in the 1920s. A marine biological station (the 'MBS') 26°02′17″S 32°54′12″E was built in 1951 and some of the shores were declared nature reserves in 1976. Of late the biological station came under administration of the Eduardo Mondlane University.

== Traveller's destinations ==
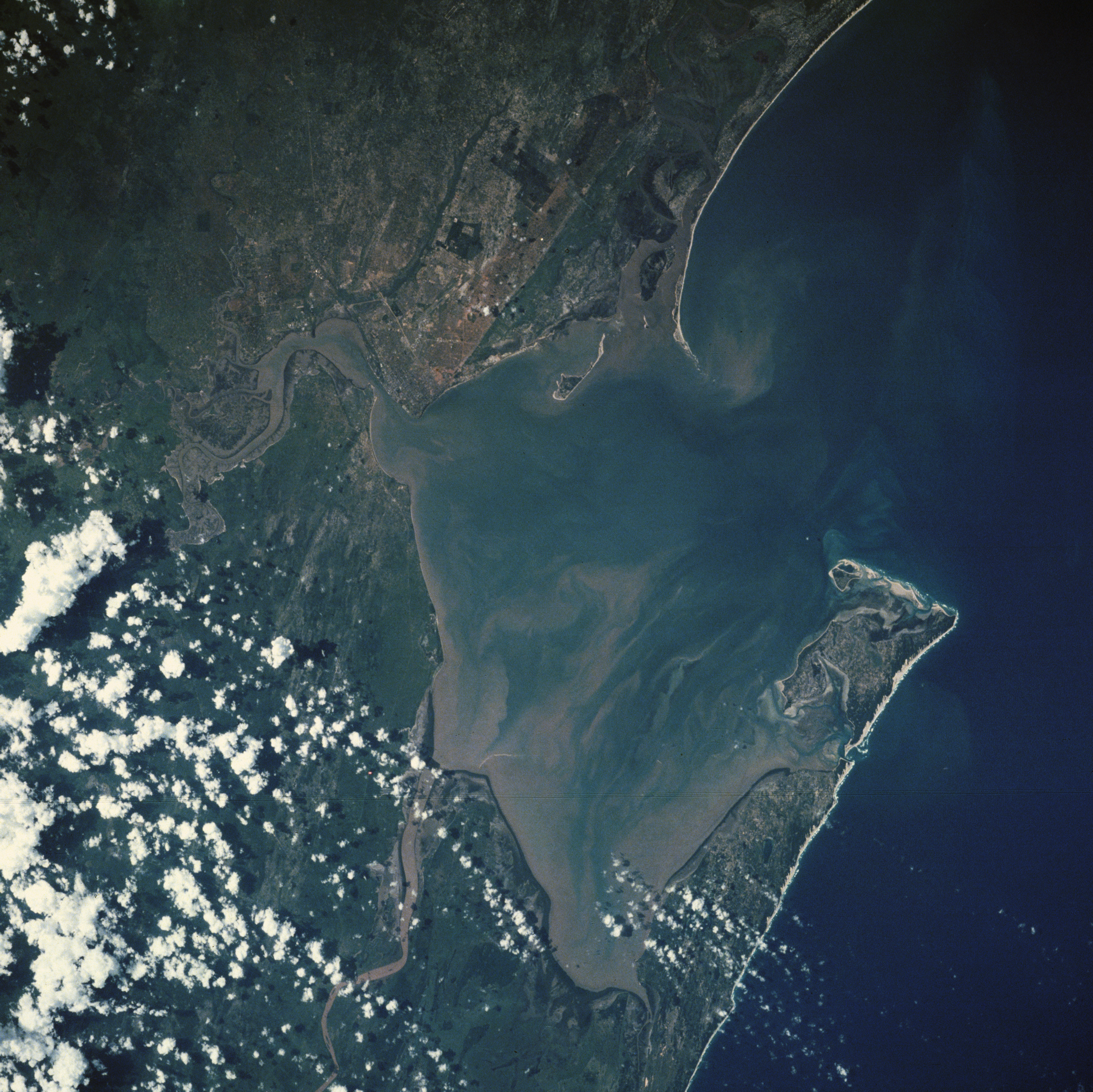
Maputo Bay from space in January 1990. Inhaca Island and Machangulo Peninsula are clearly visible at the bottom right edge of the bay

The Inhacazul Lodge and Pestana Hotel are the main destinations of travellers from where different excursions are often undertaken, including scuba diving and snorkelling outings. Backpackers mostly visit a catering camping area within walking distance of the landing jetty, and are required to take bottled water and their own tents. Inhaca village is within a 5-minute drive from the camp where there are two restaurants, two bars, a grocery store and a marketplace.

The Island can be visited by means of a Ferry which departs from the Porto de Pesca, Maputo at 8:00 and returns at 15:00 every Saturday and Sunday. Travellers reach the island's landing jetty at high tide, but have to wade some sandy shallows during low tide.

There are also return flights that depart from Maputo airport and these 18 seater planes reach the island airstrip in fifteen minutes.

== References and external links ==
- Reader's Digest Atlas of Southern Africa
- A natural history of Inhaca Island, Mozambique. Margaret Kalk, J de Koning, 1995
- Mozambique, Islands in the Sun by Keri Harvey 26 October 2004
- Destination Mozambique
- Dive Mozambique

== See also ==
- Inhaca Island
