= Machangulo =

Mozambican peninsula

- Peninsula
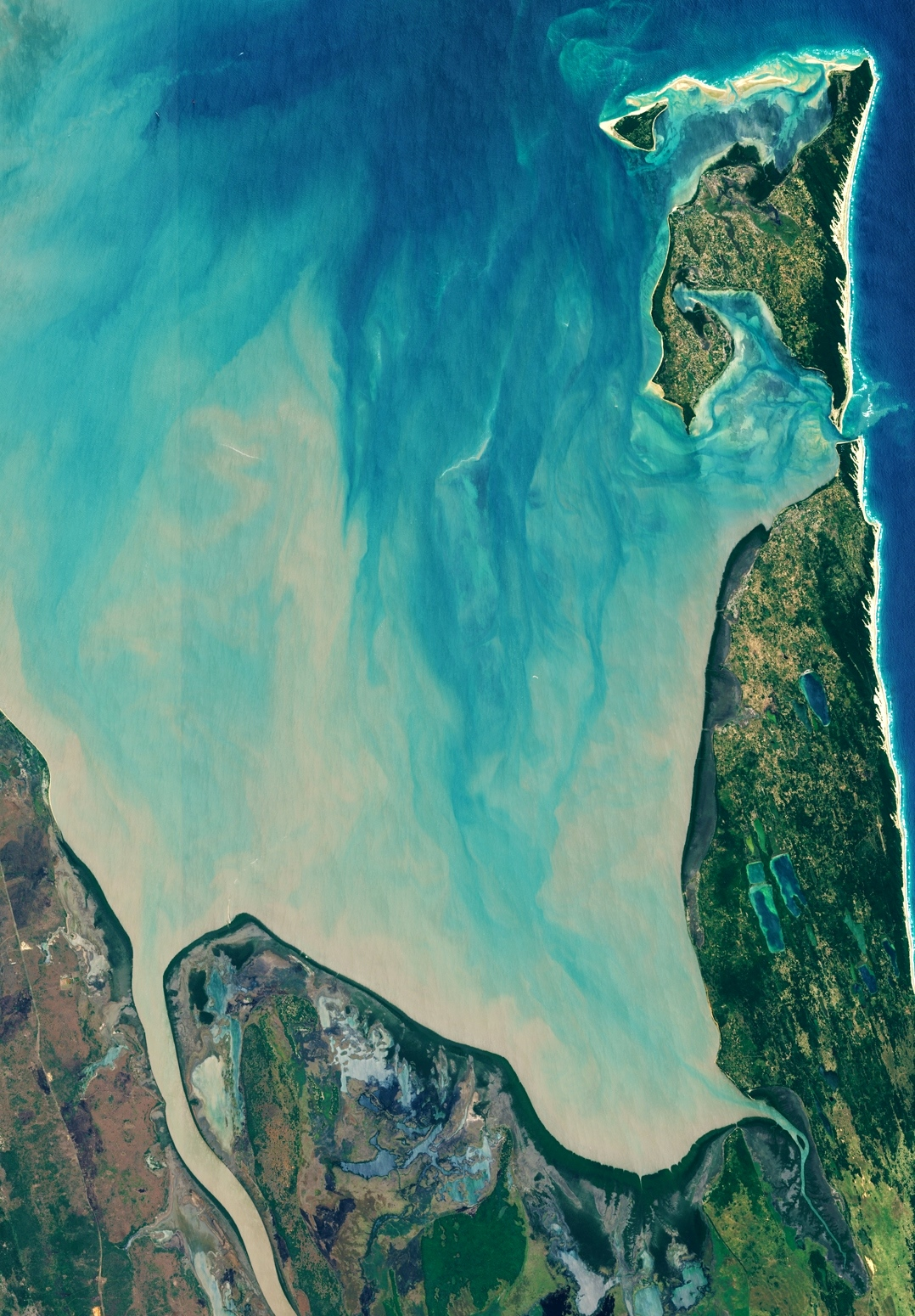
- The southern perimeter of Maputo Bay from space: Machangulo peninsula and Inhaca Island are at right and top right respectively.

- Location within Mozambique
- Coordinates: 26.2164°S 32.8733°E
- Location: Southern Mozambique
- Water bodies: Maputo Bay

The Machangulo peninsula is situated in the southernmost part of Mozambique adjacent to Inhaca and Portuguese Islands in the Maputo Bay.
