= Maputo Bay =

Bay in Mozambique

- 'Baía de Maputo (Portuguese)
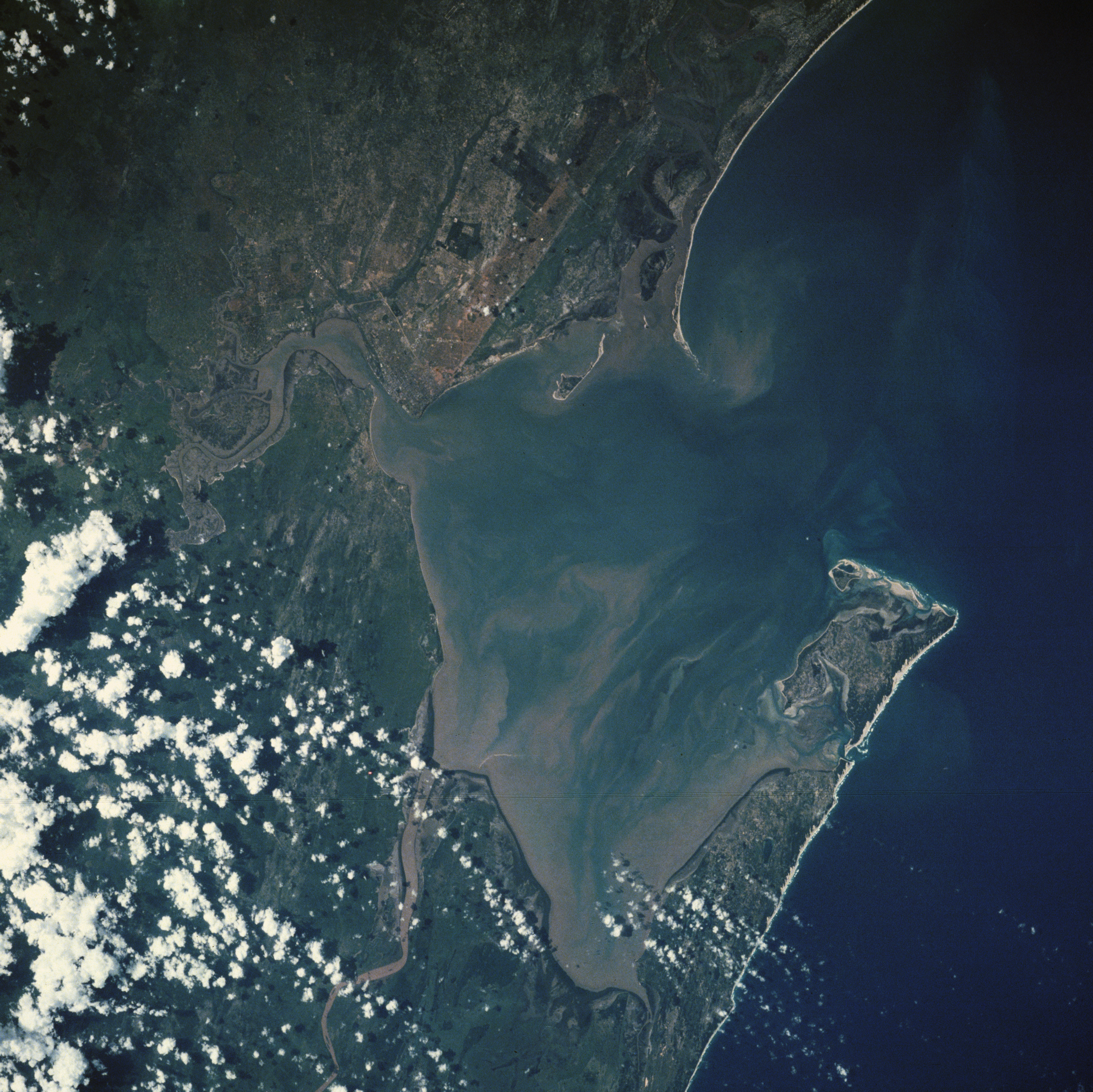
- Maputo Bay from space, January 1990

- Location in Mozambique
- Coordinates: 25°59′S 32°42′E
- Ocean/sea sources: Indian Ocean
- Basin countries: Mozambique
- Max. length: 24 km (15 mi)
- Max. width: 36 km (22 mi)
- Settlements: Maputo

Maputo Bay (Portuguese: Baía de Maputo), formerly also known as Delagoa Bay from Baía da Lagoa in Portuguese, is an inlet of the Indian Ocean on the coast of Mozambique, between 25° 40' and 26° 20' S, with a length from north to south of over 90 km long and 32 km wide.

== Geography ==
The bay is the northern termination of the series of lagoons which line the coast from Saint Lucia Bay. The opening is toward the northeast. The northwestern end of the bay is defined by the Ponta da Macaneta, a spit with beaches facing westwards towards the Mozambique Channel, and mangroves behind. The eastern side of the bay is defined by the Machangulo peninsula, which on its inner or western side affords safe anchorage. North of the peninsula is Inhaca Island, and beyond it a smaller island, "Ilha dos Portugueses" (Portuguese Island), formerly known as Elephant's Island.

In spite of a bar at the entrance and a number of shallows within, Maputo Bay forms a valuable harbour, accessible to large vessels at all seasons of the year. The surrounding country is low and very unhealthy, but Inhaca island has a height of 73 m, and was used as a sanatorium.

The Komati River, also known as the Inkomati or Manhissa, enters the bay at its northern end. Three rivers, the Matola from the north, the Mbuluzi or Umbeluzi from the west, and the Tembe from the south, meet in the Estuário do Espírito Santo on the west side of the bay. The city of Maputo lies north of the estuary, and the Maputo–Katembe bridge, completed in 2018, spans the estuary. The Maputo River, which has its headwaters in the Drakensberg, enters in the south.

== Ecology ==
Maputo Bay is part of the Delagoa marine ecoregion. Habitats in the bay include mangrove wetlands, seagrass beds, and fringing coral reefs around Inhaca and Portuguese islands. Humpback whales and several species of dolphins live in the water while southern right whales and dugongs were once numerous in the bay and are rare today.

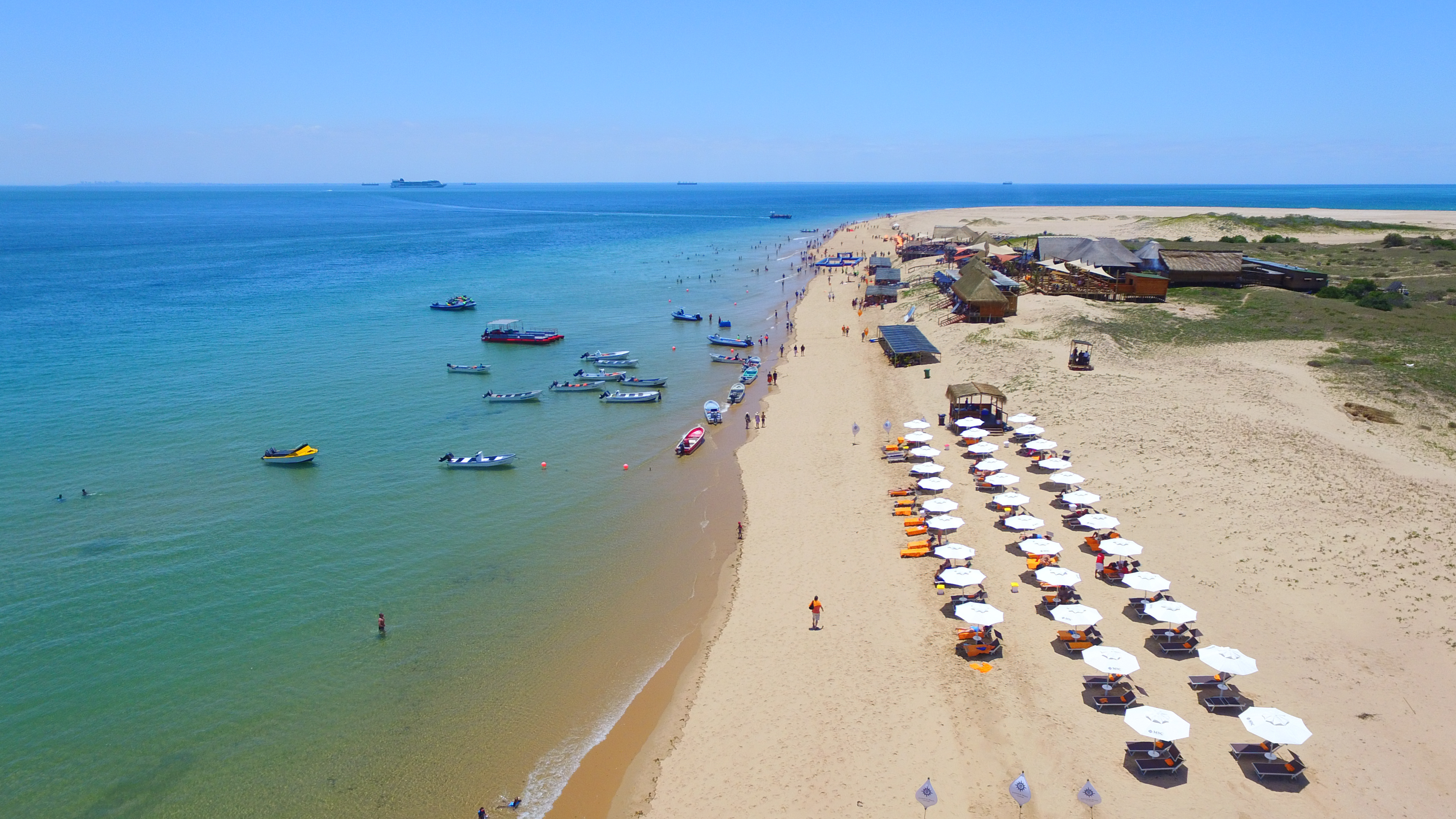
An aerial view of Portuguese Island, a small uninhabited island, located 10 km from Maputo. The island is a popular tourist location in the area.

== History ==
The first European to reach the bay was Portuguese navigator António de Campo, one of Vasco da Gama's captains, in 1502. In 1544 the merchant trader Lourenço Marques explored the upper reaches of the estuaries leading into the bay. Subsequently, King João III ordered the bay to be named Baia de Lourenço Marques. Lourenço Marques is reputed to have named the bay Baía da Lagoa (Portuguese: "Bay of the Lagoon"). In English the Portuguese "Baia da Lagoa" then was translated and slightly transformed to "Delagoa Bay".

In 1720, the Dutch East India Company built a fort and factory called Lijdzaamheid (Lydsaamheid) on the spot of Lourenço Marques (now Maputo), since April 1721 governed by an opperhoofd (chief factor), under authority of the Dutch Cape Colony, interrupted by Taylor's pirate occupation from April 1722 to 28 August 1722; in December 1730 the settlement was abandoned. Thereafter the Portuguese had—intermittently—trading stations in the Espírito Santo estuary. These stations were protected by small forts, usually incapable, however, of withstanding attacks by the natives. In 1779 the Austrian ship Joseph und Theresia of the Austrian East India Company lands at the bay and the Austrians erect the St. Joseph and St. Maria forts. In 1778, an Austrian expedition led by English adventurer William Bolts established a trading factory at Delagoa Bay. The factory, composed of 155 men and a number of women, traded in ivory, reaching as high as 75,000 pounds per year until the factory was expelled by the Portuguese in 1781.

In 1823, Captain (afterwards Vice-Admiral) W. F. W. Owen, of the Royal Navy, finding that the Portuguese exercised no jurisdiction south of the settlement of Lourenço Marques, concluded treaties of cession with native chiefs, hoisted the British flag, and appropriated the country from the English river southwards; but when he visited the bay again in 1824 he found that the Portuguese, disregarding the British treaties, had concluded others with the natives, and had endeavoured (unsuccessfully) to take military possession of the country.

Captain Owen re-hoisted the British flag, but the sovereignty of either power was left undecided till the claims of the Transvaal Republic rendered a solution of the question urgent. In the meantime the United Kingdom had taken no steps to exercise authority on the spot, while the ravages of Zulus confined Portuguese authority to the limits of their fort. In 1835 Boers, under a leader named Orich, had attempted to form a settlement on the bay and in 1868 the Transvaal president, Marthinus Pretorius, claimed the country on each side of the Maputo down to the sea. In the following year, however, the Transvaal acknowledged Portugal's sovereignty over the bay.

In 1861, Royal Navy Captain Bickford declared Inhaca and Elephant islands to be British territory; an act protested by the authorities in Lisbon. In 1872, the dispute between the United Kingdom and Portugal was submitted to the arbitration of Adolphe Thiers, the French president; and on 19 April 1875 his successor, Marshal MacMahon, ruled in favor of the Portuguese.

Previously, the UK and Portugal had agreed that a right of pre-emption would be granted to the unsuccessful claimant in case of sale or cession of the bay. Portuguese authority over the Mozambican interior was not established until some time after the MacMahon decision; nominally, the country south of the Manhissa river was ceded to them by the Matshangana chief Umzila in 1861. In honor of the French president's decision, a beer brewed in Maputo is still today called "MacMahon" or "2M" (Portuguese: "Dois M"). Similarly, the Maputo railway station sat at "Praça MacMahon" (MacMahon Square). After Mozambique's independence from Portugal, it was renamed "Praça dos Trabalhadores" (Workers' Square).

In 1889, another dispute arose between Portugal and the United Kingdom over the Portuguese seizure of the railway running from the bay to the Transvaal. This dispute was also referred to arbitration: in 1900, Portugal was found liable and ordered to pay nearly £1,000,000 in compensation to the railway company's shareholders.

== Sources ==
- Sir E. Hertslet, The Map of Africa by Treaty, iii. 991–998 (London, 1909). An account of the Delagoa Bay arbitration proceedings.
- The British blue-book, Delagoa Bay, Correspondence respecting the Claims of Her Majesty's Government (London, 1875)
- L. van Deventer, La Hollande et la Baie Delagoa (The Hague, 1883)
- Owen, W. F. W. (1833). Narrative of Voyages to Explore the Shores of Africa, Arabia, and Madagascar, Performed in His Majesty's ship Leven and Barracouta under the direction of Captain W. F. W. Owen. Volume 1. J. & J. Harper.
- G. McC. Theal, The Portuguese in South Africa (London, 1896), and History of South Africa since September 179, f, vol. v. (London, 1908). The Narrative of Voyages to explore the shores of Africa, performed under direction of Captain W. F. W. Owen, RN. (London, 1833) contains much interesting information concerning the district in the early part of the 19th century.
- WorldStatesmen- Mozambique
