= Inhaca Island =

Island in Mozambique

Native name: Ilha da Inhaca
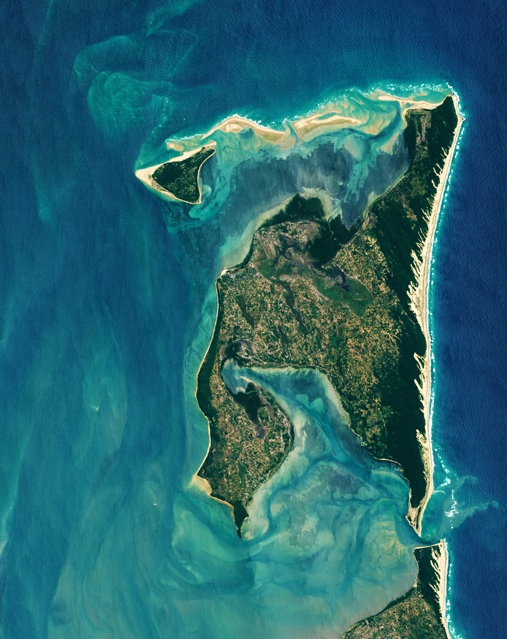
- Viewed by Sentinel-2 of the Copernicus Programme

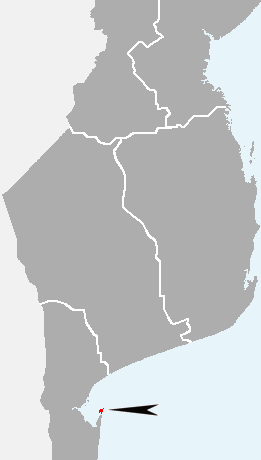
- Location in southern Mozambique

Geography
- Location: Indian Ocean
- Adjacent to: Maputo Bay
- Area: 52 km^{2} (20 sq mi)
- Length: 12 km (7.5 mi)
- Width: 7 km (4.3 mi)
- Highest elevation: 104 m (341 ft)
- Highest point: Mount Inhaca

Administration
- Mozambique
- Municipality: Maputo

Inhaca Island (Portuguese: Ilha da Inhaca), also known as Kanyaka island, is a subtropical island of Mozambique off the East African coast. The main village is Inhaca, situated just over a kilometer from Inhaca Airport. Various tourist lodges are situated along the northwestern coastline. The island is flanked by protected areas along the western and eastern coastlines, while the majority of the population lives in the interior.

The 52 km^{2} (20 sq mi) island separates Maputo Bay (Baía de Maputo) to the west from the Indian Ocean off its eastern shores. The island's irregular coastline approaches the mainland Machangulo peninsula at Ponta Torres where a 500-metre-wide (1,600 ft) tidal race separates the two headlands. In administrative terms Inhaca is a municipal district of the municipality of Maputo, while the Machangulo peninsula is included under the Lubombo Transfrontier Conservation Area and is part of the district of Matutuíne, Maputo Province.

== Geographical features ==
The island's dimensions are approximately 12 km (n-s) by 7 km (e-w). The highest point above sea level is the 104-metre (341 ft) Mount Inhaca on the north-eastern shoreline. The south-western peninsula is known as Ponta Punduine while Ponta Torres to the south-east approaches the mainland. Two inland swamps occur at the northerly airstrip and southern Nhaquene respectively. Besides Inhaca settlement on the western shore there are five smaller villages including Inguane, Nhaquene, Ridjeni and Tobia.

== History ==
Despite being a part of the Portuguese Mozambique until 1975, the island of Inhaca, so close to the harbour of Maputo, was occupied by the British from 1823 until the MacMahon Treaty of 24 July 1875. The British used the island (amongst many others all around Africa) to patrol and control the slave traffic in the region.

== Ecology ==
=== Flora ===
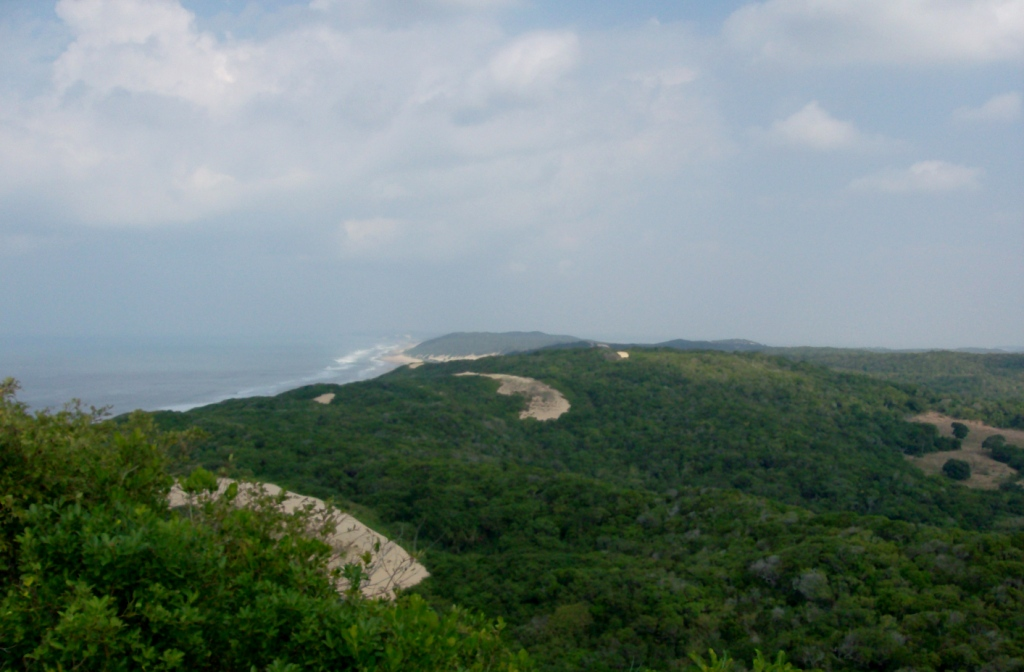
Monte Inhaca is a forested dune on the northeastern shoreline that reaches 104 m in altitude.

The island is a regular destination for ecotourists and ecological researchers. The central land area consists of cultivated fields, while grassy plains are found to the north, flanked by protected usnea-covered dune forests along the eastern and western shores. Extensive exposed mudflats fringe the western and southern shores at low tide. Mangroves cover large sections of the northern shores and southern Saco Bay.

The sub-tropical evergreen forest on the island includes the following tree species: Sideroxylon inerme, Apodytes dimidiata, Euclea schimperi, Manilkara discolor, Dovyalis rhamnoides, Dovyalis tristis, Diospyros natalensis, Clausena anisata, Cassine papillosa, Olea africana, Ficus burtt-davyi, Ficus sansibarica, Ficus capensis, Commiphora neglecta, Commiphora schlechteri, Allophylus melanocarpus, Erythroxylon emarginatum, Vepris undulata, Deinbollia oblongifolia, Scolopia ecklonii, Thespesia populnea and Galpinia transvaalica.

=== Fauna ===
Among 160 coral species are staghorn and plate corals. There are two badly damaged pure coral reefs flanking the island's western perimeters, in very shallow water, which are supposed to be protected but in reality there is no actual control of the marine reserves.

Conspicuous fish are king mackerel - called serra, besides potato bass, barracuda and giant trevally. Others present are brindle bass/giant grouper, scorpionfish, butterflyfish, pufferfish, parrotfish, moray eel, Inhaca fringelip and seahorses. Whale sharks and manta rays visit in summer.

==== Cetaceans ====
Although humpback whales migrate seasonally past these shores, whale watching has never become a popular attraction here. The ocean is generally too rough and the whales too far out, while the hiring boats are too expensive for the average person. Southern right whales have become rare today, though whales were historically abundant before they were wiped out by commercial and illegal hunts, including mass illegal hunts by the Soviet Union and Japan during the 1960s and 1970s.

Resident populations of the Indo-Pacific humpbacked dolphin and the Indian Ocean bottlenose dolphin occur in the waters around the island. The bottlenose dolphin's abundance fluctuates seasonally, increasing during the austral winter. The humpback dolphin is more sedentary, living in extremely shallow inshore areas of the western and southern coasts, and form larger groups (11-14 dolphins) than recorded elsewhere in southern Africa. Bottlenose dolphins frequent the waters of the northwestern coast, and their group size varies largely from individuals and pairs to hundreds of dolphins.

==== Other mammals and reptiles ====
A very small, remaining population of dugong also occur here. Two species of sea turtles (loggerheads and critically endangered leatherbacks) visit the eastern shores in summer to breed.

==== Birds ====
Inhaca is home to about 300 bird species, both resident and migratory. Species of conservation concern are the pink-backed pelican, lesser crested tern, crab plover, greater sand plover, Mongolian plover, Terek sandpiper, southern banded snake eagle, mangrove kingfisher, grey-rumped swallow and spotted ground thrush. The snake eagle, ground thrush and mangrove kingfisher are specials of the southeasterly coastal regions, besides Rudd's apalis, Neergaard's sunbird and pink-throated twinspot which are also present. The southerly Nhaquene Swamp and Saco Bay are strongholds for the sooty falcon, while Eleonora's falcon is a rare vagrant. Terns roost on the northerly Portuguese Island 25°58′31″S 32°54′38″E and house crows established themselves during the 1970s.

== Demographics ==
The island has a population of around 6,000.

== Economics ==
The island has traditionally had a large fishing sector, although fish stocks have decreased in modern times. There are attempts to develop a sustainable Perna mussel aquaculture practice. Tourism also contributes to the economy.

== Gazetteer of landmarks and villages ==
- Inhaca 26°00′17″S 32°54′52″E
- Inhaca Airport 25°59′52″S 32°55′45″E
- Inhaca lighthouse 25°58′36″S 32°59′18″E
- Inguane 26°00′07″S 32°57′23″E
- Marine biological station 26°02′17″S 32°54′12″E
- Mount Botelho 26°02′14″S 32°57′47″E
- Mount Inhaca 25°59′48″S 32°58′39″E
- Nhaquene 26°02′57″S 32°54′30″E
- Ponta Ponduine 26°04′13″S 32°54′17″E
- Ponta Torres 26°04′47″S 32°57′18″E
- Ridjeni 26°00′12″S 32°55′09″E
