= Mbuluzi River =

River in Eswatini and Mozambique

Coordinates: 25.9733°S 32.5577°E

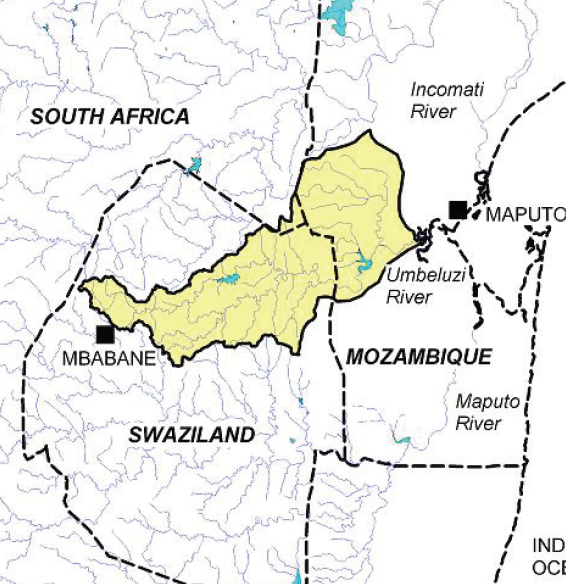
Catchment area of the Mbuluzi River in northern Eswatini, southern Mozambique, and (marginally) eastern South Africa

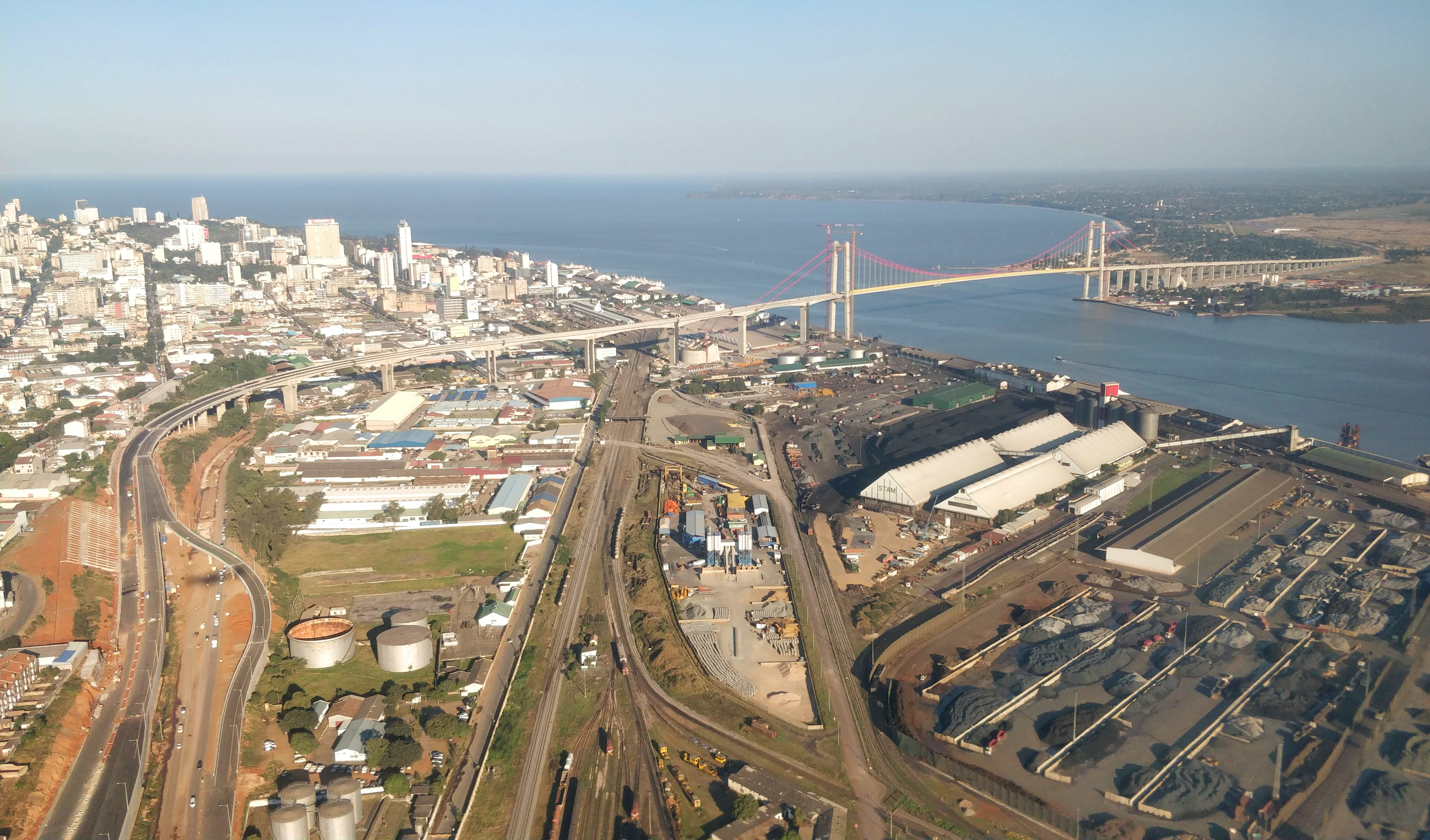
A view of the Maputo–Katembe bridge that spans the river and Maputo Bay's northern shore at Maputo, Mozambique

The Mbuluzi River (also known as the iMbuluzi or Umbeluzi) is one of the main rivers of Eswatini, and an important river in Mozambique. On the boundary of these countries, the Mbuluzi cuts through the Lebombo Range, before entering the Mozambican plain. It empties into the Estuário do Espírito Santo and then Maputo Bay at Maputo, and its waters pass under the Maputo–Katembe bridge, completed in 2018.

The river has two sources, one in the highveld north of Mbabane, which is known as the Black Mbuluzi, and a second in the middleveld near Manzini, which is known as the White Mbuluzi, or imBuluzane. The river passes through the northeastern lowveld of Eswatini, specifically traversing Hlane Royal National Park and Shewula Nature Reserve. In Eswatini, in the vicinity of the sugar plantations of Mhlume, the river is impounded by the Mnjoli Dam. In Mozambique it is known as the Umbeluzi, and is impounded there by the Pequenos Libombos Dam. The river is augmented by various tributaries before its waters enter Maputo Bay.

Two other major rivers empty into Maputo Bay, namely the Komati or Incomati River from the north, and the Great Usutu or Maputo River from the south.

Drought and dams along the Mbuluzi have increased human-wildlife conflict along the river. In particular, low water levels and dams along the river's length have prevented hippopotamus migration and fragmented populations. Hippos leaving the river at night to forage on neighboring farms have caused property damage and risk injury to residents. The Mbuluzi river is also a location of crocodile attacks on humans. The Mbuluzi recorded 29% of all crocodile attacks on humans in eSwatini from 2000–2016.

== See also ==
- Mbuluzi Game Reserve
