= Infulene River =

River in Mozambique

Coordinates: 25°56′26″S 32°31′30″E

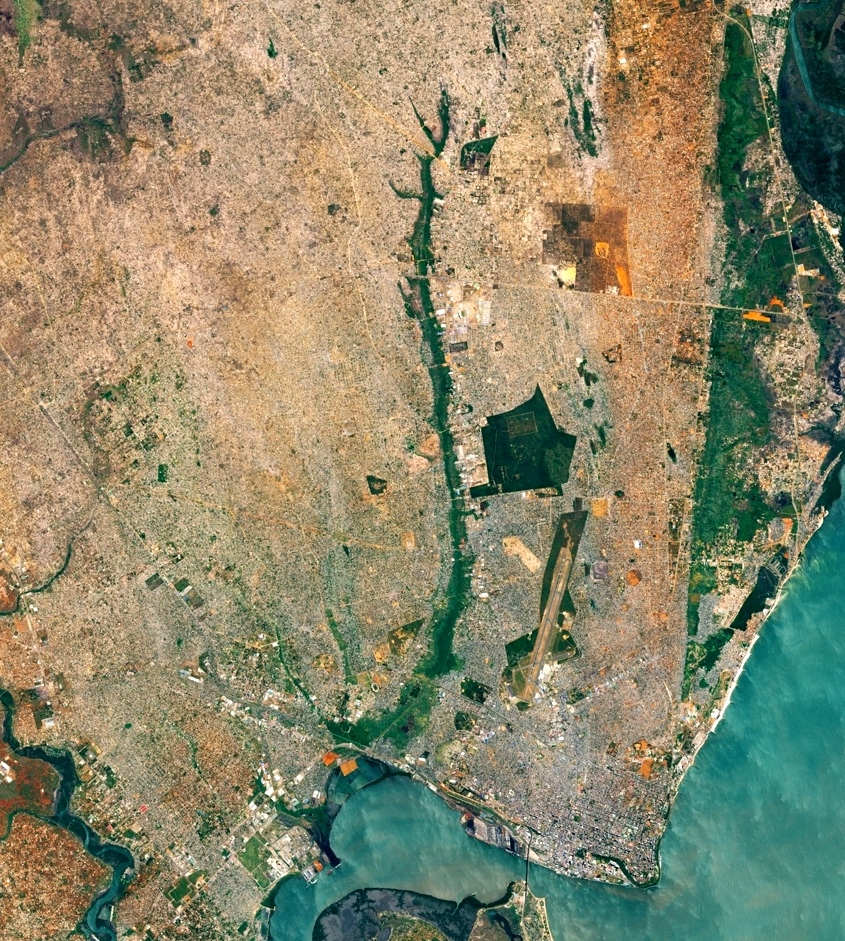
Infulene River imaged by Sentinel-2

The Infulene River (Portuguese: Rio Infulene) is a small river about 20 km long, running from north to south, in the Mozambican province Maputo, flowing into the Estuário do Espírito Santo, serving as a boundary between the municipalities of Maputo and Matola.

It is widely used for irrigating horticultural products in the so-called Green Zones of Maputo City, leading to a considerable increase in salinity and pollution of its waters.
