= Azagaia =

Mozambican rapper (1984–2023)

- Birth name: Edson Amândio Maria Lopes da Luz
- Born: 6 May 1984; Namaacha, Maputo Province, Mozambique
- Died: 9 March 2023 (aged 38); Matola, Maputo, Mozambique
- Genres: Hip-hop
- Occupation: Rapper
- Years active: 2005-2023

Edson Amândio Maria Lopes da Luz (6 May 1984 – 9 March 2023), better known by his stage name Azagaia, was a Mozambican rapper known for his songs about political issues and social justice in Mozambique. In 2014, he was described as "the most influential Mozambican rapper", and his death in 2023 led to widespread marches throughout the country in his honour as well as in support of his political ideas.

== Early life ==
Azagaia was born in Namaacha, Maputo Province, close to Mozambique's border with Eswatini. His mother was a Mozambican merchant, while his father was a teacher originally from Cape Verde. When he was ten, Azagaia moved to Maputo, the capital of Mozambique, where he completed high school before going on to study geology at Eduardo Mondlane University.

== Musical career ==
Azagaia's stage name comes from the Portuguese term for assegai, a pole weapon commonly used throughout Africa before the introduction of firearms to the continent. Azagaia said he saw similarities between himself and the weapon, self-describing himself as "combative" and going "straight to [his] targets".

Azagaia first started performing at the age of 13, when he joined the group Dinastia Bantu alongside MC Escuda; they released one album, Siavuma, in 2005.

On 10 November 2007, Azagaia released his first solo album, Babalaze (the Tsonga word for "hangover"), released by Cotonote Records. The album broke local sales records on the day of its release, and included the singles "Eu não paro" (English: "I don't stop") and "Alternativos" (English: "alternatives"), the latter of which featured the Portuguese political hip-hop artist Valete. Balabaze was noted for its lyrical content, much of which was critical of the Mozambican government, which led to many of its songs not airing on government-owned media channels. The song "As mentiras da verdade" (English: "the lies of the truth") caused controversy due to its political lyrics, and the phrase has become a popular slogan used in protests against the government in Mozambique since its publication. The single "A marcha" (English: "the march"), in which Azagaia called on young Mozambicans to join the struggle against government mismanagement and corruption, broke local sales records for singles.

Between 2007 and 2013, Azagaia released several singles, many of which were overtly political in nature. "Combatentes de fortuna" (English: "fortunate fighters"), released in 2009, was described as being inspired by the ongoing civil unrest in Zimbabwe; despite the song being censored, it became the most-watched music video in the history of Mozambican rap music. The 2010 single "Arriiii" was in response to the arrest of Momade Bachir Sulemane in the United States on drug trafficking charges; Sulemane was a well-known Mozambican entrepreneur, and in the song Azagaia addresses issues of drug trafficking, tax evasion, and murder in Mozambique. In 2012, Azagaia released the song "Emboscada" (English: "ambush"), in which he considers the potential reescalation in the long-running conflict between RENAMO, a militant group, and FRELIMO, the governing party.

In 2013, following three years of production, Azagaia's second solo album, Cubaliwa (the Sena word for "birth") was releasted by Kongoloti Records. The album featured musicians including Stewart Sukuma, Dama do Bling, Banda Likuti, Ras Haitrm, Júlia Duarte, and MCK. Azagaia commented that while Babalaze had focused on the ills of politicians, Cubaliwa addressed the responsibilities of citizens for causing change. Azagaia promoted the album by embarking on the Bem-vindos ao Cubaliwa tour, performing with the band Os Cortadores de Lenha.

In May 2016, following a period of absence due to health issues, Azagaia made his public performance in two years when he performed a concert at Coconuts in Maputo.

== Controversies ==
Until 2013, Azagaia was a member of the Democratic Movement of Mozambique; he left the party to preserve his "independence" as a musician.

Following a period of civil arrest in February 2008, Azagaia released the song "Povo no poder" (English: "people in power"); the song was controversial, and led to him receiving a subpoena to appear before the Attorney General over allegations of "attacking the security of the state". "Povo no poder" has gone on to be a staple song of the protestors against the Mozambican government, notably at the 2010 Mozambican protests.

In 2011, Azagaia, along with his producer Miguel Sherba, were arrested after being found with four grams of cannabis in their possession. After refusing to pay a bribe to the police, Azagaia and Sherba were detained for two days, and their arrest on drug charges was widely published in the Mozambican press. Sherba subsequently accused the arrest of being politically motivated to tarnish Azagaia's public image.

In a June 2014 interview with TV Miramar, Azagaia confirmed he had recently been arrested for a second time, again for cannabis possession; he justified his use of it as being to treat symptoms of epilepsy. During the interview, the broadcast to the channel was cut. Several days later, Azagaia published a Facebook post in which he said due to fears for his family's wellbeing, he would be quitting his music career and returning to Namaacha. He also apologised for normalising cannabis use to young children.

== Health issues and death ==
In 2014, Azagaia announced he had been diagnosed with a brain tumour, and started an internet fundraiser, "Help Azagaia", which ultimately raised 79,020 MT to fund tumour removal surgery. In October 2014, Azagaia travelled to India, where the tumour was successfully removed.

On 9 March 2023, Azagaia died at his home in Maputo due to complications linked to epilepsy. He was 38.

== Funeral and subsequent protests ==
On 14 March 2023, Azagaia's funeral took place at Maputo City Hall. Following the service, when the funeral procession was travelling towards Michafutene cemetery for the burial, armed riot police blocked a road near the Palácio da Ponta Vermelha, the residence of the President of Mozambique, that the procession was due to pass. The procession were chanting popular Azagaia songs, including "Povo no poder" and "Vampiros" (English: "Vampires"), in which Azagaia had compared corrupt leaders to vampires. The police redirected the procession before using teargas to disperse the crowd. The police's response was controversial, with Human Rights Watch raising concerns that unnecessary force had been used to disperse a peaceful crowd. The Mozambican government did not explicitly comment on this, though Eldevina Materula, the Minister of Culture and Tourism, did release a statement saying that "Mozambican music and culture are in mourning" in response to Azagaia's death.

On 17 March 2023, it was announced that marches in honour of Azagaia, as well as in protest against the treatment of mourners at his funeral, would be held in cities across all eleven of Mozambique's provinces. Local police refused to authorise a demonstration in Cabo Delgado Province, citing an ongoing Islamist insurgency there. On 18 March 2023, police fired tear gas and rubber bullets at protestors preparing to start an authorised march in Maputo; the march was ultimately prevented from going ahead, and at least two people were injured when a tear gas canister landed in a private residence. 22 protestors were arrested in Maputo, as well as 10 in Beira, where protestors were similarly given authorisation to march, only to be prevented from doing so by armed police officers.

== Legacy ==
On 6 April 2023, a concert honouring Azagaia was held in Lisbon, Portugal. The concert, curated by Azagaia's collaborator Valete, included performances by Sérgio Godinho and Paulo Flores.

In October 2023, during public demonstrations triggered by the 2023 local election results, the RENAMO mayoral candidate, Venâncio Mondlane, led a march in Maputo, chanting "povo no poder", in reference to Azagaia's song.

In the aftermath of the disputed 2024 Mozambican general election, “Povo no Poder" was prominently played during protests.
