= Namaacha Wind Power Station =

Wind Farm in Mozambique

- Location of Namaacha Wind Power Station in Mozambique
- Country: Mozambique
- Location: Namaacha, Namaacha District, Maputo Province
- Coordinates: 25°58′20″S 32°02′51″E
- Status: Under construction
- Commission date: 2023 Expected
- Construction cost: US$280 million (€234 million)
- Owner: EleQtra Mozambique Limited

Thermal power station
- Primary fuel: Wind power

Power generation
- Nameplate capacity: 120 megawatts (160,000 hp)

The Namaacha Wind Power Station, is a 120 megawatts (160,000 hp) wind-powered electricity power station under construction in Mozambique. It is the first grid-ready wind energy infrastructure in the country. It is under development by EleQtra Mozambique Limited, a subsidiary of the American independent power producer, EleQtra. The power station will be developed in two phases of 60 megawatts each. The estimated construction budget is US$280 million (approx. €234 million). The energy generated here will be sold directly to Electricidade de Moçambique, the Mozambican electric utility company, under a long-term power purchase agreement.

== Location ==
The power station is located near the town of Namaacha, in Namaacha District, in Maputo Province, in the southwestern part of the country, adjacent to the international border with Eswatini. This is approximately 69 kilometres (43 mi) west of the city of Matola, the capital of Maputo Province. This is about 79 kilometres (49 mi), by road, west of Maputo, the capital and largest city in the country.

== Overview ==
In 2018, the Mozambican Energy Fund (FUNAE), awarded the development rights of this power station to EleQtra. The power station is the first large-scale grid-ready wind farm in the country. The energy generated at this wind farm will be relayed via high voltage transmission wires to an EDM substation at Boane, Mozambique, where the energy will be absorbed into the national electricity grid. Boane is located approximately 45 kilometres (28 mi), by road, east of Namaacha.

== Construction and financing ==
The estimated US$280 million construction bill will be met by EleQtra. The United States Trade and Development Agency (USTDA), granted funding to EleQtra to finance a feasibility study for this wind farm.

Construction started in late 2020 and is expected to conclude in late 2023. Construction is expected to create an estimated 700 jobs, the majority of them Mozambican.

== See also ==
- List of power stations in Mozambique
