= Theodorico de Sacadura Botte =

- Administrator of Marracuene, Administrator of Magude
- Full name: Theodorico César de Sande Pacheco de Sacadura Botte
- Born: 31 October 1902; Quinta da Bica, Kingdom of Portugal
- Died: 18 November 1987 (aged 85); Maputo, Mozambique
- Buried: Maputo, Mozambique
- Noble family: Sacadura Botte
- Occupation: Colonial Administrator, Entrepreneur, Businessman

Theodorico César de Sande Pacheco de Sacadura Botte (Quinta da Bica, Portugal, 31 October 1902 - Maputo, Mozambique, 18 November 1987), commonly known as Theodorico de Sacadura Botte, was a Portuguese colonial administrator and entrepreneur.

Born into a Portuguese rural aristocratic family, Sacadura Botte left Lisbon and moved to the Portuguese African Overseas during the Portuguese State's takeover of colonial administration from the British-owned private companies to which it was formerly commissioned. After many years as a colonial officer, and having been administrator of two different districts, as well as Chief of Cabinet of the Governor of Mozambique, he became an entrepreneur and businessman, with interests in international trade, real estate, horticulture and agriculture.

After the fall of the Portuguese Estado Novo regime, Mozambique was granted independence, which was followed by a wave of nationalization of Portuguese-owned properties and businesses, as well as, in many cases, persecution of Portuguese nationals. Although Sacadura Botte saw most of his property confiscated and his family and friends exiled, he remained in Mozambique and acknowledged the new regime, thus earning the respect of the new leaders. This has also been attributed to the fact that he was considered a just and kind governor by the people under his rule during both his tenure as district administrator.

In his final years, he wrote a memoir, titled "Memórias e Autobiografia: 24 anos em Portugal e 60 em Africa" (Memoirs and Autobiography: 24 years in Portugal and 60 in Africa), which told his life story and is considered a great instrument of insight into the final years of the Portuguese Overseas Empire, as well as an interesting account of most of the 20th century through the eyes of a member of the last generation of Portuguese colonialists.

Theodorico de Sacadura Botte died in Maputo, the capital of Mozambique, on 18 November 1987, aged 85.

== Early life and departure to Africa ==
Sacadura Botte was born on 31 October 1902 at the family manor of Quinta da Bica, in Seia, Portugal, near Serra da Estrela. He was the fifth and last son of João Pacheco de Sacadura Botte, 8th Lord of Quinta da Bica, and Maria da Ascenção Mendes de Oliva. His father was a magistrate, landowner and winemaker, as well as a monarchist politician and candidate for the Beira region. As a young boy, Theodorico lived through the fall of the Portuguese Monarchy, much to the dismay of his traditional, Catholic and monarchist family.

He started his studies in Coimbra, and then studied Business and Economical Sciences, at the Instituto Superior de Comércio in Lisbon. After finishing his studies, he considered the diplomatic career, but could not follow this idea due to the republican nature of the Portuguese regime at the time, with which he profoundly disagreed. For the following two years, he ran the agricultural production of his father's estate. Afterwards, and giving up the idea of joining the diplomatic corps, he was invited by his good friend José de Moura Forjaz de Gusmão, then manager of the “Sociedade Colonial de Tabacos”, the Portuguese Colonial Tobacco Society, to move to Africa on a three-year commission, as a bookkeeper for that same company. Accepting the invitation, and against his family's wishes, Sacadura Botte left for the Portuguese colony of São Tomé and Príncipe, boarding the Angola steamship, in Lisbon, on 31 May 1926.

It was also during his early years that Sacadura Botte developed many of the interests that would accompany him through life. He discovered his favorite sports, horse-riding and hunting, early in life, being initiated into both in his family's estate. He also had his first close contact with silviculture, which went on to become a later years passion, in one of his maternal family's estates, Quinta do Outeiro, where his maternal grandfather, Theodorico César Mendes de Oliva, created a well known botanical garden known as Bussaquinho, because of its similarity to the famous Bussaco forest.

== Arrival in Africa and the tobacco years ==
After stops in Madeira, the Canary Islands, Portuguese São Tomé and Príncipe and Luanda, Sacadura Botte finally arrived in Lourenço Marques, capital of the Portuguese overseas province of Mozambique, in late June 1926. He took over his job as bookkeeper for the Lourenço Marques factory of the Colonial Tobacco Society, and moved into the Cardoso Hotel, where he lived during his first tenure in Mozambique.

After little over two years in Mozambique, Sacadura Botte was invited to fill in for the manager of the Luanda factory of the same company, Pedro de Figueiredo e Lemos, who was leaving for Portugal for a year. After taking the offer, he moved to Luanda, where he lived in the manager's suite on the factory premises. After Figueiredo e Lemos' return from Portugal, Sacadura Botte travelled to São Tomé for a month, where he inspected the many tobacco plantations on that island that supplied the Colonial Tobacco Society. After finishing the inspection, and upon arriving in Lourenço Marques, he took over as manager of the Lourenço Marques factory, this time filling in for José de Moura Forjaz de Gusmão, who was leaving for Portugal, also for a year.

Little before Moura Forjaz de Gusmão's return, Sacadura Botte decided to leave the tobacco industry for a career in public administration. Although he was highly regarded within the Tobacco Society, both Figueiredo e Lemos and Moura Forjaz de Gusmão were young and bound to stay on as managers for a long time, and Sacadura Botte felt he should move beyond his bookkeeper position, so he decided to try a different career.

During his first years in Africa, Sacadura Botte often indulged in the pleasures of game hunting, one of his favourite sports. During his many years in Africa, he hunted alongside famous hunters like German aristocrat Baron Werner von Alvensleben, as well as many figures of the Portuguese society of that time: future Governor of Angola Manuel de Gusmão de Mascarenhas Gaivão and his brother José Diogo Mascarenhas Gaivão, future Minister of Public Works José Frederico Ulrich, industrialist Hermínio Madeira Leitão (whose daughter Isabel would become Sacadura Botte's daughter-in-law), and businessman Maximiano Cotta, among many others.

== District administrator: Magude ==
Throughout the 19th century, the colonization of many of Portugal's overseas provinces was concessioned to private companies, due to Portugal's lack of funds to pursue the development of these areas. One of said companies was the Niassa Company, whose concession covered the regions of Niassa and Cabo Delgado, among others in the Portuguese East Africa. On 27 October 1929 the Niassa Company's concession expired, and the Portuguese Government refused to grant an extension. This refusal was due to the Ditadura Nacional regime's belief that the state should head colonization.

In this wave of state takeover of colonial administration, many formerly concessioned districts were now in need of an administrator. The Governor of Mozambique opened a selection process to choose who would occupy these positions. Theodorico de Sacadura Botte, having, as earlier stated, decided to try a different career in which he could have a greater degree of autonomy, applied. He was one of the three chosen candidates, alongside Lieutenants Ribeiro da Silva and Pinto da Fonseca, and chose to administrate the district of Magude.

In his first tenure as District Administrator of Magude, he showed many of the traits that would accompany him throughout his career as a colonial administration. His strong opposition to the forced labour system known as chibalo, as well as his strong defense of the native people and cooperation with local tribes gained enormous respect from the Mozambican population. This was at a time in which natives were used as cheap labour for many of the landowners, and were mostly at their mercy. Although Sacadura Botte faced some opposition at first, soon his uncompromising stand and firm ideals prevailed.

During his time as district administrator, he often went on hunting and riding expeditions, as he so much enjoyed, having at one point lead the hunting expedition devised to obtain a buffalo worthy of figuring in Portugal's exposition in the Exposition Universelle in Paris.

During a stay at a country club he met Incomati Sugar Estates manager Thomas Newman and his wife Leila. They agreed to play a tennis doubles match, and Sacadura Botte was paired with Leila Newman's sister Sheila May Younger. After this first encounter, Sacadura Botte began courting Sheila May, and after her conversion to Catholicism, they were eventually married by Father Alfredo Corrêa de Lima, in Magude. Sheila was the youngest daughter of then already deceased William Douglas Younger, of the renown Younger family, of Clackmannanshire, Scotland, and his Australian-born British wife, Leila May.

During his term in Magude, Sacadura Botte earned the respect of the locals through his reputation for being a just and fair administrator. His often unorthodox methods in fighting inequality and his refusal to accommodate existing lobbies, especially those which attempted to corrupt him or his officials, garnered him some enemies during that period. Once, upon realizing that the Portuguese businessmen were buying cattle from the locals at a price much lower than its worth, Sacadura Botte forbade any cattle from being sold or bought until fair prices were paid. After some time being unable to buy cattle, the businessmen accepted the fair prices proposed by Sacadura Botte and commerce resumed as usual.

== In literature ==
Sacadura Botte wrote a three-volume set of memoirs, called "Memórias e Autobiografia", which have been considered an insightful look at the final years of the Portuguese Colonial Empire through the eyes of one of its last colonialists, with "gems of information (...) much of which is unavailable elsewhere".

The first volume of the memoirs, which deals closely with Sacadura Botte's early recollections on his family and upbringing, is widely quoted in "Do morgadio à divisão igualitária dos bens: extinção do morgadio e estratégias de perpetuação do poder familiar", a reference academic work on the strategies adopted by the Portuguese regional nobility to perpetuate their families' power beyond the end of the Portuguese Absolutist Regime and, subsequently, the Portuguese monarchy itself.

He was also the inspiration for a poem, titled simply T.S.B., written by Portuguese ambassador to Mozambique José Cutileiro, in which he is compared to Prospero, from Shakespeare's The Tempest, and the new Mozambican regime to Caliban, from the same play.

T.S.B.

Today I have met Prospero.
Living in an island under Caliban's rule.
He opted out but he did not go
And treads the ground and breathes the air with no
Allegiance of a subject to the fool

Fifty or more years ago
He came to settle and has not left since.
The lifetime of a Master. Winds that blow
Deep-rooted trees away shall never throw
Him kneeling in front of the new Prince.

Here he'll die. A vow
To keep forever great that smallness whence he came
That sold him out and sent me now
To honour Caliban. He greets me with a bow
The pride of which redeems the shame of a nation.

Namacha, 1980

== Personal life ==
On 7 February 1932, at the Missão de São Jerónimo, in the province of Magude, Sacadura Botte married Sheila May Younger (12 April 1912 – 11 July 1998). A scion of the Scottish Younger brewing family, Sheila was a second cousin once removed of the 1st Lord Younger of Leckie and Lord Blanesburgh, a third cousin of Sir William McEwan Younger, 1st Baronet and Sir James Paton Younger, a third cousin once removed of the 14th Lord Reay and Sir David Younger KVCO, and a third cousin twice removed of the 1st Lord Airedale.

They had one son, João Pacheco de Sacadura Botte (25 December 1932, Johannesburg - 17 May 2007, Maputo), who married and had issue.
