= Metropolitan Maputo =

Metropolitan Maputo is the name for the broader Maputo-Matola area which includes the districts of Marracuene and the city of Matola in the country of Mozambique.

The borders of the metropolitan area are between the borders of the east and the towns of Boane and Matutuíne. The total estimated area is 1,411.8 square kilometers. The most recent population Census in August 2017 has put Metropolitan Maputo at 2,947,967 people.

Administrative division	Area (km²)	Population 2007 Census	Population 2017 Census
Maputo City	347.0	1,094,628	1,101,170
Matola City	367.7	671,556	1,616,267
Marracuene District	697.1	84,975	230,530
Metropolitan area	1,411.8	1,851,159	2,947,967
