= Magude =

Magude may refer to:

- Magude District, Maputo Province, Mozambique
- Magude, Maputo Province, the seat of Magude District
