= Chibalo =

Chibalo was the system of debt bondage or forced labour in the Ultramar Português (the Portuguese overseas provinces in Africa and Asia), most notably in Portuguese Angola and Portuguese Mozambique (unlike most other European overseas possessions of the 20th century, the Portuguese ones were not considered colonies, but full-fledged provinces of Portugal proper).

In 1869 Portugal officially abolished slavery, but in practice, it continued nonetheless. Chibalo was used to build the infrastructure of the African provinces, as only Portuguese settlers and assimilados received an education, making them exempt from this forced labour.

== Chibalo system ==
Under the Estado Novo regime of António de Oliveira Salazar, chibalo was used in Mozambique to grow cotton for Portugal, build roads, and serve Portuguese settlers. The system was enforced by physical and sexual violence against black Africans The Niassa Company is an example of the kind of companies that could flourish since they had access to an unpaid labour force. Foreign investment in the Portuguese overseas provinces was outlawed so that Portugal would benefit directly. Entire families had to work in the cotton fields, replacing food production, leading to hunger and malnourishment.

Chibalo outlasted slavery in the Portuguese Empire. Indigenous peoples in Mozambique, however, resisted chibalo throughout the period of Portuguese domination into the independence struggle. It also faced strong opposition since the late 19th century from Portuguese colonialists and businessmen, notably Theodorico de Sacadura Botte in the provinces of Marracuene and Magude, in Portuguese Mozambique.

== See also ==
- Prazo
- Kafala, similar practice used in Arab states.
