= Moamba District =

Coordinates: 25.604°S 32.246°E

Moamba
- District
- Moamba District on the map of Mozambique
- Country: Mozambique
- Province: Maputo
- Capital: Moamba

Area
  - Total: 4,628 km^{2} (1,787 sq mi)

Population (2007 census)
  - Total: 56,335
  - Density: 12.17/km^{2} (31.53/sq mi)

Moamba District is a district of Maputo Province in southern Mozambique. Its main town is Moamba. The district is located in the western part of the province, and borders with Magude District in the north, Manhiça and Marracuene Districts in the east, the city of Matola in the southeast, Boane District and Namaacha District in the south, and with Mpumalanga Province of South Africa, in the west. The area of the district is 4,628 square kilometres (1,787 mi^{2}). It has a population of 56,335 as of 2007.

== Geography ==
The Incomati River crosses the district from west to east. There are a number of seasonal rivers as well, which only flow during the rainy season.

The climate is subtropical dry, with the annual rainfall ranging between 580 millimetres (23 in) and 590 millimetres (23 in).

== History ==
The area was populated by Ronga people who are a subgroup of Tsonga people and divided between local chiefs. Since 1833, the area was occupied by the Portuguese.

== Demographics ==
As of 2005, 40% of the population of the district was younger than 15 years. 49% of the population spoke Portuguese. The most common mothertongue among the population was Xichangana. 55% were analphabetic, mostly women.

== Administrative divisions ==
The district is divided into four postos, Moamba (one locality), Ressano Garcia (one locality), Pessene (three localities), and Sábiè (five localities).

== Economy ==
9% of the households in the district have access to electricity.

=== Agriculture ===
In the district, there are 10,000 farms which have on average 1.3 hectares (0.0050 mi^{2}) of land. The main agricultural products are corn, cassava, cowpea, peanut, and sweet potato.

=== Transportation ===
There is a road network in the district, which includes 119 kilometres (74 mi) of the national road EN4, running between Maputo and Ressano Garcia, as well as secondary roads. A railway between Maputo and Ressano Garcia runs through Moamba; another railway line, between Moamba and Xinavane, is not in operation.
