= Boane District =

Coordinates: 26.047°S 32.334°E

Boane
- District
- Boane District on the map of Mozambique
- Country: Mozambique
- Province: Maputo
- Capital: Boane

Area
  - Total: 815 km^{2} (315 sq mi)

Population (2007 census)
  - Total: 98,964
  - Density: 121/km^{2} (314/sq mi)

Boane District is a district of Maputo Province in southern Mozambique. The principal town is Boane. The district is located in the center of the province, and borders with Moamba District in the north, the city of Matola in the northeast, Matutuíne District in the south, and with Namaacha District in the west. In the east, it is bounded by the Indian Ocean. The area of the district is 815 square kilometres (315 mi^{2}). It has a population of 98,964 as of 2007.

== Geography ==
The principal rivers in the district are the Umbeluzi River with the tributaries, the Tembe River and the Matola River.

The climate is subtropical humid, with the annual rainfall being 752 millimetres (29.6 in), of which 564 millimetres (22.2 in) fall during the rainy season.

== History ==
The area was administered by the Portuguese since 1895, and was subordinated to Matola.

== Demographics ==
As of 2005, 42% of the population of the district was younger than 15 years. 64% of the population spoke Portuguese. The most common mothertongue among the population was Xichangana. 47% were analphabetic, mostly women.

== Administrative divisions ==
The district is divided into two postos, Boane (three localities) and Matola Rio (one locality).

== Economy ==
7% of the households in the district have access to electricity.

=== Agriculture ===
In the district, there are 14,000 farms which have on average 0.8 hectares (0.0031 mi^{2}) of land. The main agricultural products are corn, cassava, cowpea, peanut, and sweet potato.

=== Transportation ===
There is a road network in the district which includes a stretch of national roads EN2 (connecting Boane and Namaacha) and EN3 (connecting Boane and Catuane), as well as secondary roads.

Boane is served by a railway station on the Goba railway, which connects with the city of Goba (west) and Matola (east).
