= House of Sacadura Botte =

House of Sacadura Botte Formerly House of Gomes de Aguiar
- Noble family
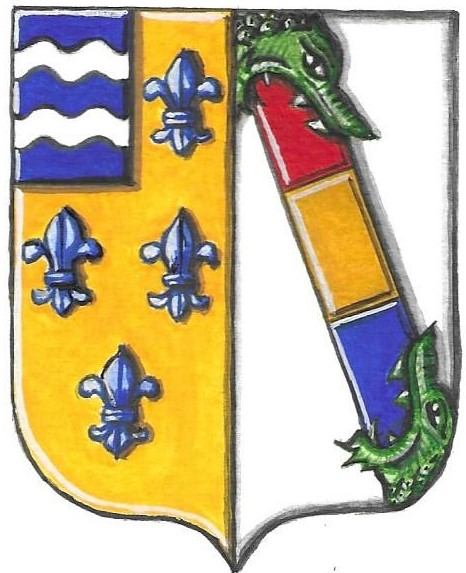
- Parent family: Spanish House of Sacadura Botte (enatic)
- Country: Kingdom of Portugal; Portuguese Republic
- Founded: 1653
- Founder: Mateus Gomes de Aguiar
- Current head: João Miguel Coutinho de Sacadura Botte
- Titles: Hereditary Noblemen of the Royal Chamber (1653); Hereditary Knights of the Royal Household (1697)
- Distinctions: Knights of Christ; Knights of Santiago; Officers of the Holy Inquisition
- Estates: Quinta de São Simão da Aguieira (Nelas); Quinta da Bica (Seia); Herdade da Várzea (Ponte de Sor); Quinta de Santa Eufémia de Tibaldinho (Mangualde); Quinta da Alfocheira (Lousã); Palácio Sacadura Botte (Coimbra)
- Cadet branches: List: Pereira de Almeida e Vasconcelos (extinct); Macedo Sottomayor e Castro (extinct); Sacadura Botte Côrte-Real, of Aguieira; Sacadura Botte, of Quinta da Bica, dit Viscounts of Sardoal; Sacadura Botte, of Lousã (extinct)

The House of Sacadura Botte is an extant Portuguese noble family, patrilineally descended from Mateus Gomes de Aguiar, a Portuguese Knight of Santiago who was nobilitated in 1653 for his military service in Bahia during the Dutch–Portuguese War.

The House of Sacadura Botte as it exists today originated from the marriage in 1686 of João Baptista de Aguiar e Azevedo, son and heir of Mateus Gomes de Aguiar, and D. Maria de Proença de Azevedo Pacheco de Sacadura Botte, sister and heiress of Manuel Pacheco de Sacadura Botte, 8th Lord of Alameda and 6th of Peña Parda, and head of Spanish House of Sacadura Botte. Upon the latter's death without issue, the members of the Portuguese House of Sacadura Botte matrilineally inherited the surnames, arms, and patrimonial possessions of the extinct Spanish House of Sacadura Botte.

The Spanish House of Sacadura Botte, in turn, had originated from the 16th century marriage of a member of the House of Botte, which took its name from El Botte, a dehesa on which its former seat of Castle of Belvís de Monroy is built; and the female heir of a cadet branch of the House of Alvarado, which was originally called House of Sacadura after the village of Secadura in which its seat, the Tower of Alvarado, was located.

== The House of Gomes de Aguiar ==
Mateus Gomes de Aguiar was born in 1628, and at age 20 he sailed to Bahia, Brazil, under the orders of the 2nd Count of Castelo Melhor, who was Governor of Brazil from 1650 to 1654. During his stay in Bahia, he took part in the Dutch–Portuguese War and rose to prominence in a naval battle against the Dutch in 1651. As a result, and at the Count of Castelo Melhor's behest, he was elevated to the nobility in 1653.

His eldest son, João Baptista de Aguiar e Azevedo, married thrice, to three heiresses from different families. He had male issue from all three of his wives, but the heirs from each of these marriages adopted their matrilineal surnames and arms in order to succeed in the patrimonial possessions of their corresponding mothers' families. Upon the extinction in the male line of all branches other than those descending from Aguiar e Azevedo's marriage to D. Maria de Proença de Azevedo Pacheco de Sacadura Botte, the Sacadura Botte branch became the only agnatic line, and the name Gomes de Aguiar fell into disuse.

In an anecdotal testament to the Portuguese Empire's longevity and extent, Mateus Gomes de Aguiar and his agnatic descendants served Portugal for over four centuries across four continents. Notably:

- His grandson José Pereira de Vasconcelos, Captain-at-Sea, served and died in the Portuguese State of India;
- His great-grandson Dom José de Macedo Sottomayor e Castro, Captain of Dragoons, served and died in São Paulo, Brazil;
- His patrilineal 5th-great-grandson José da Costa Pereira Estaço de Sacadura Botte Côrte-Real, Artillery Colonel, served in the French Campaigns during World War I; and
- His patrilineal 5th-great-grandson Theodorico de Sacadura Botte was a colonial administrator in Mozambique.

== Legacy ==
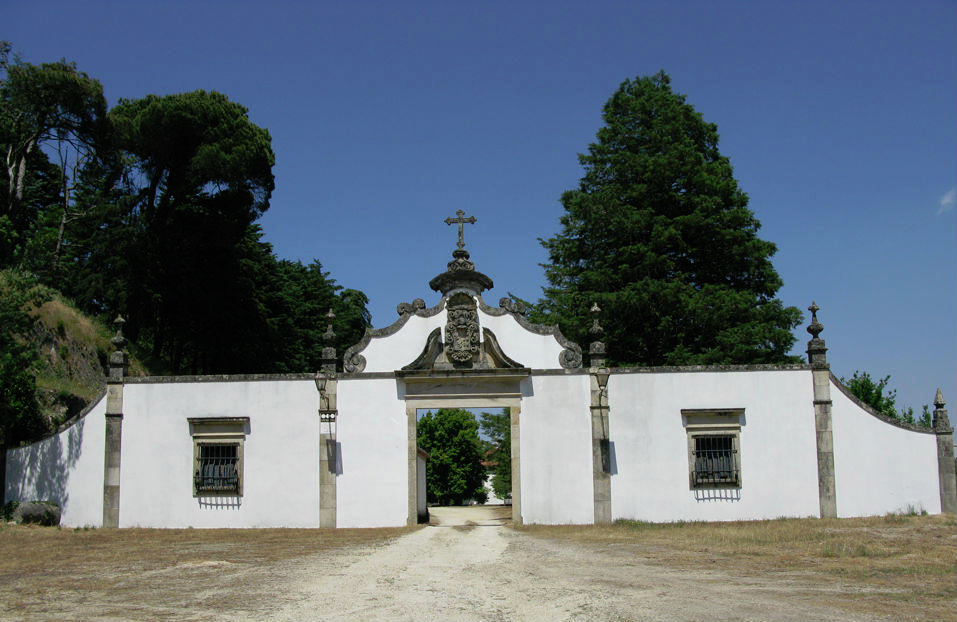
Main gate of Quinta da Bica

A number of roads in the Beira Region are named after the House of Sacadura Botte or its members, such as the "Rua Sacadura Botte" and "Beco Sacadura Botte" (both located in the village of Aguieira), the "Rua Dr. José Maria de Sacadura Botte" and another "Beco Sacadura Botte" (both located in the village of Santa Comba), the "Ponte Sacadura Botte" and "Avenida José de Sacadura Botte" (both in the village of Arrifana), or a second "Rua Sacadura Botte" (this one located in the village of Tramaga).

The 16th century Quinta de São Simão da Aguieira, seat of the House of Sacadura Botte for the better part of three centuries, was sold at the end of the 20th century and is now a monument bearing the name "Sacadura Botte Manor".

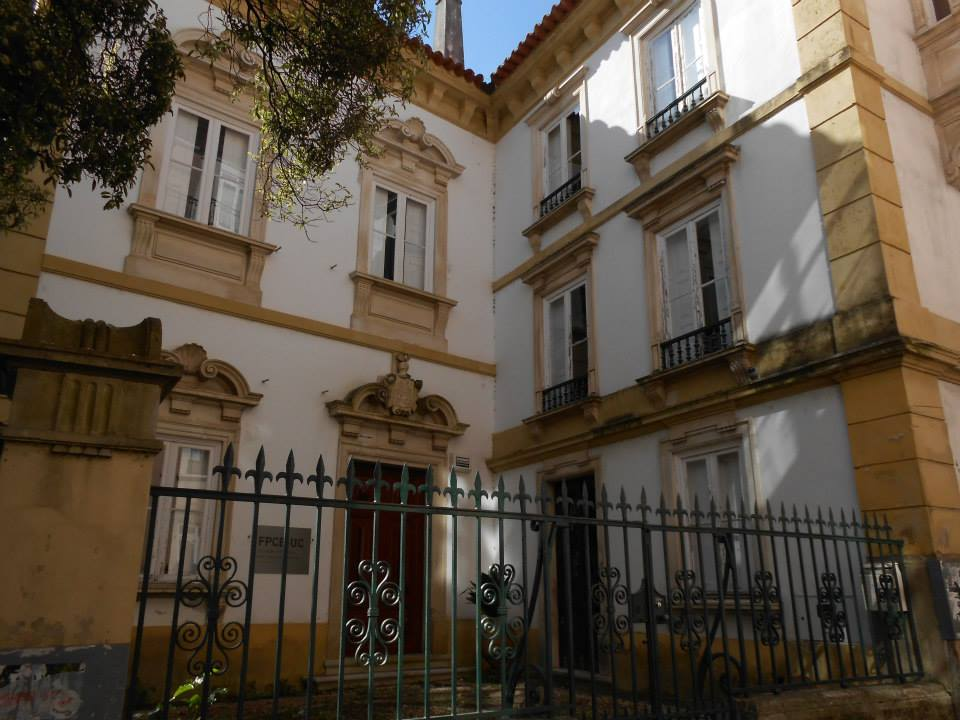
Sacadura Botte Palace

Likewise, the Quinta da Bica, seat of the cadet branch of the House of Sacadura Botte known as the Viscounts of Sardoal, is a Grade 2 Listed Building (Imóvel de Interesse Público), and is the only residential listed building in the Seia region which remains in the hands of the original family.

In Coimbra, the Sacadura Botte name is still present in the eponymous palace, which was inhabited by members of the family until 1972, when it was ceded to the University of Coimbra. The Sacadura Botte Palace formerly housed the National Science and Technology Museum, and currently serves as the University's School of Psychology and Education Science.

== Notable members ==
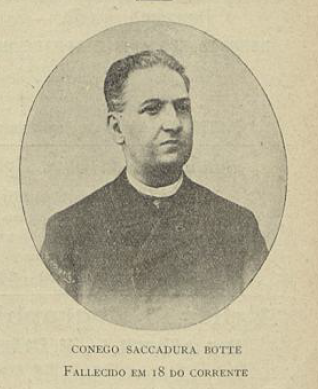
Header of the obituary of the Reverend Canon Carlos de Sacadura Botte

- João de Azevedo Pacheco de Sacadura Botte (1751-1807): notable 18th century desembargador, involved in many of the most contentious legal cases of his time.
- Ana Cândida de Sacadura Botte (1795): Abbess of the Monastery of Santa Clara of Coimbra.
- João de Sande de Sacadura Botte Côrte-Real (1812–1887): one of the foremost Portuguese viticulturists of the 19th century, his work was instrumental to the creation and popularization of the Dão Wine Region.
- Júlio César de Sande Sacadura Botte (1839-1899): Professor and Dean of the Faculty of Medicine of the University of Coimbra.
- Carlos Eduardo de Sande Sacadura Botte (1840-1903): Governor of the Diocese of Leiria (1873-1882); and later Canon (1886), Archdeacon (1890), and Cantor (1895) of the Patriarchate of Lisbon.
- José da Costa Pereira Estaço de Sande de Sacadura Botte Côrte-Real CavTE GCA (1896-1961): Artillery Colonel and chief of staff of the Lisbon Army during World War I.
- José Maria da Costa Pereira Pacheco de Sacadura Botte ComC ComA (1898-1962): Medical Doctor and Member of Parliament.
- Theodorico César de Sande Pacheco de Sacadura Botte (1902-1987): businessman, colonial administrator, and memoirist.
- Maria Madalena Frazão de Sacadura Botte (1949-): distinguished equestrian, founder and former Chair of the Portuguese Combined Driving Association, the first woman to be Master of Foxhounds of a Portuguese fox hunting club (Equipagem de Santo Huberto), and recipient of the Prémio Femina in 2024.
- Margarida Sacadura Botte (1960-): Professor of the Department of Chemistry and Biochemistry of the University of Lisbon.
