= Lina Magaia =

Mozambican writer (1945– 2011)

Lina Júlia Francisco Magaia (1945 – June 27, 2011) was a Mozambican writer, journalist and veteran of the war for the independence of Mozambique. She was a woman of many facets, working in writing, film, rural development, and as a soldier during the liberation of the country from colonial rule.

== Biography ==
Lina Magaia was born in Maputo in 1945. While still at school she joined the Mozambican Liberation Front and was imprisoned for three months for political activities. She was one of the first Mozambican women to receive a scholarship to study abroad, earning a BSc degree from the University of Lisbon; she subsequently went to Tanzania for military training and in 1975 became a member of the FRELIMO liberation army.

In 1980, she was involved with the "Green Zones" project of the Organization of Mozambican Women, which aimed to supply food to the urban areas, and two years later she went to Manhiça in Maputo Province, where she became deputy director for the Maragra state sugar farm. In 1986, she became director of agricultural development for Manhiça District, but her work was to come under attack by the militant resistant movement RENAMO during the post-Independence internal conflicts.

She died on 27 June 2011 of cardiovascular disease. She was described by the Mozambican Prime Minister as "a great fighter and highly active citizen who, in the various stages of her life, gave the best of herself to the Mozambican nation".

== Writing ==
Her books Dumba Nengue (1987; published in English as Run For Your Life) and Duplo massacre en Moçambique (1989; Double Massacre in Mozambique) draw on eyewitness accounts from survivors of atrocities in the Mozambican Civil War, and contain gruesome episodes illustrating the savage nature of the war and of the apartheid regime's surrogate force, the RENAMO rebels. A third book, Delehta (1994), set during the war, is part fiction, part documentary. Magaia's final work was Recordacoes da Vovo Marta ("Memories of Grandma Marta"), published in 2011, and based on lengthy interviews with one of Mozambique's oldest women, 99-year-old Marta Mbocota Guebuza, mother of former Mozambican President Armando Guebuza.

== Published works ==
- Dumba Nengue: Historias Trágicas do Banditismo (1987).
  - Run for Your Life: Peasant tales of tragedy in Mozambique; English-language translation by Michael Wolfers, historical introduction by Allen Isaacman (Africa World Press, 1988). ISBN 0-86543-074-8 (pbk); ISBN 0-86543-073-X
- Duplo massacre en Moçambique: Histórias trágicas do banditismo – II (1989)
  - Doppio massacro: storie tragiche del banditismo in Mozambico (1990). ISBN 88-267-0093-1
- Delehta: Pulos na vida (1994)
- Memories of Grandma Marta (2011)
