= Magude train disaster =

Train accident

Details
- Date: 27 March 1974
- Location: Magude
- Coordinates: 25°01′23″S 32°38′53″E
- Country: Portuguese Mozambique
- Line: Lourenço Marques-Salisbury
- Operator: Mozambique Railways
- Incident type: Head-on collision, explosion
- Cause: Excessive speed

Statistics
- Trains: 2
- Deaths: 70
- Injured: 200

The Magude train disaster occurred on 27 March 1974 in Magude, Portuguese Mozambique, when a train carrying passengers from Rhodesia collided head-on with a Mozambican freight train, causing an explosion that killed 70 people and injured 200. At the time, it was the worst rail disaster in Mozambique's history.

== Overview ==
In the early morning or evening of 27 March 1974, a southbound train carrying passengers from Rhodesia crashed head-on with a stationary northbound Mozambican freight train that was holding, among other things, petroleum products. The crash occurred in Magude, Portuguese Mozambique, some miles north of the capital, Lourenço Marques (now Maputo). The collision caused the petroleum products aboard the freight train to explode and shower burning oil over several coaches of the passenger train. The extreme heat caused the affected cars to melt, killing the passengers inside. Several passengers from the coaches that were not burning attempted to save some of the victims, but were forced to turn back due to the flames.

On the day of the collision, it was reported that 60 passengers were killed. Several days later, police reported 70 deaths and around 200 injuries. The event was believed to be the worst rail disaster in Mozambique's history, later surpassed by the Tenga rail disaster with 192 deaths. President William Tolbert of Liberia sent his condolences to Mozambican Prime Minister Joaquim Chissano.

== See also ==
- Lists of rail accidents
  - List of rail accidents (1970–79)
- List of explosions
- List of fires
