= Matutuíne District =

Coordinates: 26.344°S 32.675°E

Matutuíne
- District
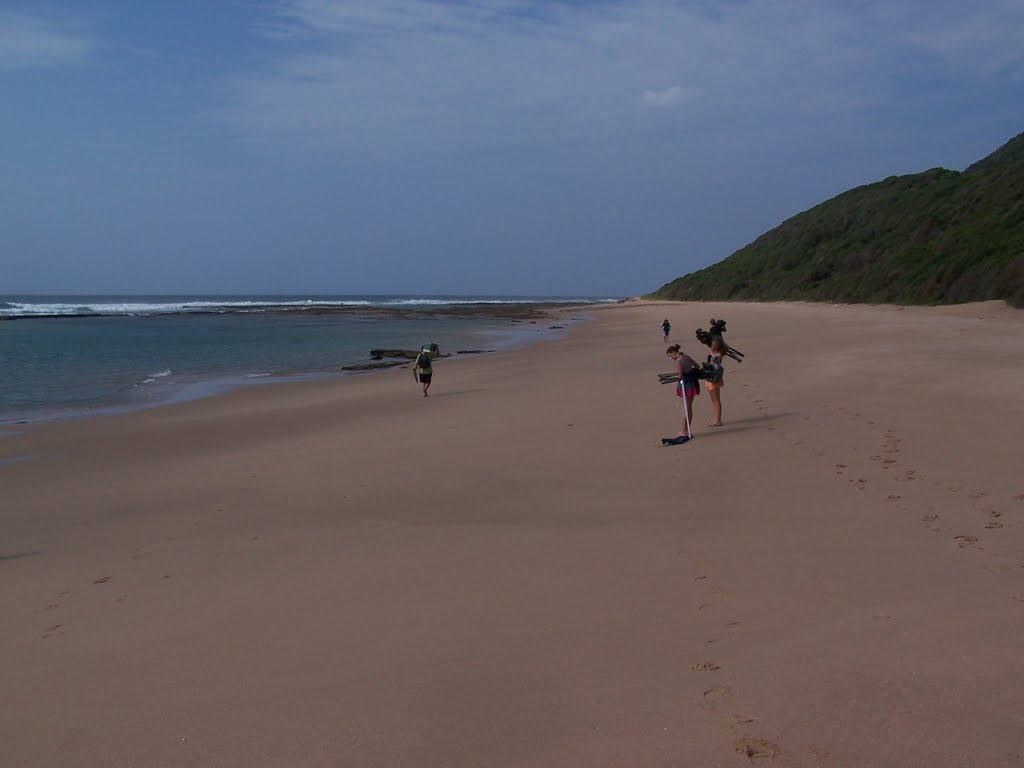
- Matutuíne coast

- Matutuíne District on the map of Mozambique
- Country: Mozambique
- Province: Maputo
- Capital: Bela Vista

Area
  - Total: 5,387 km^{2} (2,080 sq mi)

Population (2007 census)
  - Total: 37,165
  - Density: 6.899/km^{2} (17.87/sq mi)

Matutuíne District is a district of Maputo Province in southern Mozambique. The principal town is Bela Vista. The district is located in the south of the province, and borders with the city of Maputo in the north, the province of KwaZulu-Natal of South Africa in the south, Eswatini in the west, and with Namaacha and Boane Districts in the northwest. In the east, the district is limited by the Indian Ocean. The area of the district is 5,387 square kilometres (2,080 mi^{2}). This is the southernmost district of Mozambique. It has a population of 37,165 as of 2007.

== Geography ==
The principal rivers in the district are the Maputo River and the Tembe River. There are several lakes in the district.

The climate is subtropical, with the annual rainfall being around 1,000 millimetres (39 in) at the coast and 600 millimetres (24 in) in the interior.

== History ==
The area has been recorded in the 17th century as populated by Machavane people. In the 18th century it was conquered by a local chief Maputsu. By the 18th century, the Mashabane (or Maxabane) chiefdom emerged as a significant player in the region, having splintered from the Nyaka Kingdom. Mashabane controlled areas overlapping with Matutuíne and its surroundings, adding to the constellation of Tsonga people chiefdoms noted by Portuguese and Dutch observers, alongside Matsolo and Mabota. This period of relative stability was disrupted in the early 19th century during the M’pfekani (Mfecane), a wave of upheaval triggered by Nguni expansion. In the 1820s, Soshangane, a Ndwandwe Nguni general, arrived in Tsongaland. Instead of returning, he established the Gaza Empire, incorporating many Tsonga communities, including those in Matutuíne. Subsequently, the Portuguese took over the administration.

In the 1940s, the district was divided into three postos, in the 1960s one more was added.

== Demographics ==
As of 2005, 39% of the population of the district was younger than 15 years. 38% of the population spoke Portuguese. The most common mothertongue among the population was Xirhonga, which is part of Tsonga language. 64% were analphabetic, mostly women.

== Administrative divisions ==
The district is divided into five postos, Missevene (four localities, including Bela Vista), Catembe-Nsime (two localities), Catuane (two localities), Machangulo (two localities), and Zitundo (two localities).

== Economy ==
3% of the households in the district have access to electricity.

=== Agriculture ===
In the district, there are 7,000 farms which have on average 0.9 hectares (0.0035 mi^{2}) of land. The main agricultural products are corn, cassava, cowpea, peanut, and sweet potato.

=== Transportation ===
There is a road network in the district 597 kilometres (371 mi) long, which includes stretches of national roads EN3 (80 kilometres (50 mi), connecting Boane and Catuane), EN201 (117 kilometres (73 mi)), EN202 (37 kilometres (23 mi), to Bela Vista), as well as secondary roads.

A new port primarily for the export of coal was approved in 2009.
