= Xinavane =

- Location within Mozambique
- Coordinates: 25°11′53″S 32°52′3″E
- Country: Mozambique
- Provinces: Maputo Province
- District: Manhiça District

Xinavane is a town on the Incomati River, in the Manhiça District of Maputo Province, in Mozambique about 80 kilometres north of Maputo.

== Economy ==
Tongaat Hulett Sugar grows sugarcane and operates a sugar mill at Xinavane. In 2009 the sugar mill completed a major expansion, engineered and managed by PGBI Engineers & Constructors.
