= Magude, Maputo Province =

Magude
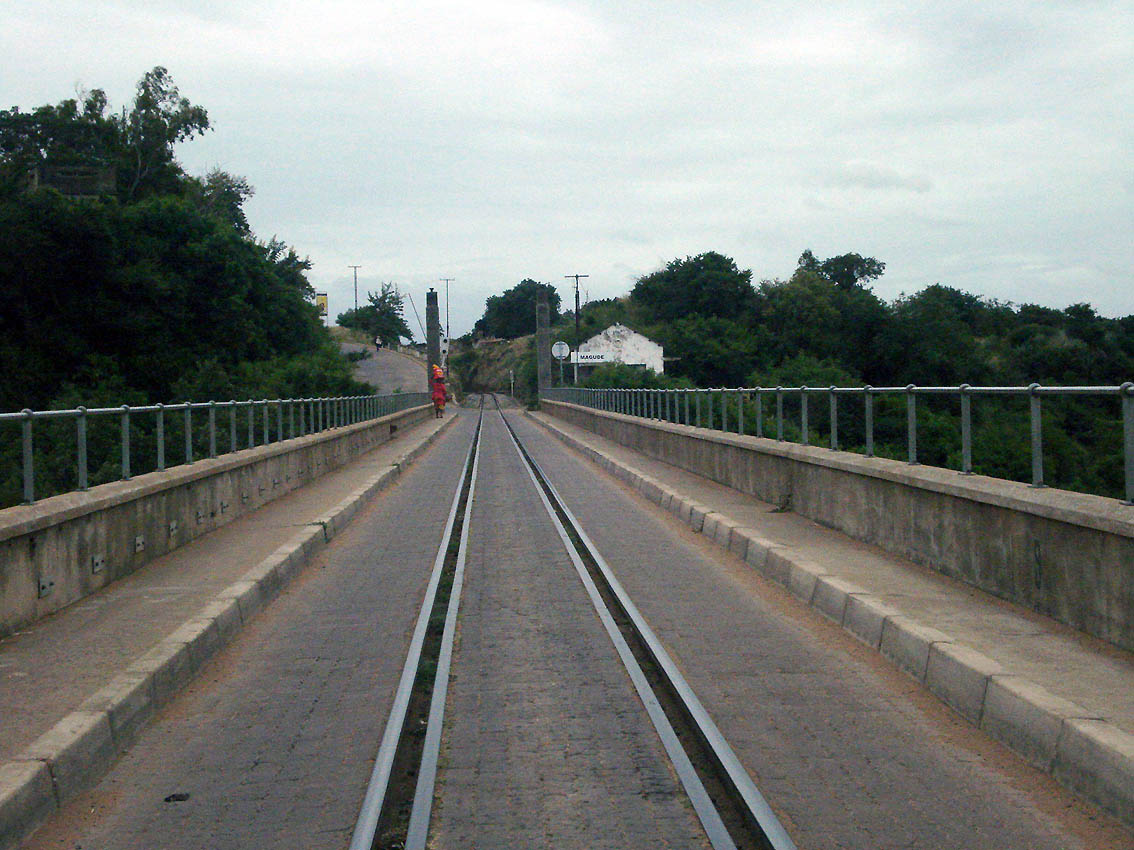
- Road and rail bridge of Magude, over the Komati River, on the Limpopo line

- Location within Mozambique
- Coordinates: 25°01′23″S 32°38′53″E
- Country: Mozambique
- Provinces: Maputo Province
- District: Magude District

Magude is a town in Maputo Province in southern Mozambique. It is the seat of Magude District.

== History ==
On 27 March 1974, the Magude train disaster, in which a passenger train collided head-on with a freight train carrying petroleum products, caused 70 deaths and 200 injuries.

== Transport ==
The town lies on a railway junction on the southern system.

== See also ==
- Transport in Mozambique
