= Palácio da Ponta Vermelha =

Official residence of president of Mozambique

Coordinates: 25.9805°S 32.5899°E

The Palácio da Ponta Vermelha is the official residence of the president of Mozambique in Maputo. Ponta Vermelha (lit. Red Point) refers to the area of Maputo where it is located rather than to any feature of the building. The name is also used metonymically to refer to the Mozambican presidency.

It began as a warehouse and staff residence involved in the construction of the railway between the then Lourenço Marques and the Transvaal. After extensive rework, it became the official residence of the Portuguese governor and, with independence in 1975, of the president of the republic.

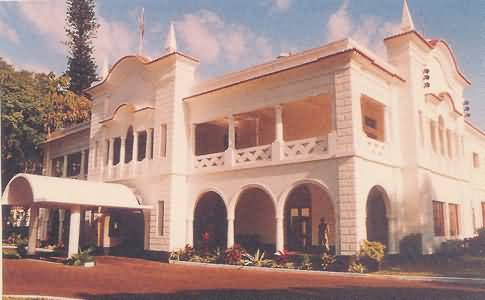
Palácio da Ponta Vermelha circa 1939
