= Namaacha District =

Coordinates: 25°58′S 32°02′E

Namaacha
- District
- Namaacha District on the map of Mozambique
- Country: Mozambique
- Province: Maputo
- Capital: Namaacha

Area
  - Total: 2,196 km^{2} (848 sq mi)

Population (2007 census)
  - Total: 41,914
  - Density: 19.09/km^{2} (49.43/sq mi)

Namaacha District is a district of Maputo Province in southern Mozambique. The principal town is Namaacha. The district is located in the southwest of the province, and borders with Moamba District in the north, Boane District in the east, Matutuíne District in the south, and with Eswatini and South Africa in the west. The area of the district is 2,196 square kilometres (848 mi^{2}). It has a population of 41,914 as of 2007.

== Geography ==
The principal rivers in the district are the Movene River, the Mabenga River, the Calichane River, the Impaputo River, and the Umbelúzi River.

The eastern part of Lebombo Mountains is in the district.

The climate is tropical humid, varying with altitude, with the average annual rainfall being 751 millimetres (29.6 in).

== History ==
The name Namaacha originates from the king Lomahacha, who was active in the area before the Portuguese colonization. In 1869, the Treaty of Pretoria gave the area to Portugal.

== Demographics ==
As of 2005, 40% of the population of the district was younger than 15 years. 63% of the population spoke Portuguese. The most common mothertongue among the population was Xichangana. 44% were analphabetic, mostly women.

== Administrative divisions ==
The district is divided into two postos, Namaacha (six localities) and Changalane (four localities).

== Economy ==
6% of the households in the district have access to electricity.

=== Agriculture ===
In the district, there are 15,000 farms which have on average 2 hectares (0.0077 mi^{2}) of land. The main agricultural products are corn, cassava, cowpea, peanut, and sweet potato.

=== Transportation ===
There is a road network in the district 166 kilometres (103 mi) long, which includes a stretches of national roads EN2, connecting Maputo and Eswatini.
