= Marracuene =

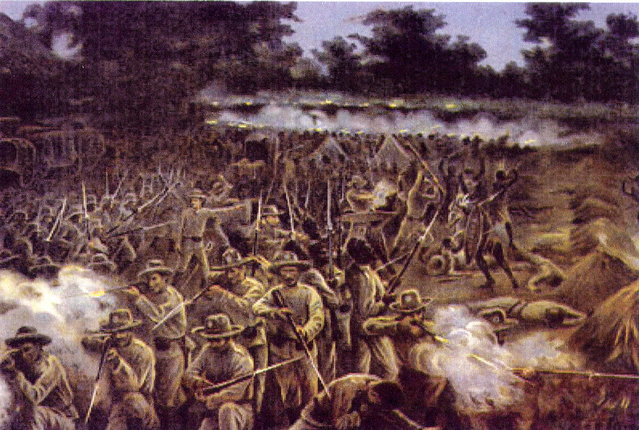
- Marracuene at war. 1899.

- Location within Mozambique
- Coordinates: 25°44′S 32°41′E
- Country: Mozambique
- Provinces: Maputo Province
- District: Marracuene District

Marracuene, earlier known as Vila Luísa, is a town in Mozambique's Maputo Province in Marracuene District, located 30 km north of Maputo on the Incomati River. The Parque de Campismo de Marracuene, a popular camping destination, is located nearby.

== History ==
On February 2, 1895, Marracuene was the site of a decisive battle between Portuguese forces under major Caldas Xavier and Gaza forces of emperor Gungunyane. The Portuguese were able to defeat the larger Gaza forces by means of repeating rifles and a machine gun.

== Tourism ==
Marracuene served as a popular tourist destination in Mozambique's colonial era thanks to a 21-mile beach on the Indian Ocean; the town also served as a key link in the Lourenço Marques Railway System.
