= 2010 Mozambican protests =

- Date: 1–7 September 2010
- Location: Mozambique
- Caused by: Increase in Food Prices; High Unemployment and Poverty; Inequality and Racism
- Goals: Decrease in prices and better living conditions; Fresh general elections
- Methods: Demonstrations, Riots
- Result: Protests suppressed by force; Decrease of Food prices

Parties
(Mozambique) Mozambican Protester	Government of Mozambique; Mozambique Police

Number
~ 10,000 (Estimated)	Unknown Number of Police Officer

Casualties
- Death: ~ Possibly 17 Killed (4 in Riot in Maputo And 13 In Subsequent General Strike And Riots)

The 2010 Mozambican protests were a series of food riots and deadly mass demonstrations sparked by spiralling food inflation and unemployment. Bread riots erupted on 1 September after a week of small strikes and turned into a street uprising, turning against the government, poverty, unemployment, inflation and hunger. Tens of thousands of opposition supporters were told to march and rally for their freedom and break the fear barrier. After four were killed in riots in Maputo, hundreds and then thousands turned up in protest movements nationwide. 13 were killed in the subsequent general strike and riots. The wave of unprecedented violence was the largest since the end of the Mozambican Civil War.
