= Manhiça District =

Coordinates: 25.406°S 32.807°E

Manhiça
- District
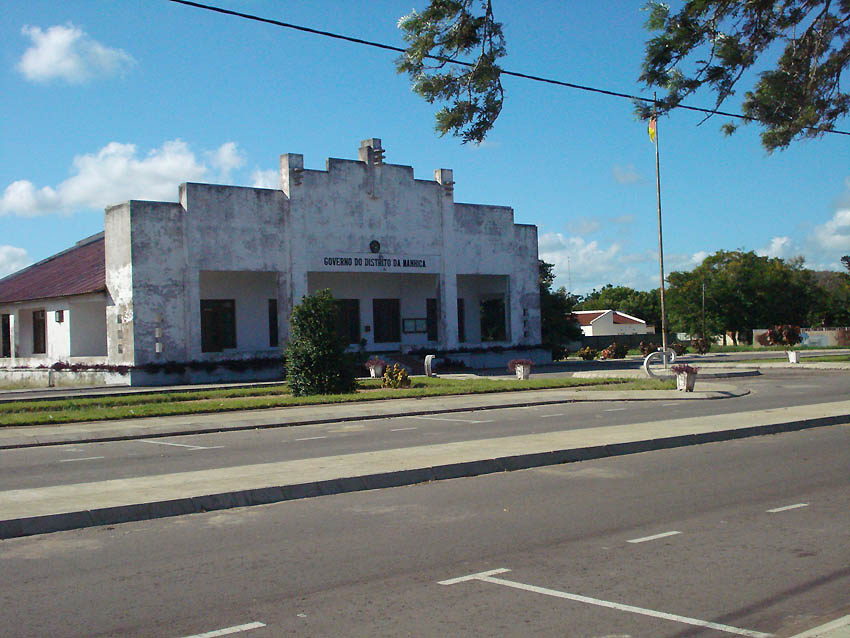
- Building of the district administration

- Manhiça District on the map of Mozambique
- Country: Mozambique
- Province: Maputo
- Capital: Manhiça

Area
  - Total: 2,373 km^{2} (916 sq mi)

Population (2007 census)
  - Total: 159,812
  - Density: 67.35/km^{2} (174.4/sq mi)

Manhiça District is a district of Maputo Province in southern Mozambique. The principal town is Manhiça. The district is located in the north of the province, and borders with Magude District in the north, Bilene Macia District of Gaza Province in the northeast, Marracuene District and the city of Maputo in the south, and with Moamba District in the west. In the east, the district is limited by the Indian Ocean. The area of the district is 2,373 square kilometres (916 mi^{2}). It has a population of 159,812 as of 2007.

== Geography ==
The principal river in the district is the Komati River. The biggest lake is Lake Chuáli.

The climate is tropical humid at the coast, and tropical dry inland, with the annual rainfall being 807 millimetres (31.8 in).

== History ==
The name of the district originates from Manacusse, a Tchaka chief, who moved here after some conflict in his native area, currently in South Africa.

== Demographics ==
As of 2005, 41% of the population of the district was younger than 15 years. 45% of the population spoke Portuguese. The most common mothertongue among the population was Xichangana. 58% were analphabetic, mostly women.

== Administrative divisions ==
The district is divided into six postos, Manhiça (three localities), Xinavane (three localities), 3 de Fevereiro (three localities), Calanga (two localities), Maluana (two localities), and Ilha Josina Machel (two localities).

== Economy ==
The town of Manhiça is notable for the research center CISM (Centro de Investigação em Saúde em Manhiça) and the Manhiça District Hospital, both institutions work closely together. The CISM receives several international students each year. Manhiça lies northwest of the capital city Maputo.

=== Agriculture ===
In the district, there are 28,000 farms which have on average 1.2 hectares (0.0046 mi^{2}) of land. The main agricultural products are corn, cassava, cowpea, peanut, and sweet potato.

=== Transportation ===
There is a road network in the district with a total length of about 200 kilometres (120 mi), which includes a stretch of the national road EN1, running from Maputo along the coast to the north of Mozambique.
