= Castle of Belvís de Monroy =

14th-century Spanish castle

Coordinates: 39.8201°N 5.6122°W

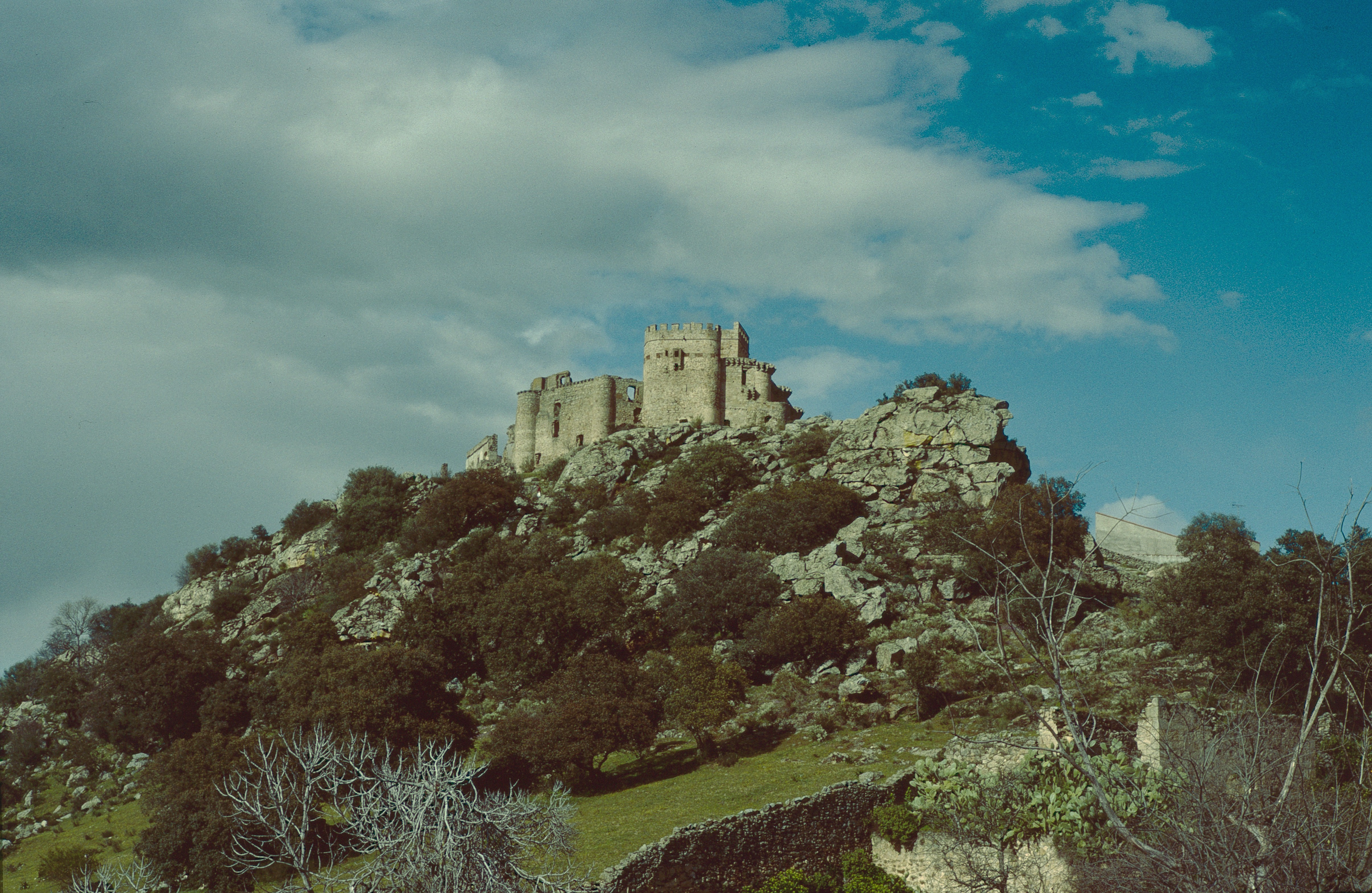
The Castle of Belvis de Monroy.

The Castle of Belvís de Monroy is a 14th-century castle located in Belvís de Monroy, Spain.

== History ==
The castle has a long history beginning in the 13th century. Located in the central part of Spain, its survival through stylistically contrasting periods in history has resulted in an aesthetically eclectic architectural design. It is considered a Spanish cultural heritage site as well as a tourist destination.
