= Quinta da Bica =

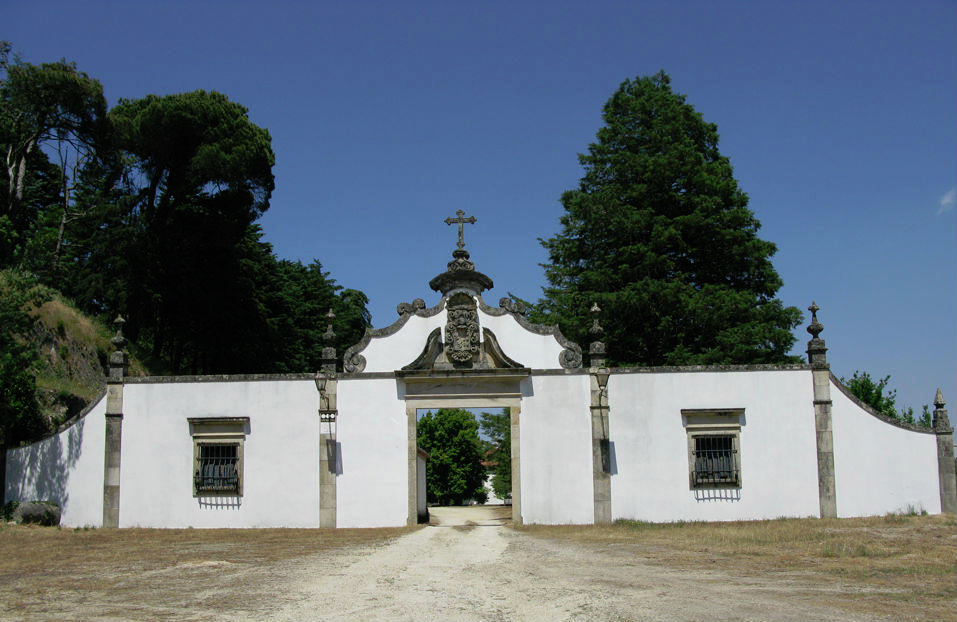
- Quinta da Bica
- Location: Seia, Portugal

History
- Built: 16th century

The Quinta da Bica is a Portuguese quinta located near Seia, in the Beira region. It is the origin of the reputed Quinta da Bica wines, which were among the founding wines of the Dão wine region, as well as being among the first wines in Portugal to be estate bottled. The estate's manor, commonly known as Casa da Bica, is currently the seat of the Viscounts of Sardoal, a cadet branch of the Spanish-Portuguese Sacadura Botte noble family.

Originally a monastery, it was bought in the early 17th century by the Ferraz de Figueiredo family. With the marriage of its 7th lady, D. Margarida Amélia Gonçalves Santiago de Montalvão de Moraes Sarmento Figueiredo e Castro, to João de Azevedo Pacheco Pereira de Sande de Sacadura Botte Côrte-Real, in 1850, and its subsequent inheritance by their second son, it became the seat of a cadet branch of the Sacadura Botte family. Also due to this marriage, the estate benefited from the renowned viticulturist João de Sacadura Botte Côrte-Real's efforts to improve and perfect the quality of the region's wine. Nowadays, it is the only one of Sacadura Botte's former wine estates still owned by the family.

== History ==
The estate's main house was originally built as a monastery, in the early 16th century. About a century later, it was bought by Filipe Ferraz de Figueiredo, a local landed noble knight, who also owned a manor in the nearby village of Seia. His son, João Ferraz de Figueiredo, bought some of the surrounding land, and his grandson, Manuel Ferraz de Figueiredo, instituted a majorat, including the main house, its dependencies and the surrounding lands, effectively creating the estate.

Upon Manuel Ferraz de Figueiredo's death, the estate was inherited by Jacinto Ferraz de Figueiredo, his only male heir. However, Jacinto was a priest, and did not leave any children, so the estate was inherited by his sister, D. Maria Teresa de Matos Ferraz, married to Domingos Gonçalves Santiago, a King's Justice and Knight of the Order of Christ. Thus, the estate entered the Gonçalves Santiago family. This family was of Spanish descent, but had been established in the north-eastern region of Chaves for a few generations, their seat being Quinta da Raposeira, near the village of Outeiro Seco.

The coat of arms of the Quinta da Bica is a result of this union: the shield featuring the impaled arms of the Gonçalves and Ferraz families, to which Domingos Gonçalves Santiago and D. Maria Teresa de Matos Ferraz respectively belonged. The marriage produced three surviving children: two sons and a daughter. The eldest, Vicente José Gonçalves Santiago de Figueiredo, followed his father's footsteps and became both a King's Justice and a Knight of the Order of Christ, as well as Lord of Quinta da Bica estate upon the death of his father. It was during his time that, in the midst of the Peninsular War, the main house suffered extensive damage after being set on fire by the French troops, under Marshall Masséna, retreating from their defeat at the Battle of Bussaco, in 1810. More than half of the main house was rendered unusable, and as a result it was subjected to extensive reconstruction work that lasted until the beginning of the 20th century.

Vicente José Gonçalves Santiago de Figueiredo married D. Maria Caetana Madalena Ferreira de Montalvão de Moraes Sarmento e Castro, but their large issue consisted exclusively of daughters. The eldest, D. Ana Amélia Miquelina Gonçalves Santiago de Figueiredo de Moraes Sarmento e Castro, went on to inherit the estate, but never married, so her sister D. Rita Cândida Gonçalves Santiago de Montalvão became her heir presumptive. In an attempt to keep the estate in the family, D. Rita Cândida married her first cousin, José Gonçalves Santiago de Figueiredo, the only son of her father's younger brother, Joaquim José Gonçalves Santiago de Figueiredo, and his wife D. Francisca Teresa Joaquina Correia da Cunha.

This attempt, however, only managed to postpone the changing of families for another generation, as D. Rita Cândida and her husband only had two daughters. The eldest of these was D. Margarida Amélia Gonçalves Santiago de Montalvão de Moraes Sarmento Figueiredo e Castro, who married João de Azevedo Pacheco Pereira de Sande de Sacadura Botte Côrte-Real, Lord of Quinta da Aguieira. João de Sacadura Botte Côrte-Real, as he was most often referred to, was a widely acclaimed viticulturist and winemaker. Contemporary reports called him "the greatest winemaker of these times", "the most enlightened viticulturist of his generation" and the "archetypal patriarch of the rural landed nobility". In his estate of Aguieira he produced some of the finest wines of the Dão Region, which he was partially responsible for creating, as he was the founder of the first União Vinícola do Dão. He had other estates, both in Portugal and Spain, and produced wine from some of them. The Quinta da Bica estate greatly benefited from this marriage, since it was under João de Sacadura Botte Côrte-Real's auspices that its vineyards were brought to prime condition and its now well-known wine was first commercialized.

Upon his death, his eldest son inherited the main estate and family seat of Quinta da Agueira, whereas Quinta da Bica was inherited by his second son. He was João Pacheco de Sacadura Botte, a King's Justice, whose judicial career was, however, cut short by a crippling throat cancer. He survived, being treated in Germany with state-of-the-art medical care; and managed to communicate thanks to a specially designed silver device which acted as a prosthetic throat, but was unable to continue to serve as a King's Justice in result of the illness' effects. He continued, however, his father's work in both running the estate and wine-making, aided at different times by his three male sons, João, José Maria and Theodorico César.

After King Dom Carlos I of Portugal and his heir apparent, Prince Royal Dom Luís Filipe, Duke of Braganza, were murdered in Lisbon, the estate had its main gates closed and standards lowered in mourning. João Pacheco de Sacadura Botte, at the time lord of the estate, personally knew the deceased king, and had hunted with him on occasion. After the proclamation of the Republic in Portugal, the estate continued flying the flag of the Kingdom of Portugal, as opposed to the new Portuguese Republic's flag, for decades. It also served as headquarters for Sacadura Botte's several unsuccessful campaigns to galvanize the Beira region into supporting attempts to restore the Monarchy.

== Genealogy ==
Originally bought by Filipe Ferraz de Figueiredo, the Quinta da Bica was only instituted as a majorat (or morgadio in Portuguese), by his grandson Manuel Ferraz de Figueiredo. Thus, the third de facto owner of the estate was, de jure, its first lord. The estate's rules of succession gave preference to male heirs, as was usual, but, in their absence, did not exclude female heirs. The estate hence passed from the Ferraz de Figueiredo lineage to the Gonçalves Santiago lineage, and later on to the Sacadura Botte lineage, in which it remains to this day.

Filipe Ferraz de Figueiredo	Maria; Fernandes
João Ferraz de Figueiredo	Ana Francisca; Fernandes
Manuel Ferraz de Figueiredo; 1st of Quinta da Bica	Maria Rodrigues de Matos Caldeira
Jacinto Ferraz de Figueiredo; 2nd of Quinta da Bica	Domingos Gonçalves Santiago	Maria Teresa de Matos Ferraz; 3rd of Quinta da Bica
Vicente José Gonçalves; Santiago de Figueiredo; 4th of Quinta da Bica	Maria Caetana Madalena; Ferreira de Montalvão e Moraes Sarmento	Joaquim José Gonçalves; Santiago de Figueiredo	Francisca Teresa Joaquina; Correia da Cunha
Ana Amélia Miquelina; Gonçalves Santiago de Figueiredo de Moraes Sarmento e Castro; 5th of Quinta da Bica	Rita Cândida Gonçalves; Santiago de Montalvão; 6th of Quinta da Bica	José Gonçalves; Santiago de Figueiredo
João de Azevedo Pacheco; Pereira de Sande de Sacadura; Botte Côrte-Real	Margarida Amélia Gonçalves; Santiago de Montalvão de Moraes; Sarmento Figueiredo e Castro; 7th of Quinta da Bica
João Pacheco de Sacadura Botte; 8th of Quinta da Bica	Maria da Ascensão; Mendes de Oliva
José Maria da Costa; Pereira Pacheco de Sacadura Botte; 9th of Quinta da Bica	Maria Madalena d'Abreu; Castelo-Branco Trigueiros Frazão; 4th Viscountess of Sardoal
João de Azevedo; Pacheco de Sacadura Botte; 10th of Quinta da Bica; 5th Viscount of Sardoal	Ana Filipa Osório; Mayer de Carvalho
Joana Maria Mayer de Carvalho de Sacadura Botte; 6th Viscountess of Sardoal	Marta Mayer de Carvalho de Sacadura Botte	Matilde Mayer de Carvalho de Sacadura Botte	Madalena Mayer de Carvalho de Sacadura Botte
