= Marracuene District =

Coordinates: 25°44′S 32°41′E

Marracuene
- District
- Marracuene District on the map of Mozambique
- Country: Mozambique
- Province: Maputo
- Capital: Marracuene

Area
  - Total: 703 km^{2} (271 sq mi)

Population (2007 census)
  - Total: 136,784
  - Density: 195/km^{2} (504/sq mi)

Marracuene District is a district of Maputo Province in southern Mozambique. The principal town is Marracuene. The district is located in the center of the province, and borders with Manhiça District in the north, the city of Maputo in the south, and with the city of Matola and with Moamba District in the west. In the east, the district is limited by the Indian Ocean. The area of the district is 703 square kilometres (271 mi^{2}). It has a population of 136,784 as of 2007.

== Geography ==
The principal river in the district is the Incomati River.

The climate is tropical humid, with the annual rainfall ranging between 500 millimetres (20 in) and 1,000 millimetres (39 in).

== Demographics ==
As of 2005, 41% of the population of the district was younger than 15 years of age. 59% of the population spoke Portuguese. The most common mother tongue among the population was xiRonga. 48% of the population were illiterate, mostly women.

== Administrative divisions ==
The district is divided into two postos, Marracuene (three localities) and Machubo (two localities).

== Economy ==
2% of the households in the district have access to electricity.

=== Agriculture ===
In the district, there are 10,000 farms with, on average, 1.1 hectares (0.0042 mi^{2}) of land. The main agricultural products are corn, cassava, cowpea, peanut, rice, and sweet potato.

=== Transportation ===
There is a road network in the district, which includes 40 kilometres (25 mi) of the national road EN1, running from Maputo north along the coast.
