= Namaacha =

- Location within Mozambique
- Coordinates: 25°58′S 32°02′E
- Country: Mozambique
- Provinces: Maputo Province
- District: Namaacha District

Namaacha or Naamacha is a town in southern Mozambique, lying 80 kilometers west of Maputo on the border with Eswatini. It is located in the Lebombos area. It is known for its colonial church and for its waterfall.

The town of Namaacha lies in Namaacha District, of Maputo Province.

== History ==
In the 1960s, Danúbio Nunes, a Portuguese citizen living in Namaacha, publicised the slogan Faça da Namaacha a Sintra de Moçambique ("Make Namaacha Mozambique's Sintra"), due to some local features, namely the climate, the altitude and the proximity to the capital city, that could make it comparable to the picturesque and historical town of Sintra, in the proximity of Portugal's capital city.

This might be at the origin of Namaacha having later been twinned with:

- Sintra, Portugal

== Notable people ==
- Azagaia (1984–2023), rapper
