= Magude District =

Coordinates: 25°01′23″S 32°38′53″E

Magude
- District
- Magude District on the map of Mozambique
- Country: Mozambique
- Province: Maputo
- Capital: Magude

Area
  - Total: 7,010 km^{2} (2,710 sq mi)

Population (2007 census)
  - Total: 53,317
  - Density: 7.61/km^{2} (19.7/sq mi)

Magude District is a district of Maputo Province in southern Mozambique. The principal town is Magude. The district is located in the north of the province, and borders Massingir and Chókwè Districts of Gaza Province in the north, Manhiça District in the east, Moamba District in the south, and South Africa in the west. The area of the district is 7,010 square kilometres (2,710 mi^{2}). It has a population of 53,317 as of 2007.

== Geography ==
The principal river in the district is the Komati River. Other rivers, such as the Mazimuchopes River, the Massintonto River, and the Uanétze River, are seasonal and only flow during the rainy season.

The climate is subtropical dry, with the annual rainfall being 630 millimetres (25 in).

== History ==
The name Magude originates from Magudzo Cossa, a Tsonga king who was active in the area in the second half of the 19th century. Before 1874, the Magude Circunscrição, an administrative unit in colonial Portuguese Africa, was established, but the descendants of Magudzo Cossa retained the traditional role of the chiefs and were incorporated into the government.

== Demographics ==
As of 2005, 42% of the population of the district was younger than 15 years. 41% of the population spoke Portuguese. The most common mothertongue among the population was Tsonga language. 59% were analphabetic, mostly women.

== Administrative divisions ==
The district is divided into five postos, Magude, Mapulanguene, Mahela, Motaze, and Panjane, which in total contain 18 localities.

== Economy ==
6% of the households in the district have access to electricity.

=== Agriculture ===
In the district, there are 7,500 farms which have on average 2.3 hectares (0.0089 mi^{2}) of land. The main agricultural products are corn, cassava, cowpea, peanut, and sweet potato.

=== Transportation ===
There is a road network in the district of the total length of 806 kilometres (501 mi), of which 41 kilometres (25 mi) are paved. There is a bridge over the Komati River, which requires a restoration.
