= Matola =

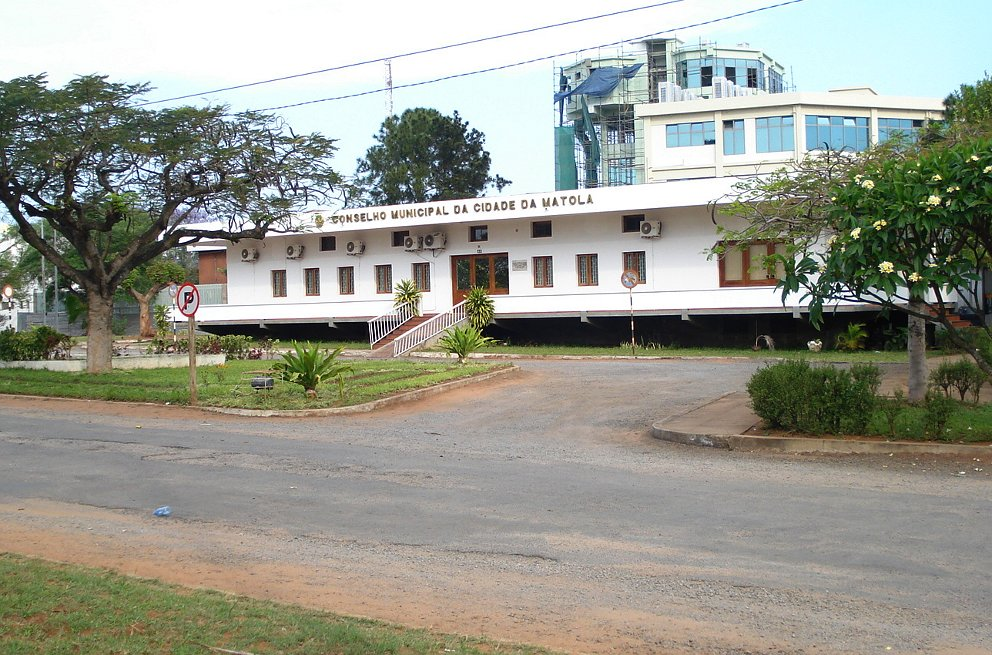
- Old building of Municipal Council of Matola

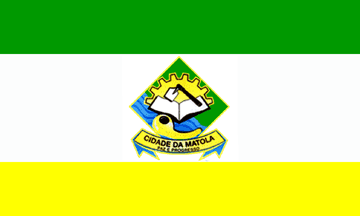
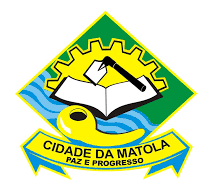
- Flag Coat of arms

- Location within Mozambique
- Coordinates: 25°57′44″S 32°27′32″E
- Country: Mozambique
- Provinces: Maputo Province
- Municipality: Matola

Area
  - Total: 373 km^{2} (144 sq mi)
- Elevation: 3 m (9.8 ft)

Population (2017 census)
  - Total: 1,032,197
  - Estimate (2019): 1,153,000
  - Rank: 2nd
  - Density: 2,770/km^{2} (7,170/sq mi)
- Climate: BSh

Matola [mɐˈtolɐ] is the largest suburb of the Mozambique capital, Maputo, adjacent to its westernmost side. It is the nation's most populated city. Matola is the capital of Maputo Province and has had its own elected municipal government since 1998. It has a port and also the biggest industrial area in Mozambique. The population of Matola was, according to the 2007 census, 671,556 inhabitants, having increased to a 2017 census population of 1,032,197.

== Etymology ==
Matola, which is also a common family name, comes from Matsolo a Ronga kingdom that existed in this region when the colonists arrived.

== Industry ==
Matola is an industrial centre with an important port for minerals (chromium and iron) and other exports from Eswatini and South Africa. It has petroleum refineries (presently inactive) and diverse industries, which manufacture products like soap, cement, and agricultural materials. The most important of these is an aluminium smelter, installed in 2002, that more than doubled Mozambique's GDP. In November 2014, South Korean car company Hyundai Motor Company opened a plant in Matola (Somyoung Motors), which manufactures the Hyundai i10 and Hyundai Accent.

== Transport ==
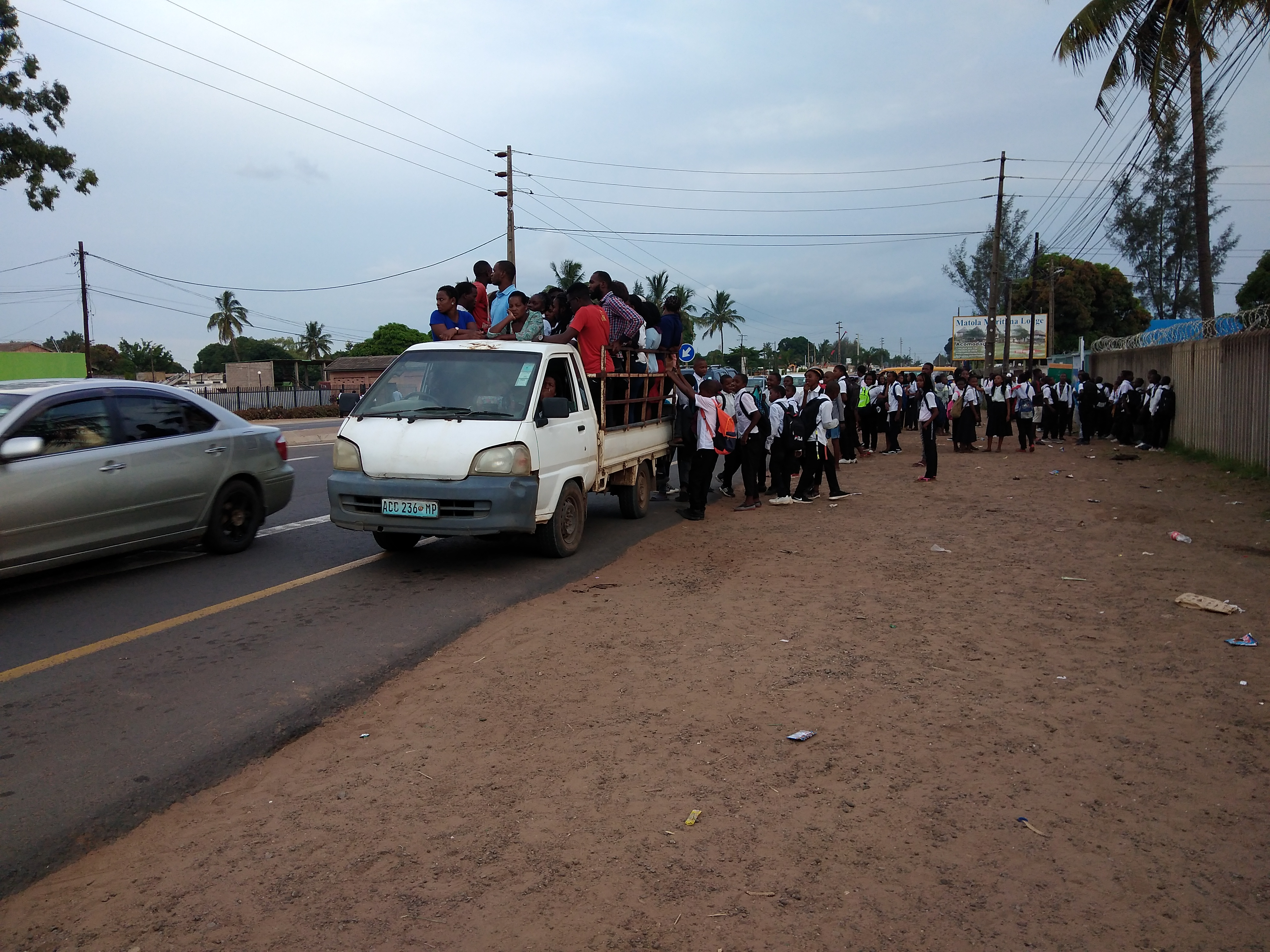
Popular public transport in Matola.

Matola is served by a station on the southern network of Mozambique Ports and Railways, connecting the Goba railway and the Pretoria-Maputo railway. Coal is exported from here.

== Geography ==
Matola is also the name of a small river (some 30 km long), that makes the northern border of the Matola municipality, and flows into Maputo Bay.

== Demographics ==
Year (census)	Population
1997	424,662
2007	671,556
2017	1,032,197

== Town twinning ==
- Loures, Portugal (since 1996)
- Johannesburg, South Africa

== See also ==
- Transport in Mozambique
- Metropolitan Maputo
