= Maputo Province =

Province of Mozambique

Coordinates: 25°30′S 32°20′E

Maputo
- Province
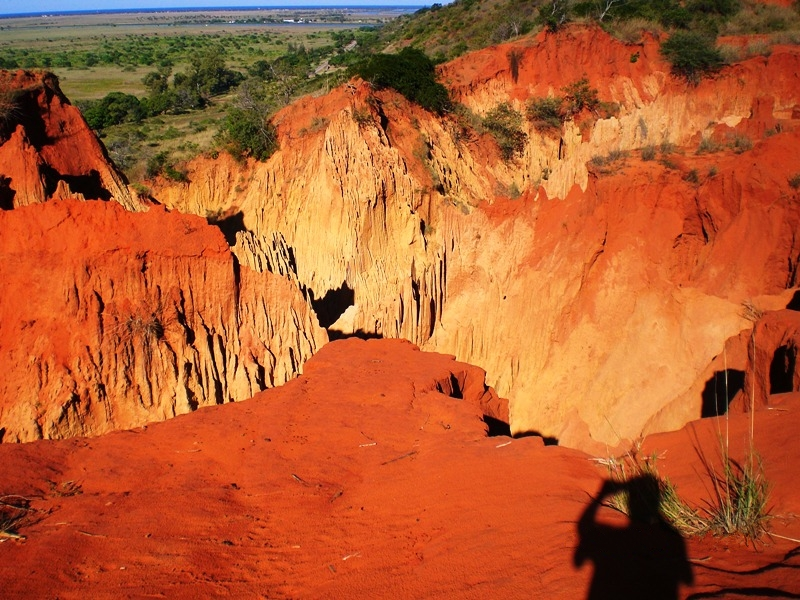

- Maputo Province, Province of Mozambique
- Country: Mozambique
- Capital: Matola

Government
  - Governor: Manuel Tule

Area
  - Total: 22,693 km^{2} (8,762 sq mi)

Population (2017 census)
  - Total: 1,968,906
  - Estimate (2020): 2,216,460
  - Density: 86.763/km^{2} (224.71/sq mi)
- Postal code: 020x-0x
- Area code: (+258) 21
- HDI (2021): 0.529 low · 2nd of 11
- Website: www.pmaputo.gov.mz

Maputo [mɐˈputu] is a province of Mozambique; the province excludes the city of Maputo (which comprises a separate province). The province has an area of 22,693 km^{2} (8,762 sq mi) and a population of 1,968,906 (2017 census). Its capital is the city of Matola.

== Geography ==
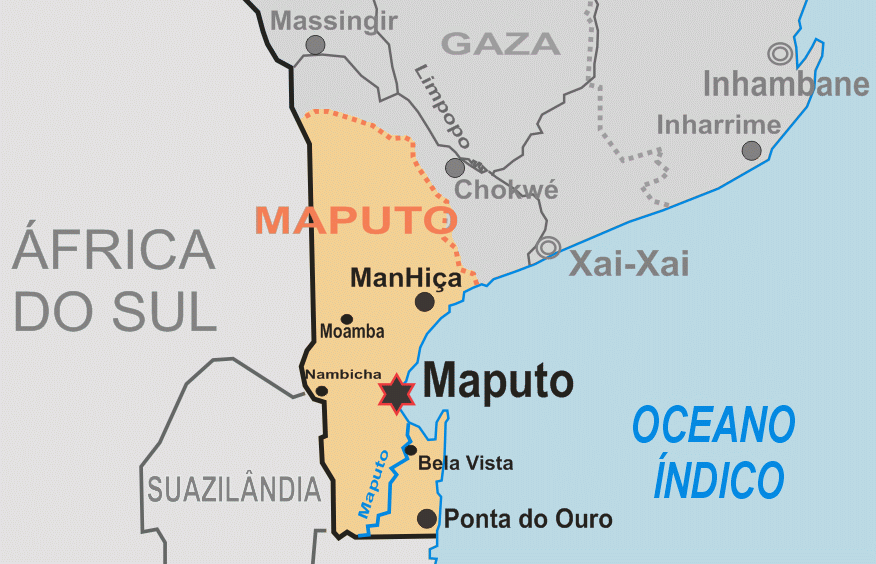
Provincial map

Maputo Province is the southernmost province of Mozambique. It borders Gaza Province to the north, the Indian Ocean to the east, the South African province of KwaZulu-Natal to the south, Eswatini to the southwest, and the Mpumalanga province of South Africa to the west and northwest. The Maputo Bay area to the southeast of Maputo is an important conservation area with many reefs and lakes. Of particular note is the Maputo Elephant Game Reserve, which has lakes such as Lagoa Chingute and Lagoa Piti in the vicinity, and the Machangulo Private Nature Reserve further north of this in the Machangulo Peninsula. The largest river of the province, the Maputo River, running from Amsterdam, Mpumalanga in South Africa near the Eswatini border, flows into Maputo Bay to the southeast of Maputo. Also flowing into the bay are the Umbeluzi River and the Incomati River. In the fall of 1999, the Maputo, Umbeluzi, Incompati and Limpopo rivers were affected by severe rainfall, 70 percent higher than normal which caused severe flooding. The Maputo and Incomati burst their banks on 12 January 2000, directly affecting some 40,000, and flooding along the Incomati affected about 20,000 several days later.

To the north of the peninsula is the Inhaca Island (Ilha da Inhaca), a 52-square-kilometre (20 sq mi) subtropical island, about 12 kilometres (7.5 mi) from north to south by 7 kilometres (4.3 mi) from east to west which separates Maputo Bay to the west from the Indian Ocean off its eastern shores. It is protected under the Lubombo Transfrontier Conservation Area, and contains the Reserva da Inhaca. The highest point of the island is Mount Inhaca at 104 metres (341 ft) on the north-eastern shoreline.

In the northwest of the province, near the South African border is a major reservoir and dam complex, the Corumana Dam, which dams the Sabie River. In 2014 it was reported that hydro-mechanical specialists have been consulted to see a further expansion of the complex, with the aim of increasing the height of the dam from 110 metres (360 ft) to 117 metres (384 ft), and installing crest spillway gates and a fuse plug. The dam is under the responsibility of the water directorate, Direcção Nacional de Águas (DNA).

== Districts ==
Maputo Province is divided into 8 districts:

- Boane District
- Magude District
- Manhiça District
- Marracuene District
- Matola District
- Moamba District
- Namaacha District
- Matutuíne District

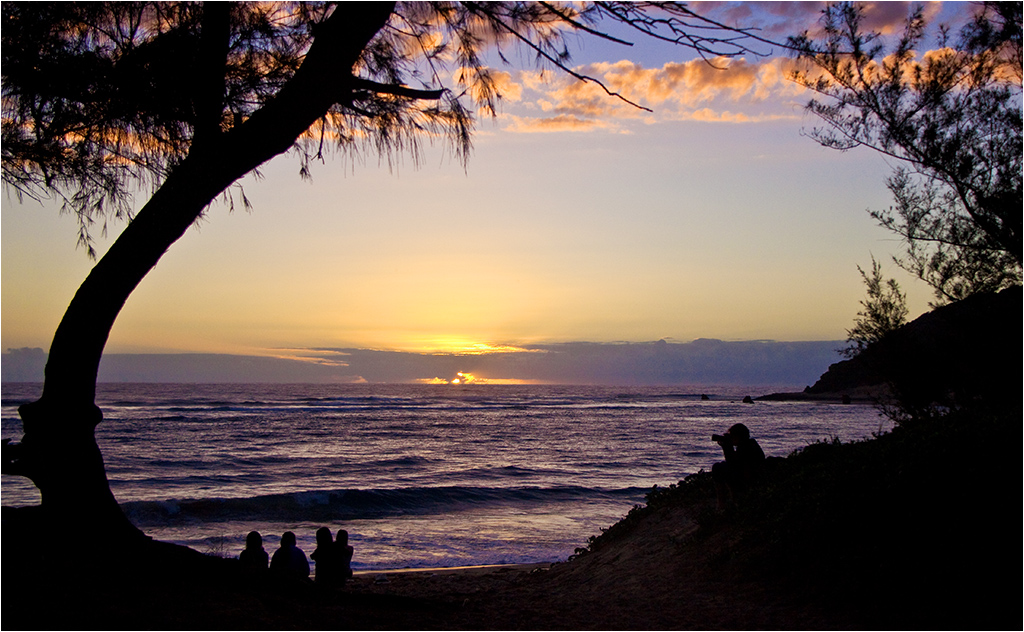
Ponta do Ouro sunset, Mozambique

and 6 municipalities:

- Boane
- Manhiça
- Marracuene
- Matola
- Matola-Rio
- Namaacha

== Demographics ==
According to the 2017 census, the province had 1,931,298 inhabitants and an area of 22,693 square kilometres (8,762 sq mi), hence resulting in a population density of 85.11 inhabitants per km^{2}. 99.47% were Mozambicans (including those of Portuguese descent), 0.27% were South Africans, and a small minority were from other nationalities. 33.94% were Pentecostal, 30.56% were Zionist, 14.57% were Catholic, 8.11% were without religion, 3.29% were Muslim, and 9.53% were another religion.

Between 2007 and 2017, the population grew by 48.2%, the fastest growing region in Mozambique. As of the 2007 census, the province had a population of 1,233,143 residents. With an area of 22,693 square kilometres (8,762 sq mi), the population density was about 54.34 people per km^{2}.

Historical population
Year	Pop.	±%
1950	198,932	—
1960	437,000	+119.7%
1970	799,502	+83.0%
1980	500,892	−37.3%
1997	832,100	+66.1%
2007	1,233,143	+48.2%
2017	1,931,298	+56.6%
Source: Statoids INE

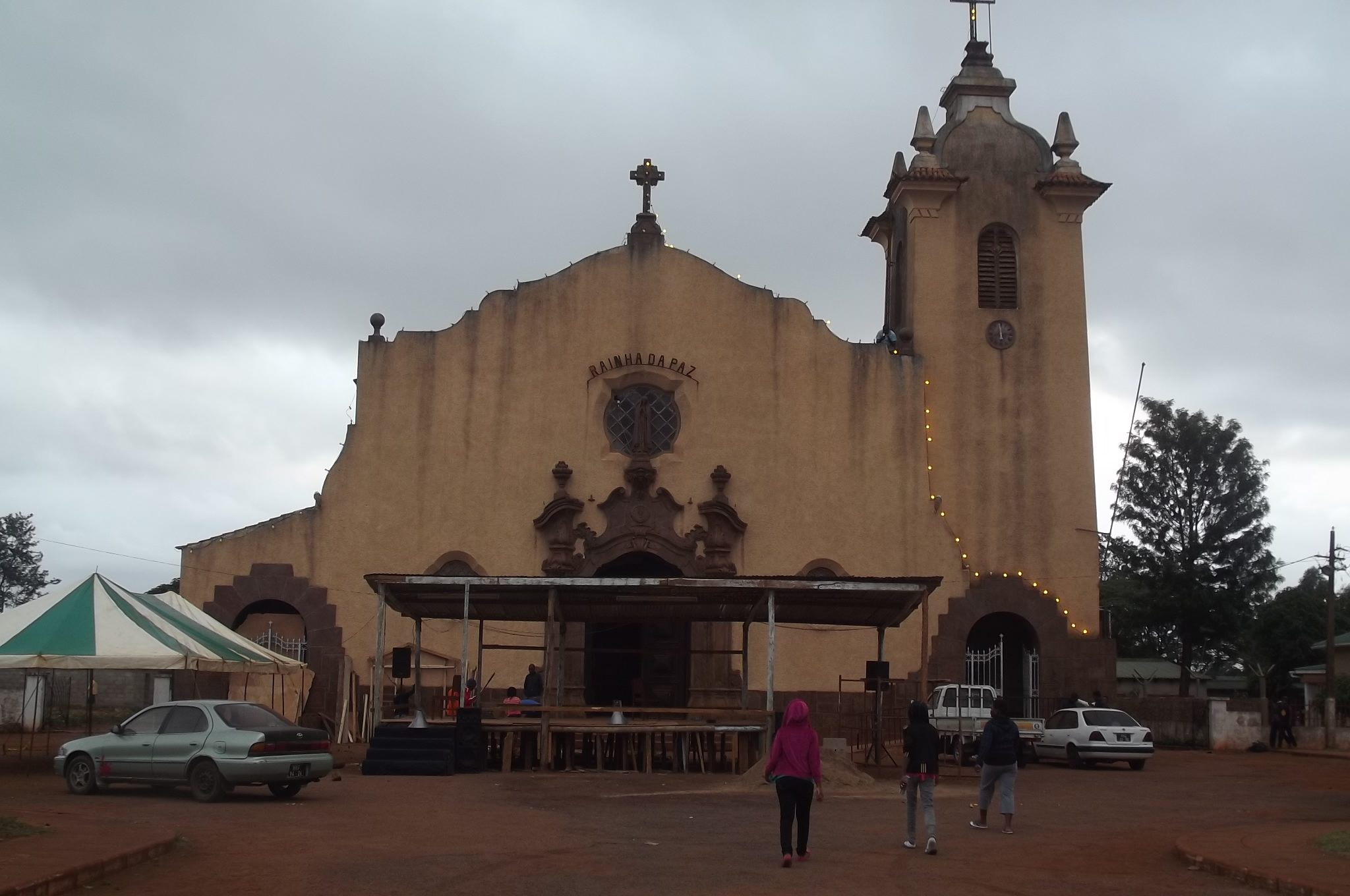
Namaacha church
