= Energy in Mozambique =

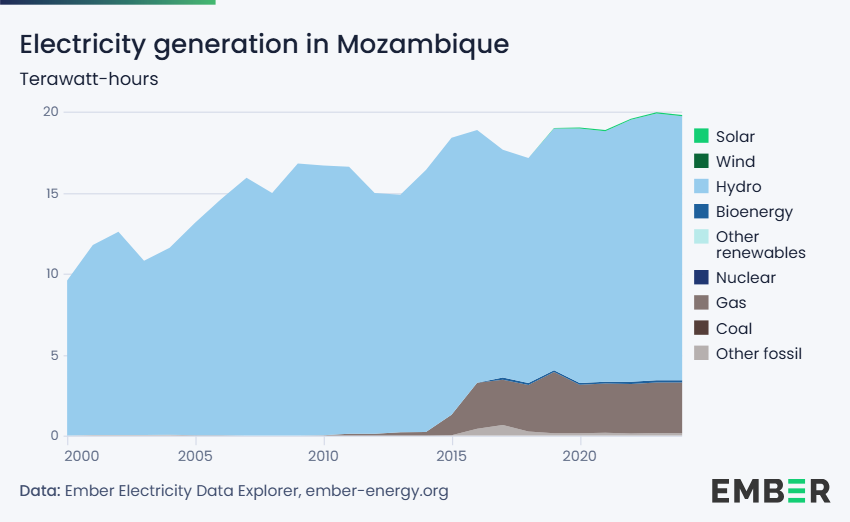
Electricity generation in Mozambique in terawatt-hours

Mozambique has abundant energy sources available for exploitation. As of 2021, the country was ranked first in energy potential of all the countries in the Southern African Power Pool (SAPP), with an estimated energy capacity of 187,000 MW. Available energy sources include coal, hydroelectricity, natural gas, solar energy and wind power. As of September 2021, the largest proportion of the power currently generated is from hydroelectric sources. However the energy mix in the country is changing. Natural gas powered energy stations are expected to provide 44 percent of total energy generation from 2020 to 2030.

== Background ==
In 2018, with an "average operating generation capacity of 2,279 MW", the country had an electricity consumption of 415 kWh per person, per year, about 50 kWh higher than the then prevailing average for Sub-Saharan Africa. It is estimated that 85 percent of electricity consumption in Mozambique is consumed by industry.

As of March 2021, the electrification rate for Mozambique's estimated 32 million citizens was 34 percent. Contributing factors include an underdeveloped transmission and distribution network, lack of funding and bureaucracy constraints. Network expansion is driven by industry and business growth. The average Mozambican domestic consumer cannot afford the electricity tariffs, although they are heavily subsidized by the government of Mozambique.

Mozambique is a net exporter of electricity to the members of SAPP, primarily South Africa. Electricidade de Moçambique (EDM) is the national electric monopoly company. 65 percent of its national electric sales revenue is derived from the capital city of Maputo and the surrounding Maputo Province.

== Hydroelectricity ==
As of 2024, Mozambique's power system had an installed capacity of approximately 2.9 GW, dominated by hydropower, which accounted for about 74% of capacity, followed by gas at 15% and solar at 3%.

The 2,075 megawatts Cahora Bassa Hydroelectric Power Station (CBHPS) across the Zambezi River, is the largest power station in Mozambique. The power station is operated by Hidroelectrica de Cahora Bassa (HCB), a Mozambican parastatal company. HCB sells 65 percent of its output (about 1,349 megawatts), directly to South Africa via the 1,420 kilometres (882 mi) Cahora Bassa–Johannesburg High Voltage Transmission Line. Some of the remaining 35 percent (about 726 megawatts), is exported to Zimbabwe and the rest is distributed to the northern provinces of Mozambique.

There are over 3,400 megawatts of hydropower stations in the pipeline in Mozambique, the majority planned across the Zambezi River, including the 1,500 megawatts Mphanda Nkuwa Hydroelectric Power Station and the proposed 1,245 megawatts extension to the CBHPS. The country has over 3,000 megawatts of potential small hydropower sites across all regions.

== Solar energy ==
Mozambique has a potential solar energy yield estimated between 1,785 and 2,206 kWh/m2/year, resulting in a solar energy potential of 23,000GWh/year. In August 2019, the first grid-ready solar power station, the 40 megawatts Mocuba Solar Power Station, in Mocuba District, Zambezia Province, achieved commercial commissioning. Developed as a public–private partnership (PPP) project, it is co-owned by a European IPP, a Mozambican parastatal and a European financier.

Other solar power installations, which are in different stages of development include the 20 megawatts Cuamba Solar Power Station in Niassa Province, the 40 megawatts Dondo Solar Power Station, in Sofala Province, the 41 megawatts Metoro Solar Power Station in Cabo Delgado Province and the 100 megawatts Nacala Solar Power Station in Nampula Province.

== Wind power ==
In September 2020, EleQtra, an American IPP, began construction of the 120 megawatts Namaacha Wind Power Station, in Maputo Province, the first grid-ready wind farm in Mozambique. Completion is anticipated in 2023.

== Oil and natural gas ==
Mozambique has proven natural gas reserves in excess of 180 trillion cubic feet. Initial discoveries in the region were made in 2012, marking the beginning of intensive exploration activity. The basin is divided into several offshore concession areas, with Offshore Area 1 and Offshore Area 4 containing the most substantial reserves. In Inhambane Province, Sasol Limited processes natural gas for export via pipeline to South Africa with a fraction sent to Maputo for domestic consumption. The reserves in this province are estimated at 2.6 trillion cubic feet. A second pipeline has been proposed to deliver petrol and diesel fuel from Maputo to Gauteng, South Africa.

=== Area 1 ===
Initial discoveries in Area 1 were made by Anadarko Petroleum beginning in 2012 with the Windjammer discovery, followed by Barquentine, Lagosta, and Camarao and Tubarao. In 2012, the entire discovery area was renamed to the Prosperidade complex. The second major complex, Golfinho/Atum, includes the Golfinho, Atum field, and Orca field. In 2019, TotalEnergies acquired Anadarko's Mozambique assets from Occidental Petroleum and assumed operations of the project. TotalEnergies leads the Mozambique liquid natural gas (LNG) project in Offshore Area 1, which involves developing liquefied natural gas infrastructure to export gas from the offshore fields. The project represents one of the largest energy investments in sub-Saharan Africa. In October 2025, TotalEnergies reported that project costs had increased by $4.5 billion, bringing total expenditure to approximately $29 billion, and decided in January 2026 to develop the project for 13 million tonnes of LNG by 2029.

=== Area 4 ===
Area 4 is being developed through multiple projects and contains three major gas field complexes discovered between 2011 and 2014. The three field complexes contain substantial reserves, with the Mamba Complex holding over 40 trillion cubic feet, Coral approximately 16 trillion cubic feet, and Agulha between 5 and 7 trillion cubic feet of natural gas. Eni operates the Coral South floating facility in Offshore Area 4, developed in partnership with ExxonMobil, China National Petroleum Corporation, Galp Energia (purchased by Abu Dhabi's XRG in 2025), Korea Gas Corporation, and the national hydrocarbon company of Mozambique, Empresa Nacional de Hidrocarbonetos. The Coral South FLNG became the first LNG project in Mozambique to begin production, with first gas achieved in November 2022. The floating platform approach differs from the onshore LNG plant in Area 1, utilizing a permanently moored vessel to process and liquefy gas at sea. Eni has proposed a second FLNG facility, Coral North, as an alternative development strategy to accelerate gas monetization from the Coral and Agulha fields while security concerns persist onshore.

The larger project, led by ExxonMobil, targets gas from the Mamba Complex fields (North and South) and plans to construct two onshore liquefaction trains with combined capacity of approximately 15.2 million tonnes per year. The development plan for Rovuma LNG was approved by the Mozambique government in 2019 and includes 24 subsea wells feeding the onshore facility.

=== Challenges ===
The development of natural gas infrastructure in the Rovuma Basin has been significantly impacted by an armed insurgency in Cabo Delgado province. Beginning in 2017, militants operating under the name al-Shabab (unrelated to the Somali group) and later pledging allegiance to ISIL, launched attacks across the region. In 2021, insurgents attacked the town of Palma, which is located near the TotalEnergies project site at Afungi. TotalEnergies declared force majeure and suspended construction of its LNG facility. The company announced plans to resume operations in 2025.

The gas projects have raised human rights concerns related to displacement, compensation, and the conduct of security forces. Human rights organizations have documented allegations of abuses by Mozambican security forces operating in areas around gas project infrastructure, including reports of civilian harassment, arbitrary arrests, and violence against residents in Quitunda and surrounding areas following the 2021 Palma attack. In March 2025, French prosecutors opened a manslaughter investigation into TotalEnergies following the 2021 Palma attack, with survivors and victims' families accusing the company of failing to adequately protect subcontractors.

== See also ==
- List of power stations in Mozambique
- Southern African Power Pool
