= Mavuzi Hydroelectric Power Station =

Power station in Mozambique

- Map of Mozambique showing the location of Mavuzi Power Station
- Country: Mozambique
- Location: Maria, Manica Province
- Coordinates: 19°31′34″S 33°29′35″E
- Purpose: Power
- Status: Operational
- Owner: Government of Mozambique
- Operator: Electricidade de Mozambique

Dam and spillways
- Impounds: Revue River

Reservoir
- Normal elevation: 160 m (520 ft)

Power Station
- Commission date: 1957 & 2017
- Turbines: 5 (Francis)
- Installed capacity: 41 MW (55,000 hp)

The Mavuzi Hydroelectric Power Station is an operational 41 megawatts (55,000 hp) hydroelectric power project in Mozambique. The power plant, first established in 1957, underwent upgrades and rehabilitation in 2017, adjusting its generating capacity, from 52 megawatts to 41 megawatts, with prolongation of its lifespan by another thirty years.

== Location ==
The power station is located near the villages of Maria and Costina, in Manica Province, along the Revue River, downstream of the Chicamba Hydroelectric Power Station. This location is approximately 132 kilometres (82 mi), by road, south-east of the town of Manica, where the provincial capital is located. Costina is located about 64 kilometres (40 mi), by road, south of the city of Chimoio, the largest city in Manica Province. The geographical coordinates of Mavuzi HPP are: 19°31'34.0"S, 33°29'35.0"E (Latitude:-19.526111, Longitude:33.493056).

== Overview ==
Mavuzi Hydroelectric Power Station (41 megawatts), together with nearby Chicamba Hydroelectric Power Station (44 megawatts), both located in Manica Province, were intended to supply electricity to the provinces of Manica and neighboring Sofala, supplemented with power obtained from the Cahora Bassa Dam.

Due to their age; Mavuzi HPP was commissioned in 1957, and Chicamba HPP was established in 1968, many replacement parts are not available on the market anymore and maintenance was a challenge in the 21st century. For a period of 3.5 years, beginning in 2013 until February 2017, both stations underwent refurbishment and upgrades, with the contractor manufacturing new hardware to replace what could not purchased on the open market.

== Refurbishment and improvements ==
The refurbishment contract was awarded to a consortium comprising Rainpower, a Norwegian supplier of hydroelectricity generating hardware and Cegelec, a French engineering company. Other entities included Hydrokarst, a French company that socializes in underwater inspection and installations.

== Construction costs ==
The rehabilitation bill in 2017 for both and Mavuzi HPP and Chicamba HPP is quoted as US$120 million (€90 million at that time). The sources of funding are illustrated in the table below:

Funding Sources for Mavuzi and Chicamba Hydroelectric Power Plants Rehabilitation
Rank	Funder	Amount in Euros	US $ Equivalent	Percentage	Notes
1	Swedish International Development Cooperation Agency	30.00 million	40.0 million	33.3	Loan
2	KfW	15.8 million	21.2 million	17.6	Loan
3	Agence Française de Développement (AFD)	44.2 million	58.8 million	49.1	Loan
	All	90 million	120 million	100.00	Total

== See also ==
- List of power stations in Mozambique
