= Chicamba Hydroelectric Power Station =

Power station in Mozambique

- Map of Mozambique showing the location of Chicamba Power Station
- Country: Mozambique
- Location: Chicamba, Manica Province
- Coordinates: 19°09′21″S 33°08′42″E
- Purpose: Power
- Status: Operational
- Owner: Government of Mozambique
- Operator: Electricidade de Mozambique

Dam and spillways
- Impounds: Revue River

Reservoir
- Normal elevation: 625 m (2,051 ft)

Power Station
- Commission date: 1968 & 2017
- Turbines: 2 x 22 MW (Francis)
- Installed capacity: 44 MW (59,000 hp)

The Chicamba Hydroelectric Power Station is an operational 44 megawatts (59,000 hp) hydroelectric power project in Mozambique. The power plant, first established in 1968, underwent rehabilitation and upgrades in 2017, raising its generating capacity, from 38.4 megawatts to 44 megawatts, with prolongation of its lifespan by another thirty years.

== Location ==
The power station is located at Chicamba, across the Ruvue River, in Manica Province, near the international border between Mozambique and Zimbabwe. This location is approximately 50 kilometres (31 mi), by road, south-east of the town of Manica, where the provincial capital is located. Chicamba is located about 250 kilometres (155 mi), by road, northwest of the city of Beira, the nearest large city. The geographical coordinates of Chicamba HPP are: 19°09'21.0"S, 33°08'42.0"E (Latitude:-19.155833; Longitude:33.145000).

== Overview ==
Chicamba Power Station (44 megawatts) and the nearby Mavuzi Hydroelectric Power Station (41 megawatts), both located in Manica Province were intended to supply electricity to the provinces of Manica and neighboring Sofala, supplemented with power obtained from the Cahora Bassa Dam.

Due to their age; Chicamba HPP was commissioned in 1968 and Mavuzi HPP was established in 1957, much of the original hardware is not available on the market and maintenance was a challenge in the 21st century. For a period of 3.5 years, beginning in 2013 until February 2017, both stations underwent refurbishment and upgrades, with the contractor manufacturing new hardware to replace what could not be purchased on the open market.

== Refurbishment and improvements ==
The refurbishment contract was awarded to a consortium comprising Rainpower, a Norwegian supplier of hydroelectricity generating hardware and Cegelec, a French engineering company. Other entities included Hydrokarst, a French company that socializes in underwater inspection and installations.

== Construction costs ==
The rehabilitation bill in 2017 for both Chicamba HPP and Mavuzi HPP is quoted as US$120 million (€90 million at that time). The sources of funding are illustrated in the table below:

Funding Sources for Mavuzi and Chicamba Hydroelectric Power Plants Rehabilitation
| Rank | Funder | Amount in Euros | US $ Equivalent | Percentage | Notes |
|---|---|---|---|---|---|
| 1 | Swedish International Development Cooperation Agency | 30.00 million | 40.0 million | 33.3 | Loan |
| 2 | KfW | 15.8 million | 21.2 million | 17.6 | Loan |
| 3 | Agence Française de Développement (AFD) | 44.2 million | 58.8 million | 49.1 | Loan |
| | All | 90 million | 120 million | 100.00 | Total |

== See also ==
- List of power stations in Mozambique
