= Kapenta =

Fish species

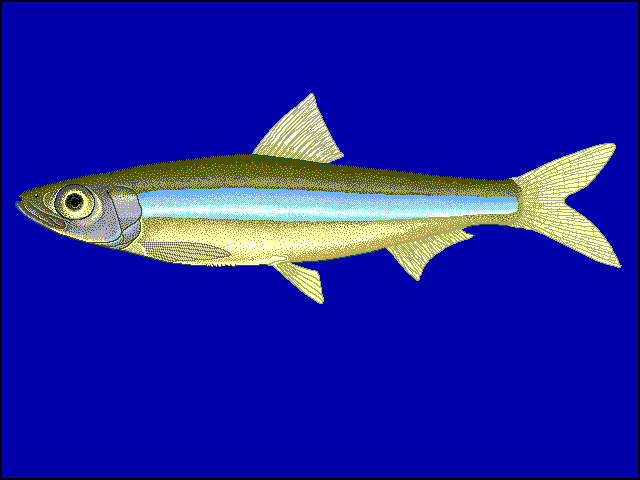
Limnothrissa miodon

The Tanganyika sardine is a term for two related species (Lake Tanganyika sardine, Limnothrissa miodon and Lake Tanganyika sprat, Stolothrissa tanganicae), both of which are small, planktivorous, pelagic, freshwater clupeid originating from Lake Tanganyika in Zambia. They form the major biomass of pelagic fish in Lake Tanganyika and Lake Malawi, swimming in large schools in the open lake, feeding on copepods and potentially jellyfish. Their major predators are four species of Lates which are also endemic to Lake Tanganyika, and are related to (but not the same as) the Nile perch in Lake Victoria. All of these pelagic fish have suffered from overfishing in the last two decades.

The fish is known as kapenta or matemba in Zambia, Malawi and Zimbabwe, "Ndagala" or "Lumpu" in Burundi and Isambaza in Rwanda. (A related but different fish, known as dagaa or ndaga, is Rastrineobola argentea.)

Limnothrissa miodon has been successfully introduced in both natural and artificial African lakes. Large kapenta fisheries now take place in the Lake Kariba (Zambia/Zimbabwe) and Cahora Bassa (Mozambique).

Limnothrissa miodon is usually around 10 cm long, its maximum length is 17 cm. Stolothrissa tanganicae is smaller at 7 cm (maximum 10 cm).

== Etymology ==
When the wealth of the fishermen flourished after the introduction of the clupeid fish, a number of prostitutes attached themselves to the fishers. These women used AMBI cream to lighten their features. They became known as the ba-ka-penta, or those that paint themselves. The fish then came to be called kapenta.

== Fishing ==
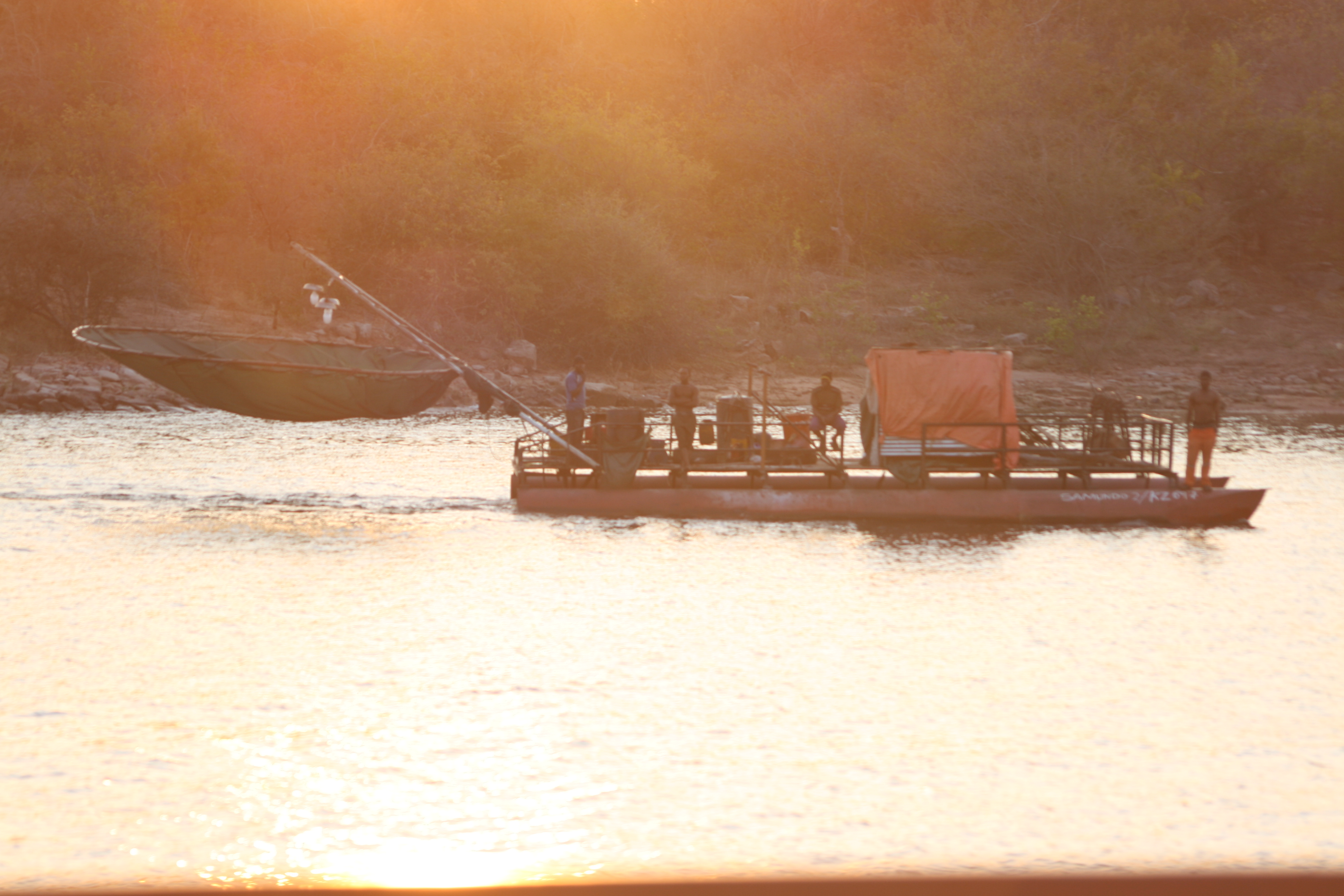
Kapenta rig

This fish is caught at night using kapenta rigs; these rigs use LED lights or kerosene lamps to attract the fish to the rig. A dip net measuring roughly six metres in diameter and around 8 to 10 metres in length is then used to bring the fish up from anything from 40 metres (130 ft).

=== Sustainability ===
In recent years there has been a steady decline in the kapenta population. In order to maintain the kapenta population certain countries have made it illegal to fish for kapenta in shallow water (less than 20 metres), as the kapenta breed in this shallow water, and have introduced licences to control and monitor fishing.

== Food ==
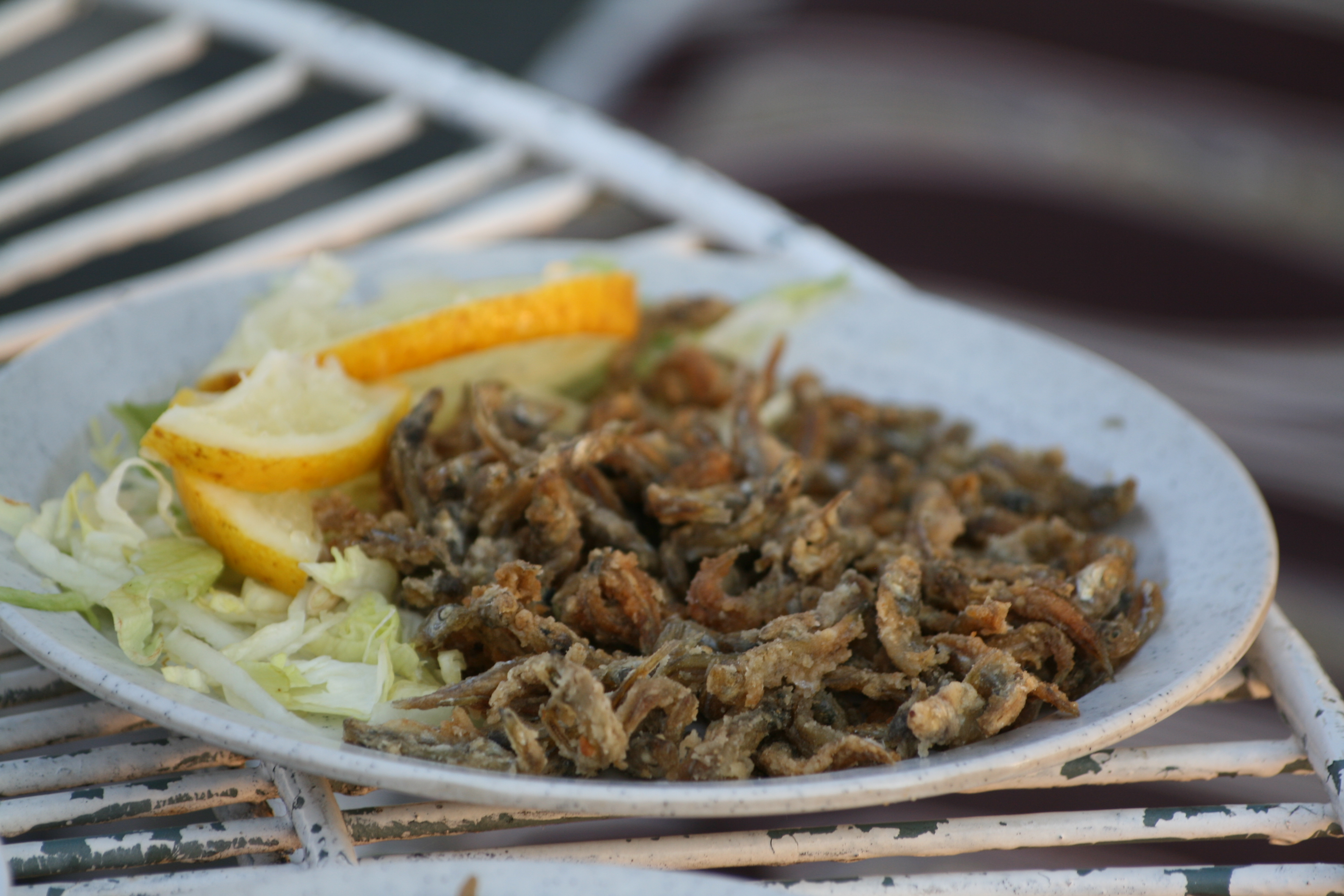
Deep-fried kapenta fish

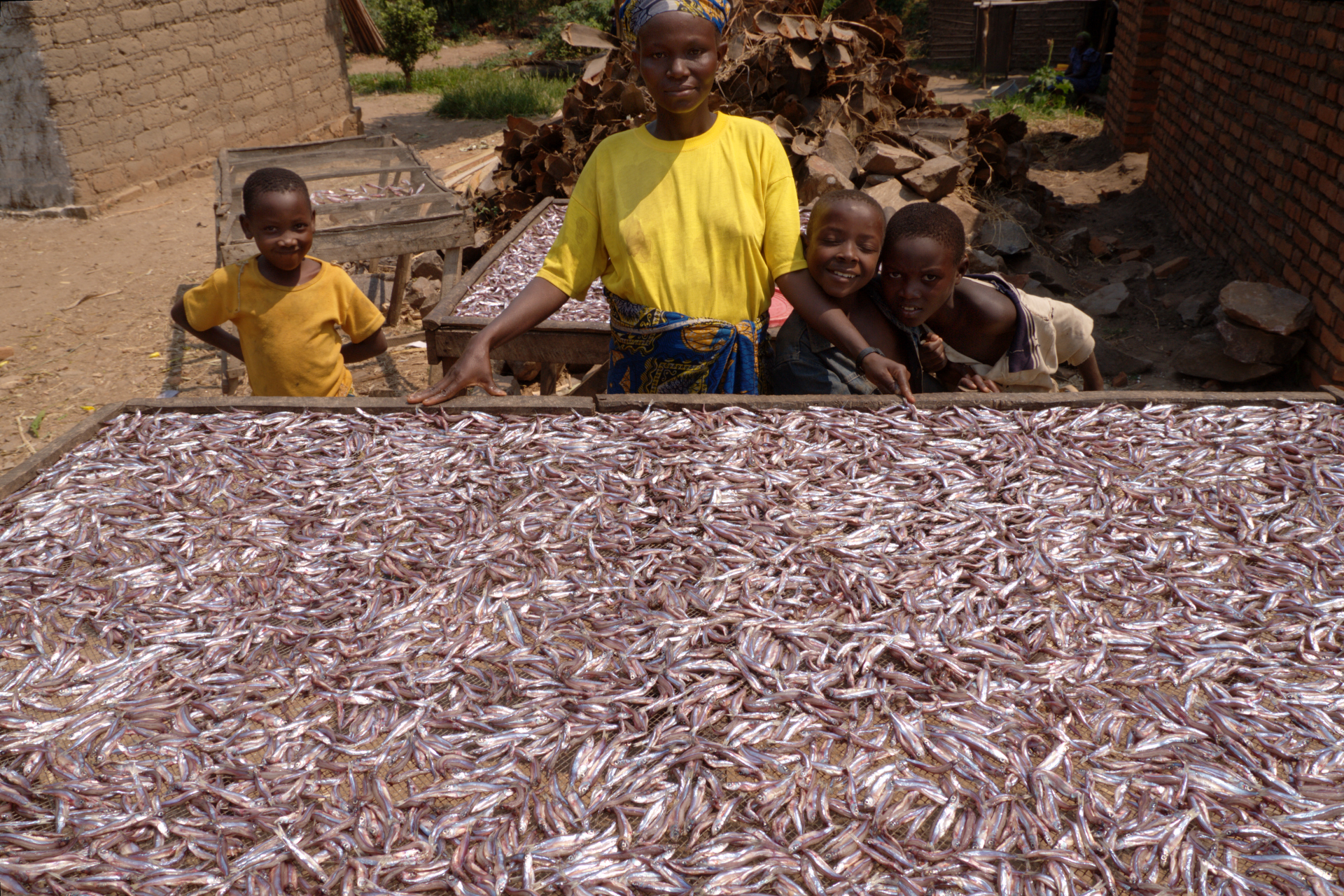
Kapenta fish drying in the sun

Kapenta is usually dried in the sun on a clean surface such as concrete slabs, rocks or netting. Drying on racks gives the best results. Drying takes one day or more, depending on the weather. Unfortunately, the kapenta season coincides with the rainy season when the fish congregates, and sundrying may not always be possible, causing post-harvest losses. These losses are mostly economical as lower-quality dried fish fetches a lower price. In the worst case the dried fish is used as chicken feed. Salting before drying is a solution: kapenta is salted at a ratio normally of 2.5 kg per 30 kg (1 lb per 12 lb) of fish, and dried in the hot Zambezi Valley sun. It is a highly important staple, providing refrigeration-free protein to people of Africa. A cup of dried kapenta will feed a family. Dried kapenta is preferred to the slightly bitter dried dagaa from Lake Victoria, but poor people will buy dagaa because of its lower price.

In Zimbabwe, dried kapenta fish are shallow-fried with onions, tomatoes and groundnut powder. They are eaten with the traditional staple cornmeal dish called isitshwala or sadza.

Fresh kapenta is also packed in plastic pouches and frozen. Frozen kapenta is popular but more expensive than dried kapenta. Fresh kapenta is not sold in markets, except in fishing villages.

In the 1960s and 1970s, some fishery development projects experimented with smoke-dried kapenta, salted or not, but this never caught on.

Marinated kapenta can be made from kapenta fillets put in vinegar with salt and kept in a refrigerator. After two or three days the vinegar is discarded and the fish is quickly rinsed with clean water. Then the fillets are put in a mix of olive oil, vinegar, sugar, garlic, chili peppers, and much parsley or celery. After another two or three days in the fridge, the marinated fillets are ready to eat.

It is an important bait fish for the African tigerfish (family Alestidae) and, although introduced in Kariba and Cahora Bassa, does not seem to have harmed the environment.

It is an important contributor to the economies of the areas it is caught in.
