= Chimuara Solar Power Station =

Solar farm in Mozambique

- Country: Mozambique
- Location: Chimuara, Zambezia Province
- Coordinates: 17°46′41″S 35°24′05″E
- Status: Proposed
- Owner: SunMoz
- Operator: SunMoz

Solar farm
- Type: Flat-panel PV
- Site area: 250 hectares (618 acres)

Power generation
- Nameplate capacity: 100 megawatts (130,000 hp)

The Chimuara Solar Power Station, is a planned 100 megawatts (130,000 hp) solar power plant in Mozambique. The solar farm is under development by a consortium of two independent power producers and one investment company. The developers have created a special purpose vehicle (SPV) company called SunMoz, to design, build, own, operate and maintain the power station and related infrastructure. The energy generated here will be sold to Electricidade de Moçambique (EDM), for integration into the Mozambican grid, under a long-term power purchase agreement.

== Location ==
The power station is located in the town of Chimuara, in the Zambezia Province, on the northern bank of the Zambezi River. This is close to the border with Sofala Province, approximately 198 kilometres (123 mi) west of the coastal city of Quelimane, the Zambezia provincial capital. SunMoz has obtained a piece of real estate measuring 250 hectares (620 acres) on which the solar farm will sit.

== Overview ==
The design calls for a generation capacity of 100 megawatts, which will be sold directly to EDM, the electric utility company of Mozambique, for integration in the national electricity grid. EDM owns an electric substation in Chimuara, where the energy will be injected into the national grid. The power station will be developed in phases, with the first phase to comprise 30 MW.

== Developers ==
The consortium that owns and is developing the solar farm has created an SPV company called SunMoz, to build own and operate the power station. The table below illustrates the shareholding in SunMoz.

Shareholding In SunMoz
Rank	Shareholder	Domicile	Percentage	Notes
1	SolarCentury Africa	United Kingdom		
2	Renewable Energy Services Africa (RESA)	South Africa		
3	Checunda Investimentos	Mozambique		
	Total		100.00	

== See also ==
- List of power stations in Mozambique
