= List of power stations in Mozambique =

This article lists all power stations in Mozambique.

== Hydroelectric ==
Hydroelectric station	Community	Coordinates	Type	Capacity (MW)	Year completed	Name of reservoir	River
Cahora Bassa Dam			Reservoir	2,075	1975	Cahora Bassa Lake	Zambezi River
Chicamba Hydroelectric Power Station	Chicamba, Manica Province	19.155833°S 33.145000°E	Reservoir	44	1968	Chicamba Reservoir	Revue River
Massingir Hydroelectric Power Station		23.872222°S 32.148611°E	Reservoir	25	2007	Massingir Lake	Olifants River
Mavuzi Hydroelectric Power Station	Costina, Manica Province	19.526111°S 33.493056°E	Run of river	41	1957	N/A	Revue River

== Thermal ==
Thermal power station	Community	Coordinates	Fuel type	Capacity (megawatts)	Year completed or completion expected	Name of owner	Notes
Ressano Garcia Thermal Power Station	Ressano Garcia, Moamba District, Maputo Province	25.461667°S 32.005278°E	Natural gas	175	February 2016	EDM & Sasol	
Temane Thermal Power Station	Temane, Inhambane Province	21.751944°S 35.063889°E	Natural gas	450	2022 (expected)	Temane Energy Consortium	

== Solar ==
Partial list of solar power stations in Mozambique.

Solar power station	Community	Coordinates	Fuel type	Capacity (megawatts)	Year completed	Name of owner	Notes
Metoro Solar Power Station	Cabo Delgado Province	13°04′42″S 39°50′11″E	Solar	41	2022	Metoro Solar Consortium	
Cuamba Solar Power Station	Niassa Province	14°48′22″S 36°34′24″E	Solar	20	2023	Cuamba Solar Company	
Dondo Solar Power Station	Sofala Province	19°35′13″S 34°42′23″E	Solar	40	2023 (expected)	Total Eren	
Mocuba Solar Power Station	Zambezia Province	16°49′22″S 37°02′05″E	Solar	40	2019	Mocuba Solar Energy Consortium	
Nacala Solar Power Station	Nampula Province	14°28′57″S 40°43′13″E	Solar	100	TBD	WHN Solar Company	
Lichinga Solar Power Station	Niassa Province	13°17′56″S 35°13′56″E	Solar	50	TBD	Gigawatt Solar Consortium	
Balama Solar Power Station	Cabo Delgado Province	13°18′22″S 38°40′01″E	Solar	11.25	2023 (expected)	CrossBoundary Energy	

== See also ==
- List of power stations in Africa
- List of largest power stations in the world
