= Temane Thermal Power Station =

Thermal power station in Mozambique

- Country: Mozambique
- Location: Temane, Inhambane Province
- Coordinates: 21°45′07″S 35°03′50″E
- Status: Under construction
- Construction began: 2021 Expected
- Commission date: 2022 Expected
- Construction cost: US $750 million
- Owner: Temane Energy Consortium
- Operator: Electricidade de Moçambique

Thermal power station
- Primary fuel: Natural gas

Power generation
- Nameplate capacity: 450 MW (600,000 hp)

Temane Thermal Power Station, is a 450 megawatts (600,000 hp) natural gas power plant under construction in Mozambique. When completed, the energy generated will be purchased by Electricidade de Moçambique (EDM), the government-owned electric utility company, under a long-term power purchase agreement.

== Location ==
The power station is located in the town of Temane, in Inhambane Province in southern Mozambique. Temane is situated about 312 kilometres (194 mi), by road, north of the city of Inhambane, where the provincial capital is located. This is approximately 734 kilometres (456 mi), by road, northeast of the city of Maputo, the capital of Mozambique.

== Developers ==
The power station is under development by a consortium comprising the corporate entities illustrated in the table below:

Temane Thermal Power Station Developers
Rank	Development Partner	Domicile	Relationship
1	Globeleq	United Kingdom	Equity Investor
2	eleQtra	United Kingdom	Equity Investor
3	EDM	Mozambique	Equity Investor
4	Sasol Africa Limited	South Africa	Equity Investor

== History ==
This power project was originally owned by EDM of Mozambique and Sasol New Energy Holdings of South Africa. In December 2020, the owner/developers brought on Globeleq and eleQtra. The consortium jointly formed a special purpose vehicle company to develop this power station, which they named Temane Energy Consortium (TEC). Financial closure was achieved in December 2020. The power station will be designed and constructed by TSK Electronica y Electricidad S.A. (TSK Group), a Spanish electronic and electricity construction company.

== Funding ==
The table below illustrates the funding sources for the Temane Thermal Power Station. The list of funders may not be complete.

Temane Thermal Power Station Funding
Rank	Development Partner	Contribution in Euros	Percentage	Notes
1	The World Bank Group	420 million		Grant & Guarantees
2	U.S. International Development Finance Corporation	200 million		Loan
3	OPEC Fund	50 million		Loan
4	Temane Energy Consortium			Owner/Developer Consortium
5	Government of Mozambique			Equity Investor
	Total	750 million	100.00	

== Associated developments ==
In addition to the natural gas-powered electricity generating plant, as part of the same development, 563 kilometres (350 mi) of associated transmission infrastructure will be established to distribute the energy generated to neighboring communities and where possible sell any excess to the Southern Africa Power Pool.

It is expected that when this power station comes online in 2022, a portion of the energy generated here, amounting to 100 megawatts, will be sold to Botswana Power Corporation (BPC), under a one-year power purchase agreement signed in April 2022, between EDM and BPC, in Gaborone, Botswana.

== See also ==
- List of power stations in Mozambique
