= Ndagala =

Ndagala ( Burundi ) or Daaga ( Tanzania ) are the vernacular names given to two species of small pelagic fish of the Clupeidae family (which also includes Sardines and Shads), which are only found in Lake Tanganyika.

Limnothrissa miodon is a large species, typically 10–12 centimetres (3.9–4.7 in) long, zooplanktonophagous, with a coastal pelagic character. It lives for about two years. It is called “Lumpu” in Burundi and Isambaza in Rwanda. Stolothrissa tanganicae is a small species, typically 6–8 centimetres (2.4–3.1 in) long, planktivorous, called Ndagala in the Swahili language, and living further offshore. It lives for one to one and a half years.

Although technically fishing of the two species is banned, in practice it continues. The Ndagala are caught all year round, and are an important part of the local people's diet.

== Sources ==
- Collart, Alphonse (1989), Introduction et acclimatation de l'Isambaza du lac Tanganyika au lac Kivu, FAO
- "Les Poissons du Lac Tanganyika : Ndagala, Mukeke, Sangala, Tilapia et Plus Encore", Burundi Travel (in French)
