= Ressano Garcia Thermal Power Station =

Power station in Mozambique

- Country: Mozambique
- Location: Ressano Garcia, Moamba District, Maputo Province
- Coordinates: 25°27′42″S 32°00′19″E
- Status: Operational
- Commission date: February 2016
- Owner: Electricidade de Moçambique & Sasol

Thermal power station
- Primary fuel: Natural gas

Power generation
- Nameplate capacity: 175 MW (235,000 hp)

External links
- Website: ctrg.co.mz

Ressano Garcia Thermal Power Station is a 175 MW (235,000 hp) natural gas-fired thermal power plant located in the town of Ressano Garcia in the Maputo Province of Mozambique.

== Location ==
The power station is located in the town of Ressano Garcia, in the Moamba District of Maputo Province. This is in extreme southwestern Mozambique, adjacent to the international border with South Africa. Ressano Garcia sits across the border from the town of Komatipoort, in Mpumalanga Province, South Africa, approximately 96 kilometres (60 mi), northwest of the city of Maputo, the capital of Mozambique. The coordinates of the power station are 25°27'42.0"S, 32°00'19.0"E (Latitude:-25.461667; Longitude:32.005278).

== Overview ==
The power station is jointly owned by (a) Electricidade de Moçambique, the Mozambican electricity utility monopoly company and (b) Sasol New Energy, a 100 percent subsidiary of Sasol Limited, a South Africa-based chemical and energy conglomerate. The table below illustrates the shareholding in the power station, as of January 2021.

Ressano Garcia Thermal Power Station Stock Ownership
Rank	Name of Owner	Percentage Ownership
1	Electricidade de Moçambique (EDM)	51.0
2	Sasol New Energy	49.0
	Total	100.00

The power station uses natural gas, sourced from Mozambican gas fields, conveyed to the plant via the Temane–Secunda Gas Pipeline that transports the gas from Temane, in the Mozambican gas fields, to Secunda in South Africa.

== Construction ==
The engineering, procurement and construction (EPC) contract was awarded to Gigawatt Mozambique, SA, a subsidiary of South African-based Gigajoule Group, a company that develops, operates and invests in sustainable energy projects in Southern Africa.

The power station was designed to have maximum capacity of 350 megawatts. Since 2015, it has been gradually, progressively built and expanded to reach capacity of 175 megawatts. As of August 2020, US$280 million had been invested so far to that stage, including US$200 spent on construction.

== Operation ==
The power station sells the energy it produces to the national utility company, Electricidade de Moçambique, under a 25-year power purchase agreement. The natural gas that the plant burns to produce the electricity, is supplied by Matola Gas Company, another subsidiary of the Gigajoule Group. The electricity supplies (a) the city of Maputo (b) Maputo Province and (c) some is sold to the Southern African Power Pool. Plans are underway to expand the power station to 350 megawatts.

In December 2017, the power station was re-financed to the tune of US$189 million. The table below identifies the sources of funds for the refinance:

Ressano Garcia Thermal Power Station Refinance
Rank	Lender	Loan in US Dollars	Percentage
1	International Finance Corporation	55.0 million	29.1
2	Emerging Africa Infrastructure Fund	21.0 million	11.1
3	FMO Entrepreneurial Development Bank	21.0 million	11.1
4	Absa Group Limited	42.0 million	22.2
5	PROPARCO	50.0 million	26.5
	Total	189.0 million	100.0

== Change in ownership ==
In December 2020, Sasol Limited, the minority shareholder in this power station, signed binding paperwork, transferring its 49 percent shareholding to Azura Power Limited of Nigeria, for consideration of US$145 million. The transaction is subject to regulatory approval in Mozambique and is subordinate to first right of refusal (pre-emption rights) by the majority shareholder, EDM.

== See also ==
- List of power stations in Mozambique
