= Cahora Bassa (HVDC) =

HVDC power transmission system

Cahora Bassa HVDC
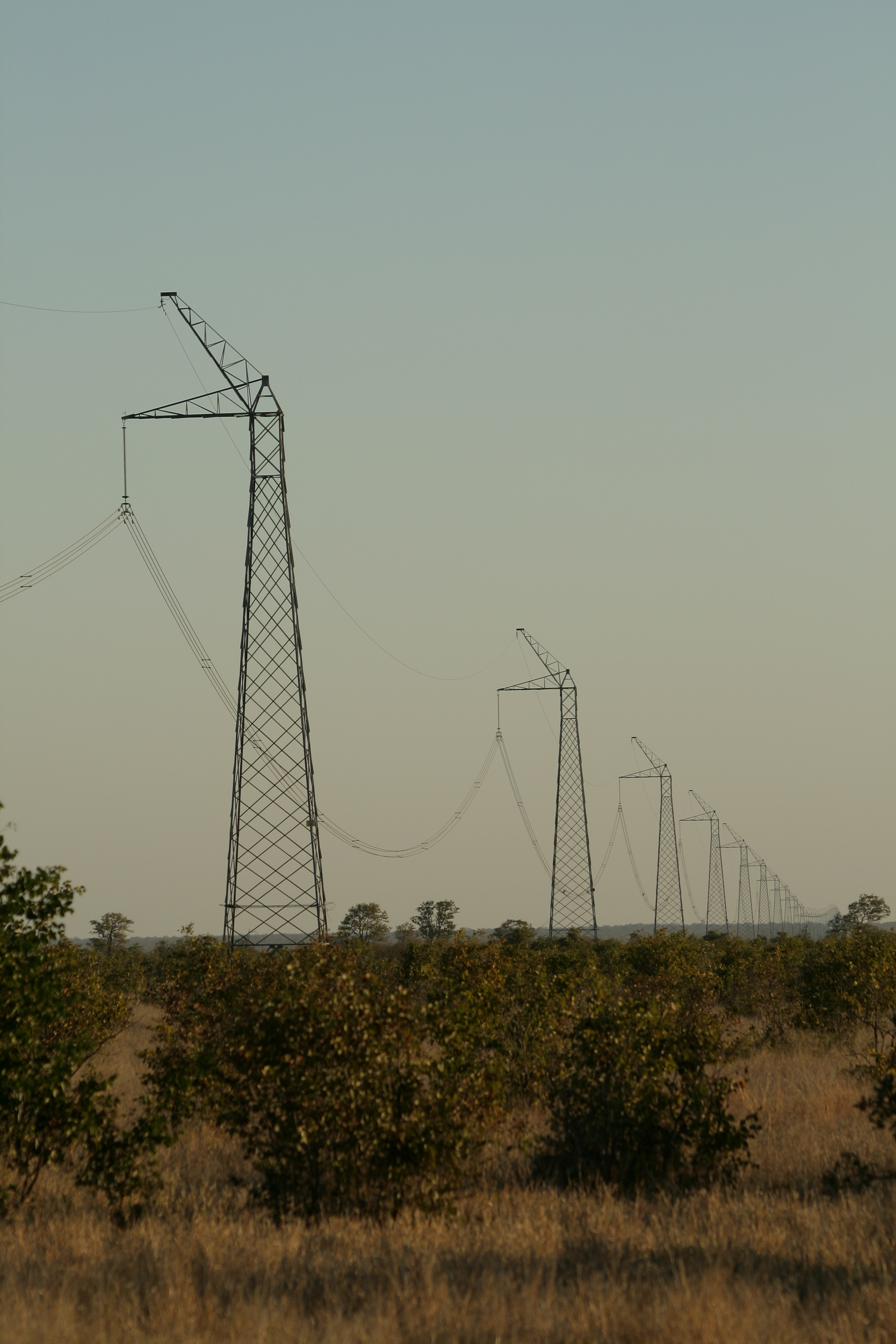
- The southern line crossing through the Kruger National Park
- Route of the Cahora Bassa HVDC scheme

Location
- Country: Mozambique, South Africa
- Coordinates: 15°36′41″S 32°44′59″E; 25°55′11″S 28°16′34″E
- From: Cahora Bassa Dam, Mozambique
- To: Johannesburg, South Africa

Ownership information
- Owner: Eskom, Hidroelectrica de Cahora Bassa (HCB)

Construction information
- Substation manufacturer: AEG-Telefunken, Brown Boveri Company, Siemens (original equipment); ABB (upgrade)
- Commissioned: 1977–1979

Technical information
- Type: overhead line
- Current type: HVDC
- Total length: 1,420 km (880 mi)
- Capacity: 1920 MW
- DC voltage: ±533 kV
- No. of poles: 2

Cahora-Bassa (previously spelled Cabora Bassa) is a separate bipolar HVDC power transmission line between the Cahora Bassa Hydroelectric Generation Station at the Cahora Bassa Dam in Mozambique, and Johannesburg, South Africa.

== History ==
The system was built between 1974 and 1979 and can transmit 1920 megawatts at a voltage level of 533 kilovolts DC and 1800 Amperes. Thyristor valves are used, which unlike most other HVDC schemes are mounted outdoors and not in a valve hall. The valves are grouped into eight, 133 kV six-pulse bridges in series at each end. The 1,420 kilometres (880 mi) long powerline runs through inaccessible terrain, so it is mostly built as monopolar lines 1 kilometre (0.62 mi) apart. In case of a single line failure, transmission with reduced power is possible via the surviving pole and return through the earth.

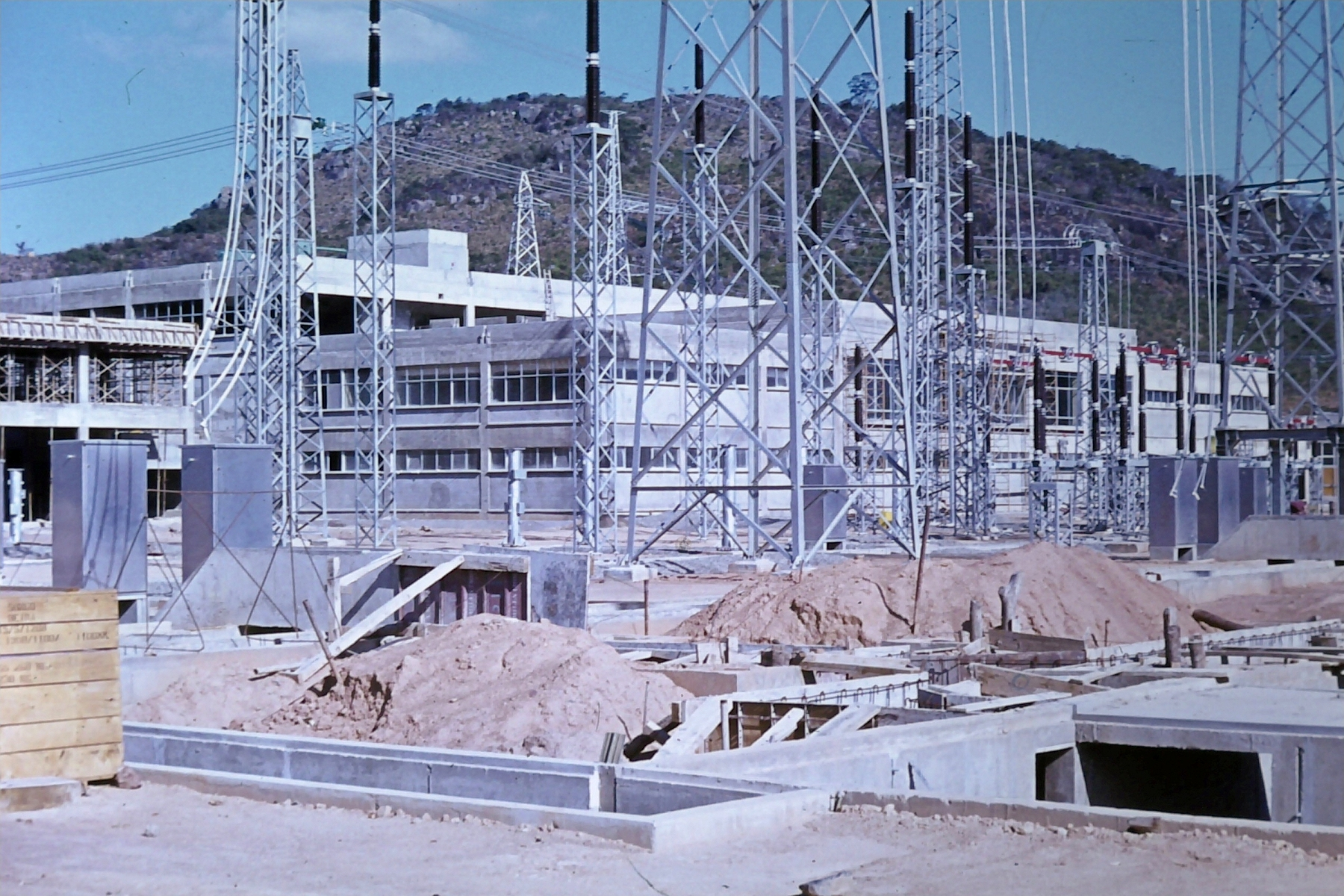
The Cahora Bassa HVDC power station under construction in 1974

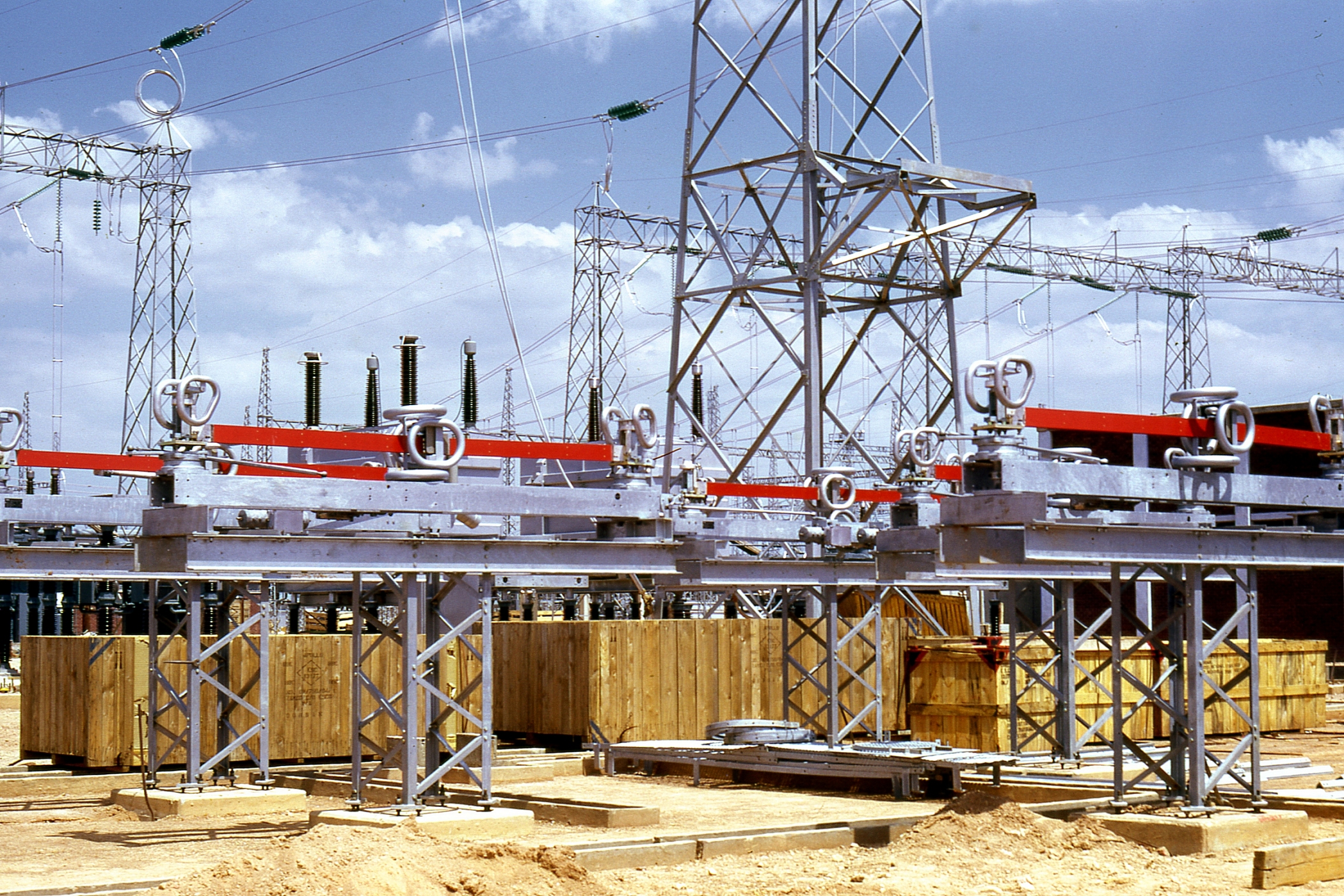
The Apollo converter station under construction in late 1973

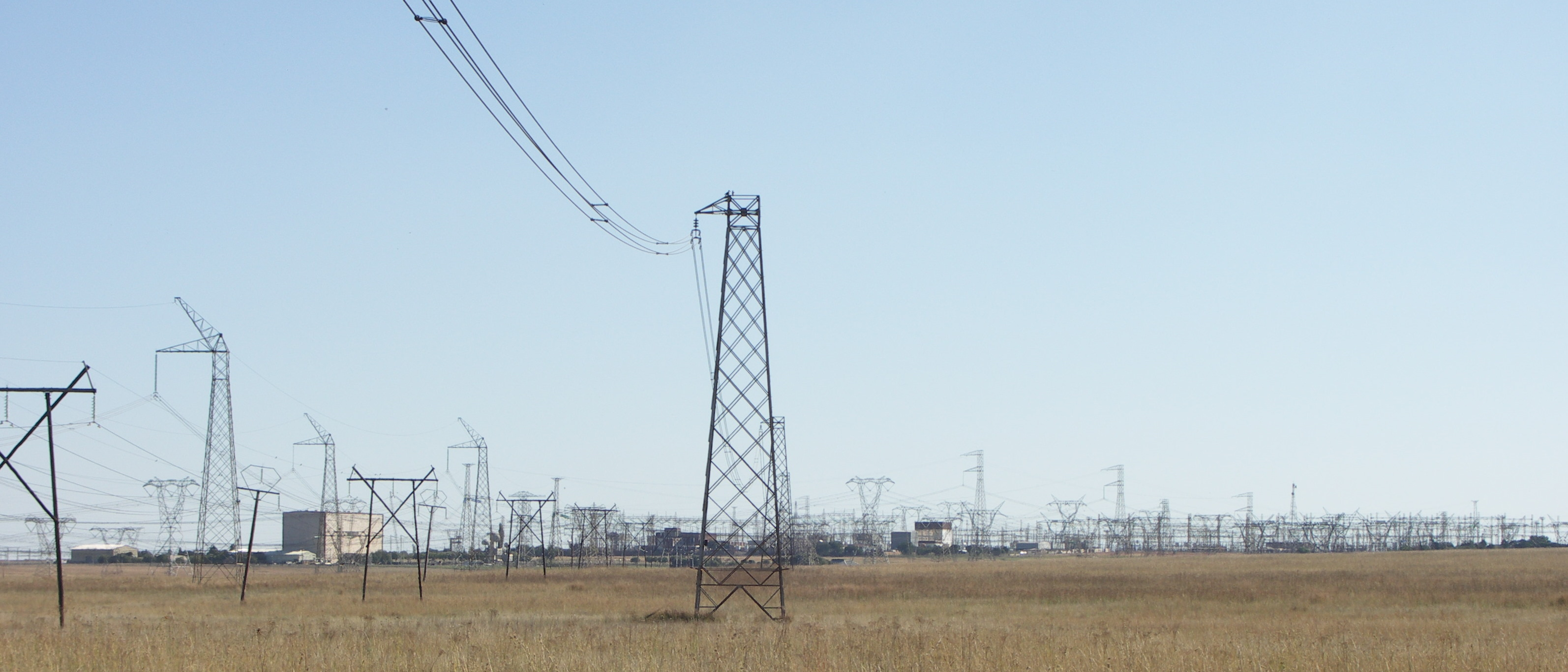
The Apollo HVDC converter station and distribution lines. The Cahora Bassa HVDC line can be seen as the tall pylons on the left. The line in the centre of the picture with a single conductor is the electrode line of HVDC Cahora Bassa.

Cahora-Bassa was out of service from 1985 to 1997 because of the Mozambican Civil War in the region. The project was beset with technological challenges, most notable of these being the adoption of solid-state rectification devices in a large-scale commercial installation. Mercury-arc valves had been the de facto standard for HVDC up to this time. Cahora Bassa was the first HVDC scheme ordered with thyristor valves, though its operation was delayed. It was also the first HVDC scheme operational in Africa, and the first anywhere in the world to operate above 500 kV. Significant commercial hurdles, culminating in hearings at an International Arbitration Tribunal seated in Lisbon, in 1988, also had to be overcome.

Following a refurbishment exercise, the scheme was put back into commercial operation in October 1997. Between 2006 and 2009 the thyristor valves at the Apollo converter station were replaced by more modern water-cooled thyristor valves.

== Description ==
=== Construction and ownership ===
The Cahora-Bassa transmission project was a joint venture of the two electrical utilities, Electricity Supply Commission (ESCOM, as it was known prior to 1987), latterly Eskom, Johannesburg, South Africa and Hidroelectrica de Cahora Bassa (HCB), a firm owned 15% by the government of Portugal and 85% by Mozambique. Equipment was constructed and supplied by ZAMCO, which was a consortium of AEG-Telefunken JV, Brown Boveri Company, and Siemens of Germany. Brown Boveri subsequently became part of ABB and AEG subsequently became part of Alstom.

The commercial arrangements also included Electricidade de Moçambique (EDM) which took supply from Cahora Bassa through a wheeling arrangement with Eskom. Effectively, Eskom supplied southern Mozambique (Maputo) from the then Eastern Transvaal at 132 kV with the sales deducted from the HCB supply to Eskom. The tripartite agreement was suspended due to force majeure when the line from Cahora Bassa was unavailable in the 1980s.

The system was commissioned in three stages starting in March 1977 with four six-pulse bridges, and in full operation of eight bridges on 15 March 1979.

=== Transmission line ===
The power line runs from the Songo converter station, which is near the hydroelectric station and normally operates as a rectifier, to the Apollo converter station near Johannesburg, which normally operates as an inverter. Each of the self-supporting steel towers along the route carries two bundles of four 565 square millimetre (1120 kcmil) cables, and a single 117 square millimetre (231 kcmil) grounding conductor. There are approximately 7,000 towers with an average span of 426 metres (466 yd).

The maximum span is 700 metres (770 yd) using reinforced towers. Earth return for unipolar operation is provided by buried graphite electrodes at each station. The DC line has smoothing reactors and surge arrester capacitors at each station.

Northeast of Apollo Converter Station the poles of HVDC Cahora Bassa cross under several 400 kV AC lines at 25°54'58"S 28°16'46"E respectively 25°54'57"S 28°16'51"E in such a low height that the area under the line may not be walked on and is fenced in .

The two lines are named as Zeus and Apollo respectively.

=== Thyristor valves ===
Cahora Bassa was one of the first HVDC schemes built with thyristor valves from its inception. Unusually, the thyristor valves are outdoor mounted. In the original installation they were oil filled for both cooling and electrical insulation. The only other HVDC scheme in the world equipped in this way from the outset was the first phase – now decommissioned – of the Shin Shinano frequency converter in Japan. Each valve tank contains two valves, forming a double-valve connecting the two DC terminals to one single-phase, two-winding converter transformer. Each six-pulse bridge contains three such tanks and hence each station contains 24 double-valves.

The development work for the thyristor valves began in the late 1960s when the only thyristors available at the time were, by today's standards, small, and were rated only 1.6 kV each. In the first phase of the project (4 bridges at each end) each valve contained 280 such thyristors in series with two in parallel – the largest number ever used in a single HVDC valve.

Phases 2 and 3 used improved thyristors with a rating of 2.4 kV each and only required 192 in series per valve – still a large number by modern standards – with two in parallel. As a result, each converter station contained a total of 22,656 thyristors.

=== Other equipment ===
The thyristors also had poor transient overcurrent capability, so another unusual feature of the scheme was the existence of overcurrent diverters between the valves and transformers, although these were later decommissioned at the Apollo station.

AC filters tuned to the 5th, 7th, 11th and 13th harmonics of the 50 Hz power supply are installed at each station, approximately 195 MVAr at Apollo and 210 MVAr at Songo.

There are two PLC repeater stations: one at Gamaboi in South Africa and one at Catope in Mozambique.

== Repairing the war damage ==
After the civil war ended in 1992, one of the many effects of the decade of strife was the damage to the HVDC transmission lines. Nearly all of the 4200 transmission line towers located on the 893 kilometres (555 mi) of line in Mozambique needed to be replaced or refurbished. This work was started in 1995 and took until late 1997 to complete. The system was restored to full power transmission capacity by 1998.

Subsequently, Eskom has commenced electricity supply to Mozambique at 400 kV, under terms similar to the original wheeling agreement, from the Arnot Power Station in Mpumalanga, via Swaziland. The principal purpose of this infrastructure is to provide bulk electricity supplies to the Mozal Aluminium Smelter operated by South32.

The Memorandum of Understanding, signed on 2 November 2007, means that Mozambique will by the end of 2007 be in charge of a project located on its soil but on which it had no control for the past 30 years due to contractual obligations with Portugal.

The new arrangement gives Mozambique 85 percent of the Cahora Bassa Hydroelectric (HCB) project while Portugal will retain only 15 percent. The project has a capacity to produce 2,000 megawatts of electricity and is one of the main suppliers of power to the Southern African Power Pool.

Mozambique will, however, need to pay US$950 million to the Portuguese government as compensation for the post civil-war reconstruction and maintenance of the dam.

The civil war resulted in serious damage to the transmission infrastructure, forcing the Portuguese government to pay about US$2.5 billion out of pocket to repair it.

== Apollo station upgrade ==
In 2006 ABB was awarded a contract to replace the thyristor valves at the Apollo station. The outdoor mounting concept was retained, but each of the new housings contains a complete six-pulse bridge instead of only two valves, and the replacement thyristor valves are of a more conventional air insulated, water-cooled design using 125mm, 8.5 kV thyristors. 36 such thyristors are connected in series in each valve, without parallel connection, and the new valves are capable of a subsequent upgrade to 600 kV, 3300 A. At the same time, the AC filters were replaced.

== Sites ==
Site	Coordinates
Apollo Inverter Station	25°55′11″S 28°16′34″E
South African Electrode Line Terminal	25°50′04″S 28°24′02″E
Gamaboi PLC Repeater Station	23°55′36″S 29°38′32″E
Pole 1 crosses border between South Africa and Mozambique	22°32′06″S 31°20′39″E
Pole 2 crosses border between South Africa and Mozambique	22°31′15″S 31°20′22″E
Catope PLC Repeater Station	18°01′00″S 33°12′18″E
Mozambican Electrode Line Terminal	15°43′20″S 32°49′04″E
Songo Converter Station	15°36′41″S 32°44′59″E

== Gallery ==
- Media related to Cahora Bassa (HVDC) at Wikimedia Commons

== See also ==
- High-voltage direct current
- HVDC converter
- HVDC converter station
- Cahora Bassa
- Cahora Bassa Dam
- Energy in Mozambique
- Electricity sector in South Africa
- List of HVDC projects
