= Cuamba Solar Power Station =

Solar farm in Mozambique

- Country: Mozambique
- Location: Cuamba, Niassa Province
- Coordinates: 14°48′01″S 36°30′22″E
- Status: Under construction
- Construction began: 2021
- Commission date: September 2023
- Owner: Cuamba Solar Company

Solar farm
- Type: Flat-panel PV

Power generation
- Nameplate capacity: 20 megawatts (27,000 hp)

Cuamba Solar Power Station (CSPS), is a 20 megawatts (27,000 hp) solar power plant in Mozambique. The power station was developed by a consortium that comprises a British independent power producer and a Mauritian investor. A storage system consisting of lithium batteries with a capacity of 1.86 MVA/7.42 MW/h, is incorporated in the design. The storage system regulates the rate of delivery of the power into the national grid and thereby stabilize the network. TSK Group, a Spanish engineering and construction conglomerate was awarded the engineering, procurement, and construction (EPC) contract in May 2021.

== Location ==
CSPS is located approximately 3 kilometres (2 mi), outside of the town of Cuamba, in Niassa Province, in the north of Mozambique. Cuamba is located approximately 347 kilometres (216 mi), by road, southeast of the city of Lichinga, the provincial capital. This is about 541 kilometres (336 mi), by road, west of the port city of Nacala, the nearest sea-port. The geographical location of Cuamba Solar Power Station are: 14°48'01.0"S, 36°30'22.0"E (Latitude:-14.800278; Longitude:36.506111).

== Overview ==
The power station has a capacity of 20 megawatts, to be sold directly to the Electricidade de Moçambique (EDM), the state-owned electricity utility company, under a 25 year power purchase agreement. The EPC contract includes the construction of a transmission line measuring 400 metres (1,312 ft), connecting this power station and its storage facility to an existing 33/110 kV substation, where the generated energy will enter the Mozambican national electricity grid. It is anticipated that the solar farm will enable the country forego the emissions of 630,000 tonnes of carbon dioxide (CO_{2}) over the next 25 years, effective the date of commercial commissioning.

== Developers ==
The power station was developed by a special purpose vehicle company, which we will describe as Cuamba Solar Company (CSC). CSC owns the power station. For the first five years of the life of the power station, TSK Group of Spain, the EPC contractor will operate and maintain the power station, before handing over to the owners. The table below illustrates the shareholding in the special purpose vehicle entity.

Shareholding in Cuamba Solar Company
Rank	Shareholder	Domicile	Description	Notes
1	Globeleq	United Kingdom	Independent Power Producer	
2	Source Capital	Mauritius	Investment Fund	

== Construction cost, funding and time table ==
The cost of construction is reported as US$36 million. Loan support was provided by Emerging Africa Infrastructure Fund (EAIF) ($19 million) and Viability Gap Funding (VGF) ($7 million). EAIF and VGF are both subsidiaries of the Private Infrastructure Development Group (PIDG). The power station was commercially commissioned in September 2023.

== See also ==
- List of power stations in Mozambique
- Dondo Solar Power Station
