= Petroline =

Petroline may refer to:

- East-West Crude Oil Pipeline
- Mozambique–South Africa Oil Pipeline
