= Mphanda Nkuwa Dam =

Proposed Zambezi construction

- Location within Mozambique
- Country: Mozambique
- Coordinates: 15°59′59″S 33°26′05″E
- Purpose: Power
- Status: Proposed
- Construction began: 2029 (expected)
- Opening date: 2034 (expected)
- Construction cost: US$6-7 billion

Dam and spillways
- Type of dam: Concrete gravity
- Impounds: Zambezi River
- Height: 103 m (338 ft)

Reservoir
- Surface area: 97 km^{2} (37 mi^{2})
- Maximum length: 60 km (37 mi)

Power Station
- Turbines: 4 x 375 MW
- Installed capacity: 1,500 MW
- Annual generation: 8,600 GWh

Mphanda Nkuwa Dam is a proposed hydroelectric dam on the Zambezi River in Mozambique. It would be located about 60 kilometres (37 mi) downstream of the existing Cahora Bassa Dam near the city of Tete. Its power station would have a capacity of 1,500 megawatts.

The dam would be 103 metres (338 ft) high and flood approximately 97 square kilometres (24,000 acres) of the Zambezi valley. The estimated cost of the project is US$4.2 billion. Once the dam is completed, it is expected that most of the generated power will be sold to South Africa, because of the lack of transmission infrastructure in Mozambique.

The proposed dam is highly controversial because it would force the relocation of 1,400 families, and affect the livelihoods of a further 200,000 people downriver. Because the dam would be operated on a peaking basis, large daily fluctuations in river flow would ruin existing irrigation systems and affect aquaculture in the river's extensive delta. The United Nations described in 1984 the Cahora Bassa existing dam as the "least environmentally acceptable major dam project in Africa."

In 2015, the Mozambique government announced it would start construction of the dam. The construction was contracted to Camargo Corrêa of Brazil, Insitec of Mozambique, and Electricidade de Moçambique. In 2020, Mozambique President Filipe Nyusi hoped that construction of the dam would start before 2024.

In 2022, the International Finance Corporation (IFC), a subsidiary of the World Bank Group, signed agreements with the Mozambican government, indicating willingness to participate in the development of this renewable energy project.

== Developments ==
In October 2022, the Mozambican government short-listed seven companies and consortia, who will be allowed to visit the site and then formulate detailed designs and plans to develop the dam and power station. The table below outlines the entities vying for the engineering, procurement and construction (EPC) contract for his project.

Mphanda Nkuwa Hydroelectric Power Station EPC contenders
Rank	Developer	Domicile	Notes
1	Électricité de France (EDF)	France	
2	Longyuan Power Overseas Investment and PowerChina Resources	China	
3	Scatec	Norway	
4	Sumitomo Corporation and Kansai Electric Power	Japan	
5	WeBuild Group	Italy	
6	ETC Holdings Mauritius	Mauritius	

In May 2023, the Mozambican authorities selected the consortium comprising Électricité de France and TotalEnergies as the preferred bidder. Other members of the winning consortium are the Japanese companies, Sumitomo Corporation and Kansai Electric Power. Negotiations with the preferred bidder are expected to start in earnest, leading to the signing of the requisite concession agreements.

The consortium comprising ETC Holdings of Mauritius, ZESCO of Zambia, CECOT, a subsidiary of Mota-Engil Group of Portugal, and PetroSA, a subsidiary of Central Energy Fund of South Africa, was selected as the reserve bidder.

As part of the development, a 550 kV high-voltage direct current transmission system, measuring 1,300 kilometres (808 mi) will be built between the town of Cataxa and the country's capital city of Maputo. Total contract price was expected to amount to US$4.5 billion.

In July 2025, Ajay Banga, the President of the World Bank, who visited the country announced that the multilateral finance body would back the project by providing "concessional funding for (a) legal issues (b) environmental issues (c) transmission lines (d) partial risk guarantees and (e) political risk insurance". At that time the total development budget had not been published but was estimated between US$ 5 to 6 billion.

In August 2026, it was announced that the dam's completion would be delayed until 2034, meaning the dam's construction would not begin until 2029. Additionally, the estimated cost was changed to $6-7 billion USD.

== Developers ==
On 23 December 2023, the government of Mozambique signed binding agreements with the developers of this HPP. The winning consortium, comprising EDF Energies of France, TotalEnergies of France and Sumitomo Corporation of Japan owns 70 percent of the concession, while EDM, the Mozambican electric utility company and Hidroeléctrica da Cahora Bassa (HCB), the company that owns Cahora Bassa Dam, jointly own the remaining 30 percent. The dam and power station will consume an estimated US$5 billion to build. The first turbine is expected to come online in 2031.

== Funding ==
In June 2023, following a meeting in Maputo, the capital city of Mozambique, between the Mphanda Nkuwa Hydroelectric Project Implementation Office (GMNK), a delegation from the European Union (EU) and the European Investment Bank (EIB), the EU and EIB committed to finance the construction of the power station to the tune of €200 million and fund the construction of the electricity transmission network to the tune of €300 million, for a total commitment of €500 million.
