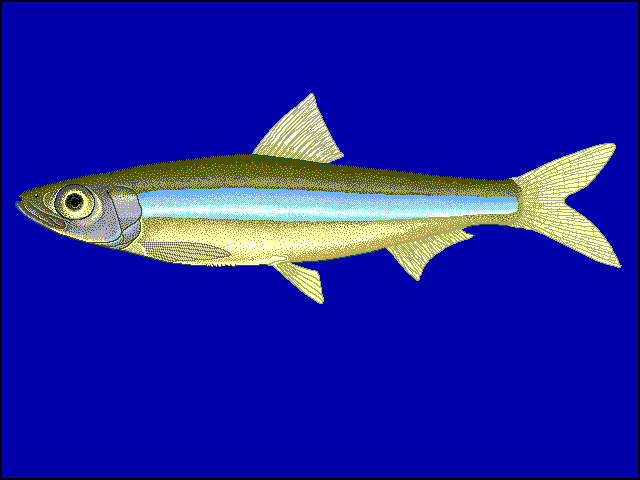

Conservation status
- Least Concern (IUCN 3.1)

Scientific classification
- Kingdom: Animalia
- Phylum: Chordata
- Class: Actinopterygii
- Order: Clupeiformes
- Family: Dorosomatidae
- Genus: Limnothrissa
- Species: L. miodon

Binomial name
- Limnothrissa miodon (Boulenger, 1906)

Synonyms
- Pellonula miodon Boulenger, 1906

= Lake Tanganyika sardine =

Species of fish

The Lake Tanganyika sardine (Limnothrissa miodon) is a species of freshwater ray-finned fish in the family Dorosomatidae which was endemic to Lake Tanganyika but which has now been introduced to other lakes in Africa as a food source. It is one of two species within the genus Limnothrissa, the other being the Lake Mweru endemic, L. strappersi. This species and the Lake Tanganyika sprat are known collectively as kapenta.

== Distribution ==
As its name suggests the Lake Tanganyika sardine was endemic to Lake Tanganyika extending into the lower reaches of the Malagarasi River. It was introduced to Lake Kivu in Rwanda in 1959 and the man-made Lake Kariba in the Zambezi valley between Zambia and Zimbabwe, and more recently into the Itezhi-Tezhi Dam in Zambia. It has colonised Cahora Bassa lake in Mozambique from Lake Kariba – the fish have survived transit through the hydro-electric turbines in the Kariba Dam and made their way downstream, colonising Cahora Bassa.

== Description ==
A typical clupeiform, this is a small silver fish with a brighter stripe down the lateral line, a broad snout with tapering sides. It has a relatively large swim bladder which allows it to travel large vertical distances in the water column. The maximum length is 17 centimetres (6.7 in), but most specimens are about 10 centimetres (3.9 in) long and they are thought to be sexually mature at 6.8 centimetres (2.7 in).

== Biology ==
Lake Tanganyika sardines undergo vertical migrations, spending the day in tight shoals in deep water, rising to the surface at dawn and dusk while spending the remainder of the night dispersed widely throughout the pelagic waters, although in Lake Kivu the fish move to the surface during the early morning and late afternoon. It is thought that these movements follow those of its food source, zooplankton but in Lake Kariba they do not. It seems that the fish and the plankton are responding to the same stimuli meaning that they occur in the same locations at similar times. One theory is that this may be a reaction to light intensity and be protection against predators, similar to that reported in marine clupeids.

The depth used by Lake Tanganyika sardines is determined by the depth of the thermocline and the amount of dissolved oxygen. Below the thermocline, the water is normally anoxic and from November to April the fish are found no deeper than 20 metres (66 ft). Adults migrate into deeper water as they grow larger, with the smaller, young fish preferring clear water of around 1.5 metres (4 ft 11 in) deep with a rocky or sandy bottom and also occur in areas with steep shores. The adults move into the shallows to breed, this is usually during the rainy season and peaks in May and June and again in December and January but has been recorded throughout the year. The fecundity of these fish increases as they grow; in samples from Lake Kariba a fish which was 46 millimetres (1.8 in) in length had 600 eggs while another measuring 11.4 centimetres (4.5 in) had 14,044 eggs. In Lake Tanganyika fish had higher fecundity and a fish sampled there of 140 millimetres (5.5 in) had 55,000 eggs. The main breeding season in Kariba is from about September to February, the population will generally increase steadily from February to August and then fall because of high mortality and decreased recruitment.

Lake Tanganyika sardines are omnivorous, feeding mainly on zooplankton and phytoplankton. In Lake Kariba studies over time have shown that they opportunistically feed on the most abundant prey at any given time and different samples have shown the main prey to be Bosmina longirostris, Mesocyclops spp and Ceriodaphnia dubia. Lake Tanganyika sardines may have caused a decline in the abundance of some larger zooplankton species, e.g. Diaptomus, Ceriodaphnia and Diaphanosoma, which were more abundant in Lake Kariba prior to 1971 but as no stomach contents were sampled then we cannot be certain what caused their decline. In Lake Tanganyika prey has been recorded as atyid shrimps, also copepods and prawns but larger fish have been known to prey on the larva of the Lake Tanganyika sprat. Other food items include insects, such as chironomids, ephemeroptera, trichoptera and hemiptera and in some Lake Kariba samples these formed 55% of the stomach contents sampled and it is indicated by these samples that these prey items are taken on the surface at night. In Lake Kivu cannibalism appears to be common and is suspected in the Lake Kariba population but these may also prey on other fish species, unidentified fish remains have been recorded in Kariba samples and a specimen of the Southern mouth-brooder Pseudocrenilabrus philander has been found in the stomach of 6.4 centimetres (2.5 in) specimen in Lake Kariba.

== Evolutionary history ==
Most clupeiforms are marine yet Lake Tanganyika was formed by rifting and has never had a connection with sea. The family that the Lake Tanganyika sardine and its relative the Lake Tanganyika sprat, are members of, the Dorosomatidae, are common in southern and western Africa, for example Microthrissa royauxi and Potamothrissa acuitirostris in the Congo Basin. Molecular phylogenetic reconstructions indicate that the ancestors of these freshwater dorosomatids colonised West Africa 25–50 million years ago, at the end of a major marine incursion in the region. Dorosomatids subsequently speciated in an evolutionary radiation in West Africa, spreading across the continent and colonising Lake Tanganyika during its early formation. This shows that while Lake Tanganyika has never been directly connected with the sea, the endemic freshwater clupeiforms of the lake are descended from fish who radiated out of an ancient marine incursion.

== Etymology of the scientific name ==
The generic name is derived from the Greek limno meaning lake, referring to this species' distribution in Lake Tanganyika; and thrissa, the Greek word for a kind of anchovy which is used here as a standard suffix for clupeids, the specific name miodon is a compound of mio- meaning less or small and odon meaning tooth, referring to smaller teeth compared to related species such as Pellonula vorax.

== Predators ==
In Lake Kariba the most important predator on the Lake Tanganyika sardine is Hydrocynus vittatus, and the population in Lake Kariba increased following the introduction of the sardines. The diet of H. vittatus changed and as much as 70% of the food eaten by H. vittatus consisted of sardines by 1971. H. vittatus predation appears to be most intense at dawn and dusk when they were seen feeding on sardines at the surface at these times.

Other fish predators of the sardines in Lake Kariba include Coptodon rendalli, Synodontis zambezensis and Schilbe intermedius. Some birds also feed on the sardines in Lake Kariba and possibly elsewhere, notably the white-winged black tern, Chlidonias leucoptera and the pied kingfisher Ceryle rudis.

== Fisheries ==
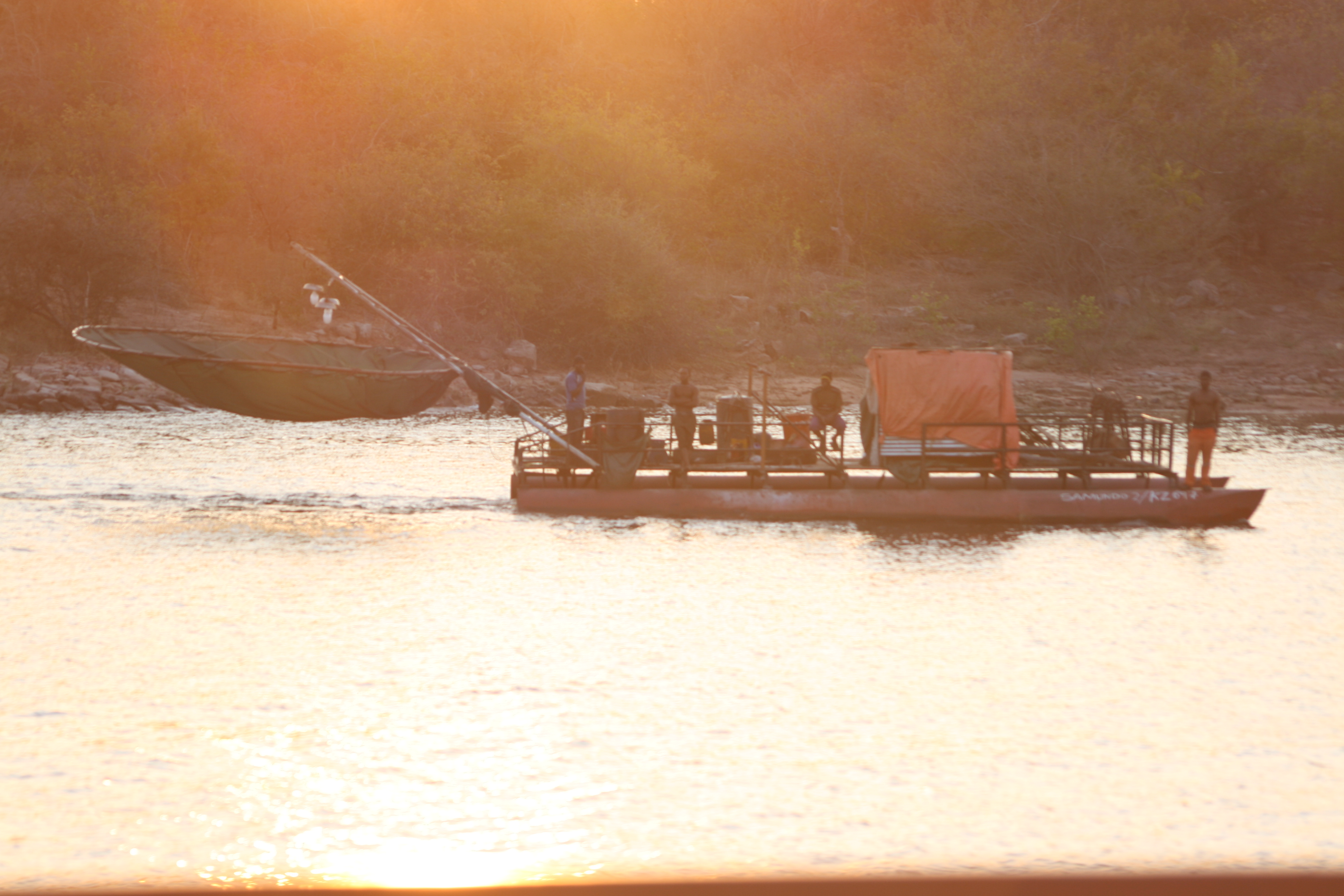
Kapenta rig

In Lake Kariba 360,000 Lake Tanganyika sardines were introduced by the Zambian government in 1967 and 1968 to be fished, here they enter the fishery at about 40 millimetres (1.6 in) in length when they are 3–4 months old. The bulk of those caught in the fishery are 40–50 millimetres (1.6–2.0 in) long and about 5 months old. There appears to be a correlation between biomass and fishing effort, as the biomass was 10% lower in 1985 than it was in 1974 when fishing began. The annual catch on Lake Kariba is now between 20,000 and 30,000 tonnes (22,000 and 33,000 short tons).

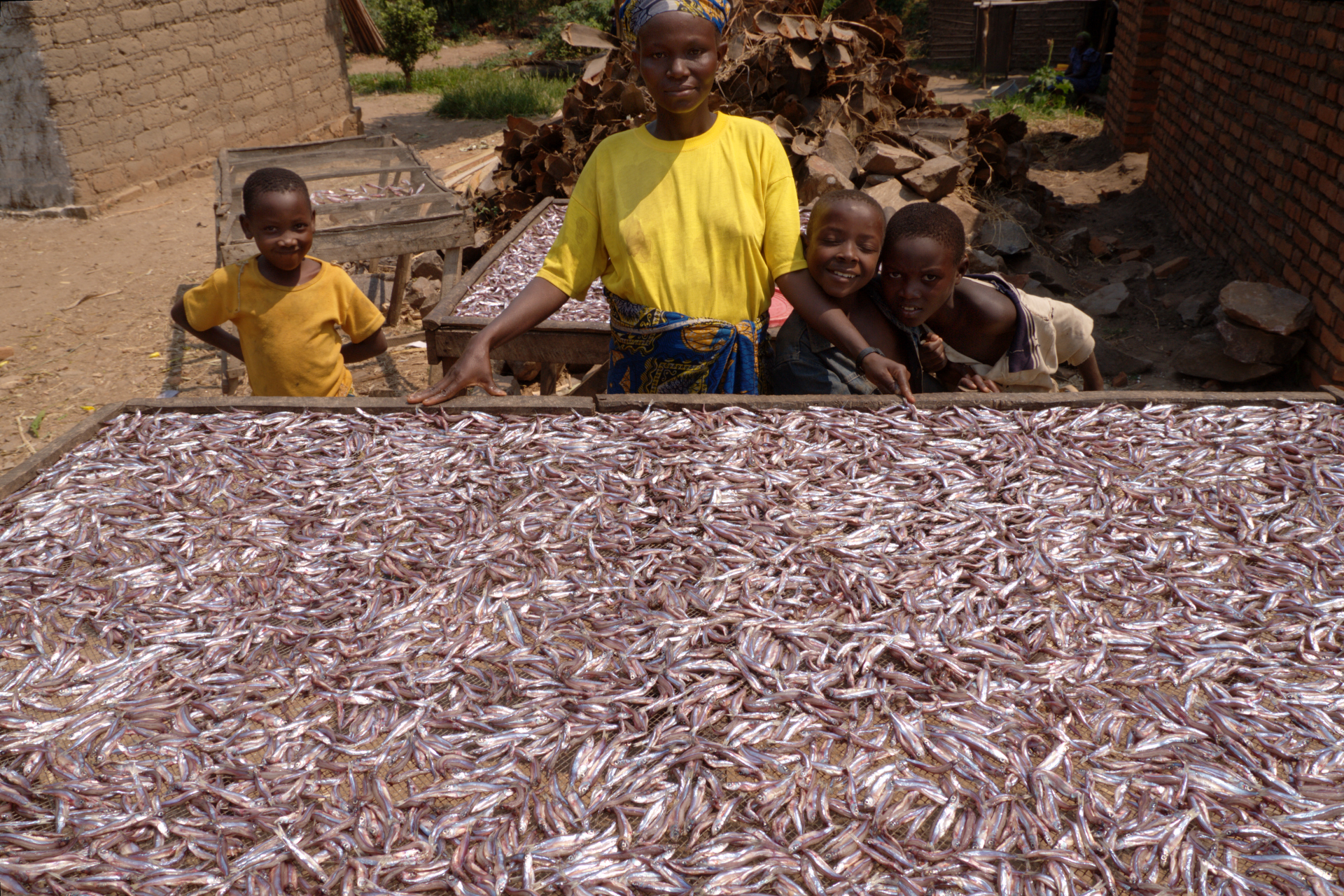
Kapenta fish drying in the sun

== See also ==
- Kapenta
