= Metoro Solar Power Station =

Solar farm in Mozambique

- Country: Mozambique
- Location: Metoro, Ancuabe District; Cabo Delgado Province
- Coordinates: 13°04′42″S 39°50′11″E
- Status: Operational
- Construction began: October 2020
- Commission date: April 2022
- Construction cost: US$56 million
- Owner: Metoro Solar Consortium
- Operator: Electricidade de Moçambique

Solar farm
- Type: Flat-panel PV
- Site area: 138 hectares (340 acres)

Power generation
- Units under const.: 121500
- Nameplate capacity: 41 MW (55,000 hp)
- Annual net output: 68 GWh

The Metoro Solar Power Station is a 41 megawatt solar power plant in Mozambique. The power station was developed by a consortium comprising Neoen, a French independent power producer (IPP) based in Paris, France and Electricidade de Moçambique (EDM), the Mozambican electricity utility company. Construction began in October 2020, with commercial commissioning expected in the fourth quarter of 2021.

== Location ==
The power station is located near the town of Metoro, in Ancuabe District in Cabo Delgado Province in northeastern Mozambique. Metoro is located about 20 kilometres (12 mi), by road, south of Ancuabe, the district headquarters. Metoro is located approximately 95 kilometres (59 mi) west of the city of Pemba, the provincial capital. The solar farm sits on 138 hectares (340 acres) of land.

== Overview ==
The power station has a maximum generation capacity of 41 megawatts. It comprises 121,500 solar panels. Its output is sold directly to the Electricidade de Moçambique (EDM), for integration into the national grid, under a 25-year power purchase agreement. A new high voltage power transmission line delivers the power to an EDM substation, where the power enters the national grid.

The power station provides 68 GWh of energy annually, enough to supply 75 percent of the electricity needs of the city of Pemba, as of 2020. The project will provided 380 jobs during construction and 25 permanent jobs after commercial commissioning.

The completed solar farm was commercially commissioned in April 2022, in the presence of Filipe Nyusi, the Mozambican president.

== Developers ==
The power station was developed by a joint venture company, referred to here as Metoro Solar Consortium (MSC). The table below illustrates the shareholding in MSC.

Shareholding in Metoro Solar Consortium
| Rank | Shareholder | Domicile | Percentage |
|---|---|---|---|
| 1 | Neoen | France | 75.0 |
| 2 | Electricidade de Moçambique | Mozambique | 25.0 |
| | Total | | 100.00 |

== Construction costs and funding ==
The engineering, procurement and construction contract was awarded to Efacec Power Solutions, an engineering and infrastructure developer based in Portugal, at a contract price of US$56 million (approx. €47.5 million). The table below illustrates the sources of funding for this renewable energy infrastructure development.

Sources of funding For Metoro Solar Power Station
| Rank | Source | Dollars (millions) | Percentage | Notes |
|---|---|---|---|---|
| 1 | Proparco | 40.0 | 71.4 | Loan |
| 2 | Government of Mozambique | 16.0 | 28.6 | Equity |
| | Total | 56.0 | 100.00 | |

== Other considerations ==
The solar farm will aid Mozambique in avoiding the emission of 49,000 tons of carbon dioxide every year. After 25 years of operation, it is expected that the ownership of the power station will revert to Electricidade de Moçambique.

== See also ==
- List of power stations in Mozambique
