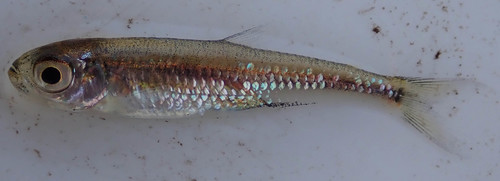
- Lake Tanganyika sardine (Limnothrissa miodon)

Scientific classification
- Kingdom: Animalia
- Phylum: Chordata
- Class: Actinopterygii
- Order: Clupeiformes
- Family: Dorosomatidae
- Genus: Limnothrissa; Regan, 1917

Type species
- Pellonula miodon Boulenger, 1906

= Limnothrissa =

Genus of fishes

Limnothrissa is a small genus of freshwater ray-finned fishes belonging to the family Dorosomatidae, which also includes the gizzard shads and sardinellas. The species in this genus are endemic to Africa. It was considered to be monospecific but L. strappersi, a Lake Mweru endemic, has been recognised as a valid species. The Lake Tanganyika sardine was endemic to Lake Tanganyika until it was introduced to Lake Kivu, Lake Kariba and the Cahora Bassa reservoir.

== Species ==
Limnothrissa contains the following valid species:

- Limnothrissa miodon (Boulenger, 1906) (Lake Tanganyika sardine)
- Limnothrissa strappersi (Poll, 1974) (Strapper's sprat)
