= Lagosta gas field =

Natural gas field offshore Cabo Delgado Province, Mozambique

Lagosta
- Country: Mozambique
- Region: Cabo Delgado Province
- Offshore/onshore: offshore
- Operator: TotalEnergies

Field history
- Discovery: 2012
- Start of production: 2012

Production
- Current production of gas: 1.9×10^{6} m^{3}/d 50×10^{6} cu ft/d 0.5×10^{9} m^{3}/a (18×10^{9} cu ft/a)
- Estimated gas in place: 143×10^{9} m^{3} 5×10^{12} cu ft

The Lagosta gas field is a natural gas field located offshore the Cabo Delgado Province of Mozambique in Offshore Area 1. Discovered in 2012, it was developed by Anadarko Petroleum, determining it to have initial total proven reserves of around 5 trillion ft^{3} (143 km^{3}). It began production of natural gas and condensates later that year, with a production rate of around 50 million ft^{3}/day (1.9×10^{5} m^{3}).

In 2017, the Windjammer, Barquentine and Lagosta fields were renamed Prosperidade.

In October 2019, Occidental Petroleum acquired Andarko Petroleum and sold the African portfolio, including Prosperidade, to French natural gas company, TotalEnergies. The project was paused in 2021 due to the Insurgency in Cabo Delgado and is scheduled to restart in 2029.

== See also ==
- Oil and natural gas in Mozambique
