= Barquentine gas field =

Natural gas field offshore Cabo Delgado Province, Mozambique

Barquentine
- Country: Mozambique
- Region: Cabo Delgado Province
- Offshore/onshore: offshore
- Operator: TotalEnergies

Field history
- Discovery: 2012
- Start of production: 2012

Production
- Current production of gas: 2.9×10^{6} m^{3}/d 100×10^{6} cu ft/d 1×10^{9} m^{3}/a (35×10^{9} cu ft/a)
- Estimated gas in place: 857×10^{9} m^{3} 30×10^{12} cu ft

The Barquentine gas field is a natural gas field located offshore the Cabo Delgado Province of Mozambique. Discovered in 2012, it was developed by Anadarko Petroleum, determining it to have initial total proven reserves of around 30 trillion ft^{3} (857 km^{3}). It began production of natural gas and condensates later that year, with a production rate of around 100 million ft^{3}/day (2.9×10^{5} m^{3}).

In 2017, the Windjammer, Barquentine and Lagosta fields were renamed Prosperidade. The fields are part of the Offshore Area 1 project within the Rovuma Basin, approximately 40km off the shores of northern Mozambique.

In October 2019, Occidental Petroleum acquired Andarko Petroleum and sold the African portfolio, including Prosperidade, to French natural gas company, TotalEnergies. The project was paused in 2021 due to Insurgency in Cabo Delgado and is scheduled to restart in 2029.

== See also ==
Oil and Natural Gas in Mozambique
