= Mocuba Solar Power Station =

Solar power station in Mozambique

- Country: Mozambique
- Location: Mocuba, Mocuba District, Zambezia Province
- Coordinates: 16°49′22″S 37°02′05″E
- Status: Operational
- Construction began: June 2018
- Commission date: August 2019
- Construction cost: US$76 million
- Owner: Mocuba Solar Energy Consortium
- Operator: Electricidade de Moçambique (EDM)

Solar farm
- Type: Flat-panel PV

Power generation
- Nameplate capacity: 40 MW
- Annual net output: 79 GWh

Mocuba Solar Power Station, is an operational 40 megawatt solar power plant in Mozambique. The public–private partnership project, sells the energy produced to the national electric utility, Electricidade de Moçambique (EDM), under a 25-year power purchase agreement.

== Location ==
The power station sits on 200 hectares (490 acres) of land with the solar panels occupying 170 hectares (420 acres). The development is located in the municipality of Mocuba, in Zambezia Province, in the central coastal region of Mozambique. This is approximately 150 kilometres (93 mi), north of the city of Quelimane, where the provincial headquarters are located. Mocuba is located about 1,975 kilometres (1,227 mi), by road, northeast of Maputo, the capital city of Mozambique. The geographical coordinates of Mocuba Solar Power Station are: 16°49'22.0"S, 37°02'05.0"E (Latitude:-16.822778; Longitude:37.034722).

== Overview ==
The power station was developed by a consortium, the Mocuba Solar Energy Consortium, comprising (a) Scatec Solar, a Norwegian independent solar power producer (b) the Mozambican electricity utility company Electricidade de Moçambique and (c) KLP Norfund Investments, a subsidiary of Norfund. The power station produces 40 megawatts of electricity, which EDM will purchase for 25 years from the date of commissioning, according to an agreement signed between the owners of the power station and the Government of Mozambique.

== Ownership ==
Mocuba Solar Power Station is owned by the entity that developed it, Mocuba Solar Energy Consortium. The table below illustrates the shareholding within the consortium:

Mocuba Solar Energy Consortium Stock Ownership
Rank	Name of Owner	Domicile	Percentage Ownership
1	Scatec Solar	Norway	52.5
2	Electricidade de Mozambique	Mozambique	25.0
3	KLP Norfund Investments	Norway	22.5
	Total		100.00

== Timeline ==
Construction began in June 2018 and was completed in July 2019. Commercial commissioning was effected in August 2019.

== Financing ==
The funds used to construct this power station, whose cost price is reported as US$76 million, were borrowed from (a) the World Bank Group and (b) the Emerging Africa Infrastructure Fund.

== Other considerations ==
During the construction phase, this project created 1,209 jobs, with 1,052 of them being local. The solar power plant is expected to save the country approximately 79,000 tonnes of carbon dioxide emissions annually.

== See also ==
- List of power stations in Mozambique
