= Nacala Solar Power Station =

Solar farm in Mozambique

Nacala Solar Power Station Nacala Solar Power Station (Mozambique)
- Country: Mozambique
- Location: Nacala International Airport, Nampula Province
- Coordinates: 14°28′57″S 40°43′13″E
- Status: Proposed
- Owner: WHN Solar Company

Solar farm
- Type: Flat-panel PV

Power generation
- Nameplate capacity: 100 MW (130,000 hp)

Nacala Solar Power Station, is a planned solar power plant in Mozambique. The 100 megawatt installation is at the feasibility study stage. If and when the solar farm is developed, it will be the largest solar power station in the country. The development plans to include an energy-storage facility with capacity of 50 megawatts. The lead developer is WHN Solar Company, a Mozambican independent power producer (IPP).

== Location ==
The power station would be located in the port-city of Nacala, on the premises of Nacala International Airport, in the Nampula Province of Mozambique.

Nacala Airport lies on the Atlantic coast, approximately 204 kilometres (127 mi), by road, northeast of Nampula, the provincial capital.

== Overview ==
The solar farm would be built in stages of 20–40 megawatts, up to a capacity of 100 megawatts. The developer/owner of the power station, WHN Solar Company, a Mozambican IPP, engaged HDR International Inc., an American company to carry out a feasibility study for the solar farm and an associated 50 megawatt storage facility.

In addition to HDR, other American companies are involved in the project, including (a) ERM, which will carry out the environmental and social assessment (b) Marathon Engineering, "which will provide engineering, geotechnical and energy support" and (c) Covington & Burling for international legal advice and representation.

Mozambican companies involved include Couto, Graça e Associados, a law firm providing legal representation, and Norconsult Mozambique, which will assist with the study of the national electricity grid of Mozambique.

== Funding ==
This renewable energy infrastructure development received US$1.2 million, as a grant from the United States Trade and Development Agency (USTDA). WHN also receives financial advice and funding assistance from Fieldstone Africa, in relation to this project. Fieldstone Africa is an independent investment bank and financial services provider in energy and infrastructure on the Continent. It is headquartered in Sandton, Johannesburg, South Africa.

== See also ==
- List of power stations in Mozambique
