= Mamba South Oil and Gas Field =

Natural gas field offshore Cabo Delgado Province, Mozambique

Mamba South gas field (oil field)
- Country: Mozambique
- Location: Cabo Delgado Province
- Block: Area 4
- Offshore/onshore: Offshore
- Partners: Eni; Galp Energia; Kogas

Field history
- Discovery: 2011
- Start of production: 2016

Production
- Estimated gas in place: 15,000×10^{9} cu ft (420×10^{9} m^{3})
- Producing formations: Eocene offshore sands

The Mamba South Oil and Gas Field is a supergiant Petroleum reservoir located offshore the Cabo Delgado Province, in the Rovuma Basin of Mozambique, in Offshore Area 4.

Discovered in October 2011 by Italian company Eni, who at the time held a 70% stake in Area 4 (Other partners holding 10% each - Galp Energia, KOGAS, and ENH), gave an original estimate of the natural gas reserve at "at least 15tcf" however this was revised the following week "to a potential of up to 22.5 Tcf of gas".

It is one of the largest petroleum fields in the world, with an estimated natural gas reserve of 424.7 million m^{3} (15 trillion ft^{3}) out of an estimated natural gas resource of 624.5 billion m³ (22.1 trillion ft^{3}). Along with an estimated 51.0 million bbl in liquid resource.
