= Dondo Solar Power Station =

Solar power station in Mozambique

- Country: Mozambique
- Location: Dondo, Dondo District, Sofala Province
- Coordinates: 19°35′13″S 34°42′23″E
- Status: Proposed
- Commission date: December 2022 Expected

Solar farm
- Type: Flat-panel PV

Power generation
- Nameplate capacity: 40 MW (54,000 hp)

The Dondo Solar Power Station is a planned 40 MW (54,000 hp) solar power plant in Mozambique. The power station is part of a 160 megawatts energy package of four renewable energy power stations under development in the country. They comprise three solar power stations in the districts of Dondo, Lichinga and Chiuta, together with a wind farm in Inhambane Province. Each power station will have maximum generation capacity of 40 MW.

== Location ==
The power station is located in Dondo District, near the town of Dondo, the district headquarters. Dondo is located approximately 35 kilometres (22 mi) by road north-west of the city of Beira, the provincial capital and nearest large city. Dondo is approximately 1,107 kilometres (688 mi), by road, north of Maputo, the capital city of Mozambique.

== Overview ==
The power station has a 40 megawatt capacity. Its output is to be sold directly to the Mozambican public electricity utility company Electricidade de Moçambique (EDM), for integration into the national grid. The development of this power station, the first of three solar power stations and one wind farm, is part of a program known as Proler (Portuguese: "Promoçao de Leilões de Energias Renovaveis"), (English: "Renewable Energy Auction Promotion Programme"), launched in October 2020 by the President of Mozambique. The power station will be developed by an independent power producer (IPP), and is supported by the French Development Agency (AFD) and the European Union.

== Developers ==
In November 2020, the Mozambican Energy Regulatory Authority (ARENE), announced the 12 proposals that were selected from 135 submissions from local and foreign firms to build, finance, own and operate this power station. The winning 12 firms then progressed to the final two stages of this contest.

In April 2021, five companies and consortia were selected as the top five contenders for the award to construct the power station. The five entities then progressed to the final two stages of the contest, which include technical submissions and financing details. The five finalists are listed in the table below:

The Five Finalists Vying For Construction of Dondo Solar Farm
Rank	IPP	Domicile	Notes
1	Électricité de France Renewables	France	
2	Akuo Energy and Globeleq Africa	France & United Kingdom	
3	Enel Green Power	Italy	
4	Scatec Solar	Norway	
5	Total Eren	France	

In April 2022, the Mozambican Energy Regulatory Authority (ARENE), selected Total Eren, the subsidiary of TotalEnergies, to own, design, develop, fund, build and operate and maintain Dondo Solar Power Station. The energy generated at this solar farm will be purchased by EDM, the state-owned electricity parastatal company. The solar plant is expected to avoid the emission of 8,333 tons of carbon dioxide annually. Its output is planned to supply approximately 100,000 Mozambican customers.

== See also ==
- List of power stations in Mozambique
