= Lake Tanganyika sprat =

Conservation status
- Least Concern (IUCN 3.1)

Scientific classification
- Kingdom: Animalia
- Phylum: Chordata
- Class: Actinopterygii
- Order: Clupeiformes
- Family: Dorosomatidae
- Genus: Stolothrissa; Regan, 1917
- Species: S. tanganicae

Binomial name
- Stolothrissa tanganicae Regan, 1917

Species of fish

The Lake Tanganyika sprat (Stolothrissa tanganicae) is a species of fish in the family Dorosomatidae. It is monotypic within the genus Stolothrissa. It is found in Burundi, the Democratic Republic of the Congo, Tanzania, and Zambia. Its natural habitat is freshwater lakes. It and the Lake Tanganyika sardine are known collectively as kapenta.
