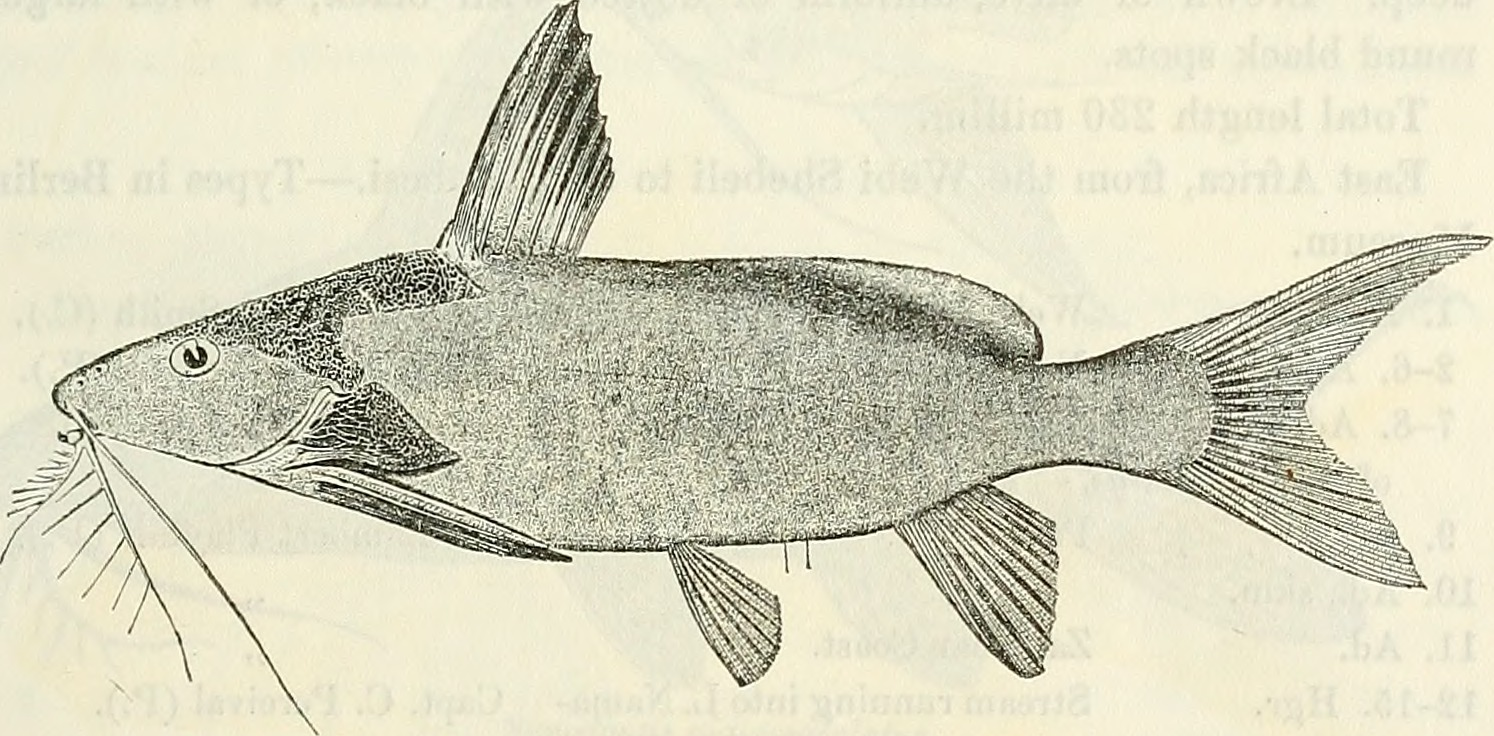

Conservation status
- Least Concern (IUCN 3.1)

Scientific classification
- Kingdom: Animalia
- Phylum: Chordata
- Class: Actinopterygii
- Order: Siluriformes
- Family: Mochokidae
- Genus: Synodontis
- Species: S. zambezensis

Binomial name
- Synodontis zambezensis Peters, 1852

= Synodontis zambezensis =

Species of fish

Synodontis zambezensis, known as the brown squeaker, the korokoro, or the plain squeaker, is a species of upside-down catfish that is native to the middle and lower Zambezi River system of Eswatini, Mozambique, South Africa, Tanzania, Zambia and Zimbabwe. It was first described by German naturalist and explorer Wilhelm Peters in 1852, from specimens collected in the Zambezi River in Mozambique. The species name zambezensis is derived from the Zambezi River, where this species is found.

== Description ==
Like all members of the genus Synodontis, S. zambezensis has a strong, bony head capsule that extends back as far as the first spine of the dorsal fin. The head contains a distinct narrow, bony, external protrusion called a humeral process. The shape and size of the humeral process helps to identify the species. In S. zambezensis, the humeral process is long, without a distinct keel, and ends in a sharp point.

The fish has three pairs of barbels. The maxillary barbels are on located on the upper jaw, and two pairs of mandibular barbels are on the lower jaw. The maxillary barbel is long and straight without any branches, with a narrow membrane at the base. It extends 1 to 1 1/3 times the length of the head. The outer pair of mandibular barbels is about twice the length of the inner pair, and both pairs have long, slender branches.

The front edges of the dorsal fins and the pectoral fins of Syntontis species are hardened into stiff spines. In S. zambezensis, the spine of the dorsal fin is slightly curved, short, about 1/2 as long as the head, smooth in the front and serrated on the back. The remaining portion of the dorsal fin is made up of seven branching rays. The spine of the pectoral fin about 2/3 to 1 times as long as the head, and serrated on both sides. The adipose fin is 3 to 4 1/2 times as long as it is deep. The anal fin contains four to five unbranched and seven to eight branched rays. The tail, or caudal fin, is deeply forked, with the upper lobe being longer.

All members of Syndontis have a structure called a premaxillary toothpad, which is located on the very front of the upper jaw of the mouth. This structure contains several rows of short, chisel-shaped teeth. In S. zambezensis, the toothpad forms a short and broad band. On the lower jaw, or mandible, the teeth of Syndontis are attached to flexible, stalk-like structures and described as "s-shaped" or "hooked". The number of teeth on the mandible is used to differentiate between species; in S. zambezensis, there are 20 to 35 teeth on the mandible.

The body color is brown or olive-colored, and may have small or larger round black spots. The spines are said to be poisonous.

The maximum standard length of the species is 43 centimetres (17 in). The maximum published weight is 820 grams (29 oz). Generally, females in the genus Synodontis tend to be slightly larger than males of the same age.

== Habitat and behavior ==
In the wild, the species has been found in the middle and lower Zambezi River south to the Phongolo River system in South Africa. It is possibly extinct in Swaziland. It is found in pools and slow-flowing reaches of rivers. It shelters, frequently upside-down, in holes, crevices, or on the underside of logs. The reproductive habits of most of the species of Synodontis are not known, beyond some instances of obtaining egg counts from gravid females. Spawning likely occurs during the flooding season between July and October, and pairs swim in unison during spawning. The fish feeds on detritus and plant matter such as seeds, as well as small invertebrates like insects and snails. The growth rate is rapid in the first year, then slows down as the fish age.
