= Mamba North gas field =

Natural gas field offshore Cabo Delgado Province, Mozambique

Mamba North
- Country: Mozambique
- Region: Cabo Delgado Province
- Offshore/onshore: offshore
- Operator: Eni

Field history
- Discovery: 2012
- Start of production: 2012

Production
- Current production of gas: 4×10^{6} m^{3}/d 140×10^{6} cu ft/d 1.5×10^{9} m^{3}/a (53×10^{9} cu ft/a)
- Estimated gas in place: 429×10^{9} m^{3} 15×10^{12} cu ft

The Mamba North gas field is a natural gas field located offshore the Cabo Delgado Province of Mozambique. Discovered in 2012, it was developed by Eni, determining it to have initial total proven reserves of around 15 trillion ft^{3} (429 km^{3}). It began production of natural gas and condensates later that year, with a production rate of around 140 million ft^{3}/day (4×10^{5} m^{3}).
