= Rainpower =

Rainpower ASA
- Company type: Public limited company (ASA)
- Industry: Engineering
- Predecessor: Kvaerner Brug AS; Sørumsand Verksted; GE Hydro
- Founded: 2007
- Headquarters: Kjeller (Akershus), Norway
- Products: Equipment for hydropower electricity generation
- Services: Engineering and technology development services
- Website: www.rainpower.no

Rainpower AS is a Norwegian company which develops, designs, manufactures and sells equipment for hydropower electricity generation. The company provides Pelton, Francis, and Kaplan turbines, as well as pump turbines, small hydropower plants, turbine governor, oil pressure systems, valve controllers, exciters, valves, gates, pipes, and other products and services related to the hydropower equipment industry.

== History ==
The company dates back to 1853 when Kvaerner Brug AS was established by Mr. Oluf A. Onsum. Later, forces were joined with Sørumsand Verksted. Kværner expanded rapidly, having acquired the hydraulic businesses of several other companies, such as NOHAB, KMW, Tampella, among others.

In 1999, General Electric Company acquired Kvaerner's hydropower business for $70.5m, and merged it with its own hydro division under the name GE Hydro. In 2005, GE Hydro, with the goal of divesting from the hydropower industry, sold its Sørumsand workshop to NLI AS; two years later, this same company bought the complete Norwegian hydro business from GE, and established the new company Rainpower ASA. The remaining business of GE Hydro was later sold to Andritz. As of 2012, Rainpower ASA is 100% owned by Børre Nordheim-Larsen through his two companies NLI Utvikling III AS (62%) and NLI AS (39%).

== Operations ==
Rainpower is headquartered at Kjeller, near Oslo. Rainpower provides equipment for generating electricity based on hydropower. Its turbines consist of Francis turbines, reversible pump turbines, Pelton turbines, and Kaplan turbines.
