= Mozambique–South Africa Oil Pipeline =

Location
- Country: Mozambique, South Africa
- Direction: north–south
- Start: Matola (Mozambique)
- Passes through: Nelspruit, Mpumalanga (South Africa)
- To: Kendal, Mpumalanga (South Africa)

General information
- Type: petrol
- Partners: Petróleos de Moçambique, Gigajoule International (Pty) Ltd, Companhia de Desenvolvimento de Petroleo de Mocambique, WOESA Consortium (Pty) Ltd.
- Operator: Petroline
- Commissioned: 2011

Technical information
- Length: 500 km (310 mi)
- Maximum discharge: 6 million cubic meters per year

The Mozambique–South Africa Oil Pipeline is a proposed multiproduct petrol and diesel fuel pipeline from Maputo to Gauteng, South Africa.

== Route ==
The 500 kilometres (310 mi) long pipeline will run from an existing coastal fuel-storage facility at Matola harbour in Mozambique to Nelspruit, Mpumalanga in South Africa. From there the pipeline will then continue to Kendal in Mpumalanga, where it could join the current Transnet Pipelines petroleum pipeline network. The project also foresees potential transport to neighboring countries, such as Botswana.

== Technical description ==
The initial capacity of the pipeline will be 6 million cubic meters of oil per year. It is possible that the maximum capacity would be higher because of the high demand. The project foresees the refurbishment and construction of tankage and improved loading capabilities in Matola, and new tankage in Nelspruit, Mpumalanga.

The technical design of the pipeline is led by VGI Consulting Engineers. The environmental impact assessment is coordinated by Nature & Business Alliance Africa. The pipeline is expected to cost US$620 million. The construction will start in 2009 and the pipeline is expected to be operational by 2011.

== Project company ==
The project is to be implemented by Petroline, a joint venture between Mozambican and South African companies. The biggest shareholder is Petróleos de Moçambique (Petromoc) with the stake of 40%. Other shareholders are Gigajoule International (Pty) Ltd, Companhia de Desenvolvimento de Petroleo de Mocambique, and WOESA Consortium (Pty) Ltd. Petrofac has an option to acquire 25%+1 share interest in the project.
