= Cahora Bassa =

Reservoir in Mozambique

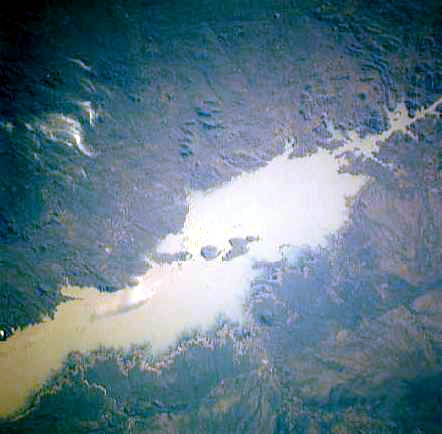
- A partial view of Cahora Bassa from space.

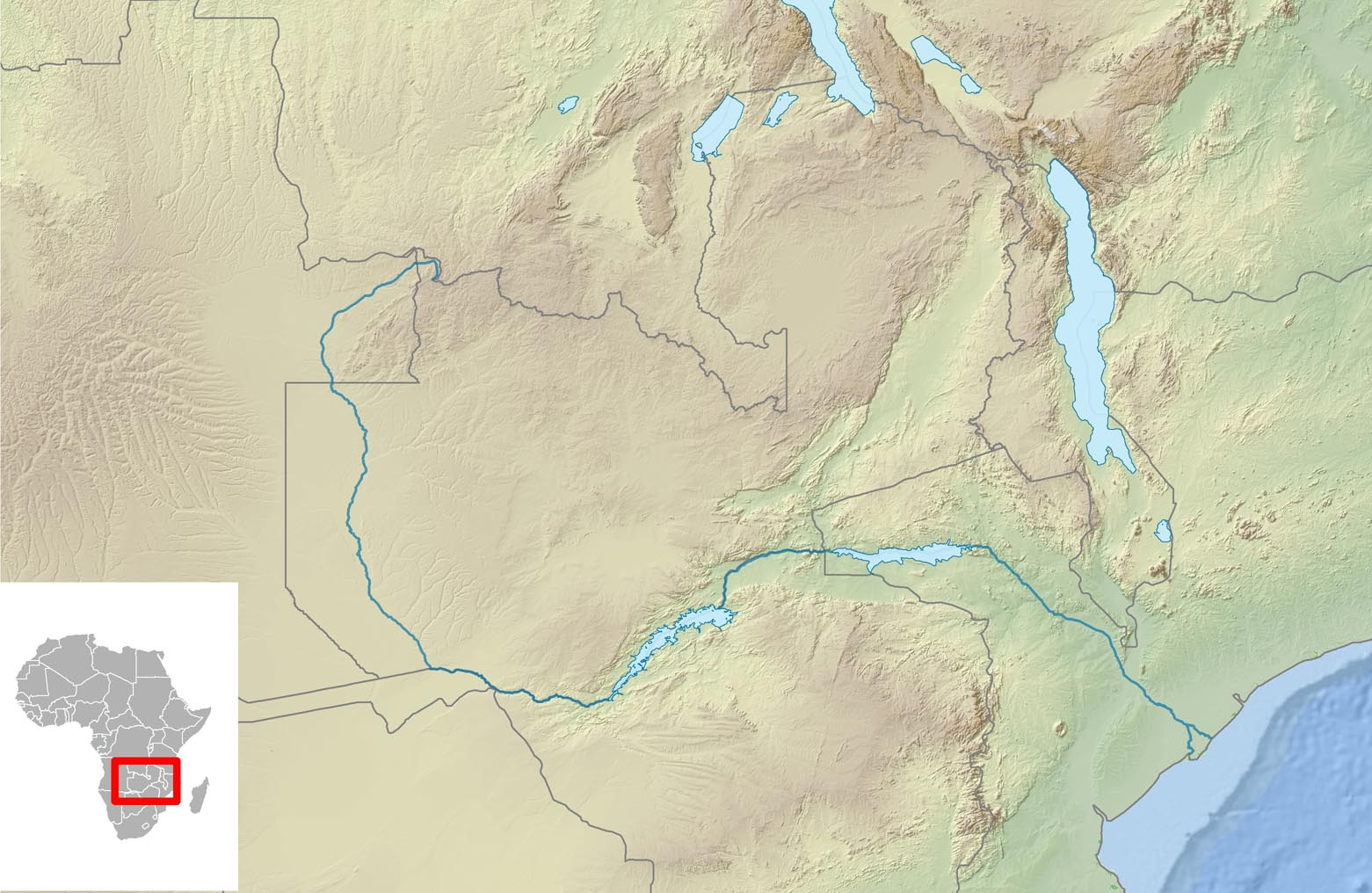
- Location in Mozambique Location on the Zambezi
- Location: Mozambique
- Coordinates: 15°40′S 31°50′E
- Lake type: Reservoir
- Primary inflows: Zambezi River
- Primary outflows: Zambezi River
- Catchment area: 56,927 km^{2} (21,980 sq mi)
- Basin countries: Mozambique
- Max. length: 292 km (181 mi)
- Max. width: 38 km (24 mi)
- Surface area: 2,739 km^{2} (1,058 sq mi)
- Average depth: 20.9 m (69 ft)
- Max. depth: 157 m (515 ft)
- Water volume: 55.8 km^{3} (45,200,000 acre⋅ft)
- Surface elevation: 314 m (1,030 ft)

The Cahora Bassa lake—in the Portuguese colonial era (until 1974) known as Cabora Bassa, from Nyungwe Kahoura-Bassa, meaning "finish the job"—is Africa's fourth-largest artificial lake, situated in the Tete Province in Mozambique. In Africa, only Lake Volta in Ghana, Lake Kariba on the Zambezi upstream of Cahora Bassa, and Egypt's Lake Nasser are bigger in terms of surface water.

== History ==
=== Portuguese period ===
The Cahora Bassa System started in the late 1960s as a project of the Portuguese in the Overseas Province of Mozambique. Southern African governments were also involved in an agreement stating that Portugal would build and operate a hydroelectric generating station at Cabora Bassa (as it was then called in Portuguese) together with the high-voltage direct current (HVDC) transmission system required to bring electricity to the border of South Africa. South Africa, on the other hand, undertook to build and operate the Apollo converter station and part of the transmission system required to bring the electricity from the South African-Mozambican border to the Apollo converter station near Pretoria. South Africa was then obliged to buy electricity that Portugal was obliged to supply.

During the struggle for independence, construction materials for the dam were repeatedly attacked in a strategic move by Frelimo guerrillas, as its completion would cause the lake to widen so much it would take very long to cross to the other side with their canoes. The dam began to fill in December 1974, after the Carnation Revolution in mainland Portugal and the independence agreement being signed. Mozambique officially became independent from Portugal on 25 June 1975.

Until November 2007, the dam was operated by Hidroeléctrica de Cahora Bassa (HCB) and jointly owned by Mozambique, with an 18% equity stake, and Portugal, which held the remaining 82% equity. On 27 November 2007, Mozambique assumed control of the dam from Portugal, when Portugal sold to Mozambique most of its 82 percent stake. Finance Minister Fernando Teixeira dos Santos said Portugal would collect US$950 million (€750 million) from the sale of its part of southern Africa's largest hydropower project. Portugal kept a 15 percent stake, though it planned to sell off another 10 percent at a later stage to an investor that would be proposed by the Mozambican government. Portugal's Prime Minister, José Sócrates, signed the agreement with the Mozambican government, during an official visit to Maputo. The agreement ended decades of dispute between Portugal and its former colony over the company, called Hidroeléctrica de Cahora Bassa. The central disagreement was over the handling of the company's estimated US$2.2 billion (€1.7 billion) debts to Portugal. Mozambican authorities argued they had not guaranteed the debt and therefore should not be liable for the payments.

=== Independent Mozambique ===
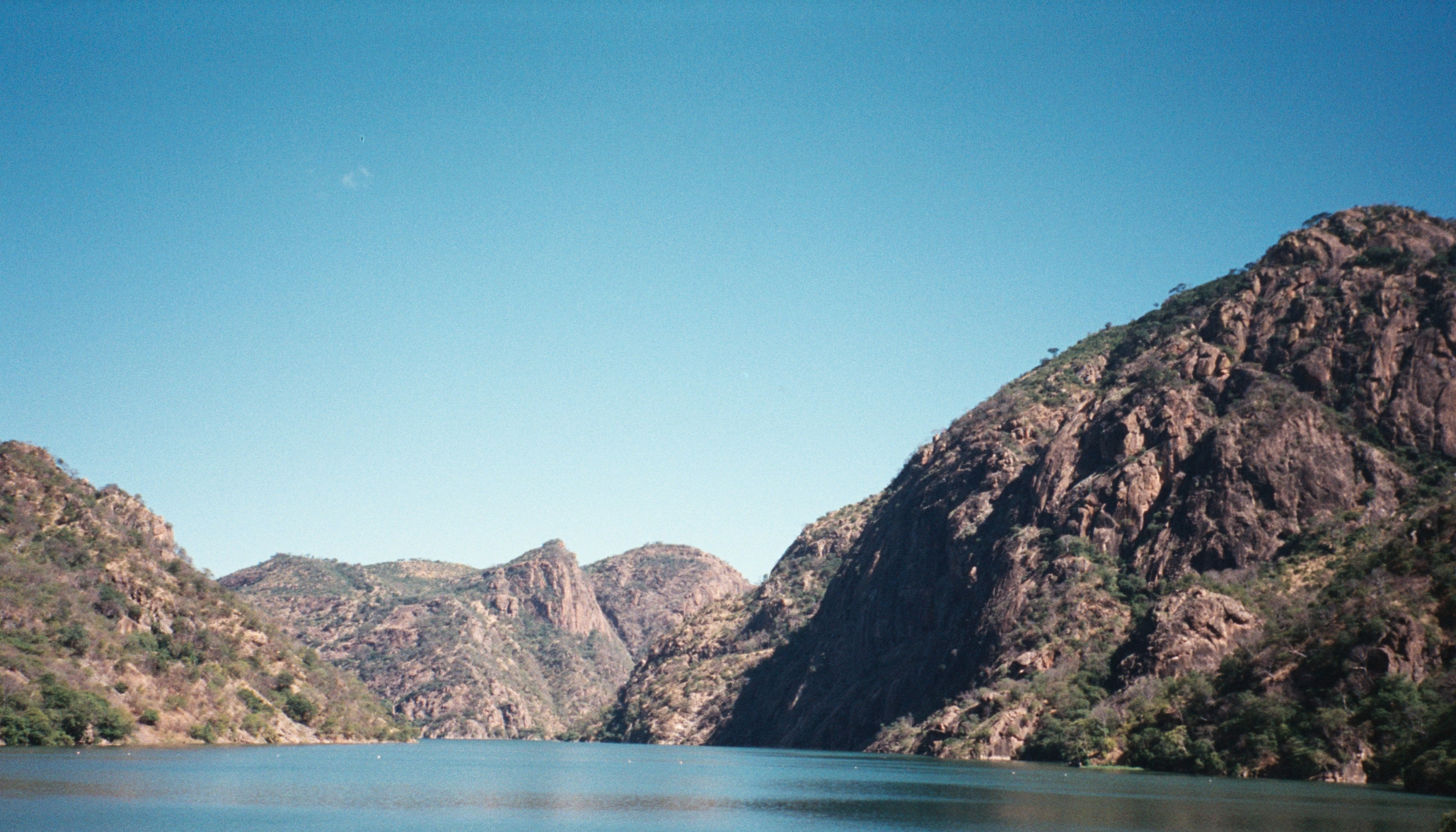
A view of the Cahora Bassa dam

Mozambique became independent from Portugal on 25 June 1975. Since closure, the Zambezi, which is the fourth largest floodplain river in Africa, has received a far more regulated flow rate, but disastrous natural floods still occur. The 1978 flood caused 45 deaths, 100,000 people to be displaced and $62 million worth of damage.

According to engineering consultants, "This was the first flood since completion of Cahora Bassa, and destroyed the widely held belief that the dam would finally bring flooding under full control". For further details of ecological problems caused by the dam, see the article on the Zambezi River.

During the Mozambican Civil War (1977–1992) the transmission lines were sabotaged to the extent that 1,895 towers needed to be replaced and 2,311 refurbished over a distance of 893 km on the Mozambican side of the line.

In the 1990s, after the end of the civil war, Hidroeléctrica de Cahora Bassa (HCB) appointed South Africa's Trans-Africa Projects (TAP) to perform the construction management, quality assurance and design support service for the rehabilitation of the project. TAP assisted HCB in awarding the construction contract to a joint venture company comprising Consorzio Italia 2000 and Enel, and a scheduled period of 24 months was set for the project. The lines in South Africa were damaged to a minor extent and only normal maintenance was required by Eskom to get these lines back in operation.

Work on the project started in August 1995. The line route in Mozambique passes through dense bush and difficult terrain from Songo to the South African border near Pafuri, with both servitudes infested with landmines from the Mozambican Civil War (1977–1992) that needed to be cleared before construction work could commence. Heavy, unseasonable rainfalls later affected the programme to such an extent that the first line could only be completed in August 1997 and the second in November that same year. During the refurbishment period, TAP developed and implemented various designs and construction methods to improve the overall programme schedules and project costs. In spite of the extreme conditions within which they had to refurbish and reconstruct these lines, the work was completed within schedule and with a limited budget. The lines have, since completion, been subject to numerous tests and energised to its full potential. About 1,100 people were employed during the peak periods of construction.

The rainfalls and severe flooding during February 2000 in the Limpopo River valley again caused considerable damage to both lines to the extent that about 10 towers collapsed and need to be reconstructed within the shortest possible timeframe to restore the power supply to South Africa. TAP was again entrusted by HCB with the engineering, procurement and construction management services. TAP managed to temporarily restore power supply through the one line while a more permanent solution could be carried out on the other line. The reconstructed line is used to carry the full line capacity. TAP had to implement unconventional construction techniques to recover temporary supply. The suspension towers next to the river crossing posed a significant challenge for a temporary power solution to obtain the required clearances of the 711 metre level terrain span.

On April 27, 2009 four foreign nationals were arrested for putting a "highly corrosive" substance into the lake in an alleged attempt to sabotage the power station. The arrested claimed to be a team from Orgonise Africa, placing orgonite pieces in the lake to improve the quality of etheric energy (life force) of the dam.

Since 2005, the area is considered a Lion Conservation Unit.

== Related economic activities ==
Most of the electricity generated by Cahora Bassa, which is located on the Zambezi River in western Mozambique, is sold to nearby South Africa. In 2006, Cahora Bassa transmitted about 1,920 megawatts of power, but the infrastructure is capable of higher production levels and the company had plans to almost double its output by 2008. In 1994 the total installed capacity in Mozambique was 2,400 MW of which 91% was hydroelectric.

A considerable kapenta fishery has developed in the reservoir. The kapenta is assumed to originate from Lake Kariba where it was introduced from Lake Tanganyika. Annual catch of kapenta in the Cahora Bassa dam in 2003 exceeded 10,000 tonnes.

=== Sharks ===
It is widely believed that there is a breeding colony of Zambezi sharks "trapped" inside the reservoir. As the bull shark is known to travel more than 100 km upstream, this phenomenon does not conflict with existing scientific and biological fact. Usually an ocean-dwelling species, bull sharks are perfectly capable of living in fresh water for their entire lifespan. Local tribes have indeed reported sightings (and attacks) by this isolated community of shark, although these have yet to be substantiated with hard evidence.

== See also ==
- 2007 Mozambican flood
- Cahora Bassa Dam
- Cahora Bassa (HVDC) for details of the power scheme based on the dam.
