= Cahora Bassa Dam =

Dam in Mozambique

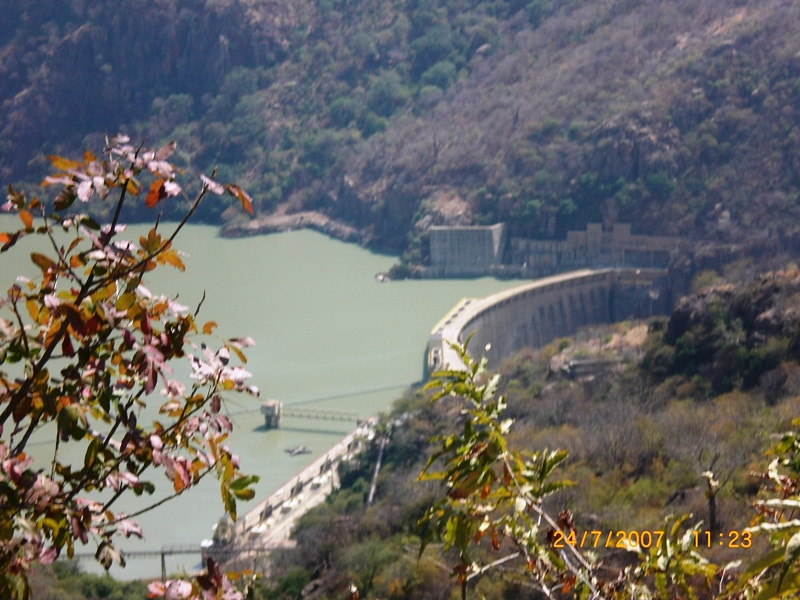
- The dam in 2007

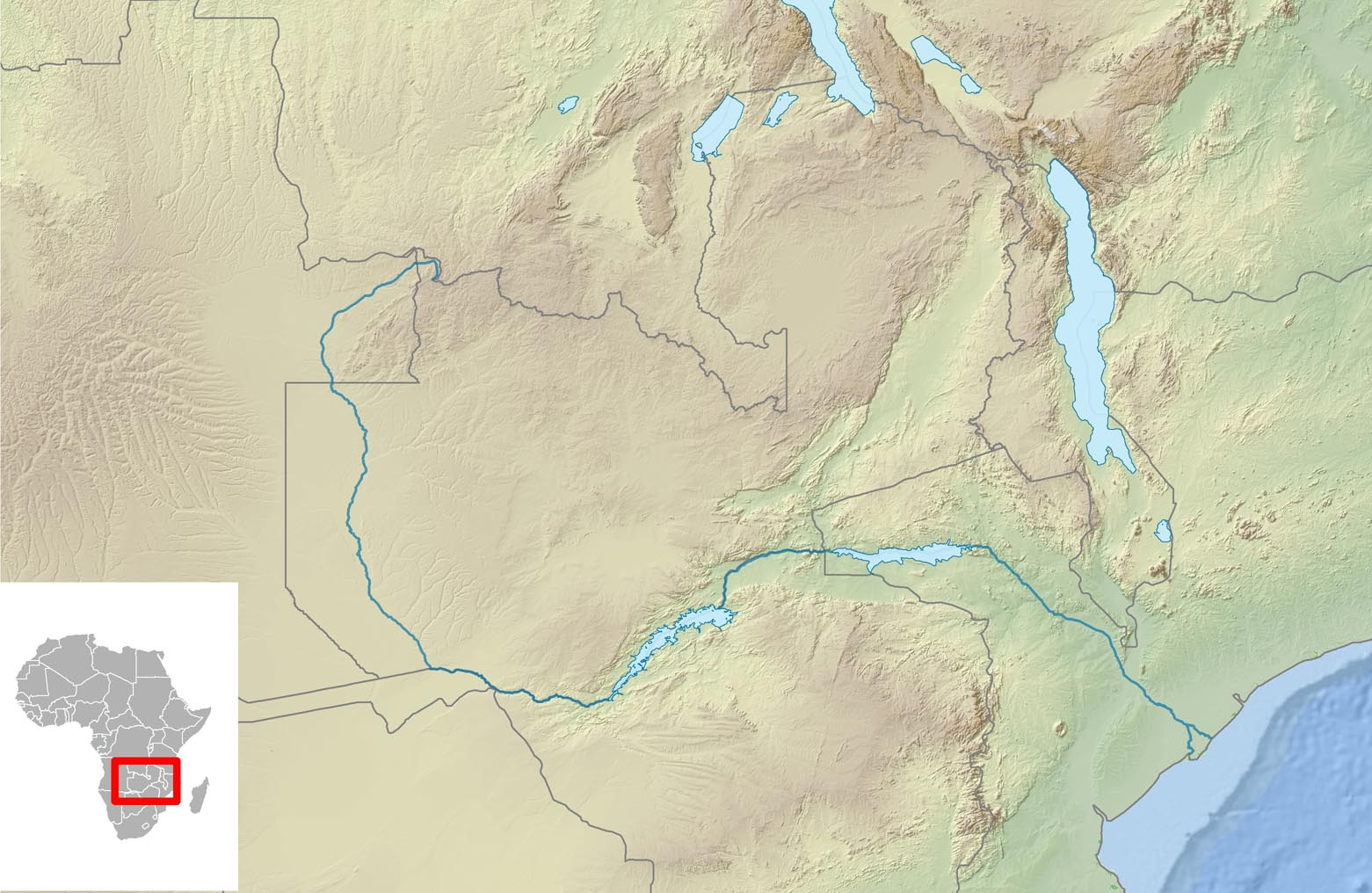
- Location of the dam in Mozambique Location on the Zambezi
- Interactive map of Cahora Bassa Dam
- Country: Mozambique
- Location: Tete
- Coordinates: 15°35′09″S 32°42′17″E
- Purpose: Power
- Status: Operational
- Construction began: 1969
- Opening date: 1979

Dam and spillways
- Impounds: Zambezi River
- Height: 171 m (561 ft)
- Length: 303 m (994 ft)

Reservoir
- Creates: Cahora Bassa Lake
- Total capacity: 55.8 ML (45.2 acre⋅ft)
- Catchment area: 56,927 km^{2} (21,980 sq mi)
- Surface area: 273.9 ha (677 acres)
- Maximum water depth: 157 m (515 ft)

Cahora Bassa hydroelectric plant
- Coordinates: 15°35′09″S 32°42′17″E
- Operator: Hidroeléctrica de Cahora Bassa
- Commission date: 1974
- Type: Conventional
- Turbines: 5 × 480 MW (640,000 hp) (all Francis-type)
- Installed capacity: 2,075 MW (2,783×10^{3} hp)
- Website www.hcb.co.mz

The Cahora Bassa Dam is a dam across the Zambezi River, located in Mozambique. Completed in 1979, the resultant reservoir, the Cahora Bassa Lake, was built principally for the generation of conventional hydroelectric power for use in South Africa.

The Cahora Bassa Dam is one of two major dams on the Zambezi, the other being the Kariba Dam. The project commenced in 1969 and, after much political debate, began to come online in 1979. Jointly owned by the governments of Mozambique and Portugal, from independence until 2007, eighteen percent share of the dam and its reservoir was owned by Mozambique and eighty-two percent by Portugal. In 2007, Portugal sold down its share to 15 percent. The Cahora Bassa Dam is the largest hydroelectric power plant in southern Africa and the most efficient power-generating station in Mozambique.

== History ==
Before construction began, native peasants protested against the dam in a bid to retain ownership and/or use of their farm land. When given the order to begin construction in 1969, the Portuguese colonial government of Mozambique forced the native peasants out of their homes and villages in order for the Portuguese and European workers to have a place to live during construction. The Portuguese government built a small town for all the contractors, electricians, and engineers on top of the native Mozambique homes. The evicted native peasants were not given compensation for their loss of property. In 2021, it was claimed that over one million peasants living downriver were adversely impacted by the dam; and that more than 42,000 people were displaced.

In addition to power generation, it was expected that the naming of the Zambezi would result in more irrigated farming, increased European settlement and mineral output, improved communication and transport throughout the valley, and reduced flooding events as a result of unpredictable and sometimes excess rainfall.

Construction begun in 1969, authorised by the colonial government, and the dam commenced filling in December 1974 and was just 12 metres (39 ft) below full supply level within six months. During the construction phase, long stretches of the power transmission lines were sabotaged during 16 years of Mozambican Civil War which ended in 1992. It was claimed that the South Africa apartheid government supported development of the dam in order to quell anti-colonial guerrilla forces such as the FRELIMO and its ally, the African National Congress (ANC). The dam was built to produce electricity for South African farms, mines, and cities. Since the dam transfers the electricity that it creates to South Africa, it takes electricity away from the natives who kept some of their land. In 2009, it was reported that the natives struggle to access electricity and a regular supply of clean drinking water.

== Description ==
The dam wall is 171 metres (561 ft) high and 303 metres (994 ft) long. The reservoir reached a maximum of approximately 250 kilometres (160 mi) long and 38 kilometres (24 mi) wide, flooding an area of 2,700 square kilometres (1,000 sq mi) with an average depth of 20.9 metres (69 ft).

Before 2010, the average annual rainfall was 94 centimetres (37 in); and was decreasing. In 2016, the average annual rainfall was 64 centimetres (25 in). It was suggested that if the average annual rainfall continues to decline, the dam operators may have to shut off the flow to some or all of the turbines. Doing so will conserve the water and energy until the reservoir is full enough to allow water to spin the turbines and create more electricity. Having some or all turbines will cause parts of South Africa to lose energy. During the plant shutdown, Songo and Apollo will have a fraction of the energy coming into the converter stations. These places will still be able to use electricity due to the energy that has been stored in a device called an accumulator or by using the pumping method. This method is done by pumping water into a reservoir and letting it go through a turbine when energy is needed.

The reservoir also sustains productive fisheries, supports over 4,000 hippos, and provides critical habitat for a rich diversity of wetland birds.

== Power station ==
The Cahora Bassa system is the largest hydroelectric scheme in southern Africa with the powerhouse containing five 415 megawatts (557,000 hp) turbines. Most of the power generated is exported to South Africa, which is done by the Cahora Bassa HVDC system, a set of high voltage direct current lines. The system includes two converter stations, one at Songo in Mozambique and the other at Apollo in South Africa. The plant generates 1,450 megawatts (1,940×10^{3} hp) from the water passing through the five turbines. This power is transferred over 1,800 kilometres (1,100 mi) of high voltage direct current lines that run from Songo to the power grids of South Africa. There are two parallel pylons between these two stations, covering 1,400 kilometres (870 mi), of which 900 kilometres (560 mi) is in Mozambican territory. These HVDC lines work at 533 kV and in Mozambique territory have approximately 4,200 towers.

=== Renovation and upgrade ===
In December 2022, Hidroeléctrica de Cahora Bassa (HCB), the operator of the power station, secured a loan worth US$125 million to rehabilitate and modernize the dam's infrastructure and operating systems. The EPC contactor for the rehabilitation is a consortium comprising Sweco from Sweden and Intertechne Consultores from Brazil. The renovations are expected to keep the power station's generating capacity at 2,075 megawatts (2.783×10^{6} hp), until 2050 at the minimum. Rehabilitation work was expected to conclude in 2025.

== Gallery ==
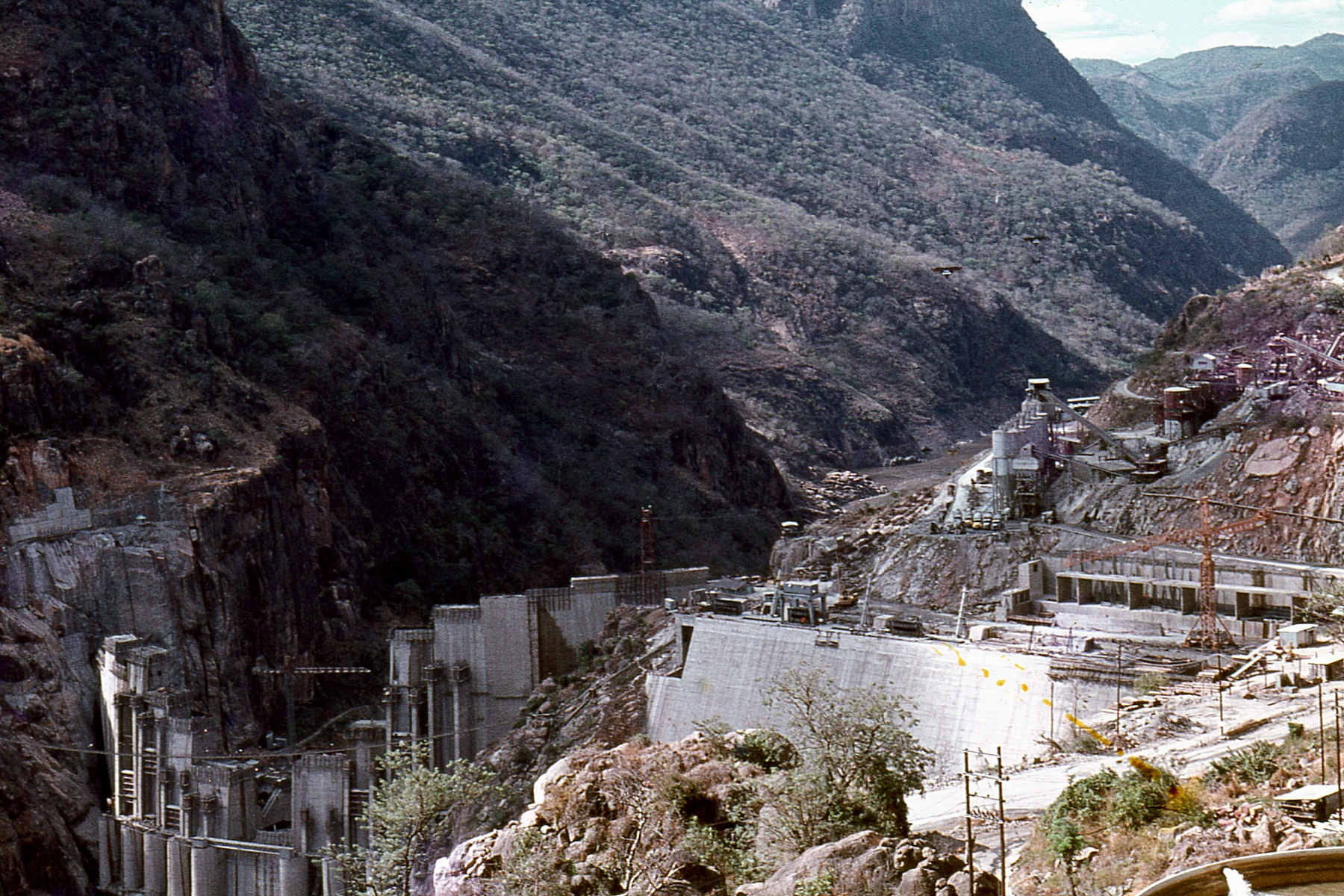
Construction of the dam in 1974

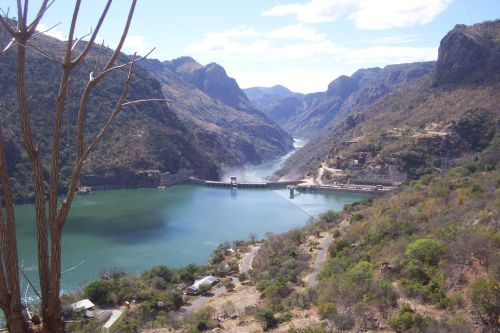
Cahora Bassa Dam upstream view

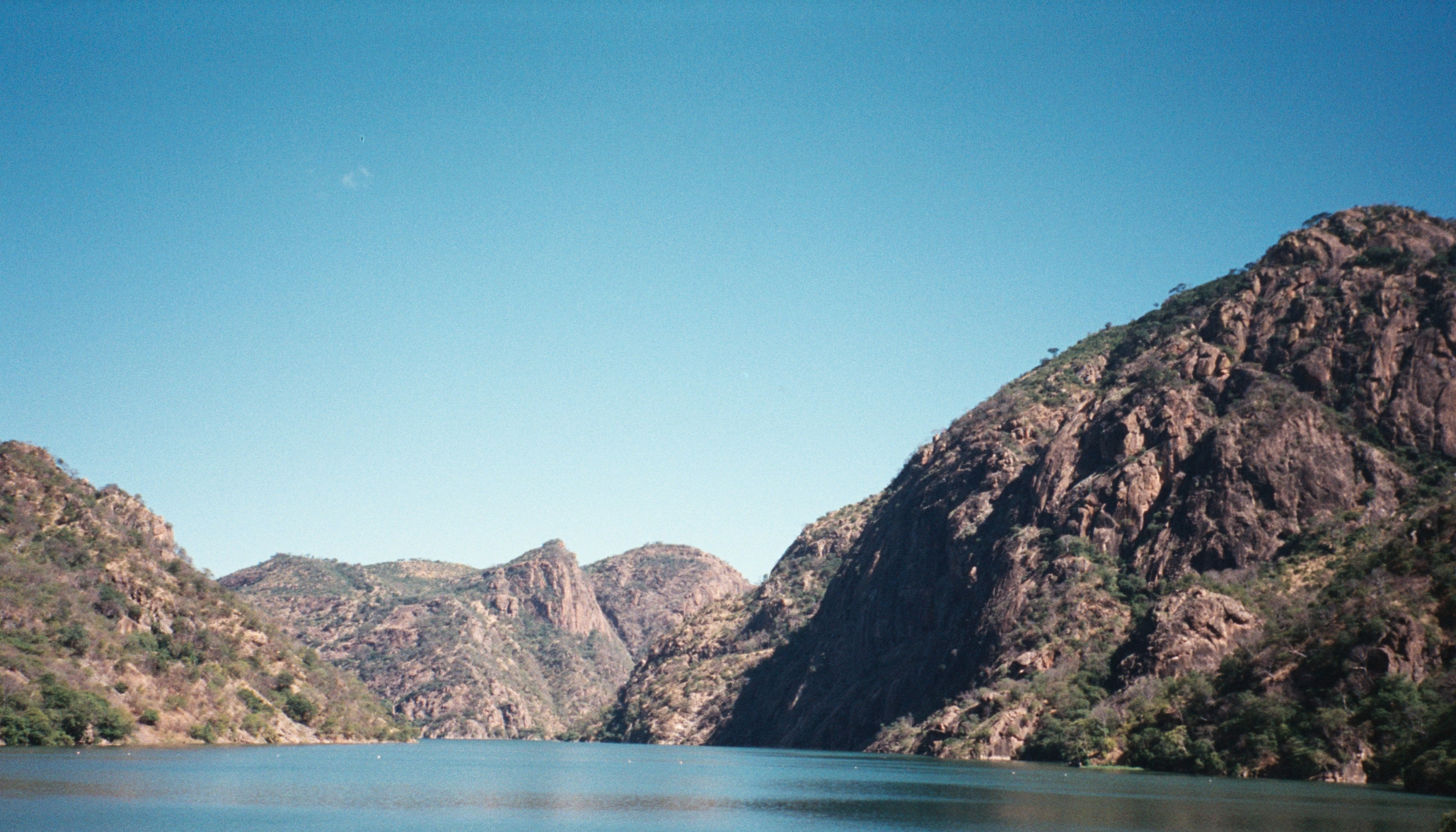
Cahora Bassa Dam

== See also ==
- Cabora Bassa Lake
- List of conventional hydroelectric power stations
- List of crossings of the Zambezi River
