= Electricidade de Moçambique =

Energy company of Mozambique

Eletrecidade de Moçambique, EP
- Company type: Public utility
- Industry: Energy
- Founded: 1995; 31 years ago
- Headquarters: Maputo, Moçambique
- Services: Electricity
- Revenue: ▲$ 751,78 million (2021)
- Net income: ▲$ 32,06 million (2021)
- Number of employees: 3,486 (2021)
- Website: https://edm.co.mz/

Electricidade de Moçambique, E.P. (EDM-E.P. or simply EDM) is a state-owned energy company of Mozambique, which deals with the generation, transmission, distribution and sale of electricity. EDM was incorporated in 1995 after the privatization of the state-managed enterprise Electricidade de Moçambique, Empresa Estatal (EDM-E.E.), which had been set up in 1977, two years after the independence of Mozambique, by the new government of the People's Republic of Mozambique led by the FRELIMO party. In 1977, EDM emerged from the amalgamation of twenty-five separate generation and distribution units geographically dispersed across Mozambique.

== List of Directors General (1977-1995) and Presidents of the Board of Administrators (since 1995) ==
Director Geral, Electricidade de Moçambique, E.E. (1977-1995)

- Rui Lousã (1977-1978)
- Fernando Julião (1978-1995)

Presidente do Conselho de Administração, Electricidade de Moçambique, E.P. (since 1995)

- Vicente Veloso (1995-2005)
- Manuel Cuambe (2005-2012)
- Augusto de Sousa Fernando (2012-2014)
- Gildo Sibumbe (2014-2015)
- Mateus Magala (2015-2018)
- Aly Sicola Impija (2019-2020)
- Marcelino Gildo Alberto (2020-...)
