= Espungabera =

- Location within Mozambique
- Coordinates: 20°27′11″S 32°46′21″E
- Country: Mozambique
- Provinces: Manica Province
- District: Mossurize District

Espungabera is a township in the Mossurize District of Manica Province in central Mozambique. It is situated 4 km (2.5 mi) from a border post with Zimbabwe. Espungabera has three fuel stations, but supplies can run out. The language spoken on either side of the border is chiNdau.

During the Frelimo–Renamo struggle of the late 1970s to early 1990s, it was one of the strategic towns where Forças Populares de Libertação de Moçambique (FPLM) maintained a heavy mechanized presence, since the Espungabera–Dombé–Chimoio road link, which offered access to Zimbabwe, was repeatedly attacked and disrupted by insurgents. In 2010 the Espungabera–Dombé road was being rehabilitated, which was expected to improve the area's economic and tourism potential.

The Pafuri border post with South Africa can be reached via Chitobe (in Machaze District) and Save Centro to Massangena or Zambaredja, but an off-road vehicle is required.

The town has two secondary schools, the Teresa Amuli Secondary School (full) and Joaquim Chissano Secondary (first cycle).
