= Assicante =

Coordinates: 19°47′13″S 33°21′05″E

Assicante is a hamlet in the Sussundenga District of Manica Province in central Mozambique. It is situated by the Sussundenga-Dombé road, beside the eastern foothills of the Chimanimani Mountains, and on the verge of the Moribane Forest. The language spoken locally is chiNdau.
