= List of Cultural Heritage Sites and Monuments in Mozambique =

List of Cultural Heritage Sites and Monuments in Mozambuque

No	Site	Province	District	City
1	Maputo International Airport	City of Maputo		
2	National Library of Mozambique	City of Maputo	Kamphumo	
3	The Laughing Lion Housing Block	City of Maputo	Kamphumo	
4	Yellow House (National Museum of Currency)	City of Maputo	Kamphumo	
5	Iron House	City of Maputo	Kamphumo	
6	House of Tiles	City of Maputo	Kamphumo	
7	Maputo Cathedral	City of Maputo	Kamphumo	
8	Upper Room of Faith	City of Maputo		
9	Maputo Municipal Council Building	City of Maputo	Kamphumo	
10	Maputo Post Office Building	City of Maputo	Kamphumo	
11	National Press Building	City of Maputo	Kamphumo	
12	Maputo Central Market Building	City of Maputo	Kamphumo	
13	Marine Biology Station	City of Maputo		
14	Maputo Central Railway Station	City of Maputo	Kamphumo	
15	Zimpeto National Stadium	City of Maputo		
16	Statue of Eduardo Mondlane	City of Maputo	Kamphumo	
17	Statue of Samora Moisés Machel	City of Maputo	Kamphumo	
18	Fortress of Our Lady of the Conception (Maputo Fortress)	City of Maputo	Kamphumo	
19	Polana Hotel	City of Maputo	Kamphumo	
20	Polana Church	City of Maputo	Kamphumo	
21	Tunduru Gardens	City of Maputo	Kamphumo	
22	Monument to the Dead of the First World War	City of Maputo		
23	Mozambique Natural History Museum	City of Maputo		
24	Palácio da Ponta Vermelha	City of Maputo		
25	Maputo Bullring	City of Maputo		
26	Indo-Portuguese Association	City of Maputo		
27	Marginal Avenue	City of Maputo		
28	People's Bazaar	City of Maputo		
29	Chamber of Commerce	City of Maputo		
30	Tile House	City of Maputo		
31	Malangatana House-Museum	City of Maputo		
32	Franco-Mozambican Cultural Center	City of Maputo		
33	His Highness Agha Khan's Building	City of Maputo		
34	Statue of Samora Machel	City of Maputo		
35	Maputo Central Hospital	City of Maputo		
36	Craft Market	City of Maputo		
37	Central Market	City of Maputo		
38	Janet Market	City of Maputo		
39	Fish Market	City of Maputo		
40	Xipamanine Market	City of Maputo		
41	Lower Mosque	City of Maputo		
42	Maputo Mosque	City of Maputo		
43	Louis Trichardt Memorial	City of Maputo		
44	Ministry of Foreign Affairs	City of Maputo		
45	Monument to Mozambican Heroes	City of Maputo		
46	Naguib Mural (Ode to Samora Machel)	City of Maputo		
47	National Museum of Art	City of Maputo		
48	National Museum of Geology	City of Maputo		
49	Museum of the Revolution	City of Maputo		
50	Art Center	City of Maputo		
51	Campos Rodrigues Meteorological Observatory	City of Maputo		
52	Wedding Palace	City of Maputo		
53	Heroes' Square	City of Maputo		
54	Workers' Square	City of Maputo		
55	Pott Building	City of Maputo		
56	Port of Maputo	City of Maputo		
57	Radio Mozambique (bronze panels)	City of Maputo		
58	Gil Vicente Theatre	City of Maputo		
59	Algarve Village	City of Maputo		
60	Machava Stadium	Matola, Maputo Province		
61	Alberto Chissano Museum	Matola, Maputo Province		
62	Sanctuary of Our Lady of Fatima	Namaacha, Maputo Province		
63	Oswald Hoffman House	Inhambane		
64	Bazaruto Lighthouse	Inhambane		
65	Ponta da Barra Lighthouse	Inhambane		
66	Fort of Our Lady of the Conception	Inhambane		
67	Old Church of Our Lady of the Conception	Inhambane		
68	Deportation Gate	Inhambane		
69	House of Beaks	Sofala		
70	Beira railway station	Sofala		
71	Fort of São Caetano de Sofala	Sofala		
72	Inhaca Island Lighthouse	Gaza		
73	Chilembene Historic Site	Gaza		
74	Nwadjahane Historic Site	Gaza		
75	Monument to Ngungunhane (Chaimite)	Gaza		
76	Fort of Dona Amélia of Massangano	Manica		
77	Barragem de Cahora Bassa	Tete		
78	Forte de São Tiago Maior do Tete	Tete		
79	Igreja de São José de Boroma (Changara)	Tete		
80	Missão de São José de Boroma	Tete		
81	Missão de Lifidzi - Ulónguè (Angónia)	Tete		
82	Monumento a Francisco Manyanga – Charre (Mutarara)	Tete		
83	Ponte Dona Ana	Tete		
84	Quelimane Fort	Zambezia		
85	Old Cathedral	Zambezia		
86	Chapel of Our Lady of the Bulwark	Nampula		
87	São Sebastião Fortress	Nampula		
88	Fort of Saint Anthony	Nampula		
89	Fort of Saint Lawrence	Nampula		
90	Church of Mercy	Nampula		
91	Church of Our Lady of Health	Nampula		
92	Church of Saint Anthony	Nampula		
93	Palace of the Captains-General	Nampula		
94	Convent of Saint Dominic	Nampula		
95	Museum of Ethnography	Nampula	City of Nampula	
96	Nampula Catholic Cathedral	Nampula	City of Nampula	
97	Pinda Lighthouse	Nampula		
98	House of the Mueda Massacre	Cabo Delgado		
99	Ibo Fortifications	Cabo Delgado		
100	Cabo Delgado Lighthouse	Cabo Delgado		
101	Church of Our Lady of Consolation of Massangulo	Niassa		
