= Vanduzi District =

District of Mozambique

Coordinates: 18.946°S 33.263°E

Location map of Vanduzi District.

Vanduzi District is a district in Manica Province of Mozambique.

== Geography ==
The district has an area of 2,825 km^{2}. It is bounded on the west by Manica District, on the northwest by Barue District, on the northeast by Macossa District and Sofala Province, on the east by Gondola District, on the southeast by Chimoio District, and on the south by Macate and Sussundenga districts.

== Population ==
The district has a population of 140,476, and a population density of 50 persons per km^{2}.

== Administration ==
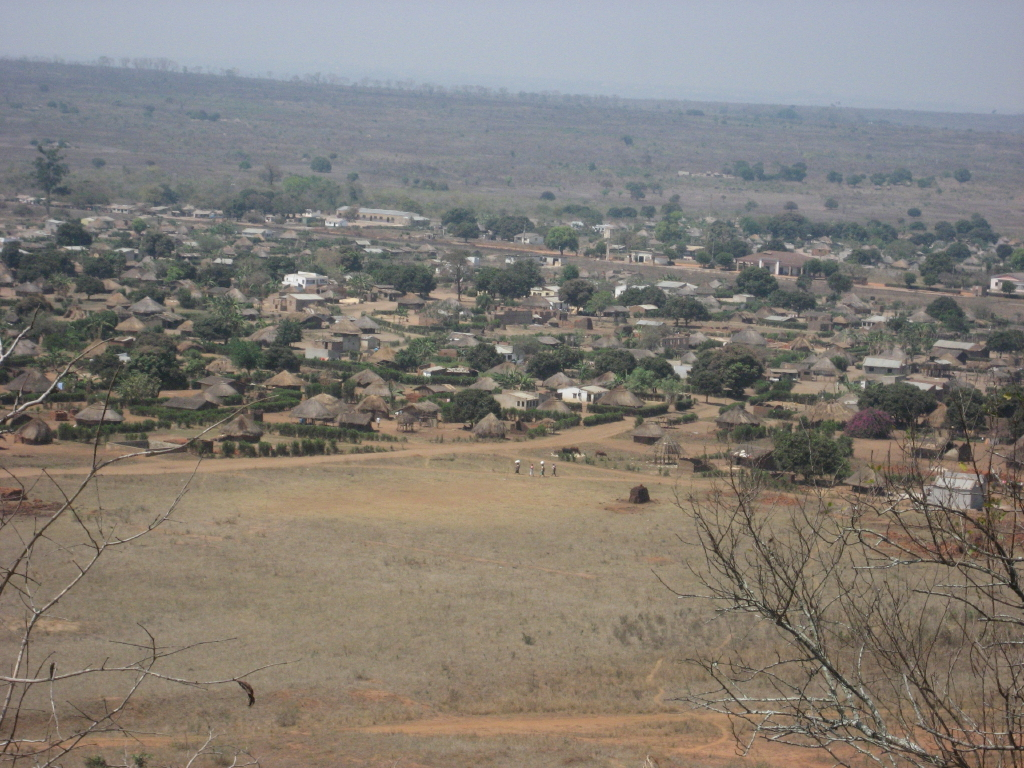
Matsinho village

The administrative headquarters for the district is in the town of Vanduzi.

The district is divided into two administrative postos, Matsinho (two localities, Chiremera and Matsinho) and Vanduzi (three localities, Chigodore, Pungué Sul, and Vanduzi).

== History ==
Vanduzi District was created by the Mozambican legislature in 2013. Prior to that, Vanduzi posto was part of Manica District, and Matsinho posto was part of Gondola District.
