= Dombé =

Coordinates: 19°58′30″S 33°23′46″E

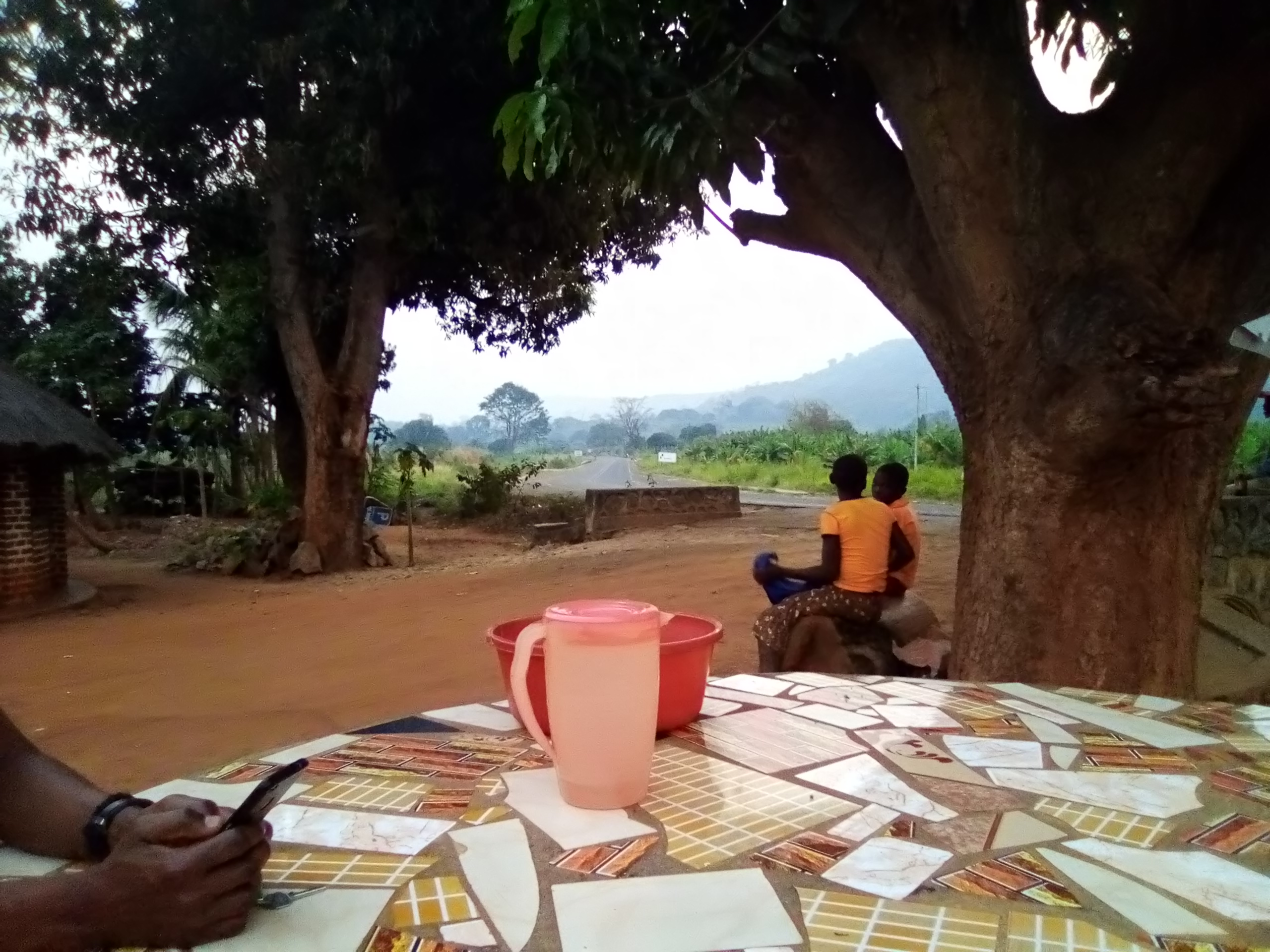
A village at Dombé

Dombé is a town and a posto on the north bank of the Buzi River in Sussundenga District of Manica Province in central Mozambique. During the Frelimo-Renamo struggle of the 70s to early 90s it was a strategic town where the FPLM maintained a heavy mechanized presence, since the Chimoio-Dombé-Espungabera road link which offered access to Zimbabwe was repeatedly attacked and disrupted by insurgents. In 2010 the Dombé-Espungabera road was being rehabilitated, which was expected to improve the area's economic and tourism potential. The road is easier to travel during the dry months, from May to November, and then at about 50 km/h. Dombé has a fuel station but supplies can run out.Shaddy Júnior

== Villages ==
The administrative territory of the posto of Dombé in the Sussundenga District covers four localities, among which:

- Assicante

== See also ==
- Moribane Forest
