= Macate District, Mozambique =

District of Mozambique

Location map of Vanduzi District.

Macate District is a district in Manica Province of Mozambique.

== Geography ==
The district has an area of 1,550 km^{2}. It is bounded on the north by Chimoio District, on the northwest and west by Gondola District, on the southwest by Sofala Province, on the east by Gondola District, on the southeast by Chimoio District, on the south and southeast by Sussundenga District, and on the east by Vanduzi District.

== Population ==
The district has a population of 106,410, and a population density of 69 persons per km^{2}.

== Administration ==
The administrative headquarters for the district is in the town of Macate.

The district is divided into two administrative postos, Macate (with four localities, Chissassa, Macate, Maconha, and Marera) and Zembe (with two localities, Boavista and Charonga).

== History ==
Vanduzi District was created by the Mozambican legislature in 2013. Prior to that it was part of Gondola District.
