= Choa Mountains =

Mountain range in Mozambique

Coordinates: 18.01691°S 33.18325°E

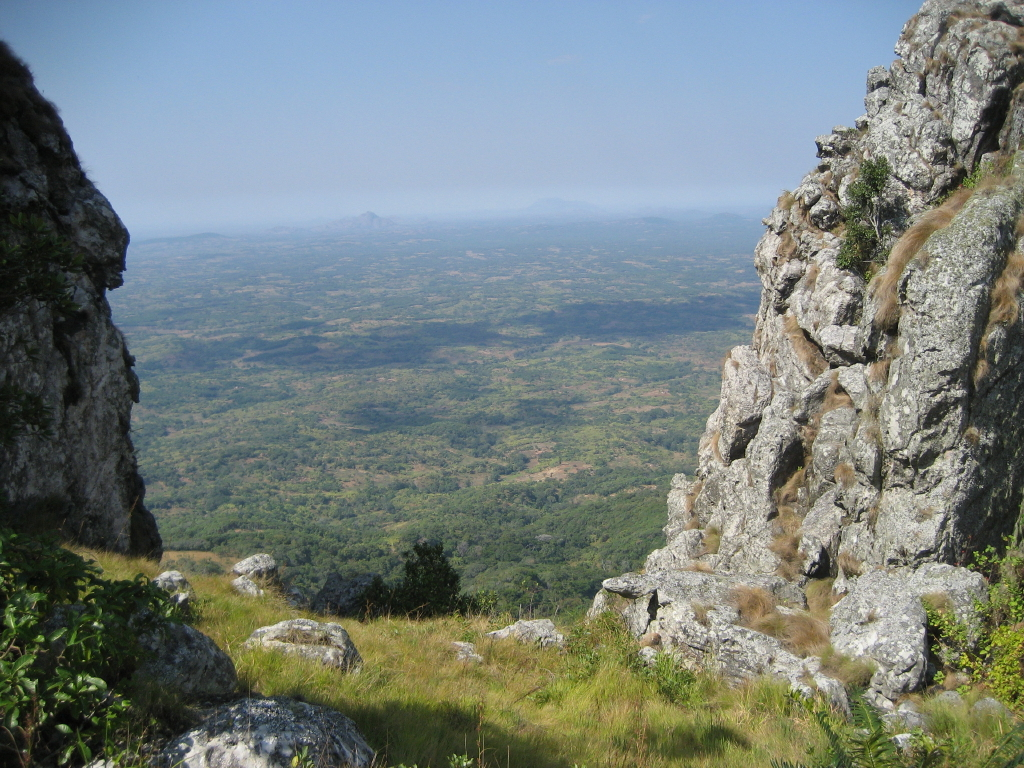
View of the Mozambican plains from Serra Nhatoa, Choa Mountains

The Choa Mountains (Portuguese: Serra Choa) are a mountain range in Manica Province of Mozambique. The mountains lie in Báruè District, west of Catandica.

The mountains are at the northern end of the Eastern Highlands. The higher Nyanga Mountains lie to the southwest.

The eastern slope of the mountains rises steeply from the surrounding plateau, forming a 20km-long escarpment northwest of Catandica. Small areas of the range exceed 1500 meters elevation, and Serra Nhatoa, the highest peak, is over 1850 meters.

The western slopes of the mountains are drained by the Gairezi River, which flows northwards towards the Zambezi River from its source in the Nyanga Mountains. The eastern slopes of the mountains are drained by the Nhazonia River (also known as the Nyadzonya River), a tributary of the Pungwe River.

The mountains are mostly covered in miombo woodland. The eastern slopes intercept winds from the Indian Ocean, and the resulting orographic precipitation sustain lush montane grasslands with pockets of montane evergreen forest at higher elevations. On the high western slopes, montane grasslands interspersed with protea shrubs are prevalent.
