= Manica =

Manica may refer to:

- Manyika kingdom, a precolonial state in southeastern Africa
  - Manyika people
  - Manyika language
- Manica Province, a province of Mozambique
  - Manica, Mozambique, a town
- Manicaland Province, a province of Zimbabwe
- Manica, a part of the male Lepidoptera genitalia
- Manica (armguard), armguards used by Roman legionaries and gladiators
- Manica (ant), a genus of ants
- HMS Manica, kite balloon ship of the British Royal Navy
- MANICA Architecture, an architecture firm
