= Plumtree–Bulawayo–Harare–Mutare Highway =

Cross country international standard highway in Zimbabwe

The Plumtree-Bulawayo-Harare-Mutare Highway is a cross country international standard highway in Zimbabwe. It connects Mutare with Plumtree via Harare and Bulawayo. It is formed by two routes, namely the R5 Road (Mutare - Harare) and the R2 Road (Harare - Plumtree).

It is the most convenient route for transit motorists travelling between the Machipanda Border Post with Mozambique and the Plumtree Border Post with Botswana.

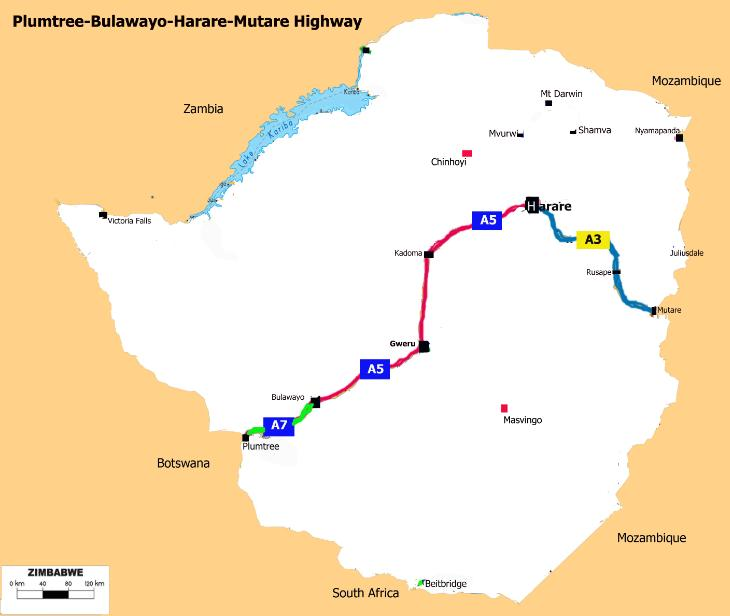
Plumtre-Mutare Highway

== Background ==
The highway has been attended to meet international standards and the rehabilitation project undertaken by Infralink, a joint venture between ZINARA (Zimbabwe National Roads Administration) and Group Five International of South Africa includes the R2 (Harare-Bulawayo Road & the Bulawayo-Plumtree Road combined) and the R5 (Harare-Mutare Highway) at a cost of US$206 million loan provided by the Development Bank of Southern Africa was complete by May 2015.

Zinara had 70 percent and Group Five International 30 percent shareholding in the Infralink Joint Venture rehabilitating the road and constructing Toll Plazas.

However, by November 2016 some sections of the road were being worked again. The hands-on contractor had not done a thorough job.

Overally the road standard is satisfactory though.

== R2 Highway ==
Source: [Map 9.2 Road Transport Network of Zimbabwe.]

This one is the merger of the A5 and the A7 forming a single road connecting Harare with Gaborone the capital of Botswana through Plumtree Border Post.

== R5 Highway ==
Source: [Map 9.2 Road Transport Network of Zimbabwe.]

This is the A3 in international standards, connecting Harare to Maputo the capital of Mozambique through Mutare's Machipanda Border Post (Forbes Border Post).

== See also ==
- R2
- R5
- A5
- A7
