= Mabote District =

Coordinates: 22.041°S 34.132°E

Mabote
- District
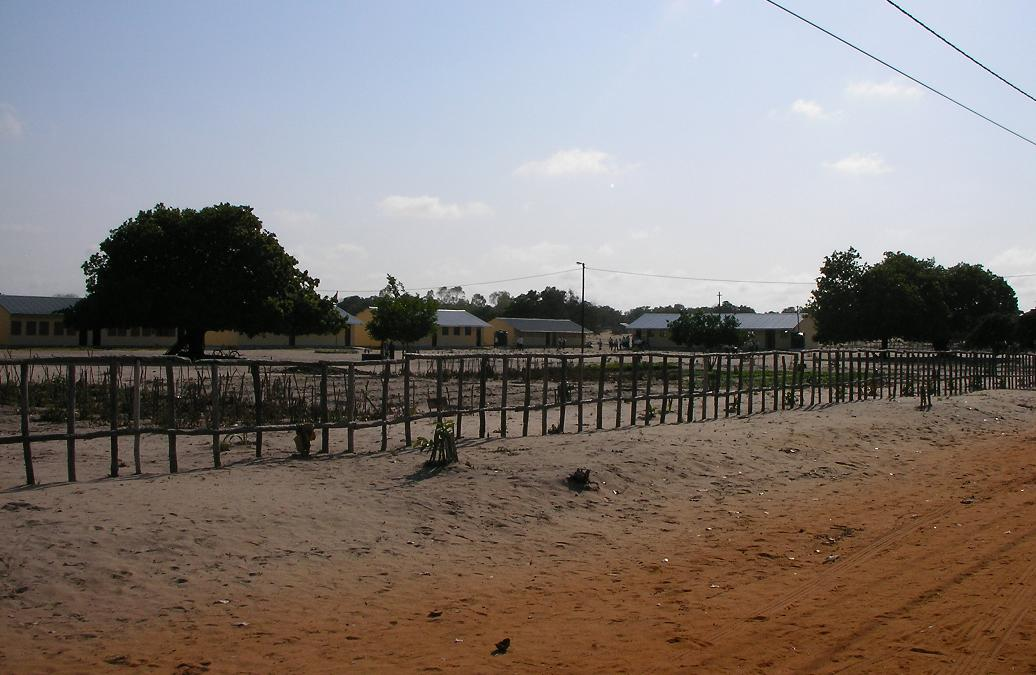
- Buildings in Mabote

- Mabote District on the map of Mozambique
- Country: Mozambique
- Province: Inhambane
- Capital: Mabote

Area
  - Total: 14,577 km^{2} (5,628 sq mi)

Population (2007 census)
  - Total: 45,101
  - Density: 3.0940/km^{2} (8.0134/sq mi)

Mabote District is a district of Inhambane Province in south-east Mozambique. Its principal town is Mabote. The district is located at the northwest of the province and borders with Machaze District of Manica Province and Machanga District of Sofala Province in the north, Govuro District in the east, Inhassoro District in the southeast, Funhalouro District in the south, and with Chigubo and Massangena Districts of Gaza Province in the west. The area of the district is 14,577 square kilometres (5,628 mi^{2}). In terms of the area, this is the biggest district of Inhambane Province. It has a population of 45101 as of 2007.

== Geography ==
The Save River borders the district in its northern part. There are no other rivers of any size in the district; several existing lakes are seasonal and only exist during the rainy season.

The climate is tropical arid, with the annual rainfall being around 600 millimetres (24 in).

Zinave National Park is located in the district. It has the area of 3,700 square kilometres (1,400 mi^{2}) and occupies about a quarter of the total area of the district.

== History ==
In 1986, Mabote District, which was previously a posto belonging to Govuro District, was made a separate district.

== Administrative divisions ==
The district is divided into three postos, Mabote, Zimane, and Zinave, which in total include eight localities.

== Demographics ==
As of 2005, 41% of the population of the district was younger than 15 years. 17% did speak Portuguese. The population was predominantly Tswa, speaking Tswa language. 81% were analphabetic, mostly women.

== Economy ==
There is limited production of natural gas in the district.

=== Agriculture ===
The district has 10,000,000 hectares (39,000 mi^{2}) of agricultural lands. The main agricultural products are corn, sorghum, peanuts, and cowpea.

=== Transportation ===
The road between Mabote and Mapihnahe, 120 kilometres (75 mi) long, provides connection to the national road EN1. Most of the 500 kilometres (310 mi) of secondary roads become impassable in the rainy season.
