= Chibabava District =

Coordinates: 20.292°S 33.531°E

Chibabava
- District
- Chibabava District on the map of Mozambique
- Country: Mozambique
- Province: Sofala
- Capital: Chibabava

Area
  - Total: 6,977 km^{2} (2,694 sq mi)

Population (2007 census)
  - Total: 101,667
  - Density: 14.57/km^{2} (37.74/sq mi)

Chibabava District is a district of Sofala Province in Mozambique. The principal town is Chibabava. The district is located in the south of the province, and borders with Buzi District in the north, Machanga District in the southeast, with Machaze and Mossurize Districts of Manica Province in the west, and with Sussundenga District of Manica Province in the northwest. The area of the district is 6,977 square kilometres (2,694 mi^{2}). It has a population of 101,667 as of 2007.

== Geography ==
The principal rivers in the district are the Buzí River, the Revué River, and the Lucito River.

The climate of the district is tropical humid in the east, close to the coast, and tropical semi-arid dry in the interior. The average annual rainfall in the interior varies between 500 millimetres (20 in) and 800 millimetres (31 in).

== Demographics ==
As of 2005, 43% of the population of the district was younger than 15 years. 16% of the population spoke Portuguese. The most common mothertongue among the population was Cindau. 85% were analphabetic, mostly women.

== Administrative divisions ==
The district is divided into three postos, Chibabava (two localities), Goonda (two localities), and Muxúngue (two localities).

== Economy ==
Less than 1% of the households in the district have access to electricity.

=== Agriculture ===
In the district, there are 13,000 farms which have on average 1.9 hectares (0.0073 mi^{2}) of land. The main agricultural products are corn, cassava, cowpea, peanut, sorghum, and sweet potato.

=== Transportation ===
There is a road network in the district which is 435 kilometres (270 mi) long and includes a 202 kilometres (126 mi) stretch of the national road EN1, which crosses the district from south to north. There is also an airfield.
