= Báruè District =

Coordinates: 18.061495°S 33.168666°E

Báruè
- District
- Báruè District on the map of Mozambique
- Country: Mozambique
- Province: Manica
- Capital: Catandica

Area
  - Total: 5,743 km^{2} (2,217 sq mi)

Population (2007 census)
  - Total: 137,582
  - Density: 23.96/km^{2} (62.05/sq mi)

Báruè District is a district of Manica Province in western Mozambique. Its most populous town and administrative centre is Catandica. The district is located in the west of the province, and borders with Guro District in the north, Macossa District in the east, Gondola District in the southeast, Manica District in the south, and with the Nyanga District of Zimbabwe in the west. The area of the district is 5,743 square kilometres (2,217 mi^{2}). It has a population of 137,582 as of 2007.

== Geography ==
The Pandira River, Tchatola River, and Gairezi River form the eastern boundary with Zimbabwe. The Mupha River, a tributary of the Gairezi, forms the northern border with Guro District. The Pungwe River forms the southern border with Manica and Gondola districts.

According to the Köppen climate classification, the district has tropical wet and dry climate, except for the Choa Mountains, where it is tropical humid. The annual rainfall varies between 1,000 millimetres (39 in) and 1,700 millimetres (67 in).

== Demographics ==
As of 2005, 49% of the population of the district was younger than 15 years. 29% did speak Portuguese. The most common mothertongue is Chitwe language. 69% were analphabetic, mostly women.

== Administrative divisions ==
The district is divided into three postos, Nhampassa (three localities), Catandica (three localities), and Serra Chôa (two localities).

== Economy ==
1% of the households in the district have access to electricity.

=== Agriculture ===
In the district, there are 15,000 farms which have on average 2.0 hectares (0.0077 mi^{2}) of land. The main agricultural products are corn, cassava, cowpea, peanut, sorghum, and sweet potato.

=== Transportation ===
There is a road network in the district which includes 146 kilometres (91 mi) of the national road EN102 connecting Chimoio and Tete.
