= Machanga District =

Coordinates: 20.940°S 34.959°E

Machanga
- District
- Machanga District on the map of Mozambique
- Country: Mozambique
- Province: Sofala
- Capital: Machanga

Area
  - Total: 5,940 km^{2} (2,290 sq mi)

Population (2007 census)
  - Total: 51,855
  - Density: 8.73/km^{2} (22.6/sq mi)

Machanga District is a district of Sofala Province in Mozambique. The principal town is Machanga. The district is located in the south of the province, and borders with Buzi District in the north, Mabote and Govuro Districts of Inhambane Province in the south, Machaze District of Manica Province in the west, and with Chibabava District in the northwest. In the east, the district is limited by the Indian Ocean. The area of the district is 5,940 square kilometres (2,290 mi^{2}). It has a population of 51,855 as of 2007.

== Geography ==
The principal river in the district is the Save River, which separates it from Inhambane Province.

According to the Köppen climate classification, the climate of the district is tropical wet and dry (Aw), with the average annual rainfall varying between 870 millimetres (34 in) and 880 millimetres (35 in).

== History ==
The district was established on 25 July 1986.

== Demographics ==
As of 2005, 46% of the population of the district was younger than 15 years. 25% did speak Portuguese. The most common mothertongue is Cindau. 81% were analphabetic, mostly women.

== Administrative divisions ==
The district is divided into three postos, Machanga (one locality), Divinhe (three localities), and Chiloane (two localities).

== Economy ==
Less than 1% of the households in the district have access to electricity.

=== Agriculture ===
In the district, there are 8,000 farms which have on average 1.0 hectare (0.0039 mi^{2}) of land. The main agricultural products are corn, cassava, cowpea, peanut, sorghum, sweet potato, and rice.

=== Transportation ===
There road network in the district is underdeveloped and consists of two secondary roads, ER428 and ER429, in a bad state.
