= Manica District =

Coordinates: 18°56′04″S 32°52′32″E

Manica
- District
- Manica District on the map of Mozambique
- Country: Mozambique
- Province: Manica
- Capital: Manica

Area
  - Total: 4,594 km^{2} (1,774 sq mi)

Population (2007 census)
  - Total: 213,206
  - Density: 46.41/km^{2} (120.2/sq mi)

Manica District is a district of Manica Province in western Mozambique. The principal town is Manica. The district is located in the west of the province, and borders with Báruè District in the north, Vanduzi District in the east, Sussundenga District in the south, and with Zimbabwe in the west. The area of the district is 4,594 square kilometres (1,774 mi^{2}). It has a population of 213,206 as of 2007.

== Geography ==
The main river in the district is the Revuè River, a major tributary of the Buzi River, with its tributaries.

According to the Köppen climate classification, the climate of the district is tropical humid (Cw), with the annual rainfall varying between 1,000 millimetres (39 in) and 1,200 millimetres (47 in).

== Demographics ==
As of 2005, 46% of the population of the district was younger than 15 years. 50% did speak Portuguese. The most common mothertongue is Chitwe language. 51% were analphabetic, mostly women.

== Administrative divisions ==
The district is divided into five postos, Manica (one locality), Machipanda (two localities), Messica (three localities), Mavonde (two localities), and Vanduzi (three localities).

In 2013, the Mozambican government created Vanduzi District out of Manica District.

== Economy ==
5% of the households in the district have access to electricity.

=== Agriculture ===
In the district, there are 37,000 farms which have on average 1.3 hectares (0.0050 mi^{2}) of land. The main agricultural products are corn, cassava, cowpea, peanut, sorghum, sweet potato, and rice.

=== Transportation ===
There is a road network in the district 386 kilometres (240 mi) long. This includes 130 kilometres (81 mi) of national roads, which connect Beira with Zimbabwe.

A railroad connecting Beira with Zimbabwe via Machipanda crosses the district.
