= Beira–Bulawayo railway =

Railway line in southern Africa

The Beira–Bulawayo railway
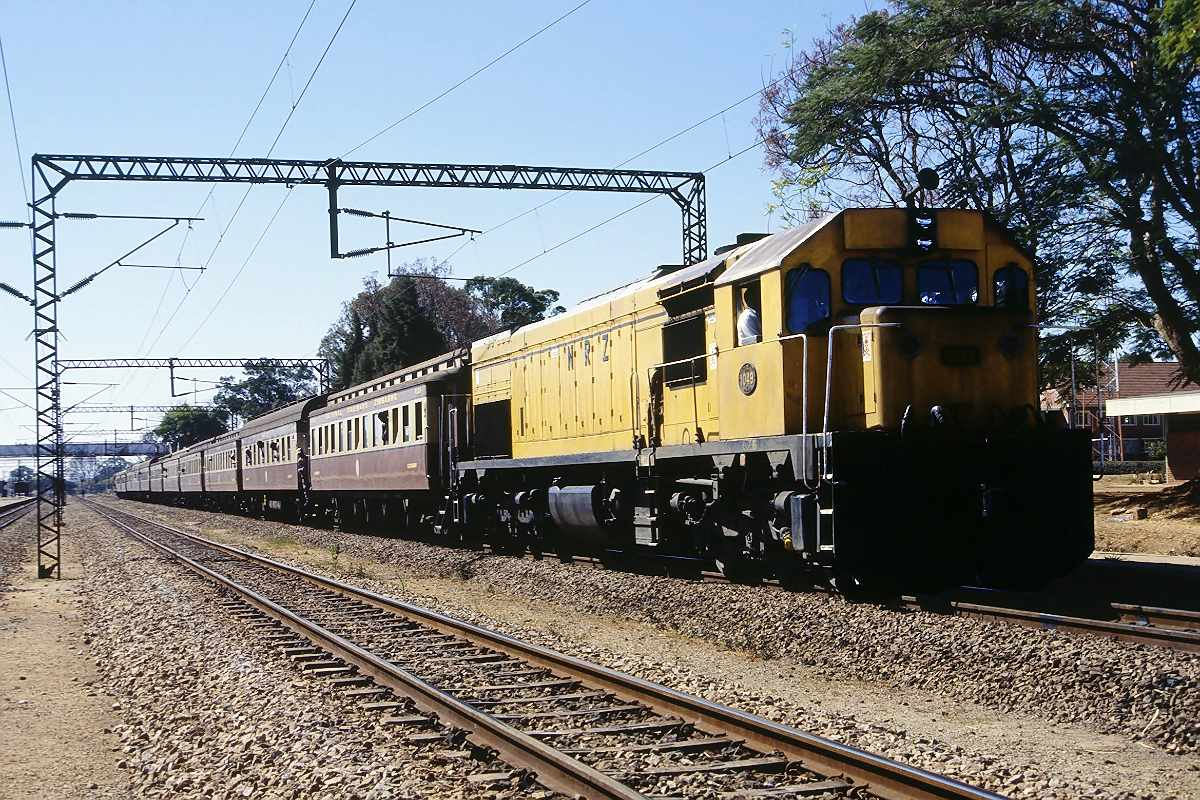

Overview
- Status: Operational
- Termini: Port of Beira, Beira, Mozambique; Bulawayo, Zimbabwe

Service
- Type: Cape gauge
- Operator(s): NRZ and CFM

History
- Opened: 1900

Technical
- Line length: 850 km (530 mi)
- Track gauge: 1,067 mm (3 ft 6 in)

Beira-Bulawayo railway, also called Machipanda railway, Beira-Harare-Bulawayo railway and Beira railway, is a railway that connects the city of Beira, Mozambique, to the city of Bulawayo, in Zimbabwe. It is 850 km long, in a 1067 mm gauge.

On the Mozambican stretch, between Beira and Machipanda, the managing company is Mozambique Ports and Railways (CFM); on the Zimbabwean stretch, between the cities of Mutare, Harare, Gweru and Bulawayo, the administration is done by the company National Railways of Zimbabwe (NRZ).

Its main maritime logistics facility is the port of Beira.

== History ==
Originally, the Beira–Bulawayo railway was to establish a rail connection between Salisbury and Beira, according to the understanding celebrated in the 1870s between Portuguese East Africa and the Company rule in Rhodesia.

However, due to financial difficulties with the Portuguese partners, the construction of the first stretch of the Beira–Bulawayo railway started only in 1892; the infrastructure, in narrow gauge of 610 mm, connected, already on 4 February 1898, Beira to the border city Umtali, in Southern Rhodesia (later Rhodesia; now Zimbabwe), covering 357 kilometres.

In 1898, a 1,067 mm gauge line was opened from Salisbury to Umtali, with subsequent conversion of the 610 mm narrow gauge section connecting to Beira in 1900.

Still in the 1890s, work began on extending the original project, starting from Bulawayo, in Southern Rhodesia (later Rhodesia; now Zimbabwe), to build a 1,067 mm railway to the north, up to Salisbury, which was definitively completed in 1899. After the conversion of Umtali (1067 mm) and Machipanda (610 mm), the line finally connected Bulawayo, Gwelo (now Gweru), Salisbury (now Harare), Umtali (now Mutare), Manica, Chimoio (known as Vila Pery under Portuguese rule), Dondo and Beira.

The 610 mm narrow gauge locomotives were subsequently purchased from the South African Railways and are designated "SAR class NG6".

Subsequently the stretch between Machipanda and Beira was adapted to the Rhodesian (now Zimbabwean) standard, being fully converted to 1,067 mm, eliminating the need for the conversion of Umtali-Machipanda.

In 2005, the Mozambican stretch of the line, between the cities of Beira and Machipanda, was privatised. for the Beira Railroad Corporation (CCFB). Reconstruction of the railway was started, but the company was unable to fulfill the contract. The Mozambican stretch of the line was re-nationalized in 2011 for the company Mozambique Ports and Railways (CFM).

== Railway branches ==
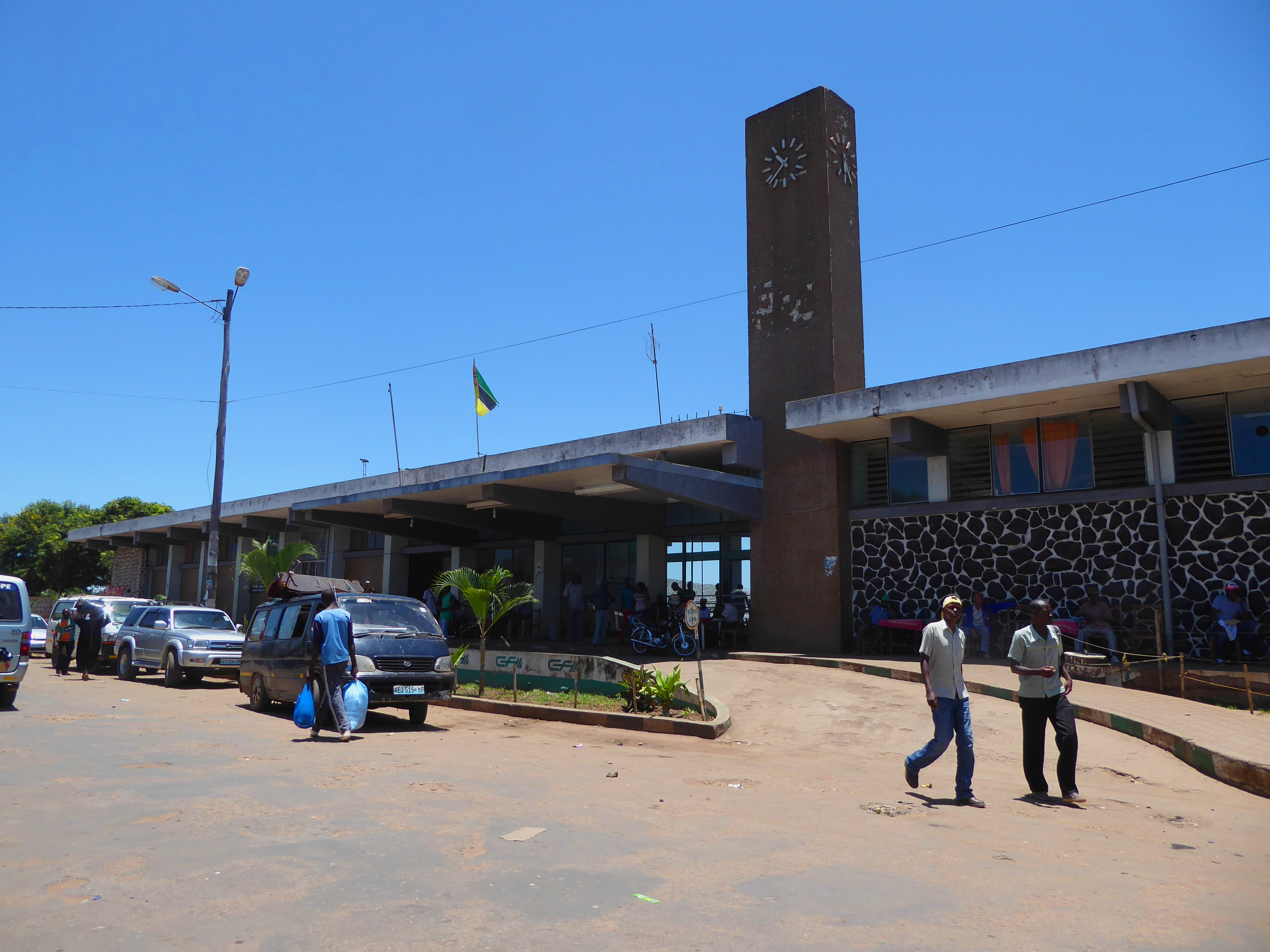
Chimoio train station, Mozambique, 2016.

The Beira–Bulawayo railway has four important branches:

- Chinhoyi branch: connects the city of Harare to the village of Chinhoyi.
  - Maryland-Kildonan branch: a sub-branch of the Harare-Chinhoyi branch, which leaves from the village of Maryland and goes to the village of Kildonan.
  - Bindura branch: a sub-branch of the Harare-Chinhoyi branch, which leaves from the city of Harare and goes to the village of Shamva.
- Gweru-Masvingo branch: connects the city of Gweru to the city of Masvingo.
  - Shurugwi branch: a sub-branch of the Gweru-Masvingo branch, which leaves from the city of Gweru and goes to the village of Shurugwi.
- Incisa branch: in the city of Incisa.
- Redcliff branch: in the town of Redcliff.

== Railway connections ==
In Dondo, the Beira–Bulawayo line connects with the Sena railway.

In Somabhula, the Beira–Bulawayo line connects with the Limpopo railway.

In Umzingwane, the Beira–Bulawayo line connects with the Beitbridge-Bulawayo railway.

In Bulawayo, the Beira–Bulawayo line connects with the Cape to Cairo Railway.

== Main railway stations ==
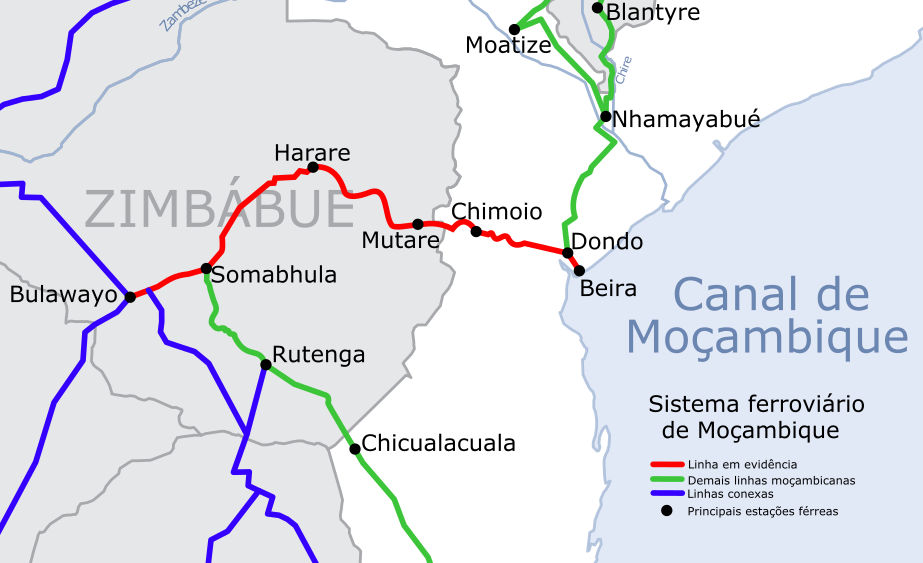
Beira–Bulawayo railway map (red line); railways with junction (in green); other railway routes (in blue).

The main railway stations of the Beira–Bulawayo railway are:

- Beira
- Dondo
- Chimoio
- Manica
- Machipanda
- Mutare
- Rusape
- Harare
- Kadoma
- Gweru
- Somabhula
- Bulawayo
