= Catandica =

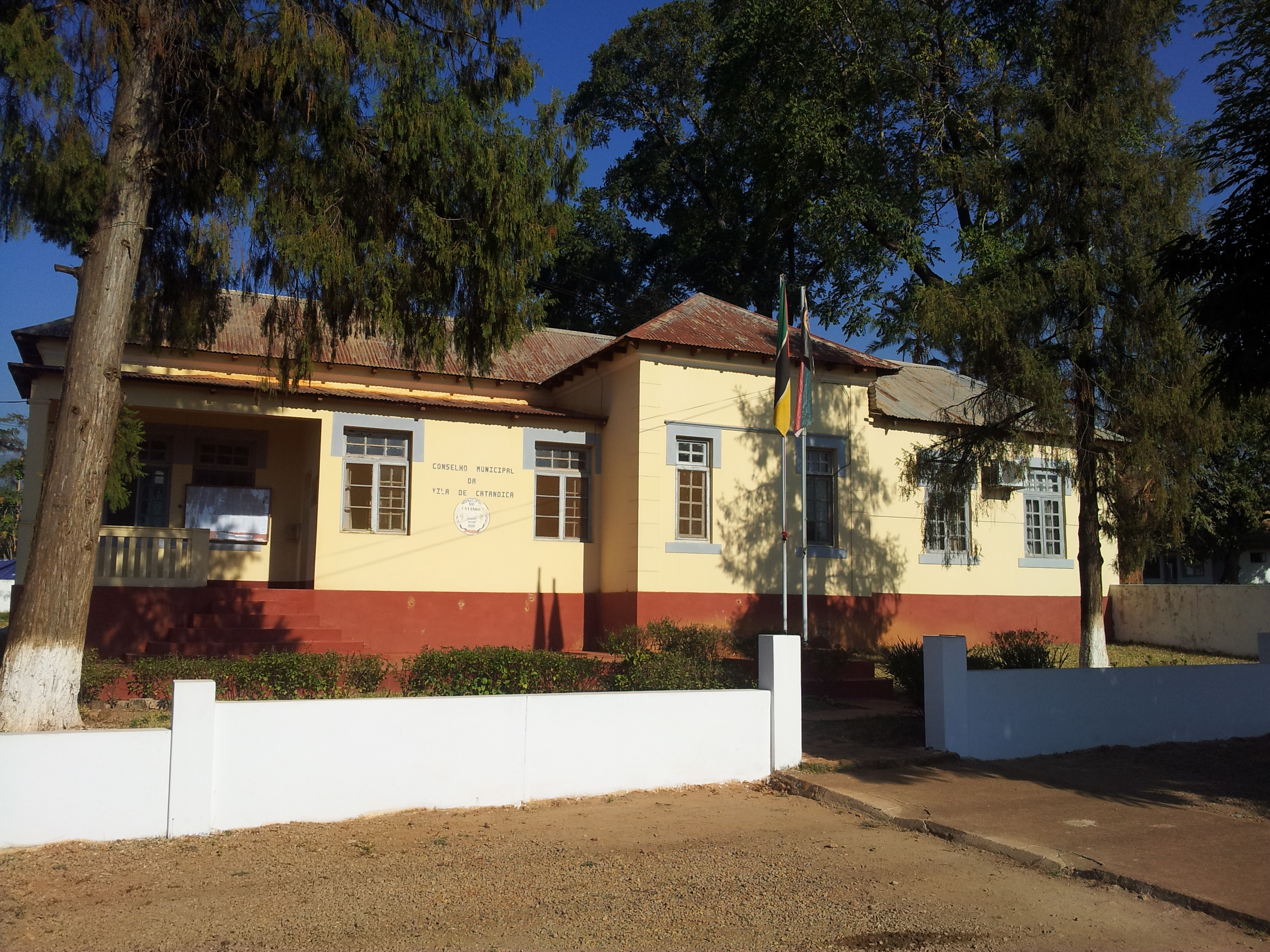
- Municipal Council of Catandica, Mozambique

- Location within Mozambique
- Coordinates: 18°3′23″S 33°10′29″E
- Country: Mozambique
- Provinces: Manica Province
- District: Báruè District

Population (2008)
  - Total: 29,052
- Climate: Cwa

Catandica (before independence known as Vila Gouveia) is a town located in the province of Manica in Mozambique. It is the administrative center of Báruè District and its most populous town. As of 2008 it had a population of 29,052.

The town, near the border with Zimbabwe, takes its name from the son of a local chief who had served in the Mozambican army.
