= Moribane Forest Reserve =

Protected area in Mozambique

- Reserva Florestal de Moribane
- IUCN category IV (habitat/species management area)
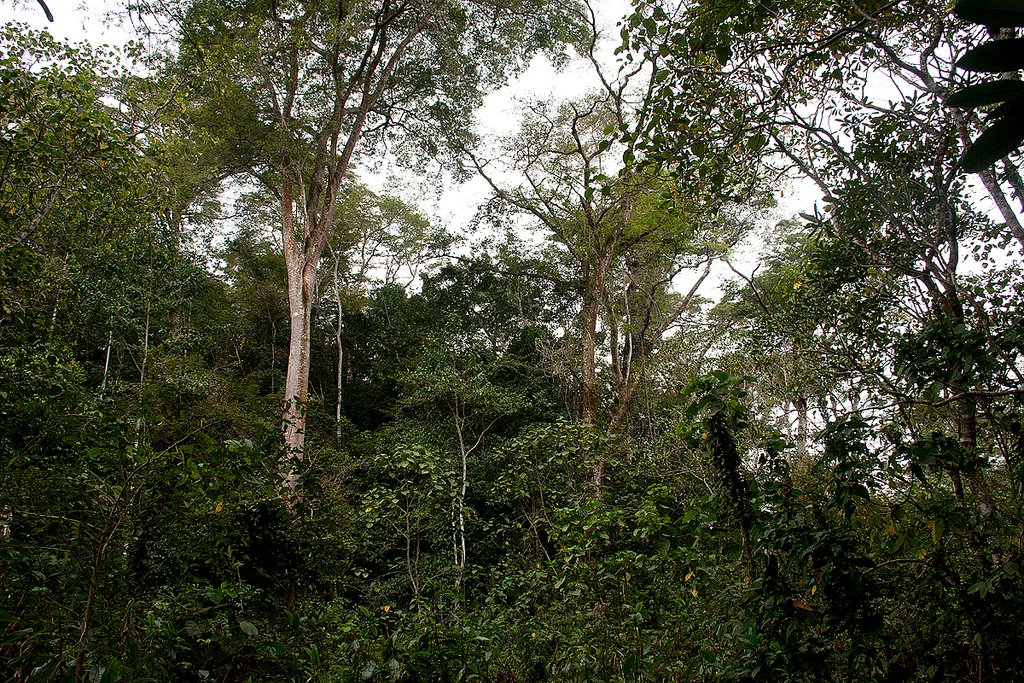
- a view of the forest

- Location within Mozambique
- Coordinates: 19°46′52″S 33°18′08″E
- Area: 53.0 km^{2} (20.5 sq mi)
- Designation: Forest Reserve
- Administrator: National Forestry Directorate (DINAF)

The Moribane Forest Reserve (Portuguese: Reserva Florestal de Moribane) which was proclaimed in 1957, is a natural forest in the buffer zone of the 640 km^{2} Chimanimani National Reserve, and is situated 24 km north of Dombé, in Sussundenga District of central Mozambique. The mid- to low-elevation tropical rain forest covers hilly country, from 400 to 550 metres in elevation, on the eastern verges of the largest southern African forest of this type, altogether 820 km^{2} in extent. It can be reached using public transport from Sussundenga.

== Flora and fauna ==
=== Flora ===
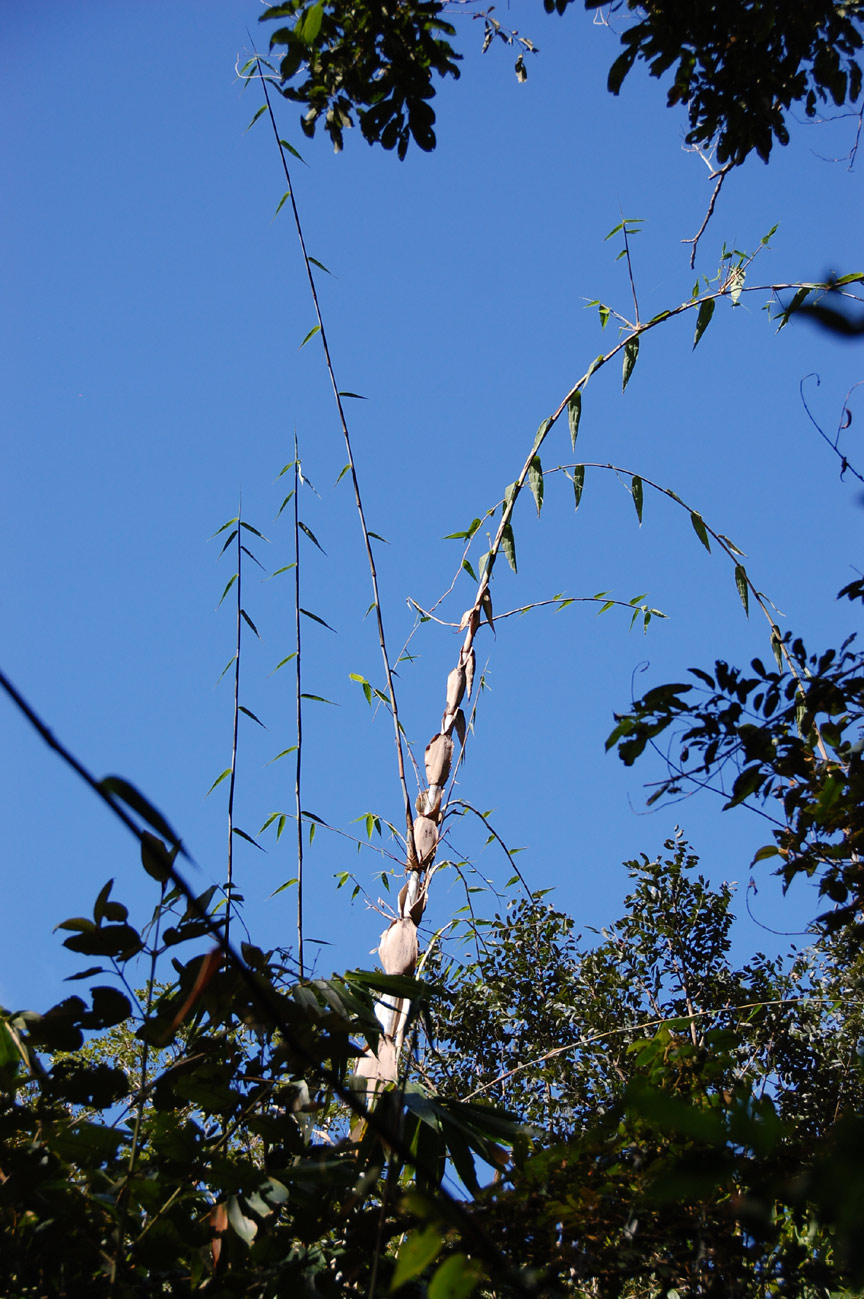
Buchwa bamboo at Tava marsh in Moribane forest

Müller et al. (2005) described two main vegetation types, namely a) moist, evergreen forest dominated by Forest newtonia (Newtonia buchananii), Chirinda stinkwood (Celtis mildbraedii), Forest ordeal tree (Erythrophleum suaveolens), and Panga-panga (Millettia stuhlmannii), and b) transitional forest on the northern verge of the forest, where the predominant species were Winged bersama (Bersama abyssinica), Panga-panga, Two-winged pteleopsis (Pteliopsis myrtifolia), Toad-tree (Tabernaemontana elegans), and Bushveld bitterwood (Xylopia longipetala).

=== Fauna ===
Native mammals include Bush elephant, Bushbuck, Red duiker, Samango monkey, Bushpig and several species of small carnivore.

== History ==
Moribane forest was intensively exploited from the early 20th century onwards, initially for natural rubber derived from Rubber vine, and subsequently for its native timber species, namely Red mahogany, Iroko and Panga-panga. As the 21st century approached, it was damaged by wildfires and shifting agriculture. Despite past overexploitation, the widespread occurrence of saplings of Stem-fruit miraculous-berry, Forest newtonia, Iroko, Panga-panga and Forest ordeal tree, gives reason for hope that it will naturally regenerate. Renamo had a stronghold in the area during the Mozambican Civil War. By the end of the war in 1992 the forest was largely intact, but its Bush elephant population was reduced. While the local people had earlier observed taboos on hunting of elephant, they now had concerns about the recovering elephant population. Chief Mpunga argued that the relation between elephants and humans was spiritual, and people subsequently moved out of the area frequented by the elephants.

== Facilities ==
Ndzou (i.e. Elephant) camp is a joint venture between Eco-Micaia and the local community, which offers guided walks, and a chance of tracking of the shy, forest-living Bush elephants with a local guide. A number of forest trails can be taken from Ndzou camp or Mpunga ranger camp, varying from 4 to 12 km in length. The Mpunga ranger camp, located 3 km to the south of Ndzou, caters only for visitors who bring their own tents and camping gear, and who are self-sufficient in terms of food. Ndzou has thatched rondavels, tents, a three-bedroom house, restaurant and bar.

== Site locations ==
- Moribane forest track 19°44′30″S 33°19′20″E
- Mt Chinhaunguri 19°44′17″S 33°22′38″E
- Mpunga ranger & community camp 19°44′36″S 33°21′22″E
- Mpunga-Chinda-Zinguena communities 19°42′42″S 33°24′33″E
- Ndzou camp 19°44′01″S 33°20′15″E
- Picada da dona Candida track 19°45′45″S 33°18′44″E
- "Ponta de Deus" 19°43′27″S 33°20′19″E
- Tava marsh 19°44′50″S 33°18′43″E
