= Govuro District =

Coordinates: 21.194°S 34.8°E

Govuro
- District
- Govuro District on the map of Mozambique
- Country: Mozambique
- Province: Inhambane
- Capital: Nova Mambone

Area
  - Total: 3,961 km^{2} (1,529 sq mi)

Population (2007 census)
  - Total: 34,809
  - Density: 8.788/km^{2} (22.76/sq mi)

Govuro District is a district of Inhambane Province in south-east Mozambique. Its principal town is Nova Mambone. The district is located at the northeast of the province, and borders with Machanga District of Sofala Province in the north, Inhassoro District in the south, and Mabote District in the west. In the east, the district is bounded by the Indian Ocean. The area of the district is 3,961 square kilometres (1,529 mi^{2}). It has a population of 34,809 as of 2007.

== Geography ==
The Save River makes the northern border of the district and of Inhambane province, separating it from Sofala Province. There are several lakes in the district, the largest being Lake Zimbire and Lake Chimedje.

The climate is tropical arid in the interior of the district and tropical humid at the coast. The annual rainfall at the coast achieves 1,500 millimetres (59 in), mainly falling in February and March.

== History ==
Since 1891, the area was exploited by the Mozambique Company. In 1942, it was included into Govuro Circunscrição, a type of administrative unit used in Portuguese colonies in Africa. The name originates from the Govuro River, one of the minor rivers flowing to the ocean in the south of the district.

In 1986, Mabote District, which was previously a posto belonging to Govuro District, was made a separate district.

== Administrative divisions ==
The district is divided into two postos, Save (three localities) and Mambone (two localities).

== Demographics ==
As of 2005, 42% of the population of the district was younger than 15 years. 33% did speak Portuguese, and Chopi language was the mothertongue for the majority of the population of the district. The Roman Catholic Church was the predomininant church, with 24.7% of the population. 73% were analphabetic, mostly women.

== Economy ==
In 2005, 1% of the households in the district had electricity.

=== Agriculture ===
The main agricultural products are maize, cassava, cowpea, peanuts, sweet potatoes, and rice.

=== Transportation ===
There is a road network in the district which includes the 60 kilometres (37 mi) stretch of the national road EN1, crossing the eastern part of the district. Approximately 200 kilometres (120 mi) of roads in the interior of Govuro District a in a bad state and need rehabilitation.
