= Gondola District =

Coordinates: 19.094°S 33.653°E

Gondola
- District
- Gondola District on the map of Mozambique
- Country: Mozambique
- Province: Manica
- Capital: Gondola

Area
  - Total: 5,739 km^{2} (2,216 sq mi)

Population (2007 census)
  - Total: 262,412
  - Density: 45.72/km^{2} (118.4/sq mi)

Gondola District is a district of Manica Province in western Mozambique. The principal town is Gondola. The area of the district is 5,739 square kilometres (2,216 mi^{2}). It has a population of 262,412 as of 2007.

== Geography ==
The district is located in the east of the province, and borders with Gorongosa District of Sofala Province to the northeast, Nhamatanda District of Sofala Province to the east, Buzi District of Sofala Province to the southeast, Macate District to the south and southwest, Chimoio District to the west, and Vanduzi District to the northwest.

The main river in the district is the Pungwe River, which makes the border with Gorongosa District.

The climate of the district varies with altitude. The lowlands are characterized by relatively low rainfall, between 800 millimetres (31 in) and 1,100 millimetres (43 in). The transition zone has the average rainfall 1,200 millimetres (47 in), and in higher altitude plains it varies between 1,000 millimetres (39 in) and 1,500 millimetres (59 in).

== History ==
The settlement of Gondola was developed as a station on a railroad connecting Beira and Salisbury.

== Demographics ==
As of 2005, 46% of the population of the district was younger than 15 years. 44% did speak Portuguese. The most common mothertongue is Chitwe language. 63% were analphabetic, mostly women.

== Administrative divisions ==
The district is divided into four postos, Amatongas (three localities), Cafumbe (three localities), Gondola (one locality), and Inchope (three localities).

== Economy ==
2% of the households in the district have access to electricity.

=== Agriculture ===
In the district, there are 39,000 farms which have on average 1.5 hectares (0.0058 mi^{2}) of land. The main agricultural products are corn, cassava, cowpea, peanut, sorghum, sweet potato, and rice.

=== Transportation ===
There is a road network in the district which includes 130 kilometres (81 mi) of paved roads and 255 kilometres (158 mi) of unpaved roads. In particular, the national road EN1 (paved) crosses the district north to south, and the national road EN6 (unpaved) connects the coast with Zimbabwe. In 2005, 124 kilometres (77 mi) of roads were closed because of minefields.

A railroad connecting Beira with Machipanda and Zimbabwe crosses the district.
