= Correios de Moçambique =

Company responsible for postal service in Mozambique

- Industry: Postal service
- Founded: 1981
- Defunct: May 25, 2021
- Headquarters: Maputo, Mozambique

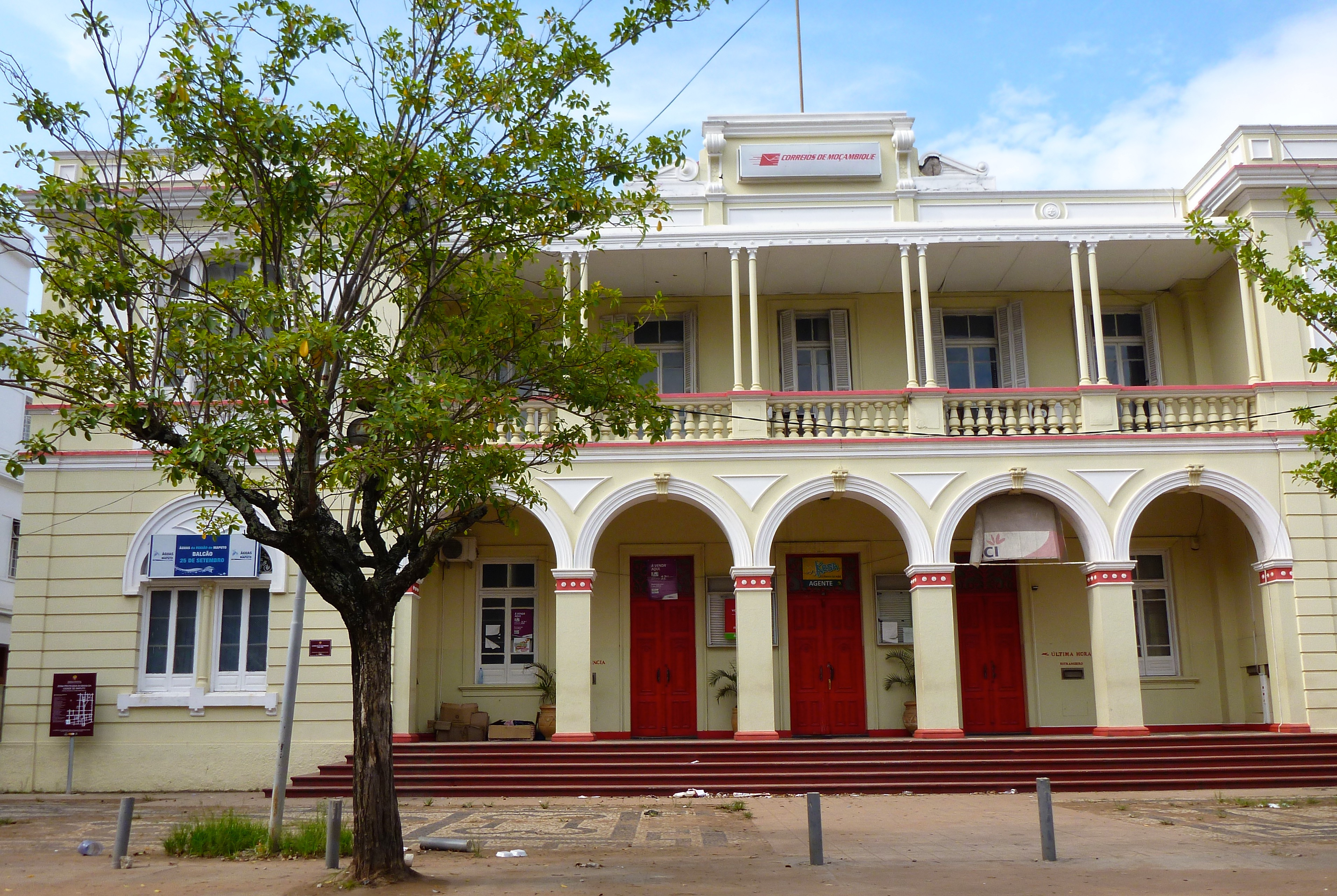
Main post office, Maputo, Mozambique

Correios de Moçambique (Portuguese pronunciation: [kuˈʁɐjuʒ ðɨ musɐ̃ˈbikɨ], lit. 'Post of Mozambique') is the company responsible for postal service in Mozambique. It is headquartered in the colonial-period Maputo Post Office Building on 25 de Setembro Avenue. The company was extinguished by the government in May 2021, and the liquidation process was expected to take 18 months.
