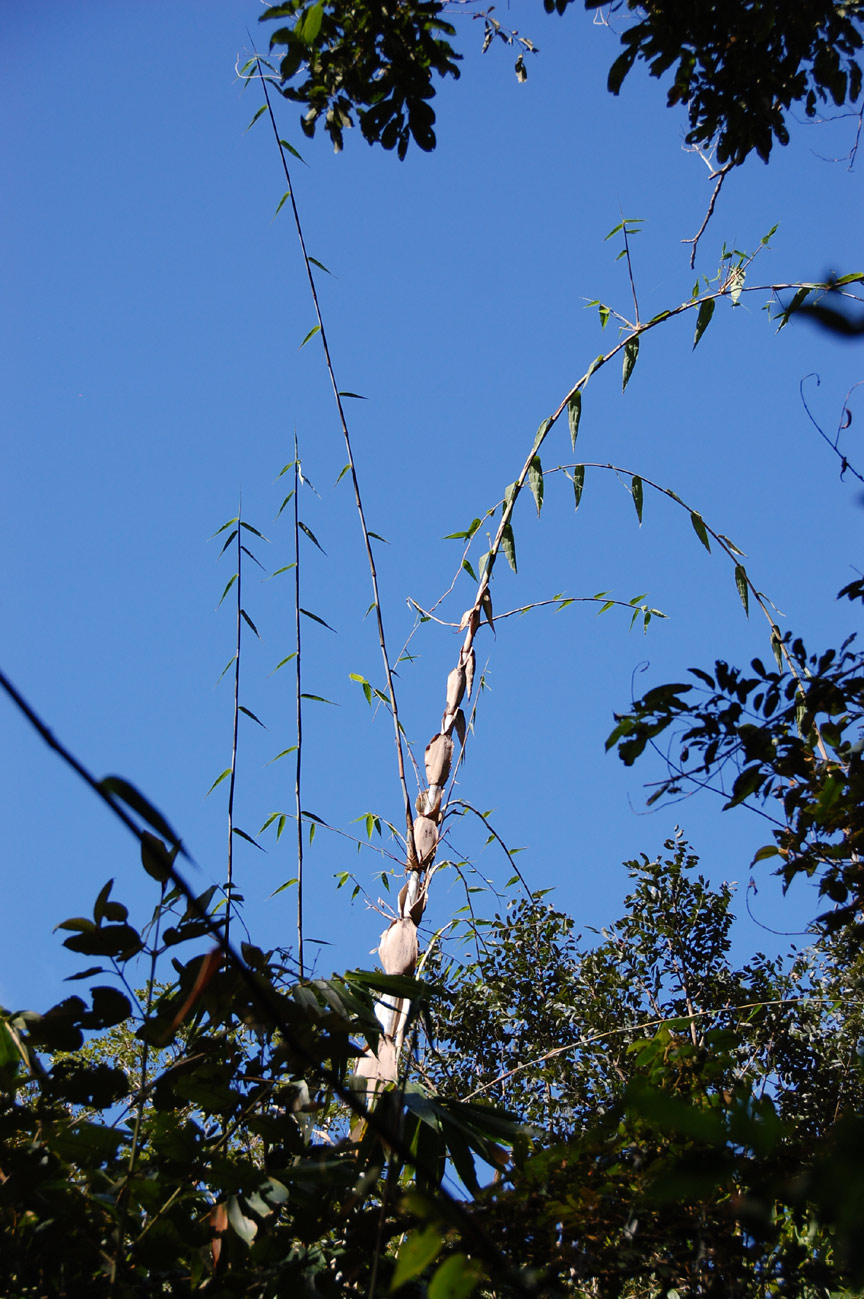
- Oreobambos buchwaldii, Moribane Forest Reserve, Mozambique

Scientific classification
- Kingdom: Plantae
- Clade: Tracheophytes
- Clade: Angiosperms
- Clade: Monocots
- Clade: Commelinids
- Order: Poales
- Family: Poaceae
- Subfamily: Bambusoideae
- Tribe: Bambuseae
- Subtribe: Bambusinae
- Genus: Oreobambos; K.Schum.
- Species: O. buchwaldii

Binomial name
- Oreobambos buchwaldii K.Schum.

= Oreobambos =

Genus of grasses

Oreobambos buchwaldii is the sole representative of Oreobambos, a monotypic African genus of bamboo, most closely related to the large genus Bambusa from tropical Asia and America. It is large and perennial with arching stems up to 20 m. high, growing in isolated clumps, in forest clearings and swamp forest, and along streams, at altitudes of 300–2000 m. It occurs along the tropical east of Africa in eastern DR Congo, Burundi, Kenya, Uganda, Tanzania, Mozambique, Malawi, Zimbabwe and Zambia. This is one of only a handful of indigenous African bamboos.

Lateral branches are dendroid. Sheaths are covered in appressed, dark brown hairs when young. Leaves are 10-35 x 2·5–6 cm., lanceolate to oblong-lanceolate, and obscurely tessellate. Leaf-blade apex is acuminate, while the base is broadly rounded, with a small petiole-like connection to the sheath. Leaf-blades are deciduous at the ligule. Culm-internodes are hollow and 5–10 cm. in diameter. Flowering patterns seem to be erratic, with gregarious flowering recorded in the Shire Highlands of Malawi, and annual flowering in the Usambara Mountains of Tanzania. The plants die after flowering.

The plant is used for matting, baskets, fencing and construction scaffolding. Plants are scattered and apparently not replaced after being cut, a practice which leads to genetic erosion. In some localities over-utilisation has led to its extermination.

== Gallery ==
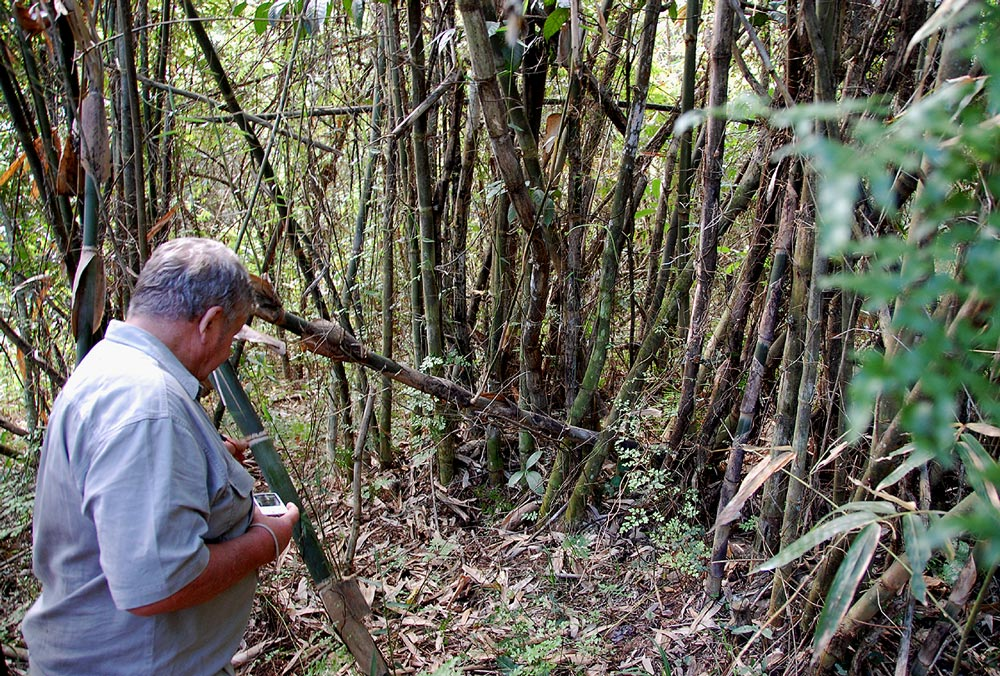

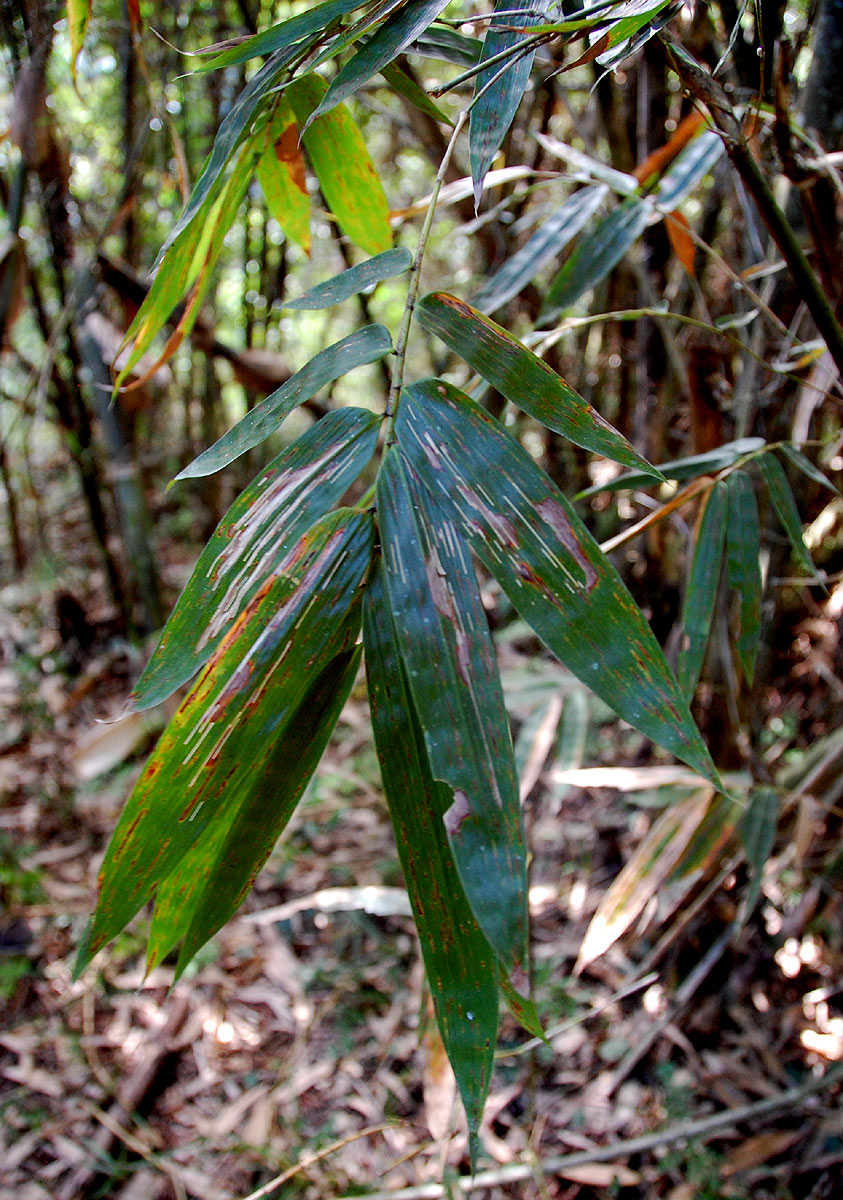

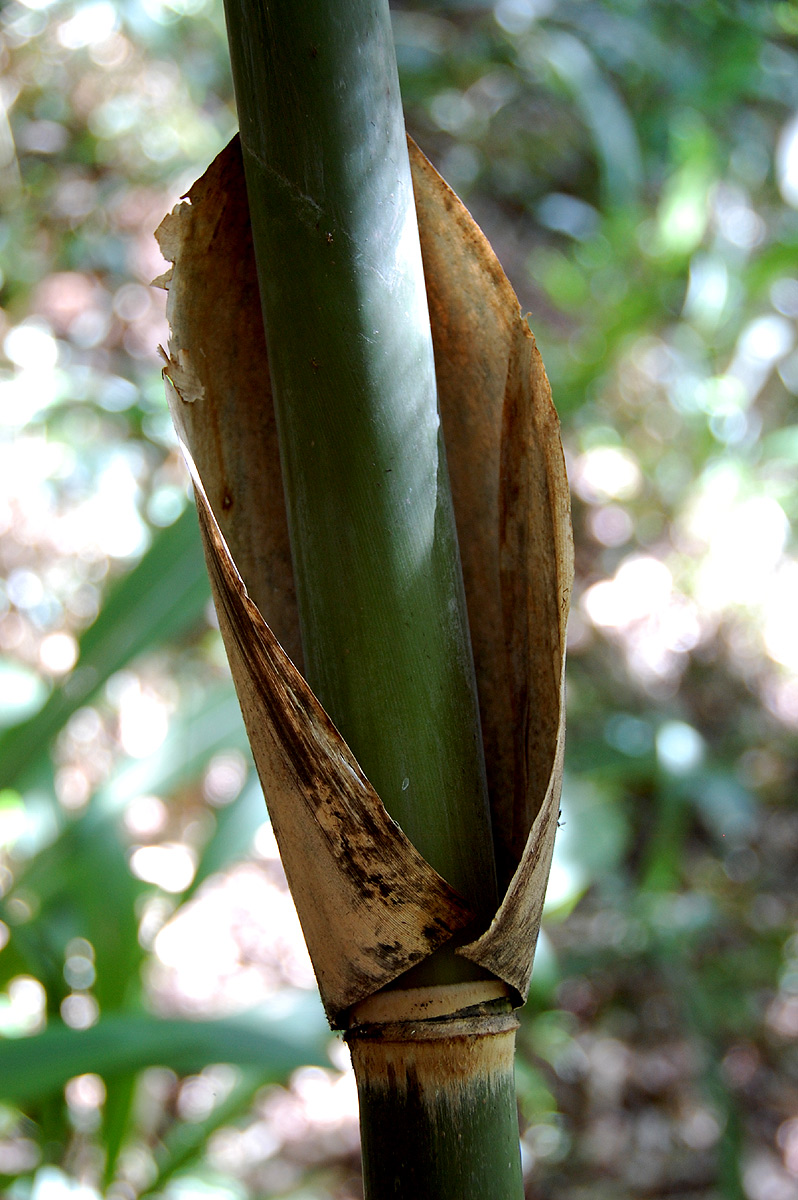

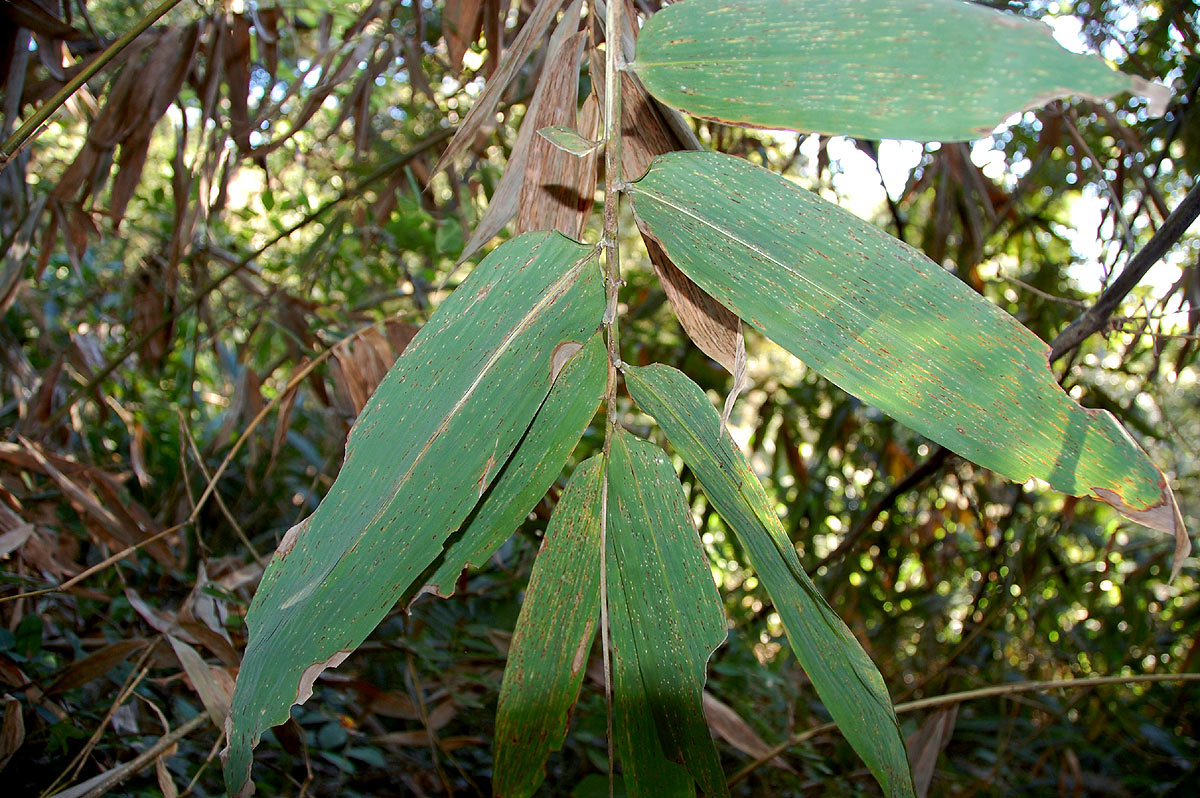
