= Mossurize District =

Coordinates: 20.450022°S 32.821993°E

Mossurize
- District
- Mossurize District on the map of Mozambique
- Country: Mozambique
- Province: Manica
- Capital: Espungabera

Area
  - Total: 5,038 km^{2} (1,945 sq mi)

Population (2007 census)
  - Total: 195,182
  - Density: 38.74/km^{2} (100.3/sq mi)

Mossurize District is a district of Manica Province in western Mozambique. The principal town is Espungabera. The district is located in the south of the province, and borders with Sussundenga District in the north, Chibabava District of Sofala Province in the east, Machaze District in the south, and with Zimbabwe in the west. The area of the district is 5,038 square kilometres (1,945 mi^{2}). It has a population of 195,182 as of 2007.

== Geography ==
The two main rivers in the district are the Mossurize River and the Buzi River. A number of rivers are seasonal and only flow during the rainy season.

According to the Köppen climate classification, the climate of the district is temperate humid, with the annual rainfall being around 1,500 millimetres (59 in).

== History ==
The area was taken over by the Portuguese around 1890.

== Demographics ==
As of 2005, 46% of the population of the district was younger than 15 years. 7% did speak Portuguese. The most common mothertongue is ChiNdau language. 86% were analphabetic, mostly women.

== Administrative divisions ==
The district is divided into three postos, Chiurairue (three localities), Dacata (four localities), and Espungabera (three localities).

== Economy ==
1% of the households in the district have access to electricity.

=== Agriculture ===
In the district, there are 14,000 farms which have on average 1.5 hectares (0.0058 mi^{2}) of land. The main agricultural products are corn, cassava, cowpea, peanut, sorghum, pearl millet, and sweet potato.

=== Transportation ===
There is a road network in the district 235 kilometres (146 mi) long. Most of the roads are in a bad state.
