= Manica, Mozambique =

Manica, Mozambique Macekece
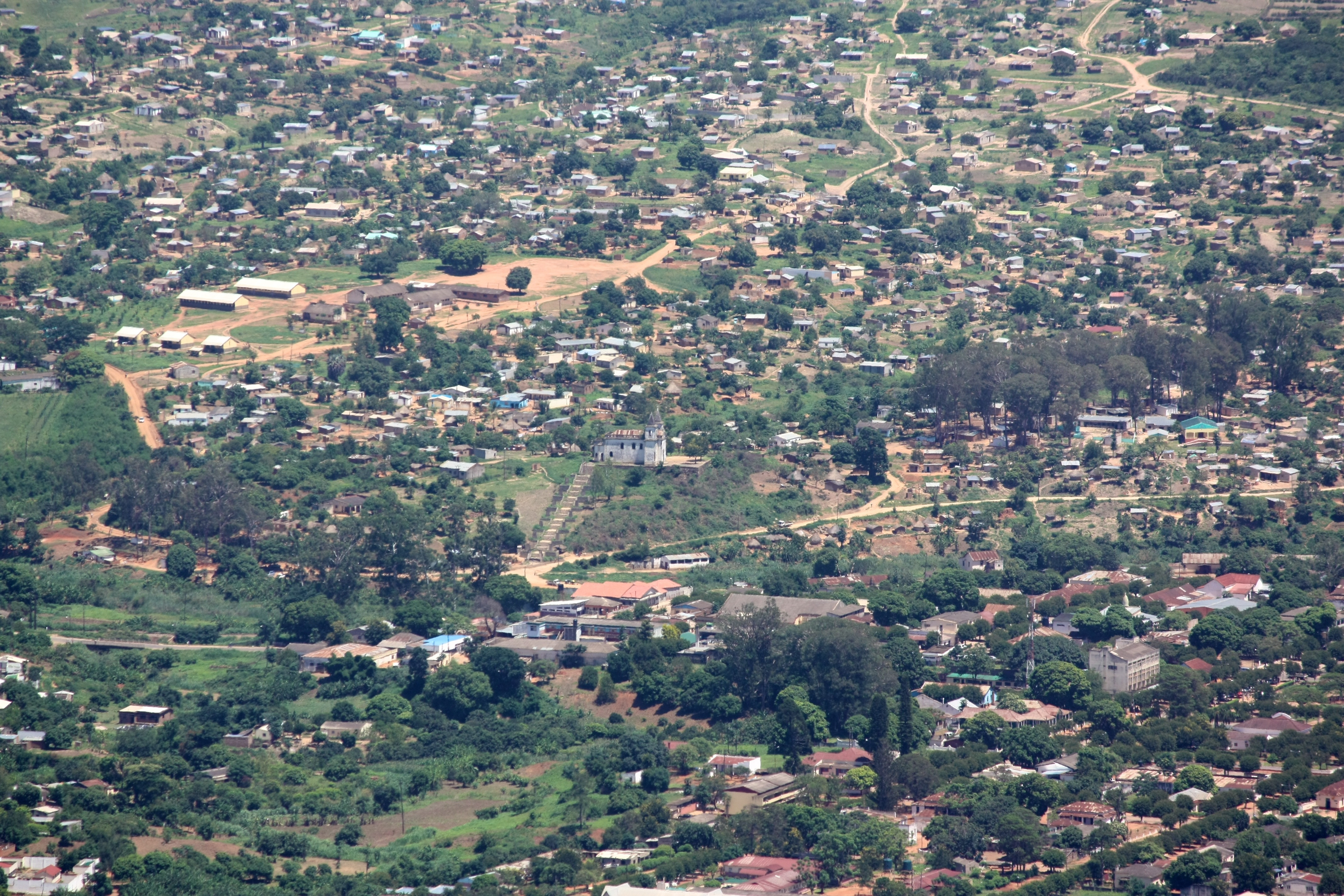
- Aerial view of Manica
- Nickname: Manica é Nice
- Location within Mozambique
- Coordinates: 18°56′04″S 32°52′32″E
- Country: Mozambique
- Provinces: Manica Province
- District: Manica District

Government

Population (2006)
  - Total: 36,124
- Time zone: UTC+2 (CST)
- Climate: Cwa

Manica is a market town in western Mozambique, lying west of Chimoio in the province of Manica. Originally the centre of the Kingdom of Manica, it grew around the gold trade but is now best known for the Chinamapere rock paintings. The Penha Longa Mountains lie north of the town.

== Transport ==
The city has one of the most important railway stations on the Beira–Bulawayo railway.

== See also ==
- Railway stations in Mozambique
