= Machipanda =

Town in Mozambique

- Town
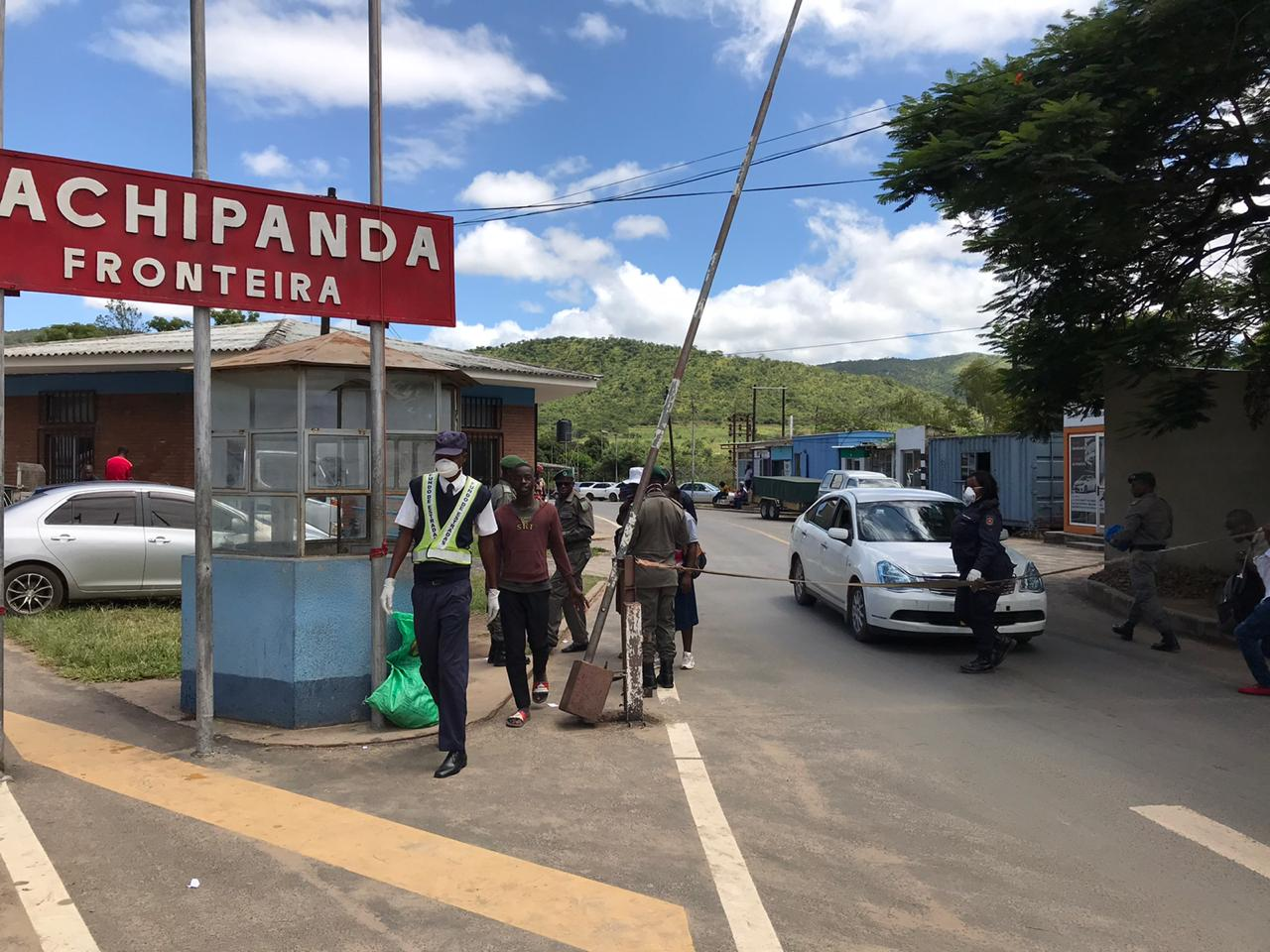
- Machipanda border post, Mozambique

- Location within Mozambique
- Coordinates: 18°59′19″S 32°44′03″E
- Country: Mozambique
- District: Manica
- Province: Manica
- Time zone: UTC+2:00 (CAT)

Machipanda is a town in Manica District, in the middle of Manica Province, Mozambique, near the border with Zimbabwe.

== Transport ==
The city has one of the most important railway stations on the Beira–Bulawayo railway (or Machipanda railway), that connects it to the cities of Beira and Harare, the capital of Zimbabwe.

== See also ==
- Railway stations in Mozambique
