= Maputo Post Office Building =

- Edifício dos Correios de Maputo
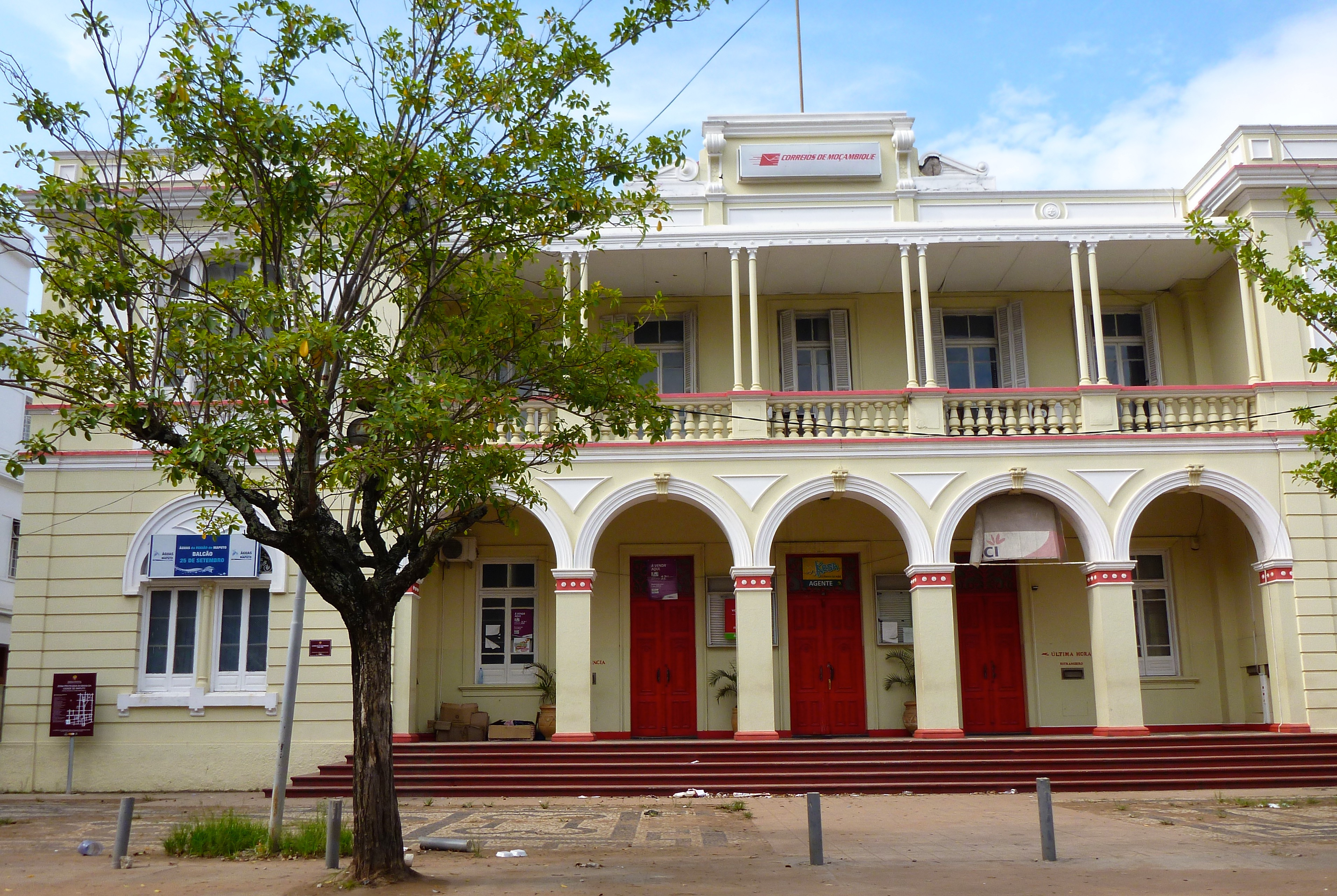
- Maputo Post Office Building
- Interactive map of the Maputo Post Office Building area
- Former names: Edifício dos Correios, Telégrafos e Telefones, CTT, de Lourenço Marques

General information
- Type: Post Office
- Location: Maputo, Mozambique, 25 de Setembro Avenue
- Coordinates: 25°58′23″S 32°34′20″W
- Inaugurated: 1903
- Owner: Correios de Moçambique

Design and construction
- Architect: Carlos Rome Machado

The Maputo Post Office Building (Portuguese: Edifício dos Correios de Maputo) is the headquarters of Correios de Moçambique, the Mozambican postal service. It was built in 1903 by the architect Carlos Rome Machado. The Portuguese State Post (CTT Correios de Portugal), which was responsible for both post and telecommunications in the Portuguese Mozambique, was located in the building until 1975. The building has housed the state postal company since independence. As postal service in Mozambique remains limited, the government waterworks and the Bank BCI use a portion of the customer counter of the building.
