= Beira railway station =

Railway station in Mozambique

Coordinates: 19.8248°S 34.8384°E

Beira railway station Estação Ferroviária da Beira
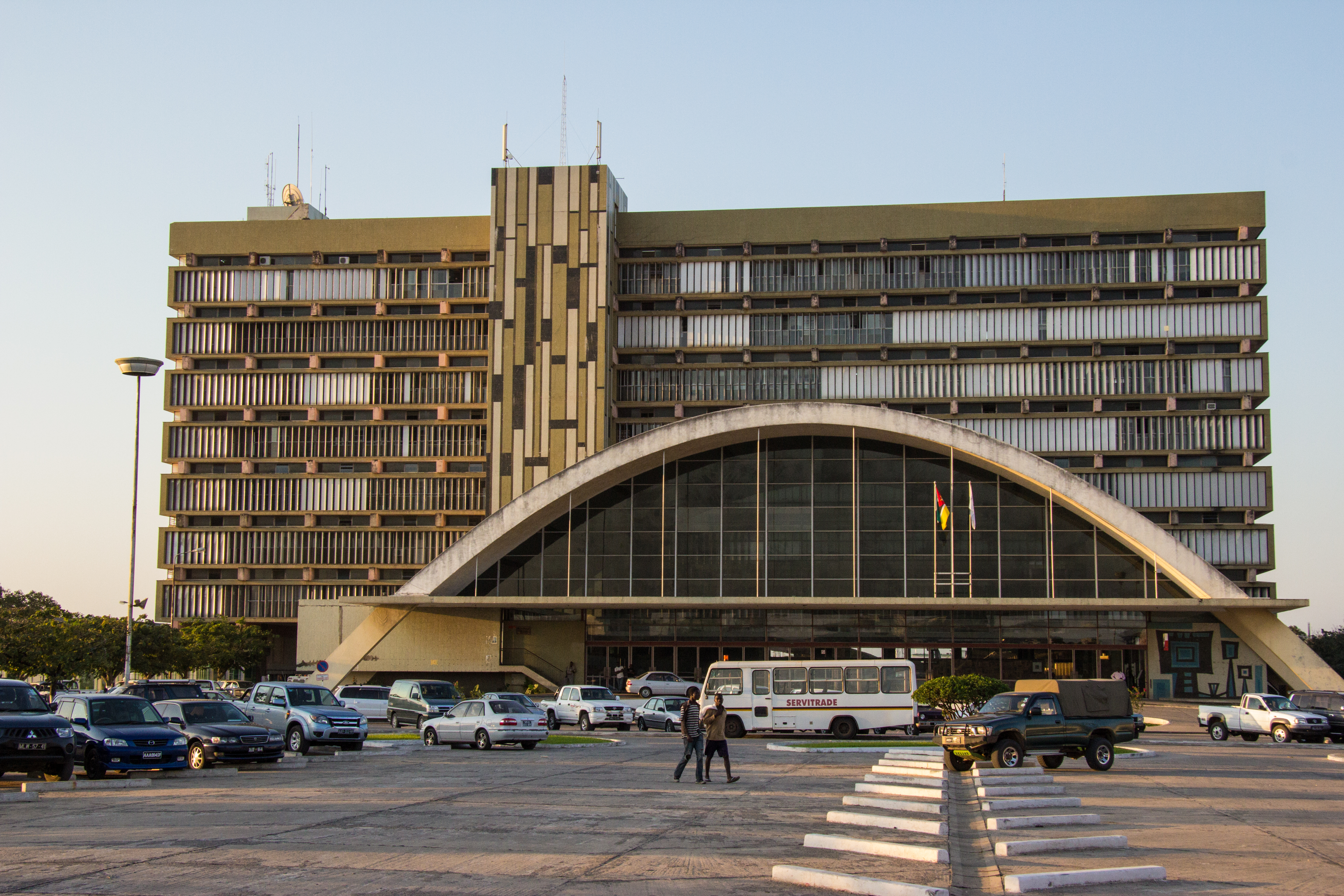
- Front view of the railway station

General information
- Location: Sofala; Mozambique
- System: Railway station
- Lines: Beira–Bulawayo railway; Sena railway
- Tracks: 4

History
- Opened: October 1, 1966
Location

Beira railway station is the principal railway station and important landmark in Beira, Mozambique.

== History ==
The modernist railway station is part of the legacy of Portuguese colonialism in Mozambique. Constructed between 1958 and 1966 by the trio of architects João Garizo de Carmo, Paulo de Melo Sampaio and Francisco José Castro.
