= Machaze District =

Coordinates: 21.195898°S 32.745166°E

Machaze
- District
- Machaze District on the map of Mozambique
- Country: Mozambique
- Province: Manica
- Capital: Machaze

Area
  - Total: 13,189 km^{2} (5,092 sq mi)

Population (2007 census)
  - Total: 104,608
  - Density: 7.9315/km^{2} (20.542/sq mi)

Machaze District is a district of Manica Province in western Mozambique. The principal town is Machaze. The district is located in the south of the province, and borders with Mossurize District in the north, Chibabava District of Sofala Province in the northeast, Machanga District of Sofala Province in the east, Mabote District of Inhambane Province in the south, Massangena District of Gaza Province in the southwest, and with Zimbabwe in the west. The area of the district is 13,189 square kilometres (5,092 mi^{2}). It has a population of 104,608 as of 2007.

== Geography ==
The two main rivers in the district are the Save River, which makes the border of the district with Gaza and Inhambane Provinces, and the Buzí River.

The climate in the west of the district is tropical dry, with the annual rainfall varying between 500 millimetres (20 in) and 800 millimetres (31 in). In the east of the district the climate is tropical wet and dry, with the annual rainfall up to 1,400 millimetres (55 in).

== History ==
In the 15th century, the area was settled by Ndau people who moved out of the Rozwi Empire to fine more fertile lands.

The district was established in 1986.

== Demographics ==
As of 2005, 45% of the population of the district was younger than 15 years. 9% did speak Portuguese. The most common mothertongue is Chitwe language. 86% were analphabetic, mostly women.

== Administrative divisions ==
The district is divided into two postos, Chitobe (five localities, including Machaze) and Save (four localities).

== Economy ==
Less than 1% of the households in the district have access to electricity.

=== Agriculture ===
In the district, there are 19,000 farms which have on average 1.4 hectares (0.0054 mi^{2}) of land. The main agricultural products are corn, cassava, cowpea, peanut, sorghum, pearl millet, and sweet potato.

=== Transportation ===
There is a road network in the district which is 94 kilometres (58 mi) long.
