= Sussundenga District =

Coordinates: 19.413130°S 33.290294°E

Sussundenga
- District
- Sussundenga District on the map of Mozambique
- Country: Mozambique
- Province: Manica
- Capital: Sussundenga

Area
  - Total: 7,057 km^{2} (2,725 sq mi)

Population (2007 census)
  - Total: 129,851
  - Density: 18.40/km^{2} (47.66/sq mi)

Sussundenga District is a district of Manica Province in western Mozambique. The principal town is Sussundenga. The district is located in the center of the province, and borders with Manica District in the north, Gondola District in the northeast, Buzi District of Sofala Province in the east, Chibabava District of Sofala Province in the southeast, Mossurize District in the south, and with Zimbabwe in the west. The area of the district is 7,057 square kilometres (2,725 mi^{2}). It has a population of 129,851 as of 2007.

== Geography ==
The Chimanimani Mountains occupy the western portion of the district, along the border with Zimbabwe. Chimanimani National Park protects the Mozambican portion of the range.

The main rivers in the district are the Revué River, the Munhinga River, the Mussapa River, and the Lucite River, which are tributaries of the Buzi River. A number of rivers are seasonal and only flow during the rainy season.

According to the Köppen climate classification, the climate of the district is tropical wet and dry (Aw), with the annual rainfall being around 1,200 millimetres (47 in).

== Demographics ==
As of 2005, 47% of the population of the district was younger than 15 years. 27% did speak Portuguese. The most common mothertongue is Chitwe language. 73% were analphabetic, mostly women.

== Administrative divisions ==
The district is divided into four postos, Sussundenga (four localities), Dombé (four localities), Muhoa (two localities), and Rotanda (two localities).

== Economy ==
2% of the households in the district have access to electricity.

=== Agriculture ===
In the district, there are 20,000 farms which have on average 1.5 hectares (0.0058 mi^{2}) of land. The main agricultural products are corn, cassava, cowpea, peanut, sorghum, sweet potato, and rice.

=== Transportation ===
There is a road network in the district which includes the national road EN216 connecting Chimoio and Mossuriz. EN216 passes Sussundenga.
