= Chimoio =

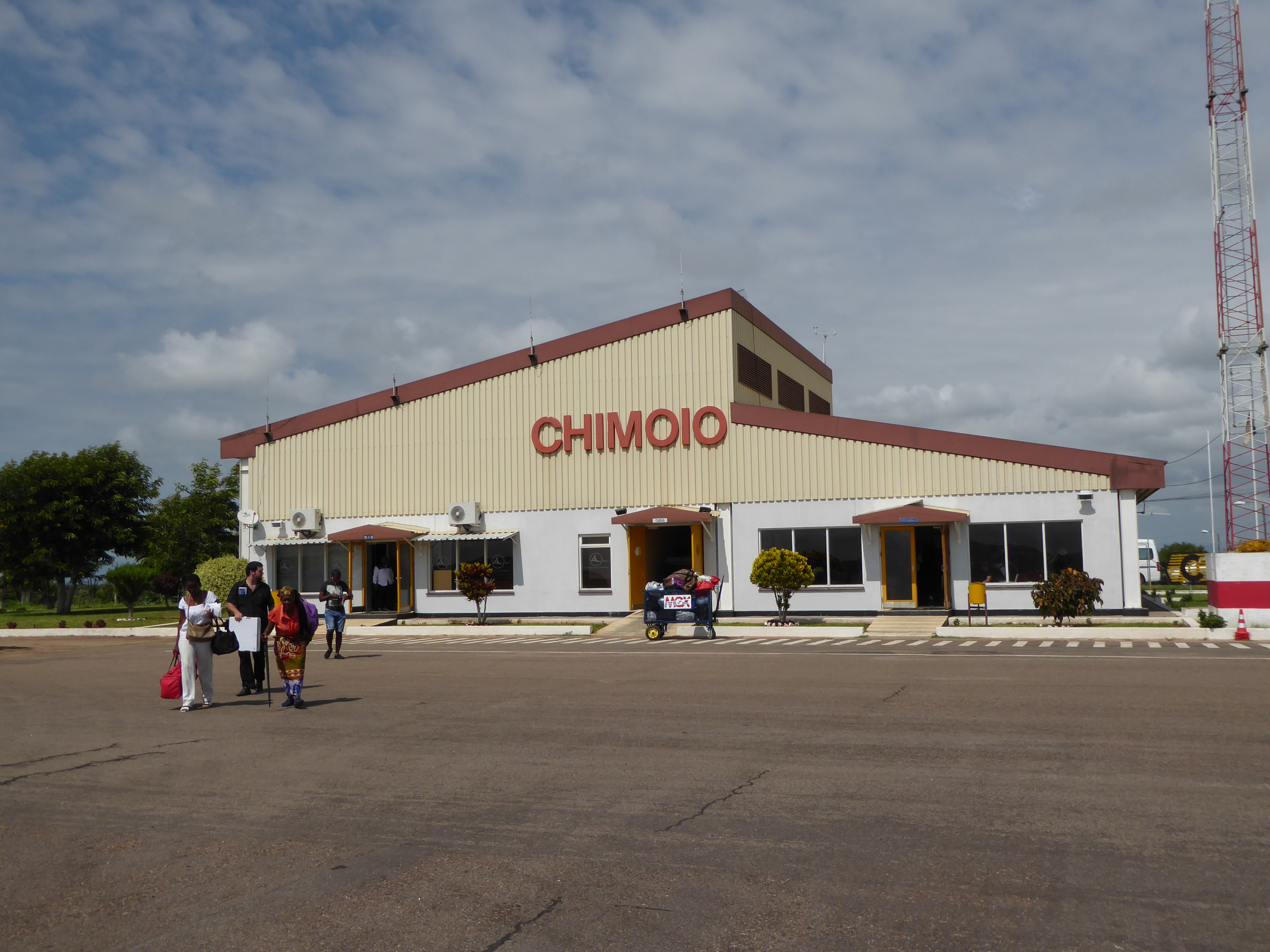
- Chimoio Airport

- Location within Mozambique
- Coordinates: 19°06′59″S 33°29′00″E
- Country: Mozambique
- Provinces: Manica Province
- District: Chimoio District
- City status: 1969

Government
  - Presidente do Conselho Municipal: João Ferreira (Frelimo)
  - Vice-presidente do Conselho Municipal: Salomão Luís Nkuna Chitsondzo

Area
  - Total: 174 km^{2} (67 sq mi)
- Elevation: 664 m (2,178 ft)

Population (2017 census)
  - Total: 372,821
  - Density: 2,140/km^{2} (5,550/sq mi)
- Time zone: UTC+2 (CAT)
- Climate: Cwa

Chimoio [ʃiˈmoju] is the capital of Manica Province in Mozambique. It is the fifth-largest city in Mozambique.

Chimoio's name under Portuguese administration was Vila Pery. Vila Pery developed under Portuguese rule as an important agricultural and textiles centre.

The town lies on the railway line from Beira to Bulawayo, near the Cabeça do Velho rock and the Chimanimani National Park. Located about 95 km from the Zimbabwean border, it has been a major destination for Zimbabwean immigrants looking for employment in Mozambique.

== History and landmarks ==
=== Pre-colonial era ===
The city of Chimoio, capital of Manica Province, lies on the Beira Corridor at an altitude of 750 metres, linking the coast and the interior of the continent. The name Chimoio comes from one of the sons of Ganda, paramount chief of the totemic Moyo clan, who came from M´bire and settled in those lands. Oral history says Chimoio, who was a great hunter, once killed an elephant in the lands of another clan. Chaurumba, their chief, judged Chimoio's behaviour to be a crime and ordered his immediate execution. Paramount Chief Ganda then requested permission for his son to be buried in Chaurumba's land and for one of his relatives to settle close to the grave in order to tend and watch over it. From then on, all descendants of the guardians of Chimoio's tomb, together with the site of the tomb, came to be called Chimoio (which in the local dialect, Citewe, means “Great heart”). The strategic position of that region made it a privileged centre through which products passed from the hinterland to the coast.

=== Arab explorations ===
The Arabs came up the Búzi and Revué rivers heading towards the lands of the Mwenemutapa Empire, in search of gold and other merchandise. To mark their routes, the traders planted Borassus palms, each within sight of the next. In some places, these ancient palm trees can still be spotted. One of the oldest fortresses along this route is believed to be that found on top of the Zembe Mountains, to the south-east of the current city of Chimoio.

=== Portuguese colonization ===
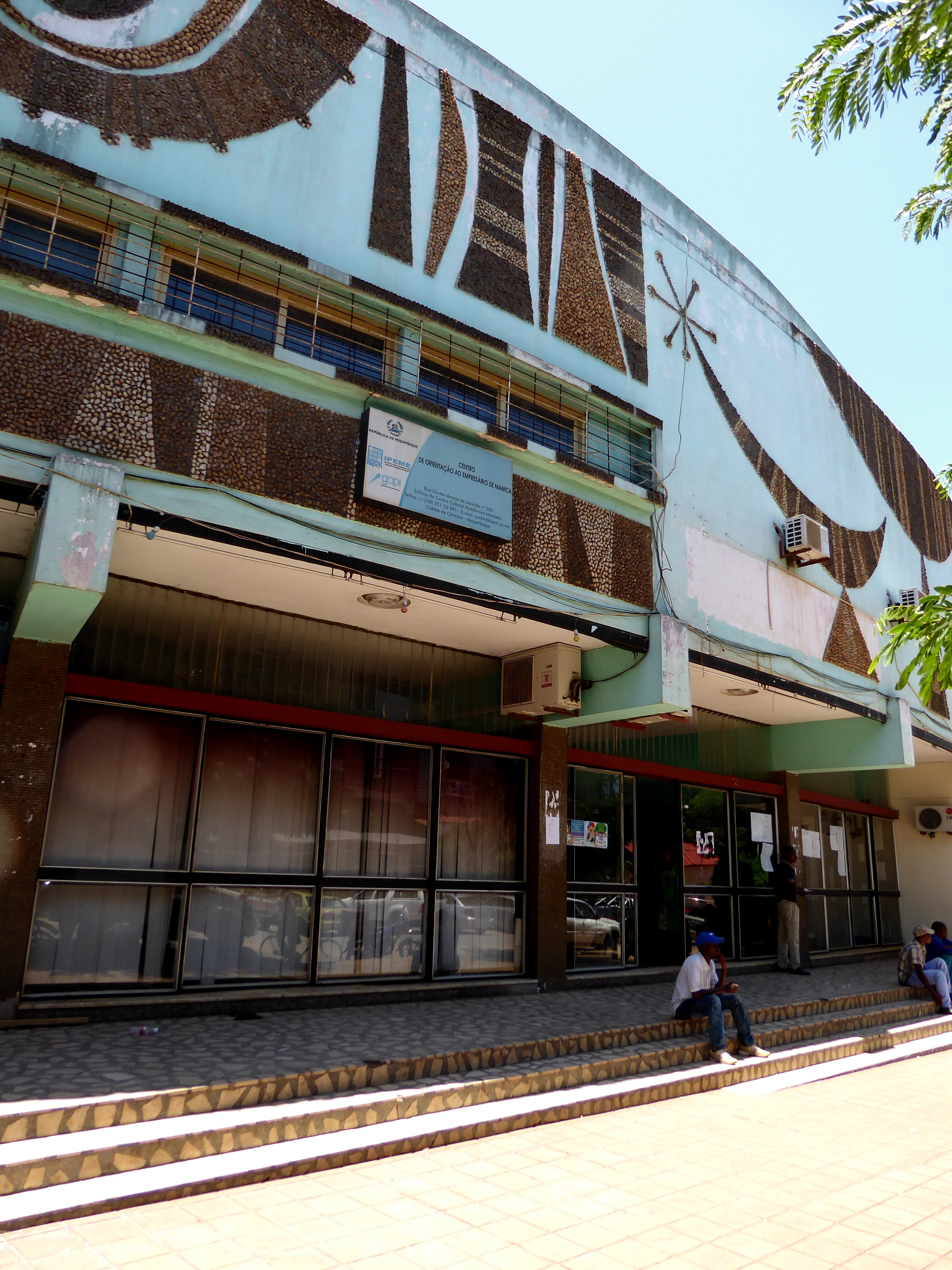
Cinema Montalto in Chimoio

The Portuguese, already well established in the coastal areas of East Africa since the 15th century, also ventured into these interior lands seeking the famous Mwenemutapa Empire and gradually settled there as colonists. This region of Mozambique was then granted by charter to the Mozambique Company, one of whose main objectives was to foster agricultural colonization. Hence, the Company undertook to settle Portuguese and their descendants in its territory. One of the first towns to be created was Vila Barreto. Established on 24 February 1893, close to the current Chimoio city, it arose out of the building of the Beira-Salisbury (Mashonaland) railway. The town was named after the Portuguese capitão-mor (governor/military captain) Francisco Barreto, who, in 1572, commanded the first military expedition to the Mwenemutapa Kingdom. For several years, the railway line terminated at Vila Barreto, which contributed to its impressive growth. The town enjoyed a period of opulence, with its hotels and travellers heading to Manica and Rhodesia or, in the other direction, to Beira. However, by the end of 1897, railway construction work reached the frontier with Rhodesia, interrupting the dynamics that had taken root in Vila Barreto.

In 1899 the Mozambique Company decided to transfer its District Headquarters from Vila Barreto to a settlement named Chimiala, which came to be called Mandigos. This was the name by which the embryo of the current city of Chimoio was known for some time. Mandigos soon began to gain a certain renown, mainly thanks to the abundance of its harvests, which attracted merchants and hotel and social services. Colonization of Manica received its main impetus in 1910 with the arrival of Portuguese Governor João Pery de Lind who set up a number of procedures to further the development of Chimoio. On 17 July 1916, Mandigos was renamed Vila Pery in recognition and honour of Governor João Pery de Lind, whose judicious measures had made Chimoio into one of the biggest and most visible agricultural centres in Mozambique. A few kilometres from the centre of the current city of Chimoio lies the neighbourhood of Soalpo, which bears witness to the agro-industrial development that made the Province of Manica one of the main targets for agriculture investment in the Portuguese colony. This “town close to the city of Chimoio” was built by SOALPO (Sociedade Algodoeira de Portugal, or Portuguese Cotton Company), in 1944. The object of the company was to encourage cotton and textile production.

Vila Pery was raised to the status of city by the Governor-General of Portugal's Overseas Province of Mozambique, Baltazar Rebelo de Sousa, on 17 July 1969, in recognition of the success of its economic and social activities. Vila Pery's football team won its first Mozambican Football Championship title in 1969. The sports club, founded in 1928, contributed to the development of sport and cultural activities. Most of the buildings in the city of Chimoio are milestones of the dynamism in the city's life under Portuguese rule. The Vila Pery Hotel (now the Police social centre), built in 1920, was the first hotel in Vila Pery. The Caldas Xavier Primary School, built in 1948, was the first school in Vila Pery. Nowadays, it houses the Chimoio Municipal Council.

The Montalto Cinema, built in 1969 and abandoned after independence, was so-named because the “monte alto” or high mountain of Mozambique (Mount Binga) is on the Manica plateau. These are but a few of the infra-structures commemorating the city's golden age. Cotton harvesting, silviculture, fruit production (including citrus), and textiles, food and wood industries were the main employers along with services and administration.

In 1974, during the Portuguese Colonial War/Mozambican War of Independence the Mozambican independentist guerrilla group FRELIMO launched attacks in the area of Vila Pery (now Chimoio), which was an important city of Portuguese Mozambique, putting its population in a state of alarm. By this attack, Vila Pery became the first (and only) heavy populated area to be directly hit by FRELIMO during the entire Colonial War. After a military coup in Lisbon, the Carnation Revolution of 1974, the Portuguese authorities offered independence to its African territories, and Mozambique became an independent country.

=== Independent Mozambique ===
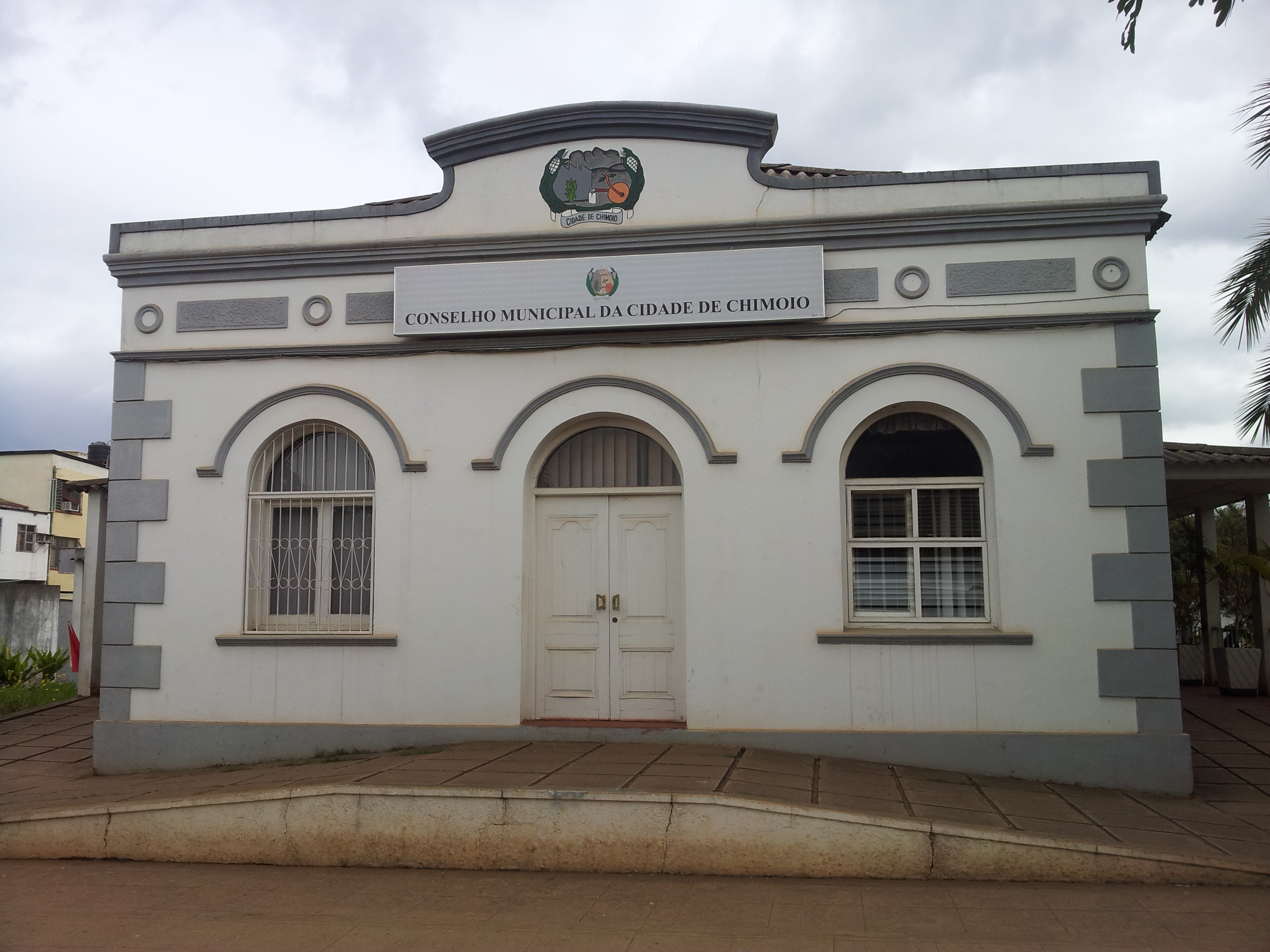
Municipal Council of Chimoio

The change in name from Vila Pery to Chimoio took place on 12 June 1975, during the public rally of the first President of independent Mozambique - Samora Moisés Machel - on his journey from the Rovuma to the Maputo. One of the most visible marks of this period of fighting for independence is the Praça dos Heróis (Heroes’ Square). An impressive mural was painted depicting the various episodes in Mozambican history, with emphasis on becoming independent from Portugal.

After achieving independence, the new country was plagued by several years of civil wars (Mozambican Civil War) and social, political and economic instability. During this period the city of Chimoio deteriorated and suffered heavily from the conflict and lack of development.

A trip to Chimoio city always takes place under the curious gaze of a rocky outcrop with a unique aspect. Nature has carved that rock into the shape of an old man's head. Mount Bêngo, commonly known as Cabeça do Velho (Old Man's Head), is one of the city's main tourist attractions nowadays. The climb to the top of the mountain is relatively simple, and a number of small antelopes or monkeys can sometimes be glimpsed in the forest. The view from the top is interesting, with the whole layout of the city of Chimoio below, together with the surrounding rural landscape. The value of the mountain is not limited to its scenic beauty. At certain times of the year it takes on a spiritual role of great importance to local traditionalistic communities. During the rainy season, the falling water looks like tears running down the face of the “old man”. Local beliefs say that the ancestors are angry and that is why they cry. For these reasons, Mount Bêngo is considered to be a sacred place, where ceremonies invoking the world of the spirit take place.

== Climate ==
Chimoio has a monsoon-influenced humid subtropical climate (Köppen climate classification Cwa).

Climate data for Chimoio, elevation 732 m (2,402 ft), (1951–2023 normals, extremes 1951–2017)
Month	Jan	Feb	Mar	Apr	May	Jun	Jul	Aug	Sep	Oct	Nov	Dec	Year
Record high °C (°F)	35.7 (96.3)	36.0 (96.8)	34.7 (94.5)	35.4 (95.7)	34.2 (93.6)	32.0 (89.6)	31.6 (88.9)	36.5 (97.7)	37.5 (99.5)	40.5 (104.9)	40.5 (104.9)	37.5 (99.5)	40.5 (104.9)
Mean daily maximum °C (°F)	28.4 (83.1)	27.6 (81.7)	27.5 (81.5)	26.1 (79.0)	24.7 (76.5)	23.0 (73.4)	22.8 (73.0)	24.5 (76.1)	27.2 (81.0)	28.5 (83.3)	28.6 (83.5)	28.3 (82.9)	26.4 (79.5)
Mean daily minimum °C (°F)	19.5 (67.1)	19.3 (66.7)	18.6 (65.5)	16.8 (62.2)	14.0 (57.2)	12.0 (53.6)	11.6 (52.9)	12.8 (55.0)	14.8 (58.6)	16.6 (61.9)	18.0 (64.4)	19.0 (66.2)	16.1 (61.0)
Record low °C (°F)	13.6 (56.5)	13.5 (56.3)	10.8 (51.4)	10.1 (50.2)	8.5 (47.3)	0.8 (33.4)	2.0 (35.6)	5.5 (41.9)	5.8 (42.4)	9.5 (49.1)	11.0 (51.8)	12.6 (54.7)	0.8 (33.4)
Average precipitation mm (inches)	202.5 (7.97)	228.2 (8.98)	163.4 (6.43)	54.2 (2.13)	26.4 (1.04)	16.2 (0.64)	18.0 (0.71)	20.7 (0.81)	15.2 (0.60)	43.2 (1.70)	97.3 (3.83)	206.5 (8.13)	1,091.8 (42.98)
Average precipitation days	11.1	11.9	9.5	5.3	3.0	2.8	2.5	2.8	2.0	4.3	7.6	11.1	73.9
Source 1: World Meteorological Organization (precipitation 1961–1990)
Source 2: Starlings Roost Weather

== Demographics ==
Year (census)	Population
1997	171,056
2007	237,497
2017	372,821

== Infrastructure ==
The city has one of the most important railway stations on the Beira–Bulawayo railway.

== See also ==
- Estádio do Textáfrica
- Operation Dingo
- Roman Catholic Diocese of Chimoio
- Wikivoyage:Chimoio
