= Manica Province =

Province of Mozambique

Manica
- Province
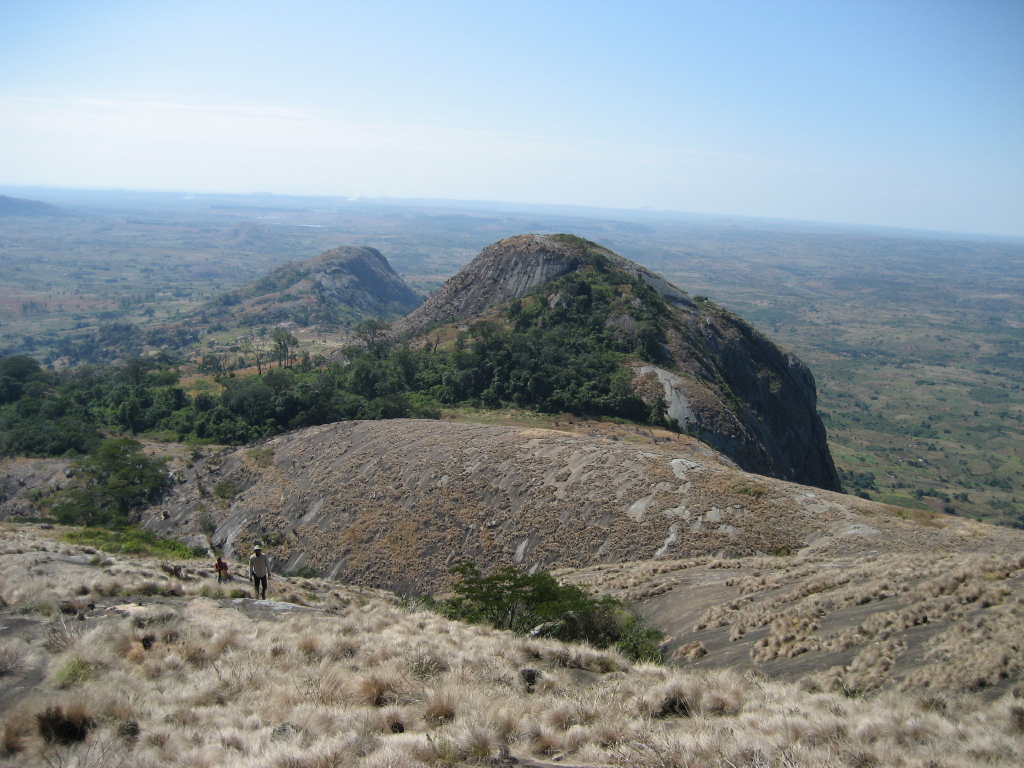
- Looking down from Mount Zembe

- Manica, Province of Mozambique
- Country: Mozambique
- Capital: Chimoio

Government
  - Governor: Francisca Domingos Tomás

Area
  - Total: 62,272 km^{2} (24,043 sq mi)
- Highest elevation: 2,436 m (7,992 ft)

Population (2017 census)
  - Total: 1,945,994
  - Density: 31.250/km^{2} (80.937/sq mi)
- Postal code: 22xx
- Area code: (+258) 251
- HDI (2019): 0.492 low · 3rd of 11
- Website: www.manica.gov.mz

Manica is a province of Mozambique. It has an area of 62,272 km^{2} and a population of 1,945,994 (2017 census). The province is surrounded by Zimbabwe to the west, Tete Province to the northwest, Sofala Province to the east, the Save River to the south, and the Zambezi river to the northeast. Chimoio is the capital of the province. The highest mountain in Mozambique, Mount Binga (2436 m), lies in this province on the border with Zimbabwe. The Manica province is divided into nine districts and 34 administrative regions.

== History ==
The province was located in the old Manica kingdom which probably existed since medieval times and existed until the 19th century. Several larger towns in the region were founded before the Portuguese arrival.

Later it came under Portuguese influence. The territory of the current province was part of the grant of the Mozambique Company, established in 1891. The territory came under direct control under the Portuguese colonial administration in 1942, the "District of Beira" was established, which came to be known as the "District of Manica and Sofala" in 1947.

On 5 August 1970, this district was divided into "District Vila Pery" (the old name of Chimoio) and "District of Sofala". During the period of the transitional government (7 September 1974 to 25 June 1975) the District of Vila Pery was renamed "Province of Vila Pery" and later to its present name.

In 2008, when the incumbent president of Zimbabwe, Robert Mugabe lost the first round of the presidential elections, violence broke out in the country. This forced large number of people to flee to Manica.

The province is headed by a provincial governor who is appointed by the President. Raimundo Diomba was the governor from 2005 to 2007, Maurício Vieira from 2007 to 2010. Ana Comoana is the current provincial governor. Landmines are present in the province and deaths caused by them have been reported.

== Demographics ==
Historical population
Year	Pop.	±% p.a.
1980	641,200	—
1997	1,039,463	+2.88%
2007	1,438,386	+3.30%
2017	1,945,994	+3.07%

== Economy ==
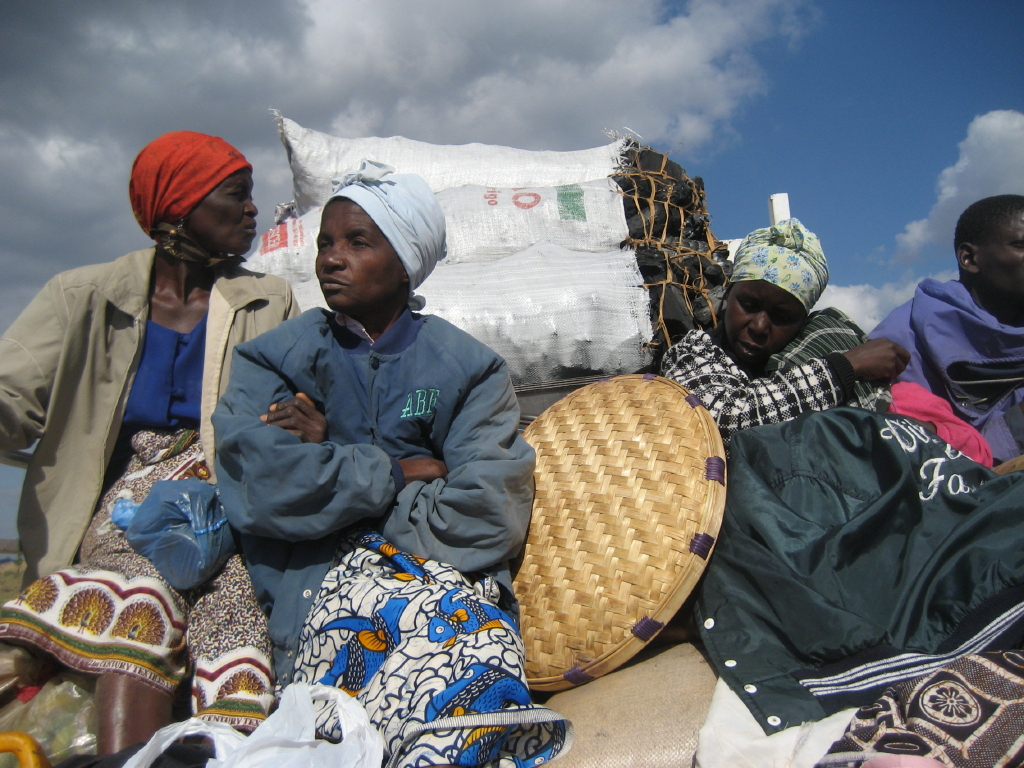
Rural women taking transport to market in Manica.

The inhabitants practice subsistence farming. Main products are maize, cassava and goat meat. Agriculture is favoured by the high rainfall and mild climate. Cashews were once an important export product. Manica Province is rich in terms of gold, copper and base metal. Many farm workers from Zimbabwe have migrated to the province because of the conflicts in their country. The total number of such migrants is disputed and may range from 4,000 to 40,000.

== Districts ==
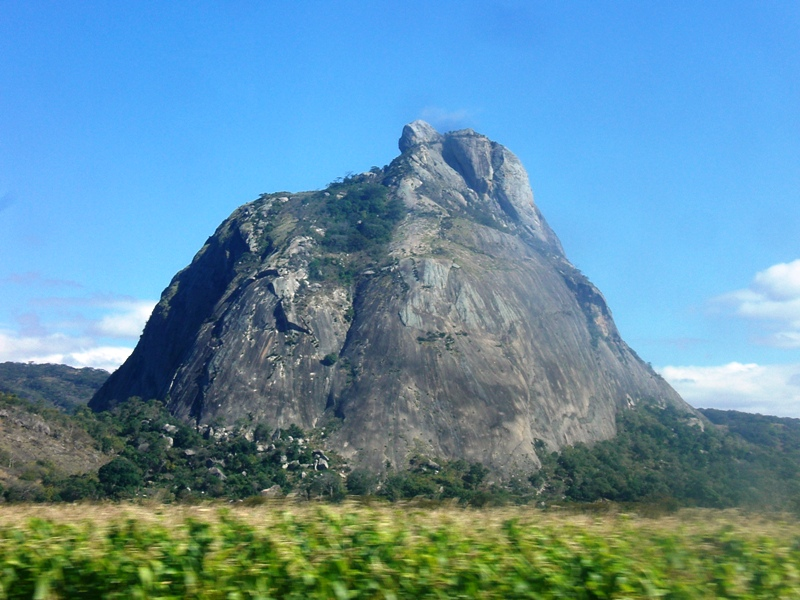
Mount Vanduzi

Manica Province is divided into 12 districts:

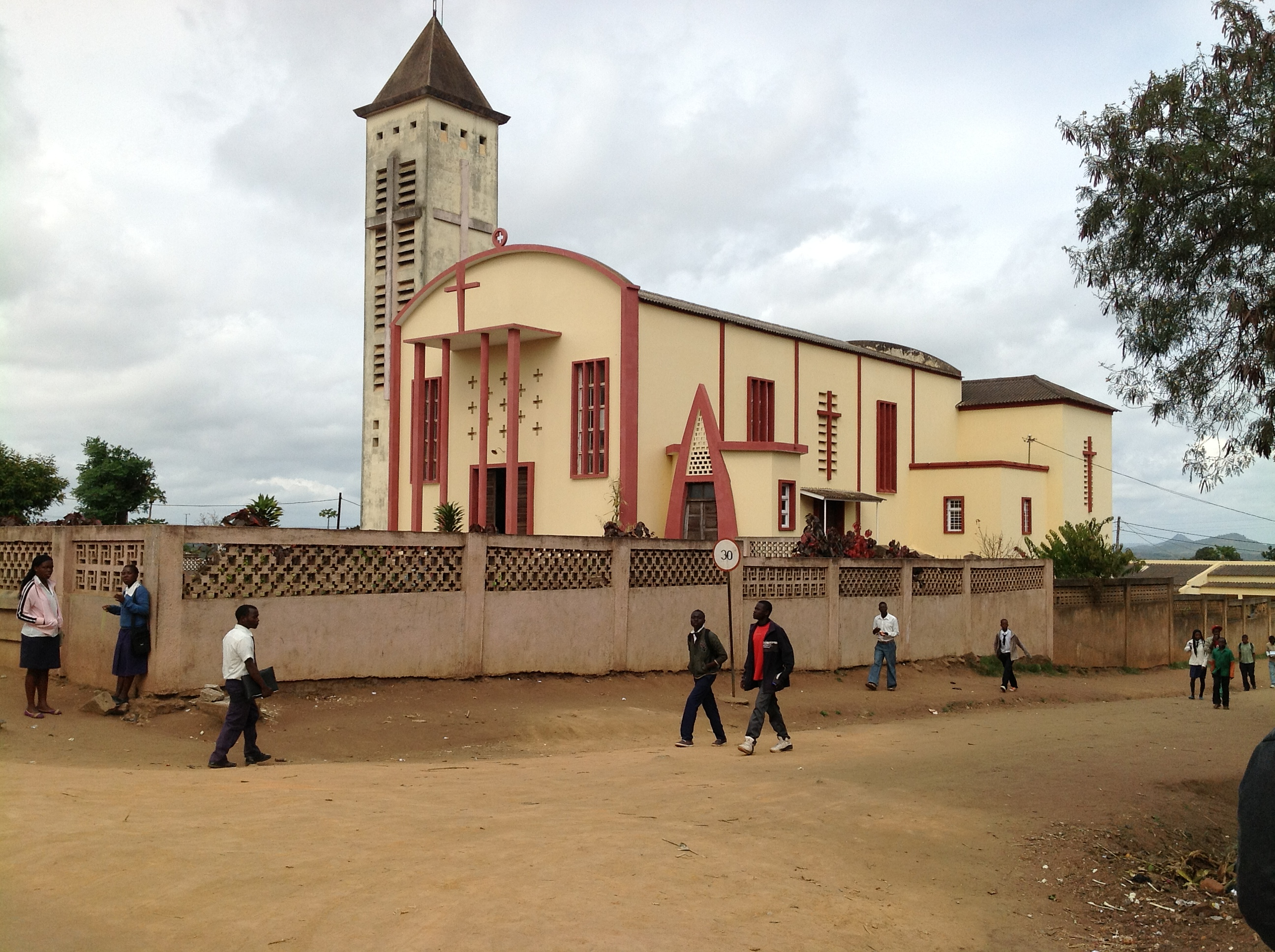
Gondola church, Manica Province

- Báruè District
- Chimoio District
- Gondola District
- Guro District
- Macate District
- Machaze District
- Macossa District
- Manica District
- Mossurize District
- Sussundenga District
- Tambara District
- Vanduzi District

In 2013, the Mozambican government created Chimoio and Macate districts from portions of Gondola District, and Vanduzi District from portions of Manica and Gondola districts.

== Bibliography ==
- Briggs, Philip (2014). Mozambique. Bradt Travel Guides. ISBN 978-1-84162-496-9.
- Derman, Bill; Kaarhus, Randi (2013). In the Shadow of a Conflict. Crisis in Zimbabwe and Its Effects in Mozambique, South Africa and Zambia. African Books Collective. ISBN 978-1-77922-217-6.
- Hilson, G.M. (2006). The Socio-Economic Impacts of Artisanal and Small-Scale Mining in Developing Countries. CRC Press. ISBN 978-0-203-97128-4.
- Republic of Mozambique: Review of the Economic and Social Plan for 2007. International Monetary Fund. p. 75. GGKEY:5XJ8WCSL5BH.
