= Deolinda Guezimane =

- Born: March 6, 1945; Búzi

Deolinda Guezimane (born March 6, 1945) is a Mozambican independence fighter and politician. She was the first Secretary General of the Organization of Mozambican Women (OMM).

She was born Deolinda Simango in Búzi, Sofala Province in Mozambique. Raised by her grandmother, she was educated in Chicumbane in Gaza Province.

In 1965, she went to Tanzania and joined FRELIMO, the Mozambican independence movement. FRELIMO had good relations with the Soviet Union and Guezimane attended a Komsomol there from 1966 to 1967. She worked as a teacher in Tunduru in Tanzania. She became a leader in the independence movement and early Mozambican government, first with the League of Mozambican Women, then becoming the founding Secretary General of the OMM in 1973. In 1976, she and her coordinating council were abruptly and controversially fired from the OMM by Samora Machel.

At FRELIMO's sixth party congress in 1991, she became the first woman to serve in the Political Bureau of the Central Committee of FRELIMO.

== Bibliography ==
- Guezimane, D. (2012). “ Os motivos da criação da organização da mulher Moçambicana”, Siliya, Zimba e Temba (ed.), Simpósio 50 anos da FRELIMO 1962–2012. Fontes para a nossa História,: Movimento Editora.
