= Nhamatanda =

Town in Sofala Province, Mozambique

- Town
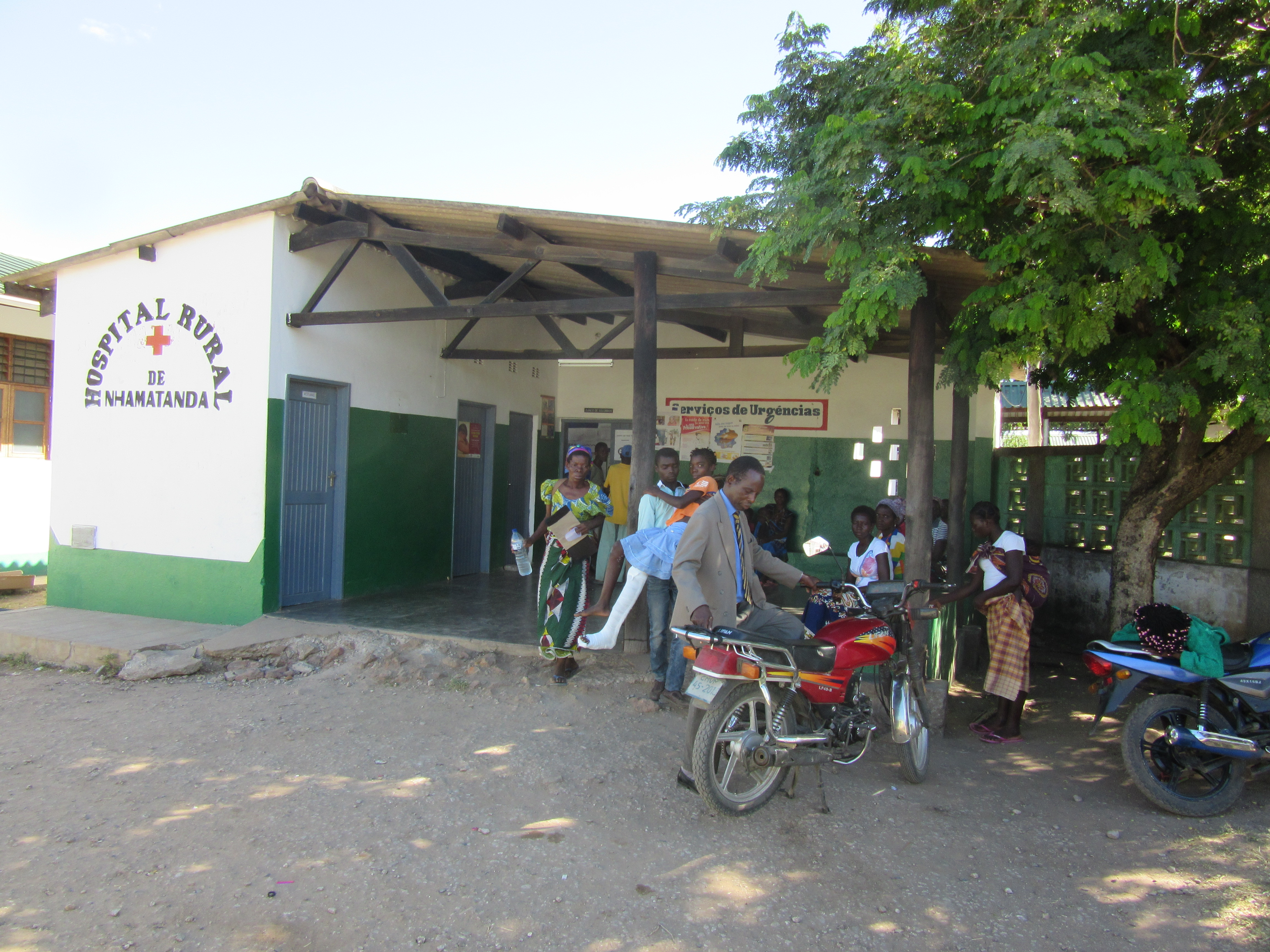
- Rural hospital of Nhamatanda

- Location within Mozambique
- Coordinates: 19°16′S 34°13′E
- Country: Mozambique
- Province: Sofala
- District: Nhamatanda

Nhamatanda is a town in the Sofala Province of Mozambique. It is the administrative center of Nhamatanda District. It lies along the Beira Corridor between Harare in Zimbabwe and Beira, Mozambique's second-largest city. It was largely destroyed by Cyclone Idai in March 2019.

== Name ==
Nhamatanda has had many names. Early in its history, it was known as "Bambu Crick". In the local dialect of Chisena, this means "Mr. Crick" - a reference to a British landowner in the area. English-speakers, however, referred to the place as "Bamboo Creek", a reference to a small river near the town. Which name came first is unknown, and many residents of the area refer variously to these different stories.

Nova Fontesvila, the name given to the same place by the Portuguese (who inhabited the area along with the British), was founded in 1898 and named after Fontes Pereira de Melo, a Portuguese marquis. The names of Nova Fontesvila and Bamboo Crick existed simultaneously.

In the 1920s, the town of Nova Fontesvila was officially renamed "Vila Machado", a reference to the Portuguese engineer responsible for building the railroad from Beira to Harare. Machado is also the Portuguese word for "axe", and many Mozambican residents of the area refer to the fact that the railroad was built through a large grove of trees, all of which needed to be cut down by black African workers.

The current name, Nhamatanda, was given in 1975 at Mozambican independence. It derives from the name of the river near the town and through the district. In Chisena, the word Nhamatanda may be derived from words meaning "large logs", It is said that the river has been strong enough, before current dams were built, to pass large logs down its length.
