= Destacamento Feminino =

The Destacamento Feminino (the Women's Detachment or Female Detachment) was a group of female guerrillas from the Front for the Liberation of Mozambique (FRELIMO), involved in the struggle for independence in Mozambique, founded on March 4, 1967. The emergence of this group was important for the armed struggle and for redefining relations between men and women in Mozambique, and was a precursor to the creation of the Organization of Mozambican Women.

== History ==
The Destacamento Feminino was officially founded on March 4, 1967; although it began informally in October 1966, when FRELIMO's Central Committee began admitting women to its army. It was made up of women from the battlefronts in northern Mozambique, with the mission of institutionalizing and formalizing military training and participation in combat. This admission came after a group of peasant women asking FRELIMO, in 1965, to train them militarily so that they could defend the populations they were responsible for.

The group present at the foundation was made up of 25 young women, of peasant origin, from the provinces of Cabo Delgado and Niassa. In 1967, the group took part in military training at the Military Political Preparation Center in Nachingwea, Tanzania. This group of young founders included Paulina Mateus N'Kunda, Filomena Likune, Filomena Nashake, Marina Pachinauapa and Mónica Chitupila.

According to N'Kunda, the participation of women in the liberation struggle, which existed before 1966, was kept secret by the Front for the Liberation of Mozambique (FRELIMO), so they had to present male names and continued to do so in the early days of the Destacamento Feminino. Despite the decision of the Central Committee of FRELIMO, in 1966, to allow women to participate in political-military training, their presence in the fight against colonialism was not unanimous among the members of the Board, with some claiming that it clashed with the tradition of a woman's place being in the kitchen. The existence of this group of female guerrillas led FRELIMO to reflect on the role of women in the struggle and the progress needed to fully integrate them as combatants.

The founding squad was made up of: Filomena Nashake, as Chief; Marina Pachinauapa, as Political Commissar and Head of the 2nd Section; and Paulina Mateus N'Kunda as Secretary and Head of the 1st Section. The pioneers of Destacamento Feminino were between 15 and 20 years old.

According to Jacqueline Maia dos Santos, the emergence of Destacamento Feminino was important for the armed struggle, as well as for redefining relations between men and women in Mozambique, and was a precursor to the creation of the Mozambican Women's Organization. This organization, unlike Destacamento Feminino, was aimed at women who were not guerrillas, with the main mission of making women aware of the domination imposed by Portuguese colonialism.

== See also ==
- Josina Machel
