= Nova Lusitania =

Nova Lusitania may refer to:

- Nova Lusitânia, Mozambique, currently known as Búzi
- Nova Lusitânia, the original name for the Captaincy of Pernambuco in colonial Brazil

== See also ==
- Nova Luzitânia, a town in the Brazilian state of São Paulo (unrelated to the Captaincy of Pernambuco)
