= Buzi District =

Coordinates: 19.892°S 34.607°E

Buzi
- District
- Buzi District on the map of Mozambique
- Country: Mozambique
- Province: Sofala
- Capital: Búzi

Area
  - Total: 7,329 km^{2} (2,830 sq mi)

Population (2007 census)
  - Total: 159,614
  - Density: 21.78/km^{2} (56.41/sq mi)

Buzi District is a district of Sofala Province in Mozambique. The principal town is Búzi. The district is located in the southeast of the province, and borders with Nhamatanda District in the north, Dondo District in the northeast, Machanga District in the south, Chibabava District in the southwest, Sussundenga District of Manica Province in the west, and with Gondola District of Manica Province in the northwest. The area of the district is 7,329 square kilometres (2,830 mi^{2}). It has a population of 159,614 as of 2007.

== Geography ==
The principle river of the district is the Buzi River, which has its mouth inside the district.

According to the Köppen climate classification, the district is in two climate zones, tropical wet and dry or savanna (aw) and sub-tropical humid (cw).

== History ==
Since the 15th century, the area belonged to the Kingdom of Mutapa and was periodically subject to civil wars. In the 19th century, the interior was part of the Rozwi Empire. The coast was controlled by Arabs, and since the 16th century by the Portuguese. Nova Sofala was founded in 1505. Buzi District was established in 1931, its administrative center was initially located in Nova Sofala.

== Demographics ==
As of 2005, 45% of the population of the district was younger than 15 years. 29% did speak Portuguese. The most common mothertongue is Cindau. 75% were analphabetic, mostly women.

== Administrative divisions ==
The district is divided into three postos, Búzi (three localities), Estaquinha (two localities), and Sofala (two localities, including Nova Sofala).

== Economy ==
1% of the households in the district have access to electricity.

=== Agriculture ===
In the district, there are 27,000 farms which have on average 1.3 hectares (0.0050 mi^{2}) of land. The main agricultural products are corn, cassava, cowpea, peanut, sweet potato, and rice.

=== Transportation ===
There is a road network in the district which is 330 kilometres (210 mi) long.
