= Dondo District =

Coordinates: 19°37′S 34°45′E

Dondo
- District
- Dondo District on the map of Mozambique
- Country: Mozambique
- Province: Sofala
- Capital: Dondo

Area
  - Total: 2,306 km^{2} (890 sq mi)

Population (2007 census)
  - Total: 142,387
  - Density: 61.75/km^{2} (159.9/sq mi)

Dondo District is a district of Sofala Province in Mozambique. The principal town is Dondo. The district is located in the center of the province, and borders with Muanza District in the north, the city of Beira and Buzi District in the south, and with Nhamatanda District in the west. In the east, the district is limited by the Indian Ocean. The area of the district is 2,306 square kilometres (890 mi^{2}). It has a population of 142,387 as of 2007.

== Geography ==
According to the Köppen climate classification, the climate of the district is transitional from tropical rainforest to hot steppe. The rainfall varies between 1,000 millimetres (39 in) and 1,459 millimetres (57.4 in).

There is a coastal forest, the Dondo forest (19°36'S 34°44'E), near the main road (EN 6) to Zimbabwe and 25 miles north of Beira with a species rich flora and fauna, including the eastern green-backed honeyguide, white-chested alethe, Böhm's spinetail, black-headed apalis, speckle-throated woodpecker, red-winged prinia, east coast akalat, violet-backed sunbird and olive-headed weaver.

== History ==
The Beira Railway, constructed in the end of the 19th century by the Beira Railroad Corporation, a subsidiary of the British South Africa Company, between Beira and Harare, had a considerable impact on the development of the district.

== Demographics ==
As of 2005, 42% of the population of the district was younger than 15 years. 65% did speak Portuguese. The most common mother tongue is Cindau. 57% of the population of the age above five had school education, most of them at primary school level.

== Administrative divisions ==
The district is divided into two postos, Dondo (two localities) and Mafambisse (two localities).

== Economy ==
9% of the households in the district have access to electricity.

=== Agriculture ===
In the district, there are 26,000 farms which have on average 0.8 hectares (0.0031 mi^{2}) of land. The main agricultural products are corn, cassava, cowpea, peanut, sweet potato, and rice.

=== Transportation ===
Dondo is an important railway node and is connected by railways with Beira, Manica and Tete Provinces, as well as Zimbabwe, Malawi, Zambia, Botswana, and the Democratic Republic of the Congo. There is a road network in the district 156 kilometres (97 mi) long.
