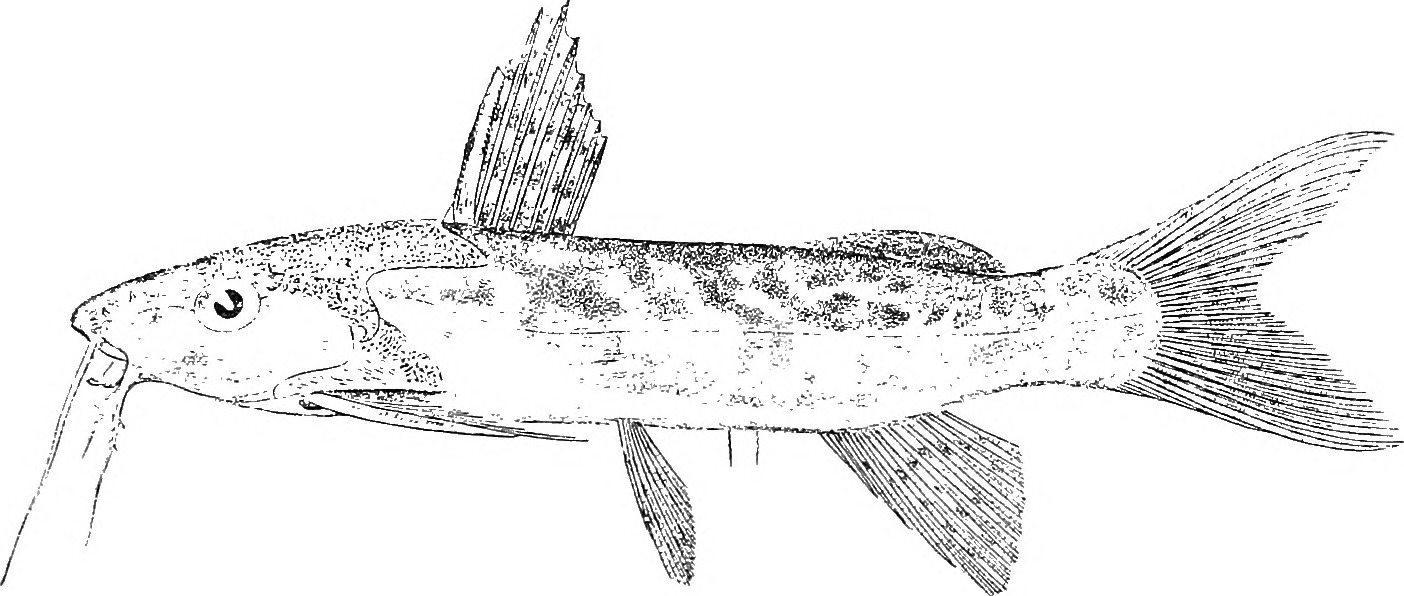

Conservation status
- Least Concern (IUCN 3.1)

Scientific classification
- Kingdom: Animalia
- Phylum: Chordata
- Class: Actinopterygii
- Order: Siluriformes
- Family: Mochokidae
- Genus: Synodontis
- Species: S. nebulosus

Binomial name
- Synodontis nebulosus Peters, 1852

= Synodontis nebulosus =

Species of fish

Synodontis nebulosus, known as the cloudy squeaker, or clouded squeaker, is a species of upside-down catfish that is native to the lower Zambezi River basin of Malawi, Mozambique, Zambia and Zimbabwe. It was first described by German naturalist and explorer Wilhelm Peters in 1852, from a specimen collected in the Zambezi River at Tete, Mozambique. The species name nebulosus is derived from the Latin word nebulosus, meaning "foggy", "cloudy", or "full of mist".

== Description ==
Like all members of the genus Synodontis, S. nebulosus has a strong, bony head capsule that extends back as far as the first spine of the dorsal fin. The head contains a distinct narrow, bony, external protrusion called a humeral process. The shape and size of the humeral process help to identify the species. In S. nebulosus, the humeral process is as broad as it is wide, with a pointed back end.

The fish has three pairs of barbels. The maxillary barbels are on located on the upper jaw, and two pairs of mandibular barbels are on the lower jaw. The maxillary barbel is long and straight without any branches, without a membrane at the base. It extends to a length a little shorter than the head. The outer pair of mandibular barbels is about twice the length of the inner pair, and both pairs have short, simple branches, with secondary branches on the inner pair.

The front edges of the dorsal fins and the pectoral fins of Syntontis species are hardened into stiff spines. In S. nebulosus, the spine of the dorsal fin is slightly shorter than the head, smooth in the front and serrated on the back. The remaining portion of the dorsal fin is made up of seven branching rays. The spine of the pectoral fin about the same size as the dorsal spine, and serrated on both sides. The adipose fin is 5 times as long as it is deep. The anal fin contains four unbranched and eight-branched rays. The tail, or caudal fin, is deeply forked.

All members of Syndontis have a structure called a premaxillary toothpad, which is located on the very front of the upper jaw of the mouth. This structure contains several rows of short, chisel-shaped teeth. In S. nebulosus, the toothpad forms a short and broad band. On the lower jaw, or mandible, the teeth of Syndontis are attached to flexible, stalk-like structures and described as "s-shaped" or "hooked". The number of teeth on the mandible is used to differentiate between species; in S. nebulosus, there are about 18 teeth on the mandible.

The base body color is yellowish green, with ill-defined, irregular brown to black spots. The underside of the fish is yellowish white. The fins are yellowish green with black spots.

The maximum standard length of the species is 15 centimetres (5.9 in). Generally, females in the genus Synodontis tend to be slightly larger than males of the same age.

== Habitat and behavior ==
In the wild, the species has been found in the middle Zambezi River basin, as well as the Pungwe River and Buzi River. It inhabits rivers and floodplains, favoring floodplains, but does not occur in rocky areas. The reproductive habits of most of the species of Synodontis are not known, beyond some instances of obtaining egg counts from gravid females. Spawning likely occurs during the flooding season between July and October, and pairs swim in unison during spawning. As a whole, species of Synodontis are omnivores, consuming insect larvae, algae, gastropods, bivalves, sponges, crustaceans, and the eggs of other fishes. The growth rate is rapid in the first year, then slows down as the fish age.
