= Stella da Graça Pinto Novo Zeca =

Stella da Graça Pinto Novo Zeca is a politician in Mozambique.

Stella da Graça Pinto Novo Zeca became the governor of Gaza Province in 2015.

Filipe Nyusi appointed Stella da Graça Pinto Novo Zeca the provincial secretary for Sofala Province in 2020.
