= Marina Pachinuapa =

Mozambican independence fighter and politician

Member of the People's Assembly
- In office 1977–
- Constituency: Sofala Province

Marina Pachinuapa is a Mozambican independence fighter and politician. In 1977 she was one of the first group of women elected to the People's Assembly.

== Biography ==
Pachinuapa was involved in the Mozambican War of Independence, founding the Female Detachment of FRELIMO. She later held the rank of colonel in the military reserve, and was among the founders of the Organization of Mozambican Women. Following independence, she was a FRELIMO candidate in the 1977 parliamentary elections, in which she was one of the first group of 27 women elected to the People's Assembly. She was re-elected in 1986 from Sofala Province representing Moçambique Industrial. In 2010 she was appointed to the National Defence and Security Council.
