= Cyclone Idai =

South-West Indian Ocean cyclone in 2019

Intense Tropical Cyclone Idai
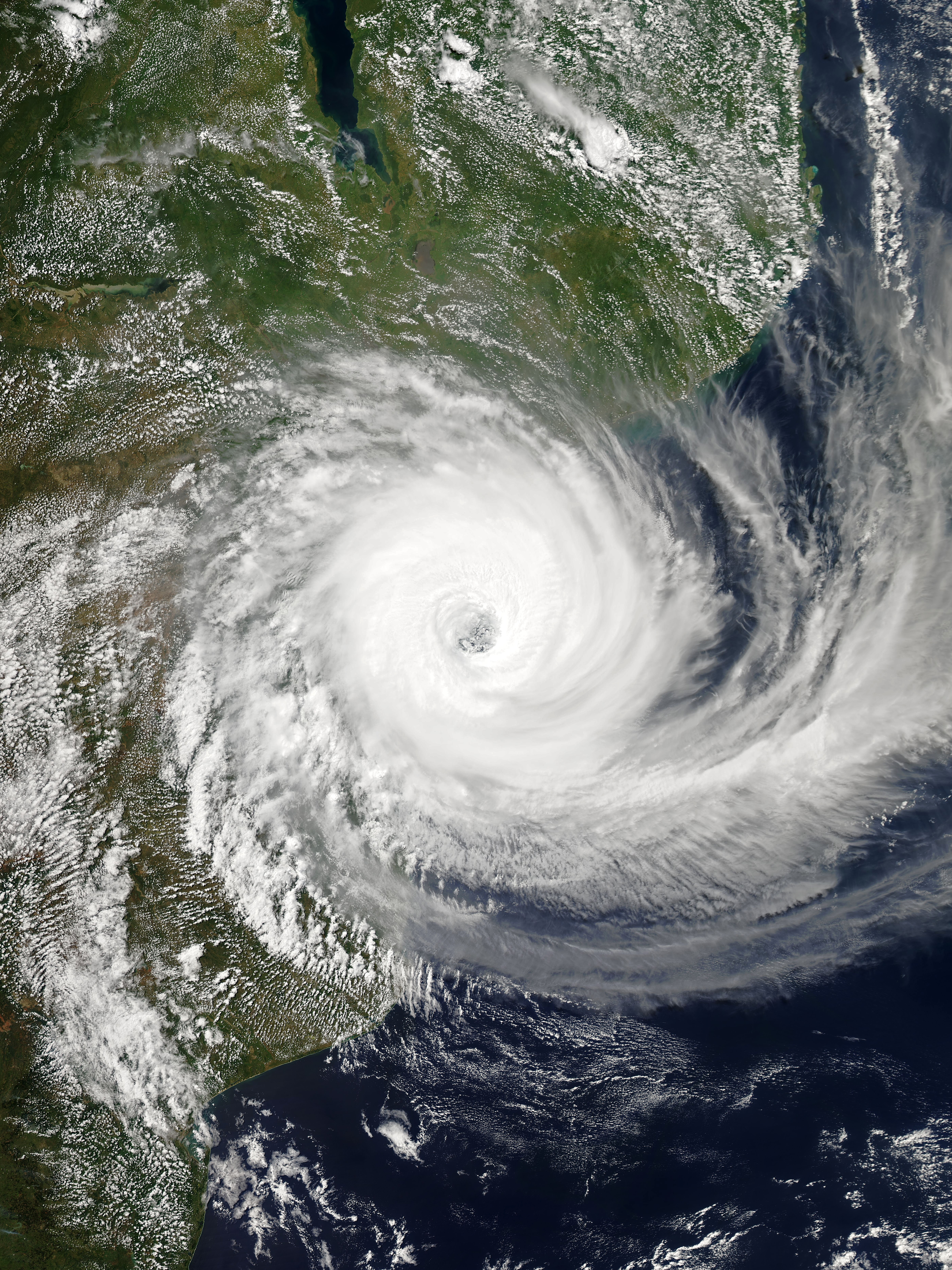
- Intense Tropical Cyclone Idai approaching Mozambique shortly after its peak intensity on 14 March

Meteorological history
- Formed: 4 March 2019
- Remnant low: 16 March 2019
- Dissipated: 21 March 2019

Intense tropical cyclone
- 10-minute sustained (MFR)
- Highest winds: 195 km/h (120 mph)
- Highest gusts: 280 km/h (175 mph)
- Lowest pressure: 940 hPa (mbar); 27.76 inHg

Category 4-equivalent tropical cyclone
- 1-minute sustained (SSHWS/JTWC)
- Highest winds: 215 km/h (130 mph)
- Lowest pressure: 947 hPa (mbar); 27.96 inHg

Overall effects
- Fatalities: 1,593 total (Note: Approximately 126 deaths occurred in Malawi and Mozambique from the flooding that preceded Idai's second landfall.) (Note: At least 536 deaths occurred in Mozambique and 634 in Zimbabwe after Idai made its second landfall.) (Deadliest tropical cyclone in the South-West Indian Ocean, second-deadliest tropical cyclone recorded in the Southern Hemisphere)
- Missing: ≥2,262
- Damage: $3.3 billion (2019 USD) (Second costliest tropical cyclone in the South-West Indian Ocean, costliest when adjusted for inflation)
- Areas affected: Northern and Central Mozambique; Malawi; northern Madagascar; Zimbabwe
- IBTrACS
- Part of the 2018–19 South-West Indian Ocean cyclone season

Intense Tropical Cyclone Idai (/ɪˈdaɪ, ˈiːdaɪ/) was one of the costliest and deadliest tropical cyclones on record to affect Africa and the Southern Hemisphere. The long-lived storm caused catastrophic damage, and a humanitarian crisis in Mozambique, Zimbabwe, and Malawi, leaving more than 1,500 people dead and many more missing. Idai is the deadliest tropical cyclone recorded in the South-West Indian Ocean basin. In the Southern Hemisphere, which includes the Australian, South Pacific, and South Atlantic basins, Idai ranks as the second-deadliest tropical cyclone on record. The only system with a higher death toll is the 1973 Flores cyclone that killed 1,650 off the coast of Indonesia. Idai is also the second costliest tropical cyclone in the South-West Indian Ocean basin, behind Cyclone Chido of 2024.

The tenth named storm, seventh tropical cyclone, and seventh intense tropical cyclone of the 2018–19 South-West Indian Ocean cyclone season, Idai originated from a tropical depression that formed off the east coast of Mozambique on 4 March 2019. The storm, Tropical Depression 11, made landfall in Mozambique later in the day and remained a tropical depression through its five-day trek over land. On 9 March, the depression re-emerged into the Mozambique Channel and strengthened into Moderate Tropical Storm Idai on the next day. Idai then began a stint of rapid intensification, reaching an initial peak intensity as an intense tropical cyclone, with sustained winds of 175 km/h (109 mph) on 11 March. Idai then began to weaken, due to ongoing structural changes within its inner core, falling to tropical cyclone intensity. Idai's intensity remained stagnant for about a day or so before it began to re-intensify. On 14 March, Idai reached its peak intensity, with maximum sustained winds of 195 km/h (121 mph) and a minimum central pressure of 940 hPa (27.76 inHg). Idai then began to weaken as it approached the coast of Mozambique, due to less favourable conditions, weakening below intense tropical cyclone status later that day. On 15 March, Idai made landfall near Beira, Mozambique, subsequently weakening into a remnant low on 16 March. Idai's remnants slowly continued inland for another day, before reversing course and turning eastward on 17 March. On 19 March, Idai's remnants re-emerged into the Mozambique Channel and eventually dissipated on 21 March.

Idai brought strong winds and caused severe flooding in Madagascar, Mozambique, Malawi, and Zimbabwe, which killed at least 1,593 people – and affected more than 3 million others. Catastrophic damage occurred in and around Beira in central Mozambique. The President of Mozambique stated that more than 1,000 people may have died in the storm. A major humanitarian crisis unfolded in the wake of the cyclone, with hundreds of thousands of people in urgent need of assistance across Mozambique and Zimbabwe. In the former nation, rescuers were forced to let some people die in order to save others. A cholera outbreak ensued in the storm's wake, with more than 4,000 confirmed cases and seven fatalities by 10 April. Total damages from Idai across Mozambique, Zimbabwe, Madagascar, and Malawi were estimated to be around $3.3 billion (2019 USD), with US$1 billion in infrastructure damages, making Idai the second costliest tropical cyclone in the South-West Indian Ocean basin.

== Meteorological history ==
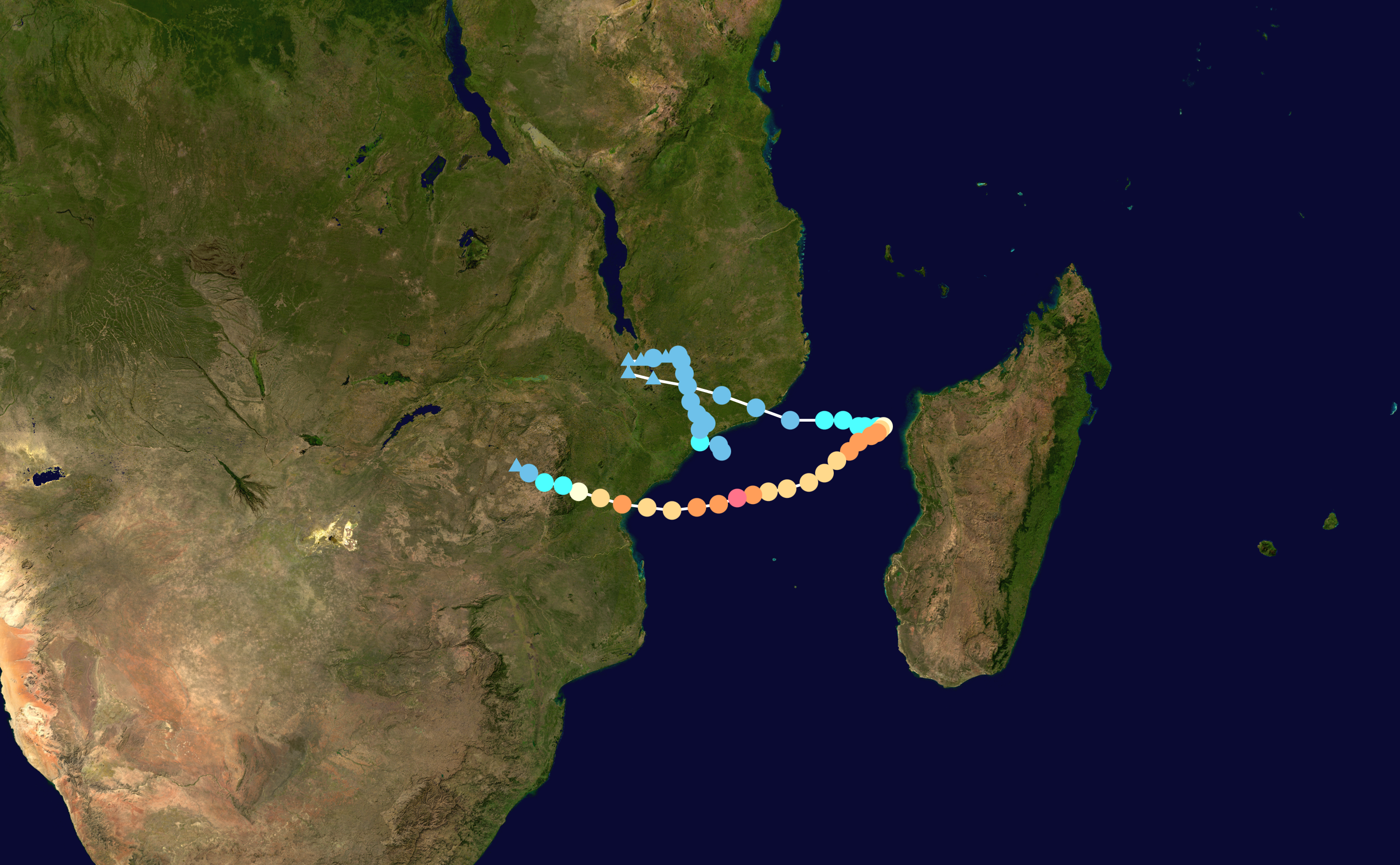
Map plotting the storm's track and intensity, according to the Saffir–Simpson scale Map key Saffir–Simpson scale Tropical depression (≤38 mph, ≤62 km/h) Tropical storm (39–73 mph, 63–118 km/h) Category 1 (74–95 mph, 119–153 km/h) Category 2 (96–110 mph, 154–177 km/h) Category 3 (111–129 mph, 178–208 km/h) Category 4 (130–156 mph, 209–251 km/h) Category 5 (≥157 mph, ≥252 km/h) Unknown Storm type Tropical cyclone Subtropical cyclone Extratropical cyclone, remnant low, tropical disturbance, or monsoon depression

Cyclone Idai originated from an elongated circulation that the Météo-France office in Réunion (MFR) began monitoring on 1 March. At that time, it was in the Mozambique Channel and was moving west-southwest, towards Africa's east coast. The MFR continued to track the system over the next couple of days as it developed strong deep convection. On 4 March, the MFR stated that Tropical Depression 11 had formed off the east coast of Mozambique. The depression slowly moved westward, making landfall in Mozambique later in the day. The system retained its status as a tropical depression through its existence over land. Shortly after landfall, the system turned to the north. Over the next several days, Tropical Depression 11 performed a counterclockwise loop near the border of Malawi and Mozambique, before turning eastward and re-emerging into the Mozambique Channel, early on 9 March. On 8 March, at 22:00 UTC, the Joint Typhoon Warning Center (JTWC) issued a Tropical Cyclone Formation Alert (TCFA), noting a consolidating low-level circulation center and that the system was in a favourable environment with low wind shear and sea surface temperatures exceeding 30 °C (86 °F).

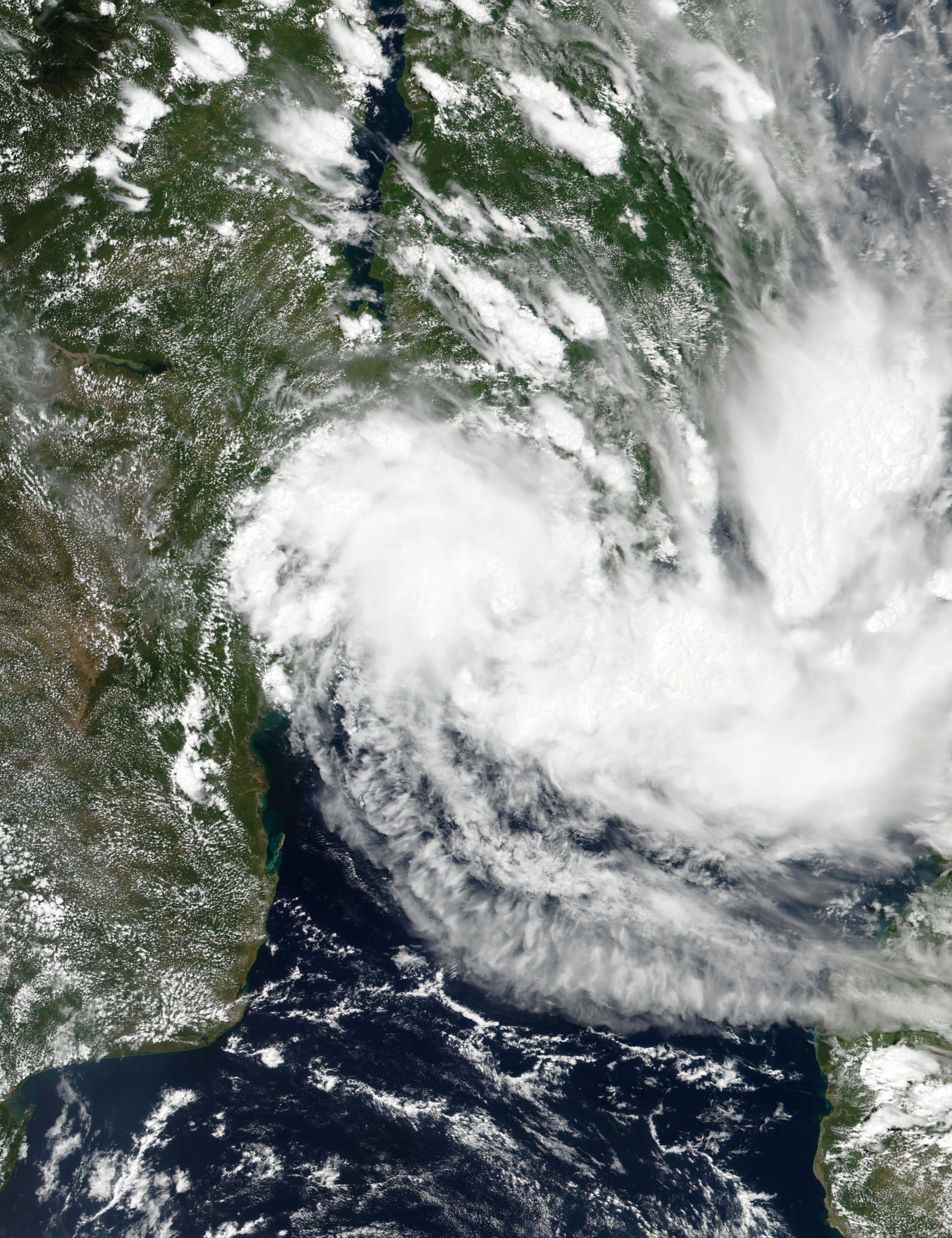
Tropical Depression 11 moving ashore in Mozambique on 4 March

On 9 March, after Tropical Depression 11 had re-entered the Mozambique Channel, the JTWC issued its first warning on the system, classifying it as Tropical Cyclone 18S. At 00:00 UTC on 10 March, the MFR upgraded the system to a moderate tropical storm and designated it as Idai, after an increase in organised convection and the development of banding features. Idai then began a period of rapid intensification, with the MFR upgrading it to tropical cyclone status by 18:00 UTC. At the same time, the JTWC upgraded it to the equivalent of a Category 1 hurricane on the Saffir–Simpson scale. Additionally, the strengthening of a subtropical ridge to the southwest and the weakening of the Intertropical Convergence Zone to the north resulted in a decrease in the forward motion of the storm. Around 12:00 UTC on 11 March, Idai reached its initial peak intensity as an intense tropical cyclone, the seventh storm of that intensity that season, with 10-minute maximum sustained winds of 175 km/h (109 mph). At that time, the MFR reported that the internal structure of the cyclone had improved, with an eye visible in infrared imagery. Meanwhile, the JTWC estimated 1-minute winds of 215 km/h (134 mph), the equivalent of a Category 4 major hurricane, although operationally, the JTWC classified Idai as a Category 3-equivalent tropical cyclone.

Soon afterward, Idai began a weakening trend as it entered an eyewall replacement cycle and experienced dry air entanglement. It was also noted that Idai was tracking towards the southwest, under the increasing influence of the subtropical ridge to the north. On 12 March at 06:00 UTC, Idai bottomed out at tropical cyclone status with 10-minute winds of 130 km/h (81 mph). At that time, the MFR noted that Idai had a poorly defined eye, as the eyewall replacement cycle was still underway. Over the next day, Idai's intensity changed very little due to ongoing structural changes within its inner core. At the same time, Idai began to travel in a westerly direction. By 18:00 UTC on 13 March, Idai had developed a large eye and taken on the characteristics of an annular tropical cyclone. Six hours later, Idai reached peak intensity, with 10-minute maximum sustained winds of 195 km/h (121 mph) and a minimum central pressure of 940 hPa (27.76 inHg). At that time, the JTWC also reported that Idai had reached peak intensity, with 1-minute sustained winds of 205 km/h (127 mph). Soon afterward, Idai began to weaken, due to lower sea surface temperatures and vertical wind shear as it neared the coast of Mozambique.

At 00:00 UTC on 15 March, the MFR reported that Idai had made landfall near Beira, Mozambique, with 10-minute sustained winds of 165 km/h (103 mph). Shortly afterward, the JTWC issued its final warning on Idai, stating that the cyclone had diminishing eyewall convection and warming cloud tops. Idai quickly weakened after landfall; at 06:00 UTC that day, the MFR declared that Idai had degenerated into an overland depression, with gale-force winds as it continued to move inland. Six hours later, the MFR issued its last warning on Idai. At that time, it was forecast that Idai's circulation would persist for several more days, and would drop heavy rainfall throughout the region during that time. The MFR continued to monitor Idai for the next few days, with Idai degenerating into a remnant low late on 16 March. On 17 March, the MFR noted that only a wide clockwise circulation remained over eastern Zimbabwe, though rain from Idai's remnant was still affecting the entire region. On the same day, Idai's remnants turned eastward once again, eventually re-emerging into the Mozambique Channel a second time on 19 March. Idai's remnants encountered unfavourable conditions and rapidly weakened thereafter, dissipating late on 21 March over the Mozambique Channel.

== Impact ==
Deaths and damage by country (Note: Sources in text)
Nation	Fatalities	Missing	Injuries	Affected	Damage (2019 USD)
Madagascar	1	2	0	1,100	—N/a
Malawi	60	3	672	975,672	—N/a
Mozambique	905	2,000	1,594	1,900,000	$3 billion
Zimbabwe	634	257	>232	270,000	$274 million
Totals:	1,593	>2,262	>2,450	3,044,000	$3.3 billion

Idai caused severe flooding throughout Madagascar, Malawi, Mozambique, and Zimbabwe resulting in at least 1,593 deaths. More than 3 million people experienced the direct effects of the cyclone, with hundreds of thousands in need of assistance. Infrastructural damage from Idai across these countries totaled at least US$1 billion.

=== Mozambique ===
Throughout Mozambique, Idai killed at least 602 people, injured 1,641 others, and inflicted an estimated US$773 million in damage.

==== First landfall ====
Flooding from the precursor depression began in Mozambique on 6 March, primarily affecting north-central provinces. The Niassa, Tete and Zambezia provinces were affected, the latter being hardest-hit. Flooding from the tropical depression killed 66 people and injured 111 more. It was reported that 5,756 homes were destroyed, while another 15,467 homes were affected. Additionally, eight hospitals and 938 classrooms were destroyed. The floods also ruined 168,000 hectares (420,000 acres) of crops.

==== Second landfall ====
Costliest South-West Indian Ocean tropical cyclones
Rank	Tropical cyclones	Season	Damage
1	4 Chido	2024–25	$3.9 billion
2	4 Idai	2018–19	$3.3 billion
3	3 Gezani	2025–26	$2 billion
4	5 Freddy	2022–23	$1.53 billion
5	3 Garance	2024–25	$1.05 billion
6	3 Fytia	2025–26	$475 million
7	4 Enawo	2016–17	$400 million
8	4 Kenneth	2018–19	$345 million
9	4 Leon–Eline	1999–00	$309 million
10	4 Dina	2001–02	$287 million

During its second landfall, Cyclone Idai wrought catastrophic damage across a large swath of central and western Mozambique. Destructive winds devastated coastal communities and flash floods destroyed inland communities in what the World Meteorological Organization termed "one of the worst weather-related disasters in the southern hemisphere". At least 532 people were killed from the combined effects of flooding and wind. In Beira, airborne debris caused numerous injuries; in some instances, sheet metal from roofs decapitated people. More than 1,500 people were treated for storm-related injuries, primarily from airborne debris, in hospitals across Beira. As of 7 April, assessments indicate the destruction of 111,163 homes, damage to another 112,735 houses, and flooding to a further 15,784 structures. An estimated 1.85 million people were affected by the cyclone. Alongside damage to infrastructure, approximately 711,000 ha (1,760,000 acres) of crops were damaged or destroyed nationwide. Much of this land near the landfall area was near-harvest, compounding the risk of food shortages and placing the country at high-risk of famine.

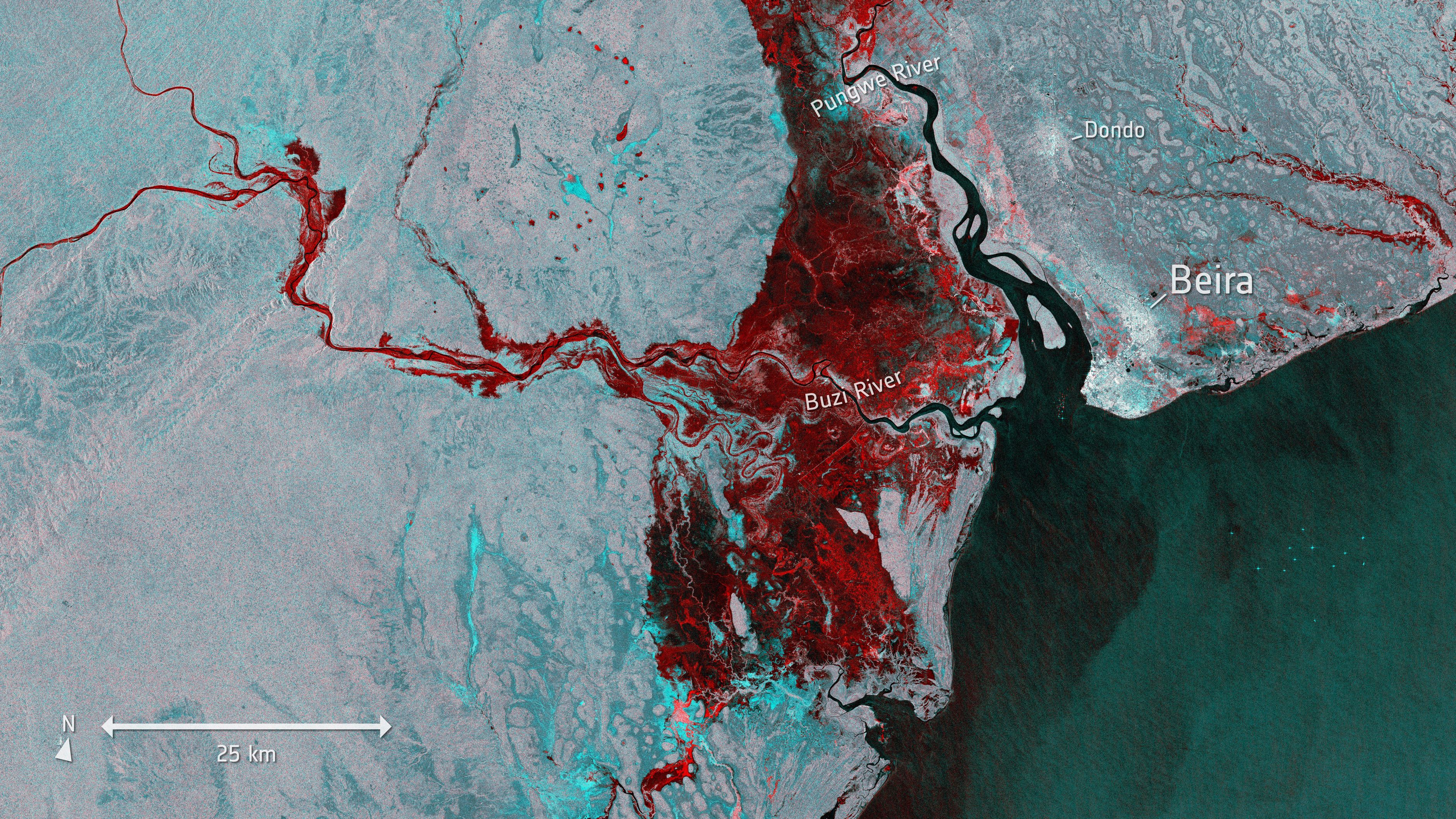
False-color satellite imagery of flooding (depicted in red) on 19 March in the region where Idai made its second landfall

Making landfall in Mozambique near Beira, Idai produced a storm surge of 4.4 m (14 ft) in the city. Coupled with torrential rains, including earlier rainfall, disastrous flooding ensued in the region. Officials called the extensive flooded areas "an inland ocean" visible even from outer space. More than 500,000 people in the city, the majority of the population, lost power. Rainfall in the city exceeded 200 mm (8 in), while the heaviest totals of more than 600 mm (24 in) fell near Chimoio. As of 19 March, 100,000 people were reported as requiring rescue in the Beira area. The IFRC reported that 90% of the area in Beira was totally destroyed. Communications in the city were crippled and all roads out were rendered impassable. All 17 of the city's hospitals and health centers suffered damage. The International Federation of Red Cross and Red Crescent Societies described damage in the region as "massive and horrifying" and the President of Mozambique stated that over 1,000 people may have died. Bodies were found floating in floodwaters in Beira days after the storm hit.

A tsunami-like wave of water devastated Nhamatanda, sweeping many people to their deaths and destroying the town. People scrambled to rooftops in order to survive. Days after landfall, the Buzi and Pungwe rivers in central Mozambique overflowed their banks. Unprecedented flooding ensued along the banks of the Buzi River. President Filipe Nyusi stated "whole villages [disappeared]" along the Buzi and Pungwe banks. On 17 March, rivers in the western provinces of Mozambique were hit with floodwaters from rising rivers. The city of Búzi continued to flood as of 20 March, placing its 200,000 residents at high-risk. On 19 March, a 50 km (31 mi) section of the Buzi remained flooded. Thousands of people remained trapped on rooftops four days after Idai made landfall. Floodwaters estimated to be 6 m (20 ft) submerged entire communities.

=== Malawi ===
Following its first landfall, Idai brought torrential rains to southeastern Malawi as a tropical depression. These areas saw above-average rainfall in January, enhancing the risk for floods. Widespread flooding began on 9 March, washing out bridges, roads, and destroying numerous homes. Fourteen districts experienced direct effects from the storm, with Nsanje and Phalombe being hardest-hit. Rising waters overwhelmed flood mitigating infrastructure, causing dams to collapse. Approximately 1,400 homes were destroyed in Blantyre. After Idai made its second landfall in Mozambique on 15 March, the storm caused even more damage in the region. Two hydroelectric power plants along the Shire River suffered damage and were taken offline, rendering a loss of 270 MW of Malawi's 320 MW hydroelectric power capacity.

The disaster directly affected 922,900 people nationwide–an estimated 460,000 being children–125,382 of whom were displaced or rendered homeless. A total of 60 people were killed and 577 others were reported injured as a result of flooding. A further three people are reported missing.

=== Madagascar ===
While over the Mozambique Channel, the system brought heavy rains to northwestern Madagascar, with localised accumulations of approximately 400 mm (16 in). Flooding and mudslides in Besalampy killed one person, left two missing, and affected 1,100 others, as well as damaging 137 homes. Widespread damage occurred to homes, hospitals and schools. Numerous electricity and telephone wires were damaged or destroyed.

=== Zimbabwe ===
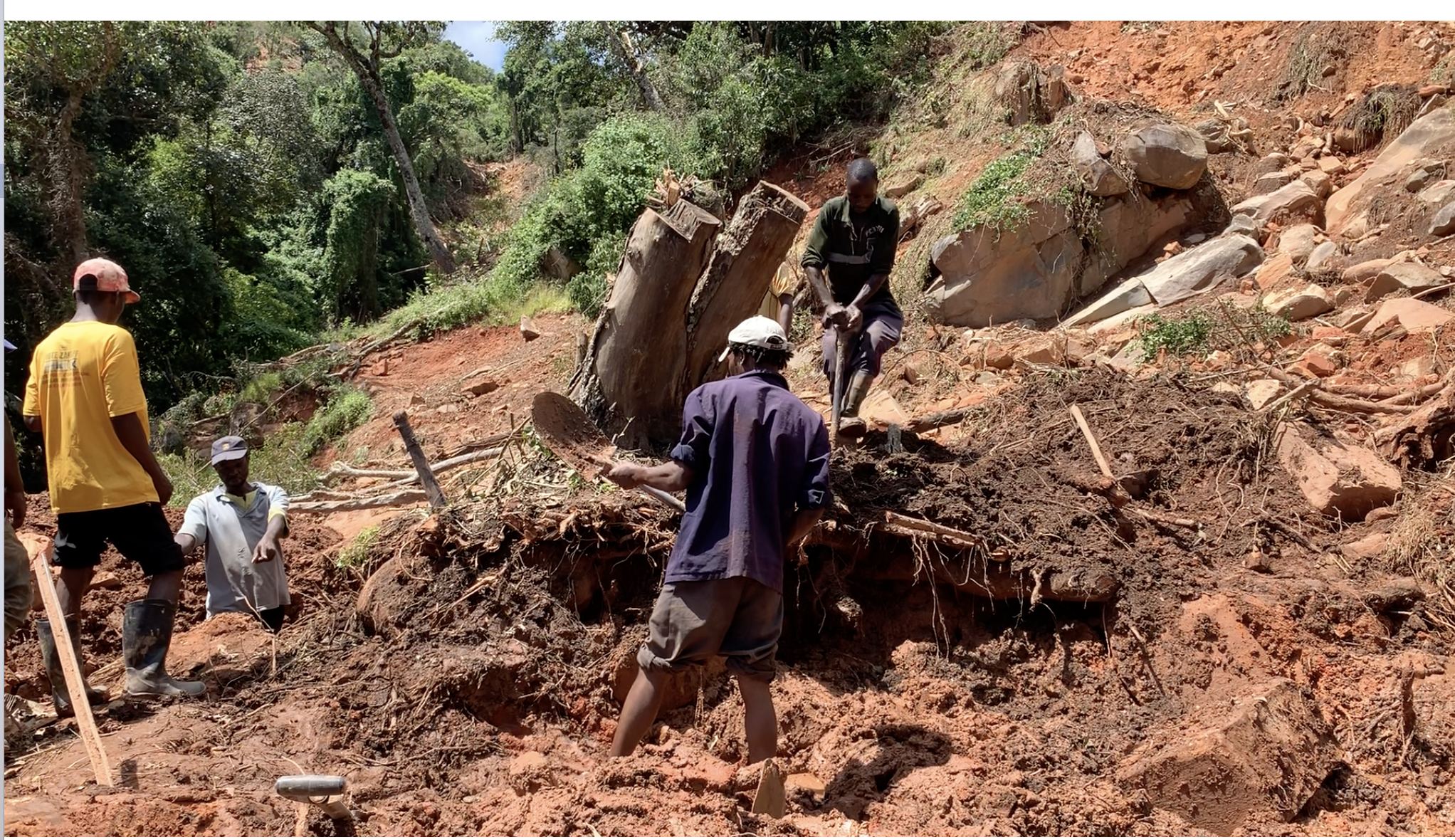
Residents searching for a victim after Idai triggered a landslide in Chimanimani District, Zimbabwe

Heavy rains fell across much of eastern Zimbabwe as the cyclone meandered along the nation's border with Mozambique. The heaviest rains fell in the Chimanimani District and Chipinge District, with accumulations reaching 200–400 mm (8–20 in). Widespread flash flooding ensued, claiming at least 634 lives, with at least 257 people missing as of 7 April. Of these deaths, at least 169 were in Chimanimani. An unknown number of bodies were swept into neighboring areas of Mozambique, and at least 82 were confirmed to have been buried as far as 40 km (25 mi) into that nation. At least 232 people were injured in Chimanimani. An estimated 270,000 people were affected by the storm.

The Chimanimani and Chipinge districts saw extensive damage with widespread flash flooding. To date much of the victims have not fully recovered from the effects of this cyclone. The Nyahonde River burst its banks and inundated numerous communities. Destruction of numerous bridges and roads in eastern Chimanimani isolated many residents. In the town of Chipinge, 600 houses have been destroyed and 20,000 damaged. On 19 March, water overflowed the Marowanyati Dam in Murambinda, along the Mwerahari River.

== Aftermath ==
=== Local aid and response ===
"Sometimes we can only save two out of five, sometimes we drop food and go to someone else who's in bigger danger... We just save what we can save and the others will perish."

— Ian Scher, head of Rescue South Africa

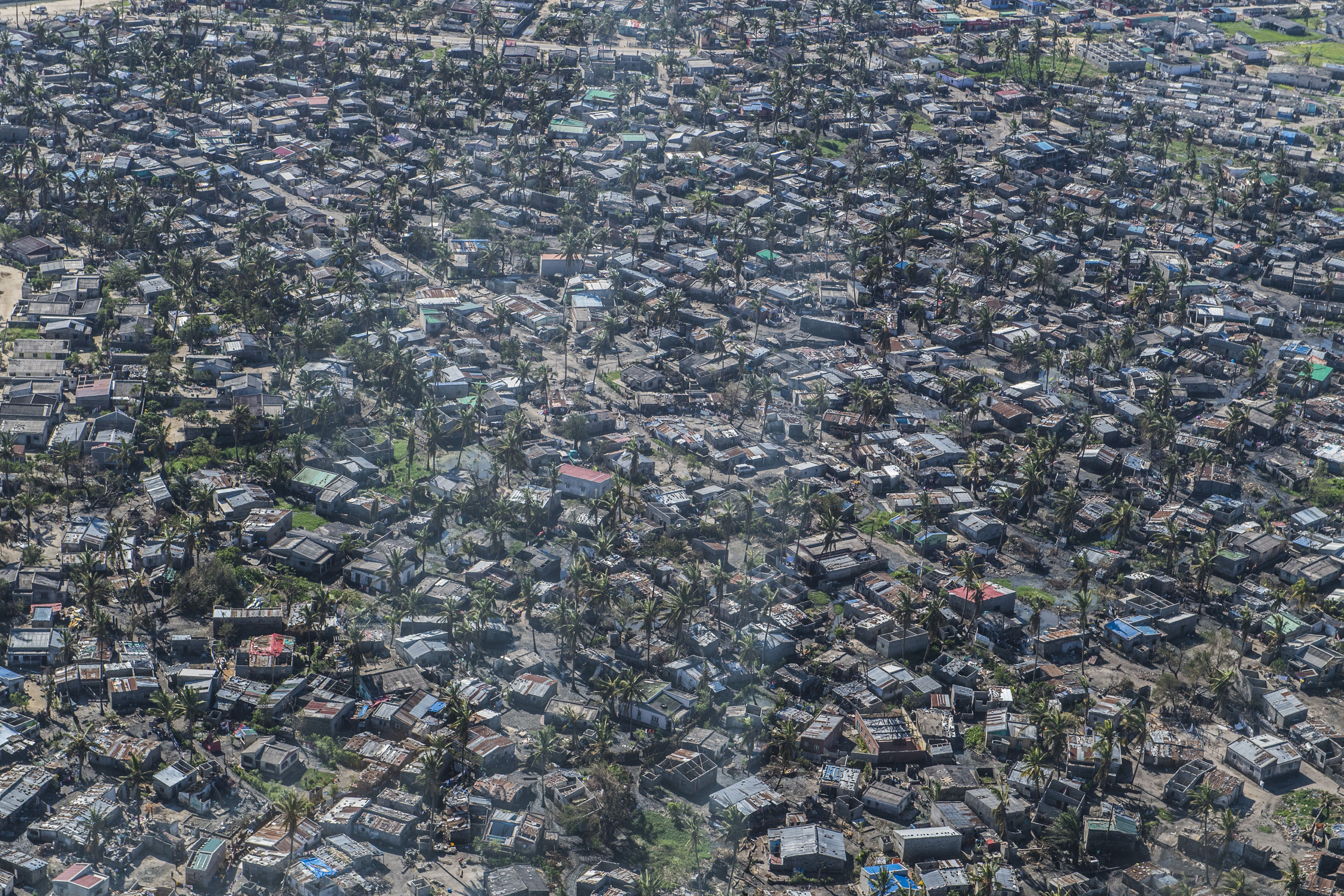
Housing in Beira destroyed by the cyclone.

Following the first round of flooding in Mozambique, the government requested MT1.1 billion (US$17.6 million) to provide aid for flood victims. The magnitude of the humanitarian crisis overwhelmed rescuers. In many instances, victims had to be abandoned in fatal conditions in order to save others in more dire need. The National Disasters Management Institute, normally considered capable of handling disasters in Mozambique, could not cope with the scale of the disaster. The agency deployed boats and helicopters to save residents. Inadequate assistance left thousands of victims stranded in trees and on rooftops five days after the cyclone hit. Beira remained largely inaccessible through 20 March with infrastructure devastated and floodwaters yet to recede. The Mozambique Minister of Land and Environment, Celso Correia, stated on 21 March that an estimated 15,000 people still required rescue. A total of 128,941 people were displaced to 143 evacuation centers nationwide, often in extremely poor conditions. Three-fourths of the displaced persons reside in Sofala Province where the cyclone made its second landfall. It was reported on 23 March that many local emergency centers in Mozambique had only recently been supplied with food, and some areas remained cut off.

Malawi President Peter Mutharika declared a state of emergency for affected districts on 8 March prompting mobilisation of the Malawian Defence Force. The government estimated $16.4 million was needed to ease the effects of damage due to flooding. Initial estimates placed the number of people in urgent need of aid at 120,000, primarily in the Chikwawa, Nsanje, Zomba, Mulanje, Phalombe, and Mangochi districts. With the support of the Danish Red Cross, the Malawi Red Cross Society provided K18 million (US$25,000) worth of supplies to displaced persons on 11 March. On 11 March, the Malawi Revenue Authority provided K21 million (US$29,000) worth of supplies–in the form of 7.5 tonnes of maize flour, 500 bales of sugar, and 20 tonnes of salt–and gave a monetary donation of K2 million (US$3,000). Local officials established 187 evacuation camps while churches and schools were utilised as makeshift shelters. However, these lacked adequate capacity and many people were forced to sleep in the open. Through 18 March, large portions of Chikwawa and Nsanje districts remained inaccessible by land; helicopters and boats were utilised to deliver supplies to these areas.

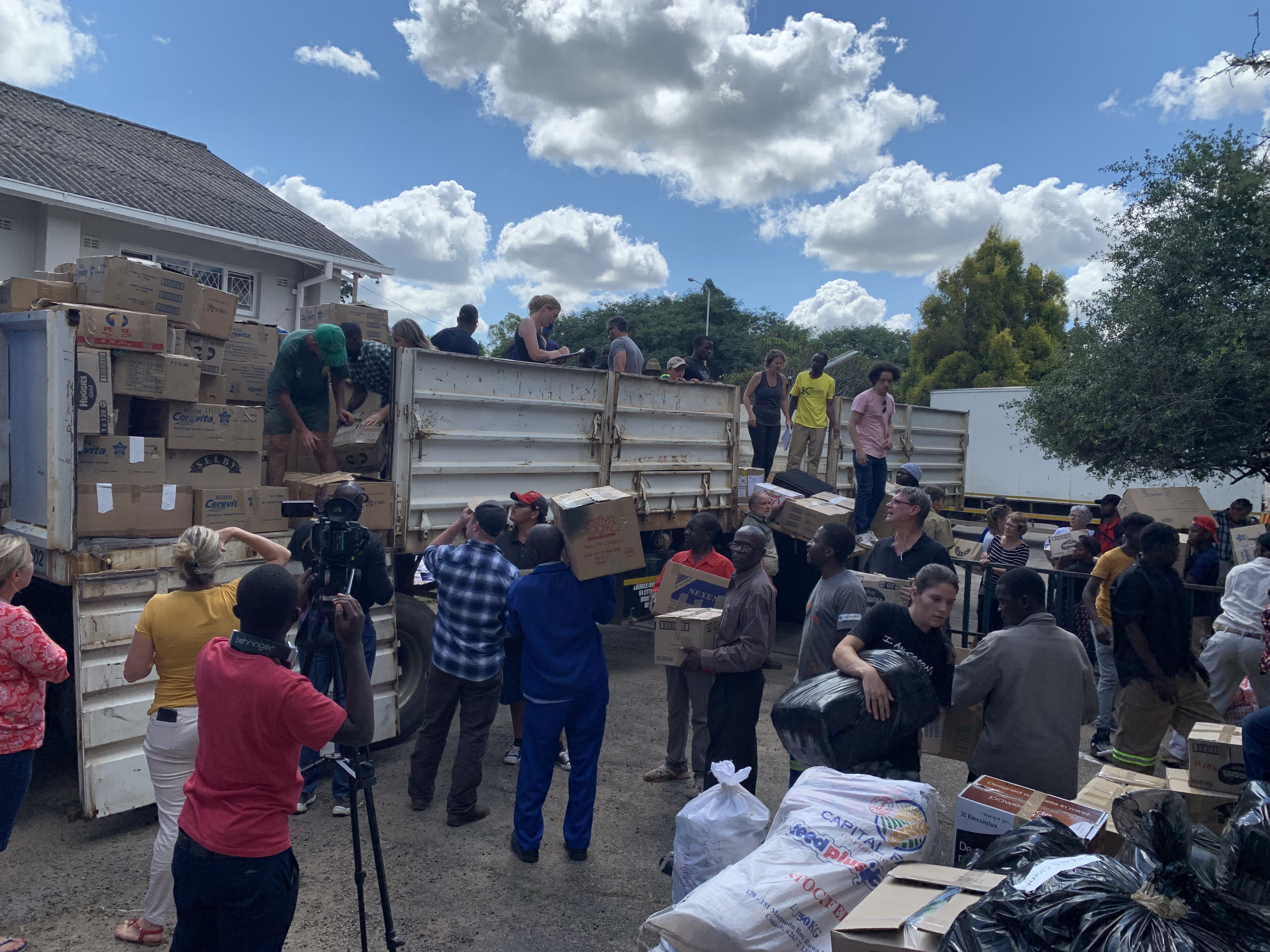
Volunteers help deliver the aid to those affected by Idai in Chimanimani District, Zimbabwe.

Zimbabwe President Emmerson Mnangagwa declared a state of emergency soon after the storm and deployed the National Army and Air Force. A command center was established in Harare by 17 March to co-ordinate rescue and relief efforts. Persistent heavy rain, continued flooding, and mudslides hampered relief efforts, leaving many residents stranded without assistance. Harare Councilor Jacon Mafume called the event a "serious humanitarian crisis" and called upon the state for "intervention on a massive scale to avoid biblical disaster". The Government of Zimbabwe allocated RTGS$50 million for emergency response and reconstruction. Medical supplies were sent to Mutare; however, damaged infrastructure hampered distribution. Residents established collection centers in Bulawayo and Harare. Some affected areas remain difficult to reach as of 22 March, including Chimanimani. Mnangagwa declared that Zimbabwe would begin two days of mourning for victims of the cyclone on 23 March.

On 4 April 2019, Zimbabwe Cricket announced that all the profits from the third One Day International (ODI) match between Zimbabwe and the United Arab Emirates would go to the relief efforts.

==== Search for remains ====
Efforts to recover bodies of flood victims proved difficult across Mozambique. Scavenger animals—such as crocodiles, hippos, dogs, snakes, and large pigs—posed the risk of bodies being consumed. In areas with violent flooding, only pieces of corpses were recovered. In one instance Stephen Fonseca, the forensic coordinator for Africa with the Red Cross, found a piece of a spine and a few bones of a child. Fonseca found bodies mangled in treetops where the victims attempted to escape rising waters. Small villages quickly buried the dead, likely without reporting to the government, including those washed in from Zimbabwe. Cadaver dogs were utilized to locate remains across flooded farmlands. The exact death toll is not expected to ever be known between the decomposition of bodies, consumption by animals, and unreported burials. Identification of some recovered remains is near impossible due to a lack of forensic reference records for some victims. In order to facilitate DNA identification where reference material was available, on July 15, 2019, Collen Masimirembwa, Chief Scientific Officer of the African Institute of Biomedical Science and Technology requested a computer and software system to facilitate forensic DNA identification of victims in Zimbabwe and Mozambique. The system, called M-FISys (pronounced like "emphasis," an acronym for the Mass-Fatality Identification System), was originally developed to identify victims of the World Trade Center Disaster of September 11, 2001.

==== Sexual exploitation allegations ====
On 26 April, the United Nations announced that it would be investigating sexual exploitation allegations in the wake of Idai. According to Human Rights Watch, several females were forced to have sexual intercourse with local Mozambican leaders in order to receive food aid.

=== United Nations ===
In Malawi, UNICEF provided various sanitary supplies to residents in Chikwawa, Mangochi, Nsanje, and Phalombe. These included hygiene kits, filtered water bottles, soap, packets of oral rehydration solution, antibiotics for children, and insecticide-treated bednets. Additional supplies were sent to regional hospitals. The agency assessed a long-term need of $8.3 million to assist women and children.

In the immediate aftermath of Idai, UNICEF estimated that about $10 million was required for the most urgent needs of children in Mozambique. The United Nations and their partners appealed for $40.8 million as an emergency relief to help those people who were affected by Idai in Mozambique. The United Nations World Food Programme (WFP) scrambled to airdrop high-energy biscuits and easy-to-cook food to isolated villages. On 20 March the WFP airlifted 20 tons of food from Dubai to the region. An Mi-8 transport helicopter contracted through the United Nations Humanitarian Air Service was brought in the same day, with two more expected to be flown in. By 22 March, a total of US$20 million had been made available from the UN's emergency fund, and the UN Secretary General appealed for increased international support, citing food insecurity across Mozambique, Malawi and Zimbabwe, as well as the need for reconstruction.

On 23 March, the WFP declared the disaster in Mozambique a "level-three emergency", the highest level of crisis. This puts it in the same category as the civil wars in Yemen, Syria, and South Sudan.

=== International aid ===
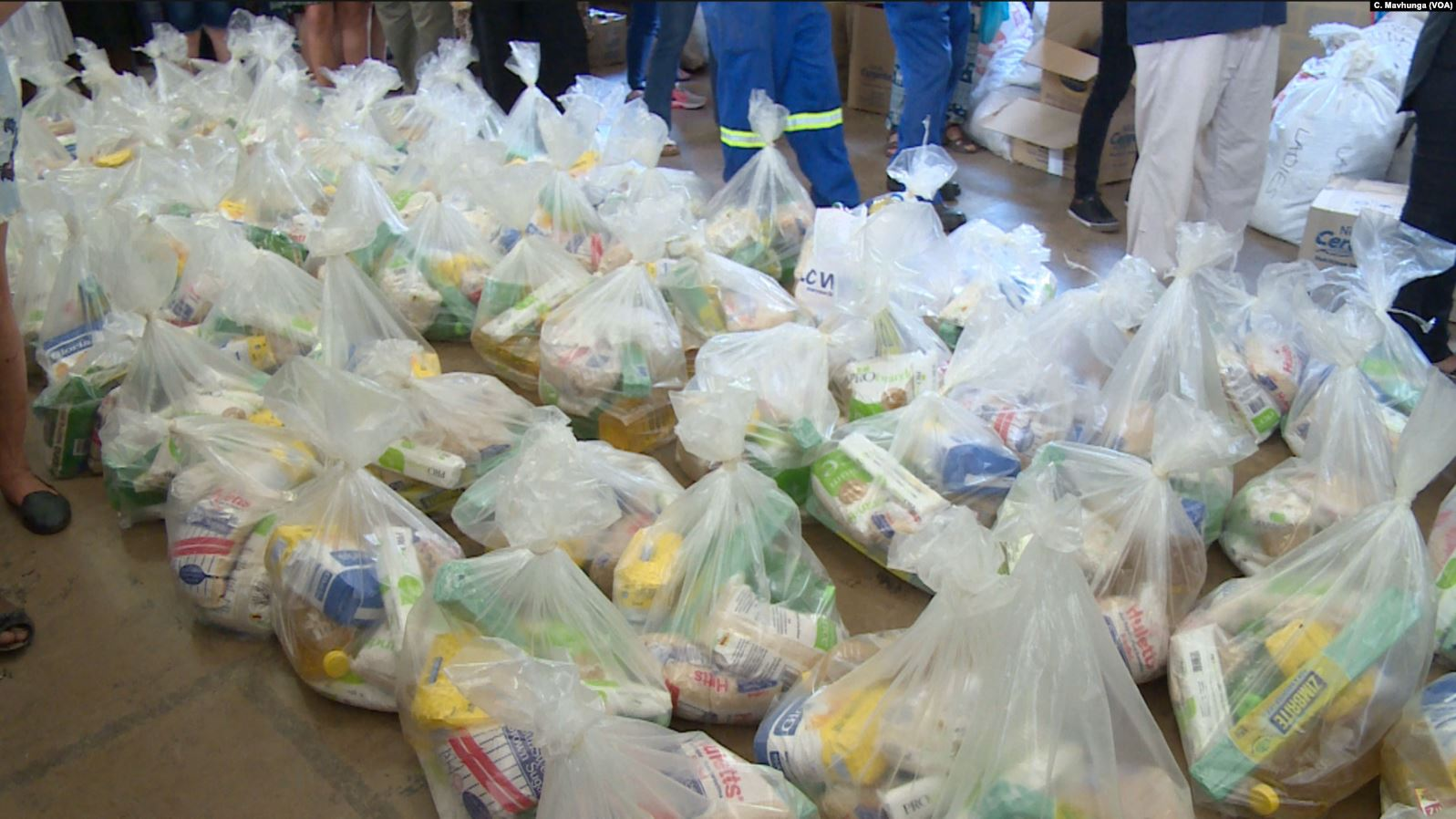
Donated items placed in Harare for those affected by Cyclone Idai

The International Federation of Red Cross and Red Crescent Societies (IFRC) called the disaster one of the worst humanitarian crises in recent history for Mozambique. An estimated 400,000 people were displaced by the storm and resulting floods. The agency appealed for 10 million Swiss francs in emergency funds to aid 75,000 people in dire need of assistance. The French Red Cross transported household items from their warehouse on Réunion within days of the cyclone. With support and funding from the French Government, the agency provided equipment to the Mozambique Red Cross to support relief operations. Three delegates each from the Emirates Red Crescent would be sent to Malawi, Mozambique, and Zimbabwe. The Portuguese Red Cross deployed a medical and disaster management "surge team" ahead of major operations by the IFRC. On 21 March, the Singapore Red Cross announced it would be donating S$121,000 (US$90,000) to aid in relief operations in Mozambique and put a team on standby to assist with disaster response. On 24 March, the IFRC revised their appeal for Mozambique in light of far greater damage than initially anticipated. The agency requested 31 million Swiss francs to support 200,000 victims for 2 years. Additional personnel, monetary, and disaster risk reduction support was provided by the Turkish Red Crescent, Spanish Red Cross, German Red Cross, and Belgian Red Cross.

The South African National Defence Force provided aerial and ground assistance to relief efforts in Malawi and Mozambique starting on 16 March. On 18 March, the Department for International Development of the United Kingdom sent £6 million (US$8 million) to Mozambique and Malawi as a humanitarian relief. The following day, 7,500 shelter kits and 100 family tents arrived in Mozambique to provide temporary housing to displaced persons. A further £12 million (US$16 million) worth of food, water, and shelter kits, was provided on 20 March. The country also assisted the WFP in providing food to 140,000 people through the end of March. On 19 March, the European Union released an emergency aid of €3.5 million (US$4 million) to Mozambique, Malawi and Zimbabwe, The United Arab Emirates sent د.إ18.3 million (US$5 million) worth of food, water, and shelter supplies. Norway provided kr6 million (US$700,000) to World Food Programme. On 22 March, Portugal contributed an aid of €29,000 (US$33,000) to Manica and Zambézia Province of Mozambique. Ireland will give €1.05 million (US$1.2 million) to the victims of Idai. Canada also distributed C$3.5 million (US$2.6 million) to the humanitarian organizations dealing with damage caused by Idai. IsraAid sent personnel to Mozambique to assist in the recovery. Personnel were readied to offer medical supplies, relief supplies, and psychological care to people affected by the storm. Personnel were also prepared to help restore access to safe water.

Médecins Sans Frontières arrived in Beira on 18 March to assess medical needs and treat victims. With clinics and hospitals across the region severely damaged or destroyed or lacking power and water, efforts to treat injuries were hampered. In conjunction with the Red Cross, The Salvation Army worked to provide two meals a day to 500 families in the city for three weeks beginning on 20 March. CARE Australia started an emergency appeal for funds on 20 March and deployed personnel in the affected nations. Two C-130 aircraft from the Portuguese Air Force carrying soldiers, medical personnel, and a disaster relief team left for Mozambique on 21 March. The Indian Navy diverted three ships to the Port of Beira to provide humanitarian assistance. Indian aid forces reported that relief efforts were made more difficult by strong tides, which gave them only "two-to-three-hour" intervals to act. By 24 March, the Government of Morocco deployed four aircraft from the Royal Armed Forces collectively carrying 39 tons of relief goods.

=== Disease outbreaks ===
Multiple aid agencies have highlighted the urgent need to supply clean water to people in the area, warning of the risk of disease. Cases of cholera (specifically from Vibrio cholerae), a disease transmitted via water contaminated with feces and endemic to Mozambique, were reported in Beira on 22 March. An outbreak of cholera subsequently ensued with 517 confirmed cases in the Beira area between 24 and 31 March. The number of confirmed cases exceeded 1,500 by 3 April. By 10 April, 4,072 confirmed cases were recorded with eight fatalities. The crowded and poor neighborhoods of the city were at greatest risk for continued spread of cholera. Médecins Sans Frontières reported at least 200 presumed cases per day. Additional presumed cases occurred in Buzi, Tica, and Nhamathanda; however, the more rural nature of these areas lessened the risk of a widespread outbreak.

An increase in the incidence of malaria was noted, attributed to malarial mosquitoes breeding in the stagnant water. Other potential risks identified include typhoid, another water-borne disease, and diarrheal diseases. At least four people contracted typhoid in Dombé, Manica Province, with reports of other illnesses appearing in the province. Mozambique health officials reported at least 2,700 cases of diarrhoea by 26 March.

The Red Cross described the risk of major outbreaks in the region as a "ticking bomb". The Canadian Red Cross established a field hospital with 53 tonnes of medical supplies and three land cruisers to distribute aid. The Government of China sprayed anti-cholera disinfectant across Beria and sent doctors. On 1 April, the World Health Organization provided 884,953 cholera vaccines and 900,000 bed nets to Mozambique. The agency's vaccination campaign began in earnest on 3 April. Efforts to control the spread of the disease were hampered by the destruction wrought by the cyclone, with 55 health centers destroyed in the region. Beira's main hospital suffered extensive damage, rendering six of its seven operating theaters unusable.

== See also ==
- Weather of 2019
- Tropical cyclones in 2019
- 1892 Mauritius cyclone – the third-deadliest tropical cyclone recorded in the South-West Indian Ocean basin
- 1927 Madagascar cyclone – a tropical cyclone that killed 500 people in Madagascar
- Cyclone Hyacinthe (1980) – the wettest tropical cyclone recorded worldwide, caused extensive damage in Madagascar, Réunion, and Mauritius
- Cyclone Leon–Eline (2000) – second-longest-lived tropical cyclone in the South-West Indian Ocean; affected similar areas in February 2000, killing at least 100 people
- Cyclone Funso (2012) – looped off the coast of Mozambique for several days in 2012, causing severe flooding
- Cyclone Hellen (2014) – underwent rapid intensification in the Mozambique Channel but weakened significantly before striking Madagascar and Mozambique
- Cyclone Dineo (2017) – most recent tropical cyclone to make landfall in Mozambique before Idai, killing over 200 people
- Cyclone Kenneth (2019) – the strongest landfalling cyclone in the recorded history of Mozambique; made landfall about a month after Idai
- Cyclone Eloise (2021) – next significant tropical cyclone to affect Mozambique after Idai
- Cyclone Freddy (2023) – the longest-lived tropical cyclone on record worldwide; affected similar areas in March 2023, killing over 1,000 people and becoming the second-deadliest cyclone in the South-West Indian Ocean
