= Teresa Tembo =

Mozambican politician

Member of the People's Assembly
- In office 1977–

Teresa Romão Tembo was a Mozambican politician. In 1977 she was one of the first group of women elected to the People's Assembly.

== Biography ==
Tembo was a FRELIMO candidate in the 1977 parliamentary elections, in which she was one of the first group of 27 women elected to the People's Assembly. She also served on the party's central committee. A founder member of the Organization of Mozambican Women, she later became its general secretary. In 2006 she was appointed to the Council of State.
