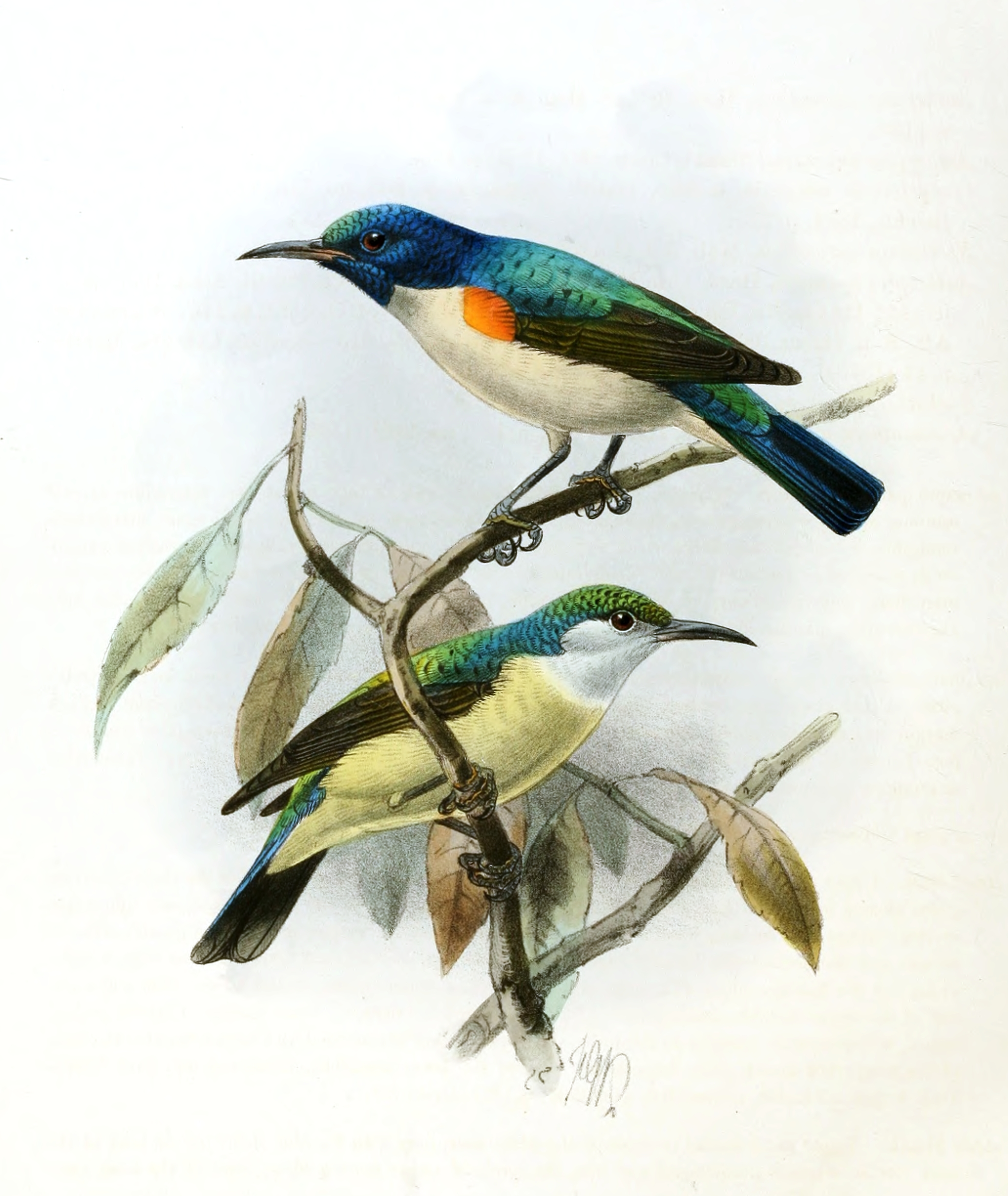

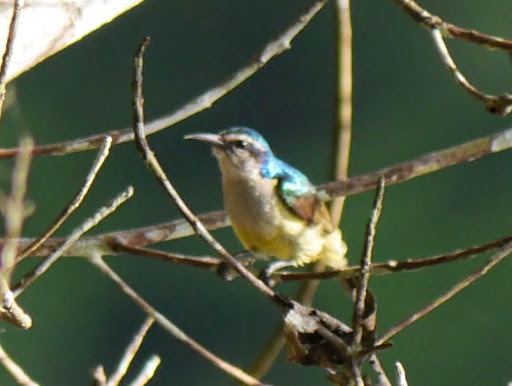

Conservation status
- Least Concern (IUCN 3.1)

Scientific classification
- Kingdom: Animalia
- Phylum: Chordata
- Class: Aves
- Order: Passeriformes
- Family: Nectariniidae
- Genus: Anthreptes
- Species: A. aurantius

Binomial name
- Anthreptes aurantius Verreaux & Verreaux, 1851

Synonyms
- Anthreptes aurantium

= Violet-tailed sunbird =

Species of bird

The violet-tailed sunbird (Anthreptes aurantius) is a species of bird in the family Nectariniidae. It is found near water in forest, scrub and mangrove in the Central African countries of Angola, Cameroon, Central African Republic, Republic of the Congo, Democratic Republic of the Congo, and Gabon. It is part of the violet-backed sunbird superspecies.
