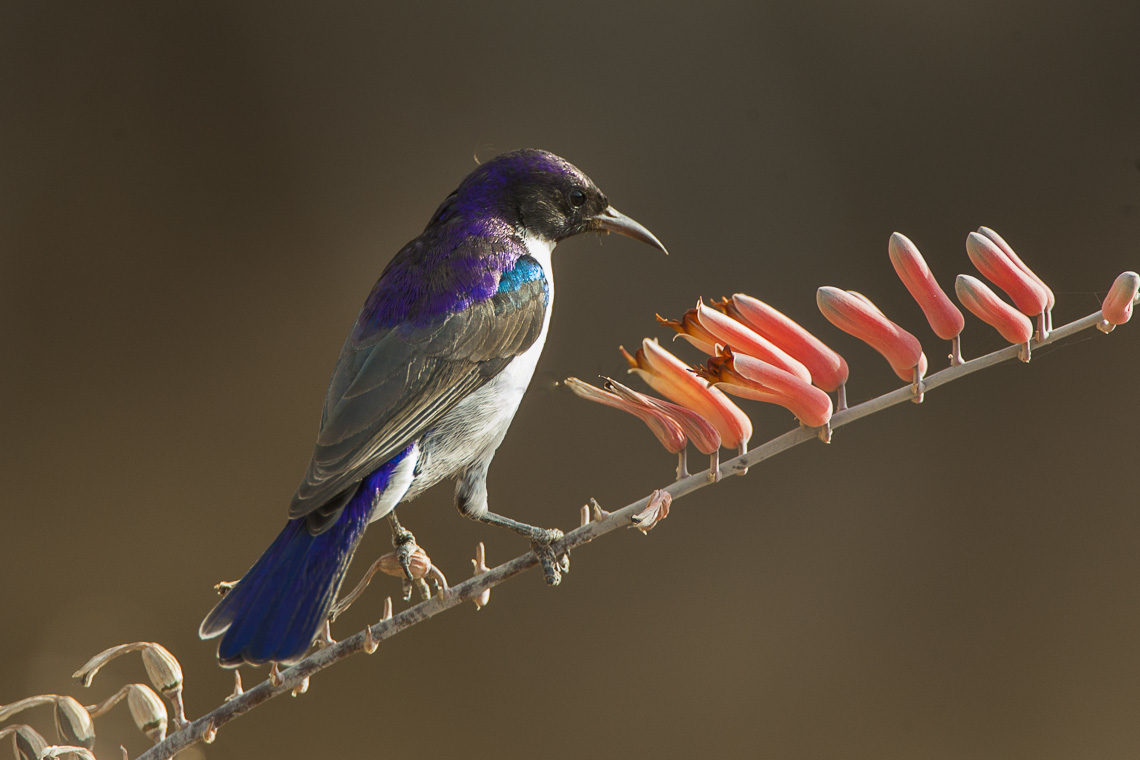

Conservation status
- Least Concern (IUCN 3.1)

Scientific classification
- Kingdom: Animalia
- Phylum: Chordata
- Class: Aves
- Order: Passeriformes
- Family: Nectariniidae
- Genus: Anthreptes
- Species: A. orientalis

Binomial name
- Anthreptes orientalis Hartlaub, 1880

= Eastern violet-backed sunbird =

Species of bird

The eastern violet-backed sunbird (Anthreptes orientalis), also known as the Kenya violet-backed sunbird, is a species of bird in the family Nectariniidae. It is found in arid savanna of East Africa, ranging from Djibouti in north to Tanzania in south. It is part of the violet-backed sunbird superspecies.
