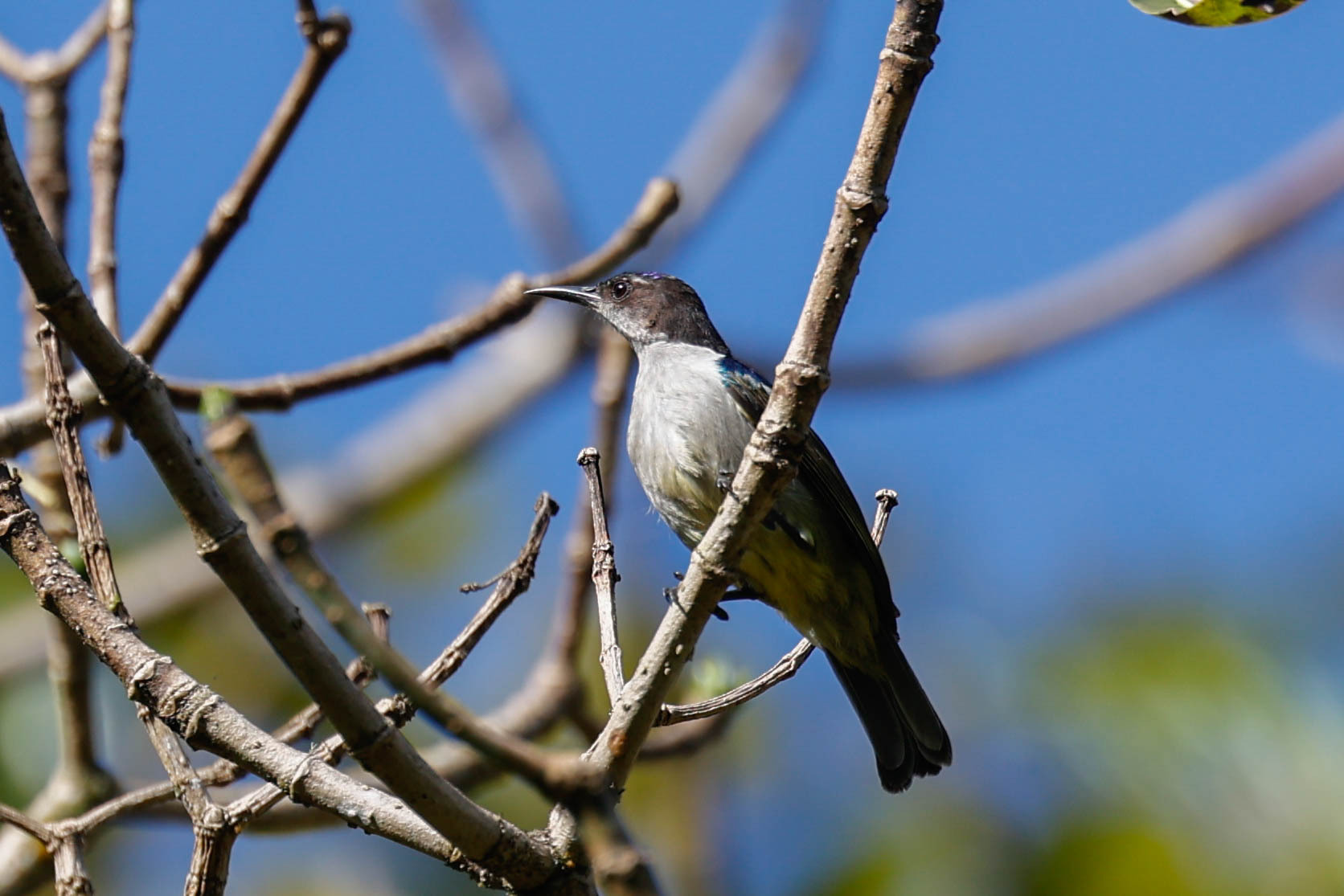

Conservation status
- Least Concern (IUCN 3.1)

Scientific classification
- Kingdom: Animalia
- Phylum: Chordata
- Class: Aves
- Order: Passeriformes
- Family: Nectariniidae
- Genus: Anthreptes
- Species: A. neglectus

Binomial name
- Anthreptes neglectus Neumann, 1922

= Uluguru violet-backed sunbird =

Species of bird

The Uluguru violet-backed sunbird (Anthreptes neglectus) is a species of bird in the family Nectariniidae. The bird is small with a short bill. The male is an iridescent upper body while the female has a brown upperbody. Both have pale-gray underbodies. It is found in forests in eastern Kenya, eastern Tanzania (including the Uluguru Mountains, the basis for its common name) and north-eastern Mozambique. It is part of the violet-backed sunbird superspecies.

In 2024, Anthreptes neglectus is listed as Least Concern.
