= League of Mozambican Women =

- Formation: 1962
- Type: Women's rights
- Location: Mozambique

The League of Mozambican Women, also known by its acronym LIFEMO, was an organization associated with FRELIMO (Mozambique Liberation Front), founded in 1962. Its aim was to support the families of combatants during the war of independence and to spread the principles of the Front. Selina Simango held the presidency and Priscila Gumane the vice-presidency. In addition to participating in the Pan-African Women's Congress, these leaders travelled frequently, establishing a network of support with countries or organizations that collaborated with the struggles for independence in Africa.

However, with the start of the armed conflict in Mozambique, new demands were made. Faced with the need to defend and mobilize the liberated areas, and those still controlled by Portugal, the Destacamento Feminino was created in 1967, a year after the end of LIFEMO. Made up of female guerrillas who had requested military training from the FRELIMO leadership, these combatants occupied territories reserved for men, provoking a revolution in the peasant and conservative areas, delimiting the power and control of men over the productive and reproductive role of women.
