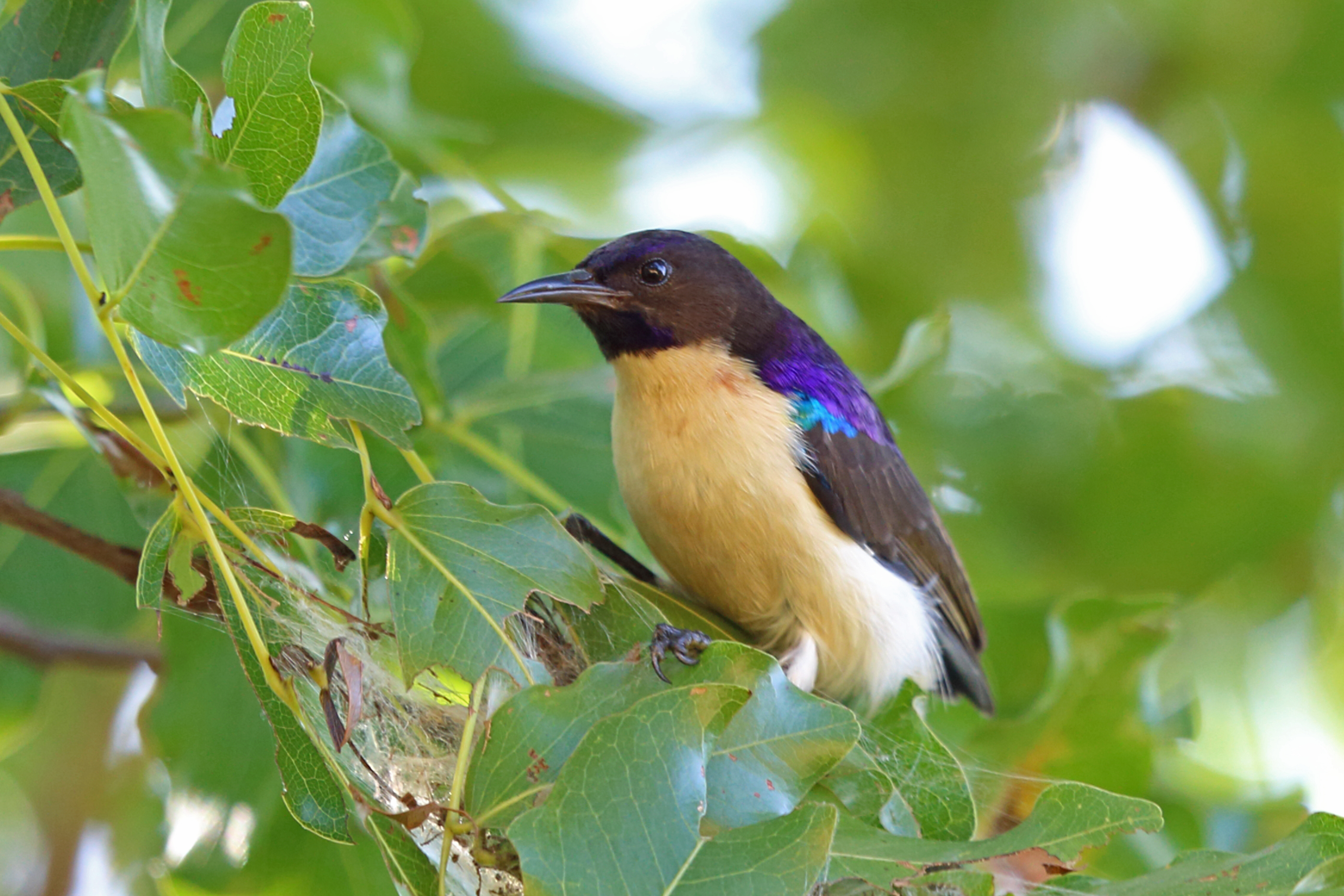

Conservation status
- Least Concern (IUCN 3.1)

Scientific classification
- Kingdom: Animalia
- Phylum: Chordata
- Class: Aves
- Order: Passeriformes
- Family: Nectariniidae
- Genus: Anthreptes
- Species: A. longuemarei

Binomial name
- Anthreptes longuemarei (Lesson, 1831)

= Western violet-backed sunbird =

Species of bird

The western violet-backed sunbird or Longuemare's sunbird (Anthreptes longuemarei) is a species of bird in the family Nectariniidae. It is the most widely ranging species in the violet-backed sunbird superspecies, ranging throughout a large part of tropical mainland sub-Saharan Africa not inhabited by other members of the superspecies. It is mainly found in regions with mesic woodland.
