= Paulina Mateus Nkunda =

Mozambican soldier, feminist, politician

Paulina Mateus Nkunda (1952 – 12 October 2013) was a Mozambican women's activist, veteran of the war of independence and politician who served in positions at the highest levels of FRELIMO.

== Biography ==
Nkunda was born in Muidumbe district, Cabo Delgado province, in 1952. She joined FRELIMO in 1964 and subsequently became part of the Women's Detachment, the organ of FRELIMO's armed forces providing education and military training to women. In July 1968, she participated in FRELIMO's second party congress, held in Matchedje, Niassa. In 1974, Nkunda helped begin military campaigns in Zambezia and headed a group of guerrillas that trained the first women soldiers in Milange district.

After independence, Nkunda was involved in various roles related to women's equality and education. Following the end of the civil war, from 1996 to 2011, she was secretary-general of the Organization of Mozambican Women (OMM). Between 2006 and 2012, she served on the Political Commission of FRELIMO, the party's highest body. She was elected to the Assembly of the Republic in 2009, serving there until her death in 2013.
