= Organization of Mozambican Women =

Mozambican women's right organization

OMM
- Organization of Mozambican Women
- Organização da Mulher Moçambicana
- Formation: March 16, 1973; 53 years ago
- Secretary General: Mariazinha Niquice

The Organization of Mozambican Women (Portuguese: Organização da Mulher Moçambicana OMM) is the women's section of FRELIMO. Founded in 1973, during the Mozambican War of Independence, in recognition of women's growing roles in the conflict against Portuguese colonialism, the OMM was created as a non-military structure to promote women's education, emancipation and mobilization. Following independence in 1975, the OMM focussed on issues related to women's education, ethnic division, divorce, family planning, adultery and promiscuity, prostitution, and alcoholism. In 1990, the OMM voted to separate from FRELIMO, although shortly thereafter, the organization re-affiliated.

== Origins ==
Women's participation in the armed struggle against Portuguese colonialism beginning in the 1960s has been described as "massive" and led to the formation of a women's detachment, Destacamento Feminino, in the People's Forces for the Liberation of Mozambique in 1967.

== Secretaries General ==
- Deolinda Guezimane (1973–1976)
- Salomé Moiane (1977–1990)
- Teresa Tembo (1990–1996)
- Paulina Mateus Nkunda (1996–2011)
- Muania Mussa (2011)
- Amélia Franklin (2011–2013)
- Maria de Fátima Muanza Pelembe (2013–2016)
- Mariazinha Niquice (2016–current)
