= Búzi =

Town on the Buzi River in Mozambique

- Town
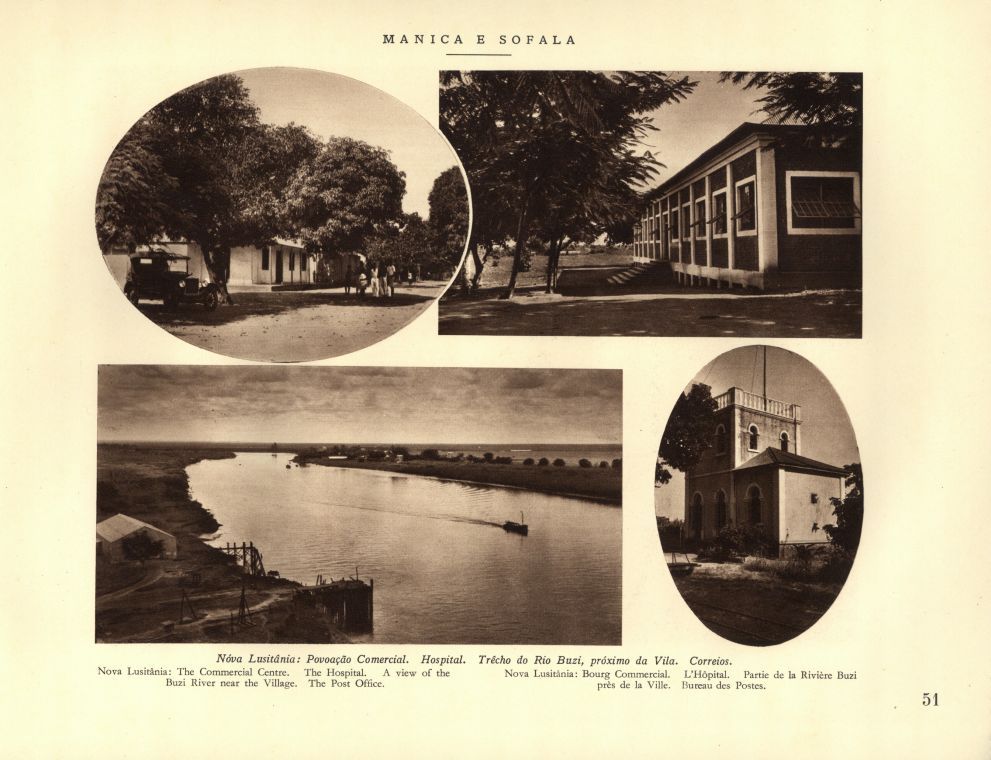
- Views of Búzi – in colonial times Nova Lusitânia – in the 1920s

- Location within Mozambique
- Coordinates: 19°53′03″S 34°35′40″E
- Country: Mozambique
- Province: Sofala
- District: Buzi
- Founder: Portuguese colonizers
- Time zone: UTC+2:00 (CAT)

Buzi (in Portuguese and officially Búzi) is a town on the banks of the Buzi River, in Buzi District, Sofala Province, Mozambique. In colonial times it was known as Nova Lusitânia or Nova Luzitânia. The town was devastated by Cyclone Idai in 2019.

== Economy ==
The economy of Búzi is based on agriculture, sugar production specifically. Production by the Buzi Company was disrupted during the civil war when Renamo forces sabotaged their operations. Since 1994 its 9,000 workers were without work due to the state of disrepair of the machinery. The Buzi Company announced in 2011 that they would restart their sugar production and sugar milling. In 2013 Chinese investors applied to start sugar production by working 600 hectares of irrigation land, and by building a new sugar mill, the fourth in Mozambique.

== Evangelism ==
The Mission of St. António de Baradas and its chapel are situated here. In the 1920s, at nearby Chitikinya, local men who were converted by the South African Compounds and Interior Mission (SACIM), endeavored to organize evangelical communities, but were arrested due to their possession of Zulu and English books. The Portuguese drafted them into the army and they spent four years at Lorenzo Marques, where they received instruction from the Swiss mission, learned Portuguese and received teaching licenses. On their return their evangelical work was renewed, but their school and worship services were closed when the authorities suspected foreign connections. In 1927 they were displaced by the expansion of the Buzi Sugar Company, and joined the Machemeje scheme of the Fairfield Association.
