= Violet-backed sunbird =

Species of bird

The violet-backed sunbird is a superspecies made up of four species of African sunbirds in the genus Anthreptes. They are sexually dimorphic, and the males have glossy purple or blue upperparts and whitish underparts. In their common name, three of the species are differentiated geographically:

- Western violet-backed sunbird (Anthreptes longuemarei): Widely in mainland sub-Saharan Africa.
- Eastern violet-backed sunbird (Anthreptes orientalis): East Africa.
- Uluguru violet-backed sunbird (Anthreptes neglectus): Kenya, Tanzania and Mozambique.
- Violet-tailed sunbird (Anthreptes aurantium): Central Africa.
