= Buzi River (Mozambique) =

River in Mozambique

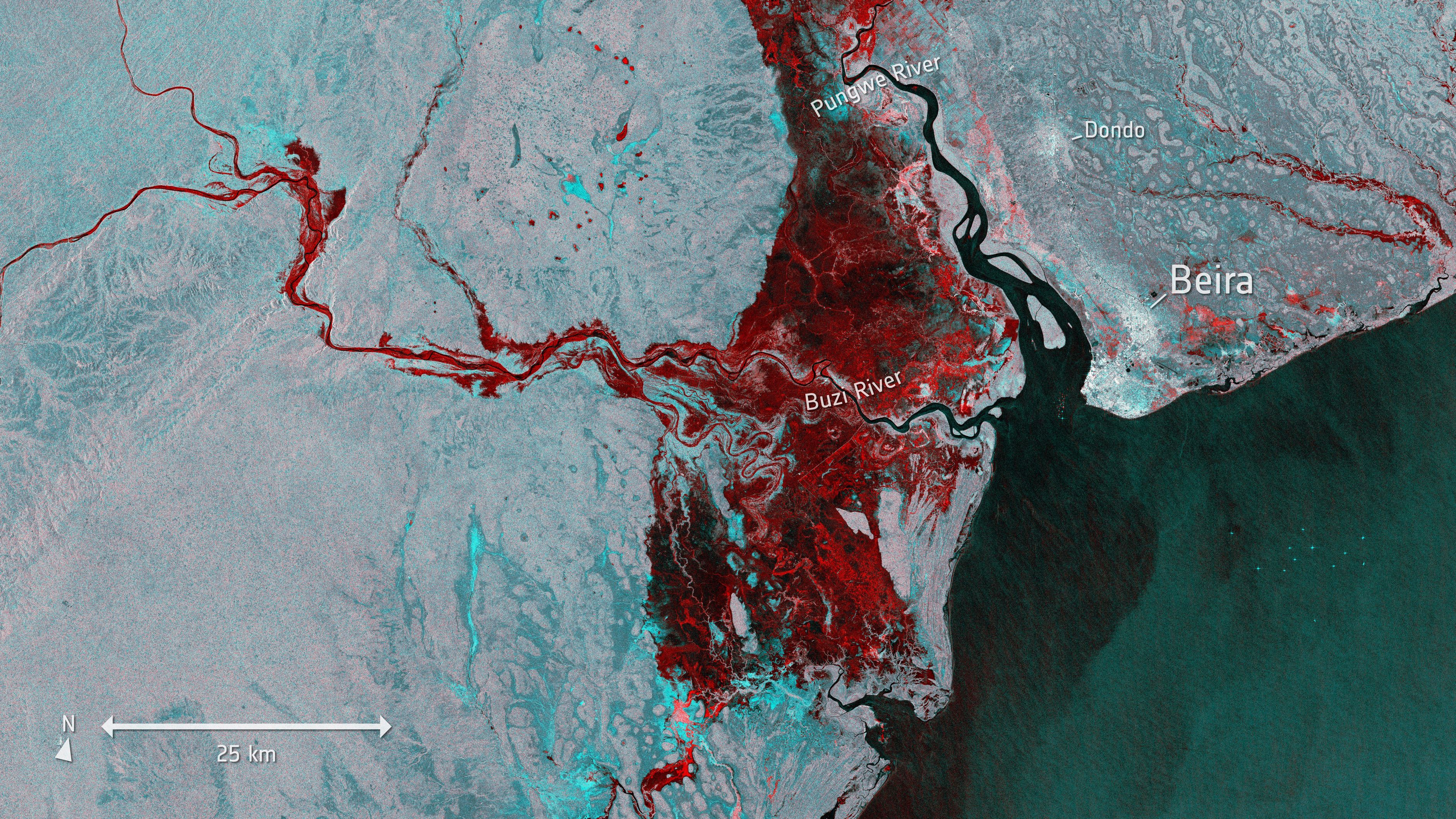
- Buzi River with floods after Cyclone Idai, March 2019
- Native name: Portuguese: Rio Búzi

Location
- Country: Mozambique
- Provinces: Manica and Sofala

Physical characteristics
- Source
  - location: Eastern Highlands
- Mouth: Mozambique Channel
  - coordinates: 19°52′0″S 34°46′0″E
- Length: 374 km (232 mi)
- Basin size: 28,490 km^{2} (11,000 sq mi) to 31,000 km^{2} (12,000 mi^{2})
- Discharge
  - location: Near mouth
  - average: (Period: 1979–2015) 9.49 km^{3}/a (301 m^{3}/s) (Period: 1971–2000)315.4 m^{3}/s (11,140 cu ft/s)

Basin features
- River system: Búzi River
- Tributaries
  - left: Revué, Lucite

Buzi River (Portuguese: Rio Búzi) is a river in Mozambique. The Buzi originates in the Eastern Highlands (or Manica Highlands) on the border of Mozambique and Zimbabwe, and flows eastward through Manica and Sofala provinces of Mozambique. It empties to the Mozambique Channel west of Beira, forming a large estuary with the Pungwe River.

== Geography ==
The Buzi River is 374 km (232 mi) long, with a drainage basin 31,000 km^{2} (12,000 mi^{2}) in size. Its mean annual discharge is 79 m³/s (2,790 cfs) to 315 m^{3}/s (11,100 cu ft/s) at its mouth.

It often causes floods, frequently forming a floodplain together with the larger Pungwe River. Dombé and Búzi are situated on the banks of the river.

== Tributaries ==
The Buzi and its principal tributaries rise in the Eastern Highlands, or Manica Highlands, along the border with Zimbabwe. Some of the Buzi's headwater streams rise in Zimbabwe, and in other places the international border follows the watershed boundary.

The Revué river is the main northern tributary, and its headwaters are in the Eastern Highlands near Machipanda. In 1968, Mozambique's colonial government built the hydroelectric Chicamba Dam across the Revué to create Lake Chicamba.

The Lucite River, known upstream in Zimbabwe as the Rusitu or Lusitu, is the central tributary, joining the Buzi above the Revué.

The Mossurize River joins the Buzi from the southwest, above the Lucite.

The Save River watershed lies west and southwest of the Buzi watershed. The Pungwe watershed lies to the north.
