= Sofala Province =

Province of Mozambique

Coordinates: 19°0′S 34°45′E

Sofala
- Province
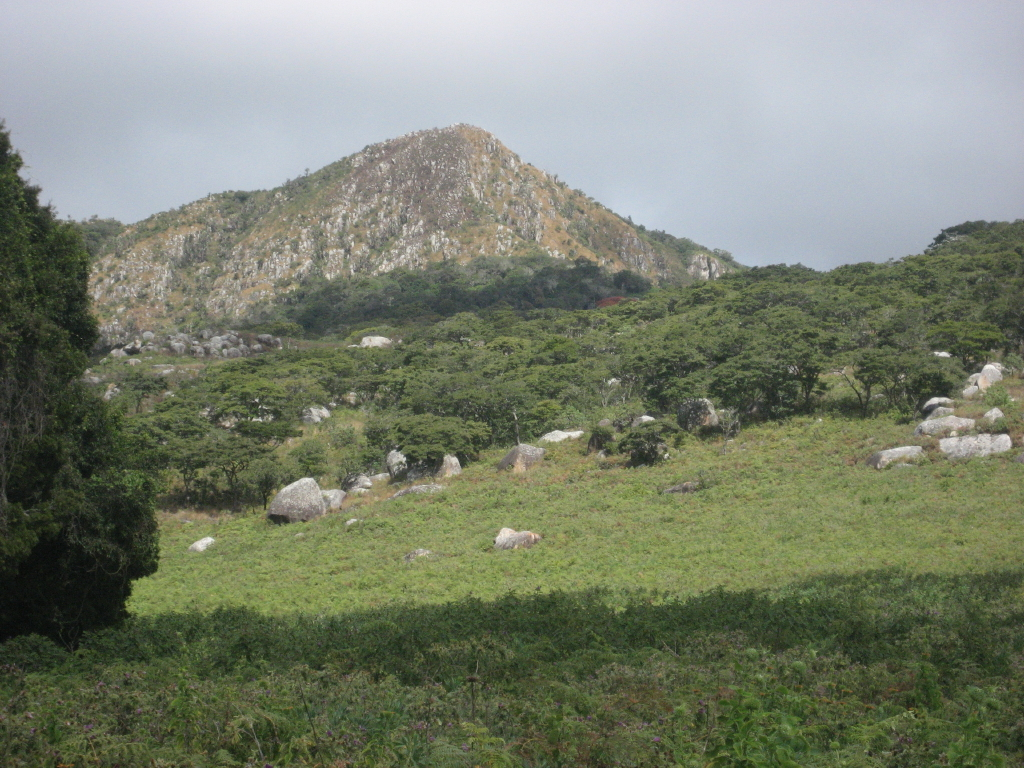
- Gogogo, the highest peak of the Gorongosa mountain complex

- Sofala, Province of Mozambique
- Country: Mozambique
- Capital: Beira

Government
  - Governor: Lourenço Ferreira Bulha

Area
  - Total: 68,018 km^{2} (26,262 sq mi)

Population (2017 census)
  - Total: 2,259,248
  - Density: 33.215/km^{2} (86.028/sq mi)
- Postal code: 21xx
- Area code: (+258) 23
- HDI (2019): 0.482 low · 4th of 11
- Website: www.sofala.gov.mz

Sofala [suˈfalɐ] is a province of Mozambique. It has a population of 2,259,248 (2017 census). Beira is the capital of the province, named for the ruined port of Sofala which is 35 kilometres (22 mi) to the south.

== History ==
Portuguese landholder and imperialist Joaquim Carlos Paiva de Andrada established a base at the river mouth at what is now Beira in 1884.

Sofala Province is one of the strongholds of the RENAMO. In late 1978 RENAMO guerrillas were "ranging into Sofala Province and launching attacks along the Beira–Chimoio road and rail line, the Dondo–Inhaminga corridor". Some of the more scarcely populated areas of the province are affected by landmines; defensive rings around villages were still common in some rural areas according to mid 1990s reports by Oxfam.

In March 2019, the province was severely affected by Cyclone Idai, with its capital city of Beira being largely destroyed. The flooding resulting from this storm was widespread throughout the province and the rest of Central Mozambique.

== Demographics ==
Historical population
Year	Pop.	±% p.a.
1980	1,065,200	—
1997	1,368,671	+1.49%
2007	1,685,663	+2.11%
2017	2,259,248	+2.97%

== Geography ==
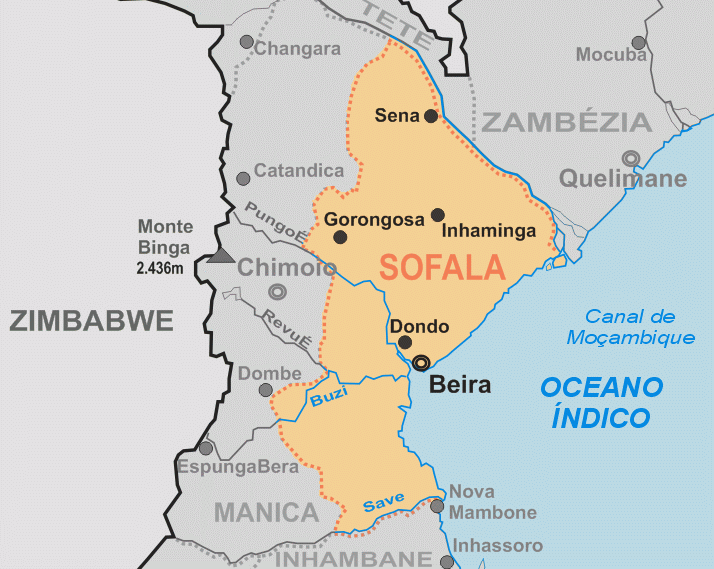
Provincial map

Sofala Province, in central-eastern Mozambique, covers an area of 68,018 square kilometres (26,262 sq mi). The province is bordered to the north by Tete Province, to the northeast by Zambezia Province, to the south by Inhambane Province, and to the west by Manica Province. Rivers flowing through the province include the Chiveve River, the Buzi River, the Save River, which flows along the Inhambane provincial border, and the Púnguè River, which flows into the sea at Beira. On the Urema River, a tributary of the Púnguè, the river forms the lagoon which are home to hundreds of hippopotamus. The valleys of the province are subject to flooding; in late January 2012, unusually heavy rain caused widespread flooding along the banks of the Púnguè and the Save, and other major rivers in Africa such as the Zambezi and Limpopo, leading over 100,000 people in total to be evacuated.

Gorongosa National Park, at the southern end of the Great African Rift Valley, covers several thousand square kilometres, including the valley floor and parts of surrounding forested plateaus, which contain miombo and montane forests. The park contains the 1,863 metres (6,112 ft) Mount Gorongosa, a mountain which is considered sacred to the people of the country. On the eastern slope of the mountain is a number of vegetation zones according to elevation, and there are numerous limestone caves in the vicinity.

=== Districts ===
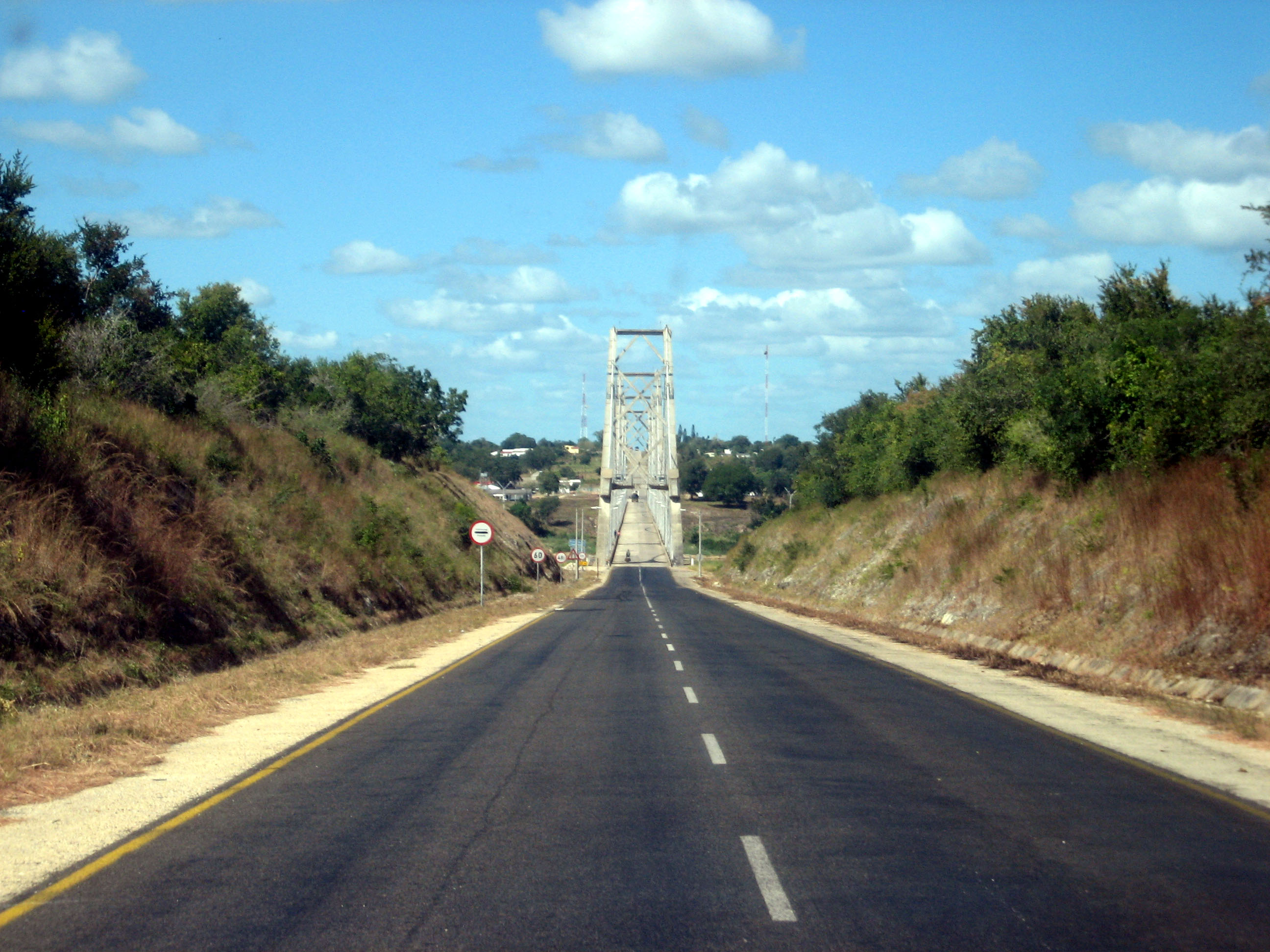
EN1 road crossing Save river, Inhambane/Sofala, Mozambique

Sofala Province is divided into 13 districts:

- Beira District
- Buzi District
- Caia District
- Chemba District
- Cheringoma District
- Chibabava District
- Dondo District
- Gorongosa District
- Marromeu District
- Machanga District
- Maringué District
- Muanza District
- Nhamatanda District

== Economy ==
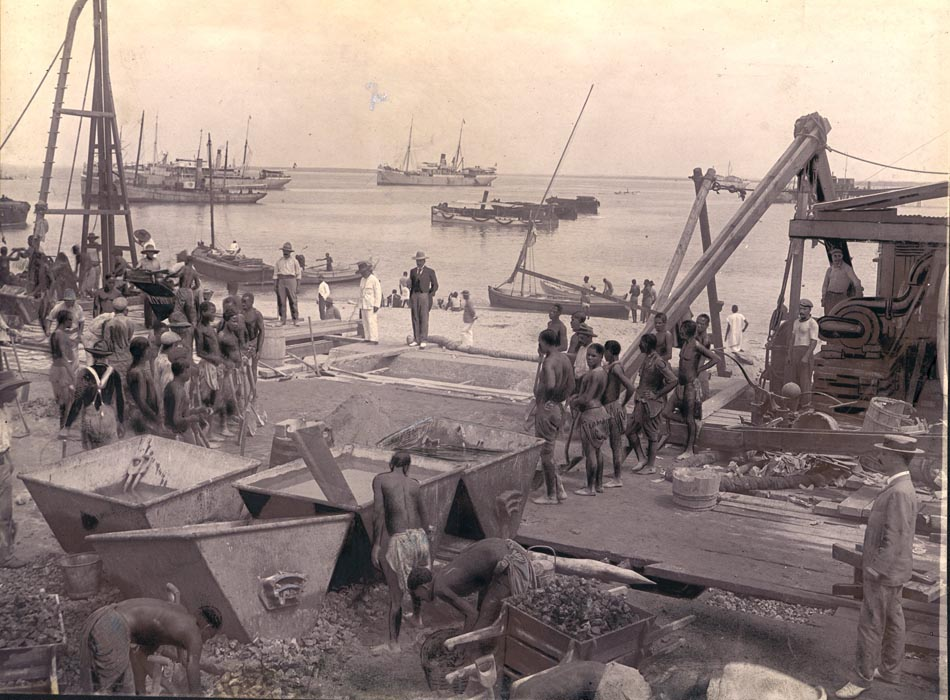
Port of Beira in 1902

The city of Beira, the provincial capital and Mozambique's second-largest city and the busiest port in the country, plays a key role in the local economy. Principal exports include ores, tobacco, food products, cotton, hides and skins, with the chief imports including fertilizers, equipment and textiles, liquid fuels and wheat. The Mozambique Company had their headquarters in Beira, during the building of the railway across the country. Many buildings remain from the colonial period, it is "as famed for its seafood as for its tawdry nightlife". The Makuti Lighthouse of Beira was built in 1904. The oil trade has been important to the regional economy, with Beira connected by pipeline to Zimbabwe in 1960. The port of Beira is crucial for the trade in oil involving Zimbabwe, Malawi, Zambia and Congo. In the 21st century, agricultural productivity in the province has shown significant improvement, reducing poverty. The Austrian Development Cooperation has played a major role in investment in the province.
