= Charles Francis Massy Swynnerton =

British naturalist (1877–1938)

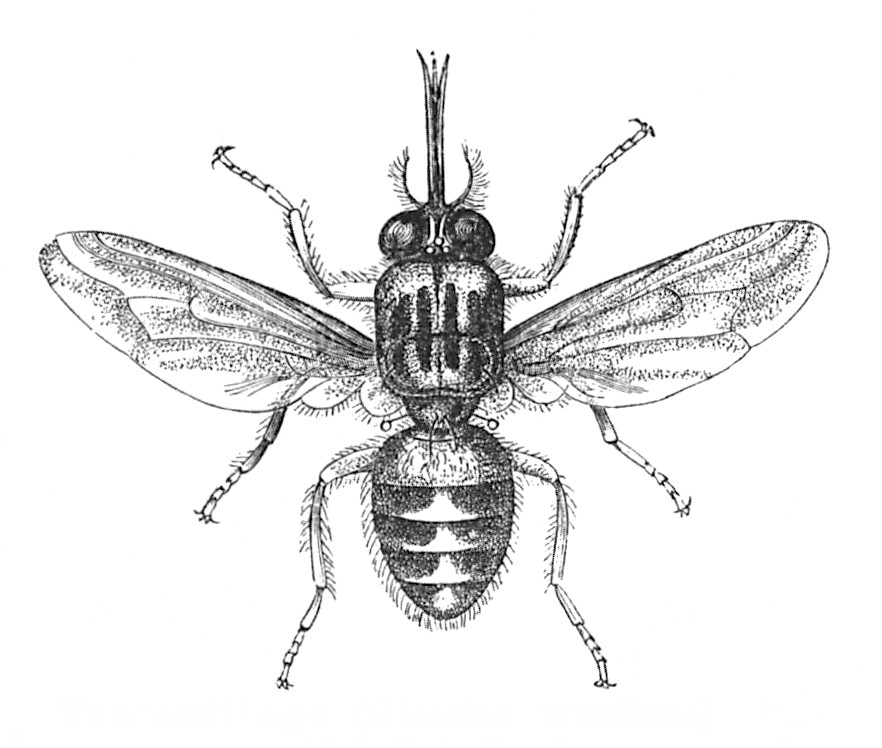

Charles Francis Massy Swynnerton CMG (3 December 1877 – 8 June 1938) was an English naturalist noted for his contributions to tsetse fly research.

Swynnerton was born in Folkestone, Kent on 3 December 1877. His father was a senior chaplain in the Indian Army, and his mother the daughter of Major W. H. Massy, of Grantstown Hall, County Tipperary. Swynnerton spent his early years in India, returning to England to start his schooling at Lancing College in Sussex. In 1897 he was accepted at Oxford University, but emigrated to Africa instead.

In Natal he met the renowned entomologist and authority on Curculionidae, Guy Anstruther Knox Marshall (1871–1959), who owned some farms in Southern Rhodesia and persuaded Swynnerton to manage one of these in the Melsetter district. In 1900 he became manager of Gungunyana Farm close to the Chirinda Forest in the Chipinga District - this farm was also bought by Guy Marshall in 1902. Despite his lack of formal scientific education he began a career which would end with serious international recognition as an entomologist. For the following 19 years Swynnerton used the farm as a base and worked on comprehensive collections of plants, birds and insects, the plants being written up later in 1911 in J. Linn. Soc. (Bot.) 40:1-245 as Flora of Gazaland. The British Museum was a regular recipient of his plant and insect specimens which were lauded for displaying "a precision in localisation and notes on economic uses which made this collection a model one". He was elected a Fellow of the Linnaean Society in 1907. From the farm he made a number of collecting trips to the nearby Chimanimani Mountains. During this period Guy Marshall became chief editor of the Bulletin of Entomological Research and remained a close friend and mentor to Swynnerton.

He was primarily interested in the ecological interactions of the tsetse fly (Glossina). The Rhodesian government appointed him in 1918 to research the tsetse fly problem, later that year extending his brief to also cover Mozambique. In 1919 he was appointed as the first game warden of Tanganyika, again with a brief to investigate the tsetse situation, becoming the first director of Tanganyika's tsetse control department, and Director of Tsetse Research at Shinyanga ten years later. His career trajectory resembles that of Clement Gillman, also known for east African field work.

In 1937 he was awarded the Order of St Michael and St George. However, on 8 June 1938, on his way to receiving the award, he died in a de Havilland Leopard Moth plane crash near Mjari in Tanganyika. His obituary in Nature was penned by Sir Guy Marshall.

== Patronymic taxa ==
Swynnerton is commemorated by the genus Swynnertonia (Swynnerton's robin) and in some 40 specific plant names, as well as bird and insect names. Also, a species of African worm lizard, Chirindia swynnertoni, the cichlid Astatotilapia swynnertoni, and Glossina swynnertoni are named in his honour.

== Works ==
- 1911 Flora of Gazaland - Linnaean Society
- Swynnerton, C.F.M. (1936). The Tsetse Flies of East Africa: a First Study of their Ecology, with a View to their Control. Royal Entomological Society. pp. xxxvi + 579 + 22 plates + 7 maps. ASIN B000ZR8PVO.
- Vernacular Names of East African Mammals - edited by C.F.M. Swynnerton, Transactions of the Royal Entomological Society of London, 84, p. 547-552
