= Ndau witchcraft and sorcery =

Belief system

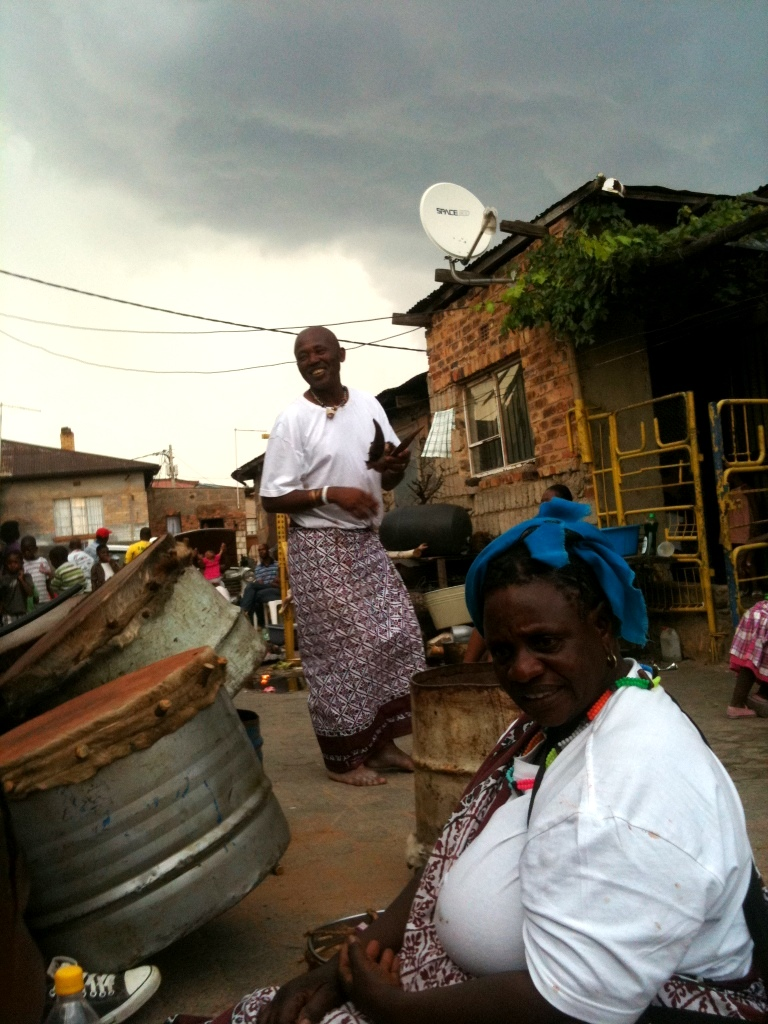
Senior n'anga (Shangaan Traditional Healers) celebrate at an initiation dedicated to the Ndau spirit.

The Ndau people of Mozambique and Zimbabwe have a complex and active system of beliefs in the supernatural, magic, and spiritual phenomena that continues to influence social interactions, in spite of the significant role of churches in modern-day Mozambique and Zimbabwe. In practical terms, they do not distinguish between witchcraft and sorcery but believe that the spirits of the dead interact with living people and can be persuaded or compelled to help or harm by prayer, magic, or offerings. A witch (muroyi, literally "killer") can manipulate spirits to harm others, although certain spirits are malevolent by nature. Traditional healers known as n'anga (sometimes written nganga or nyanga) are believed to have magical powers, can harm or heal ordinary people and can communicate with spirits.

== History ==
The Ndau have occupied land in central Mozambique and southeastern Zimbabwe for several centuries. In the early 19th century, during a period of severe drought, northern Nguni armies conquered much of this area, under the leadership of Nxaba Msane, who established a short-lived kingdom inland from Sofala. In 1837 he was defeated by Soshangane, a powerful Nguni rival. The Nguni-Shangaans established the Gaza Empire in southern Mozambique, and intermarriages between the Nguni and Ndau led to cultural and linguistic changes. With the expansion of Portuguese control in the Zambezi Valley, the African chieftaincies of the Zambezi region gave way to warlords who raised private armies and raided for slaves in the interior. The most powerful of these warlords was Manuel António de Sousa, also known as Gouveia, a settler from Portuguese India, who by the middle of the 19th century controlled most of the southern Zambezi Valley.

The Ndau adopted some aspects of Portuguese colonial culture and were largely converted to Catholicism by missionaries. From 1931, young Ndau speakers began to gradually accept Shona as their primary identity. However, Ndau’s constitutional recognition as a separate official language in 2013 contributed to the rejuvenation of the ChiNdau identity in Zimbabwe. The Ndau people are known for their mastery of herbal medicine, and they are openly described by Mozambicans to be formidable black magicians.

== Benevolent spirits ==
Spirits are perceived as good when they protect, assist and heal. Good spirits are worshipped and given offerings, most commonly beer, but offerings include food, clothing, other gifts, and in the past, even women or girls, who would become "spirit wives". The most prominent good spirits are family ancestral spirits known as mudzimu (pl. vadzimu). Vadzimu can enter the body of a member of the same family and then use that individual to communicate with living persons. Once possessed by a mudzimu, a person usually becomes an n'anga dedicated to help, protect and provide support for members of that family.

Mashavi (sing. shavi) are the spirits of strangers who have died away from home, or the spirits of young, unmarried individuals who have not had a proper funeral and therefore wander around restlessly. Because they have no living descendants, they take possession of unrelated persons, either n'anga or ordinary people. A person may be possessed by more than one mashavi. There are several kinds of mashavi, including mermaid-like water spirits (nzuzu) who inhabit streams, wells or lakes. Zvipunha are rain spirits, to whom people pray for rain to cultivate crops and gardens. Madzviti are the spirits of dead warriors. Zvirombo are the spirits of animals, and those possessed by them will, at times, behave like that particular animal. Mashavi are beneficial but not as powerful as mudzimu, and their power diminishes over time. Rarely, a shavi can be harmful or destructive, as can mudzimu if not worshipped and honored appropriately with offerings.

== Malevolent spirits ==
Evil spirits fall into three main categories. The most common and most dangerous are ngozi, spirits of murdered people who return for vengeance on those who committed the murder or assisted in it. An ngozi may reveal a murder when none was suspected. Less commonly, an ngozi can be called up by an n'anga seeking to harm others. In rare cases, an ngozi seeks to correct bad behavior in his or her descendents. An ngozi may sometimes demand compensation in the form of beer, money, or other offerings. If the ngozi is the result of a murder, killing the murderer will cause the ngozi to disappear.

A bvuri (literally "shadow," pl. mabvuri) is the name given to an evil spirit employed by a witch to harm others. Mabvuri can possess a victim and cause them to harm others, damage property, or just create confusion and distress. A mhepo (literally "evil wind") is a breeze conjured by a witch to send a bvuri to harm or kill a specific person. The witch burns a concoction of herbal medicines and uses a mirror to send the mhepo which carries the bvuri towards its victim.

Madzvoka or madzoca are ancestor spirits from the distant past, who are unpredictable and can inflict harm on people. This is sometimes explained by the fact that these ancestor spirits have been forgotten, and no one actively worships them or provides offerings to them. Epidemics and natural disasters are sometimes attributed to angry madzvoka.

== Ndau sorcerers (n'anga) ==
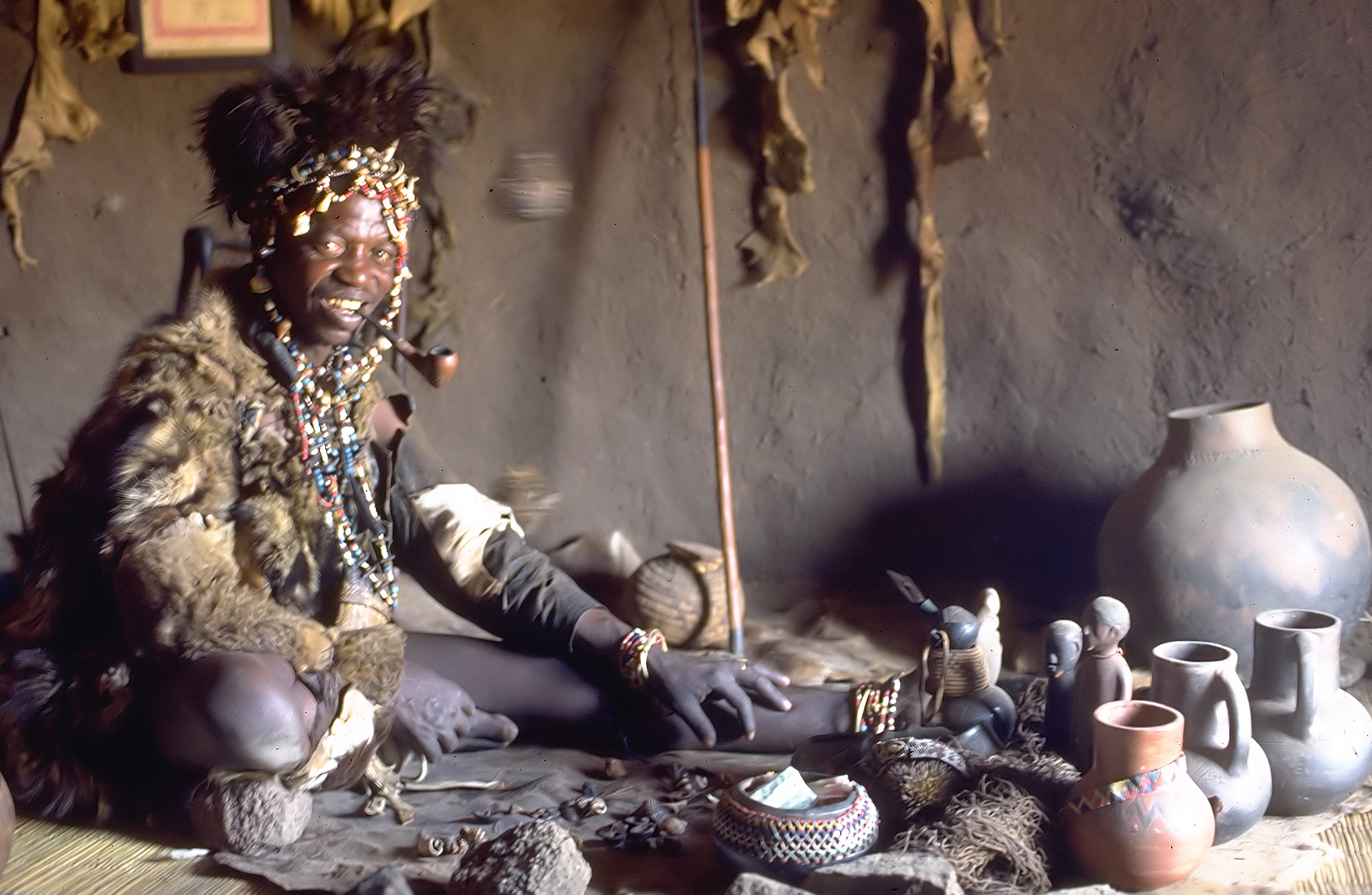
A n'anga in central Zimbabwe.

N'anga are traditional healers and herbalists who also communicate with spirits and can heal or harm people using traditional medicine (mushonga). The most powerful n'anga are possessed by ancestor spirits (vadzimu), and lesser n'anga are possessed by mashavi. Each family has its own n'anga possessed by that family's ancestor spirit. N'anga can be male or female, more often female, and all n'anga are believed to be capable of helping people or harming them. When asked to resolve a case of spirit aggression, the n'anga must first determine the nature of the spirit, and whether it was sent by a witch or another n'anga. A n'anga can appease an ngozi with offerings, or destroy it by killing the person who killed its human predecessor. A n'anga can capture a bvuri and trap it inside an animal or money. The bvuri can then possess anyone who eats the possessed animal, or anyone who tries to take or spend the cursed money. N'anga can also determine who sent the bvuri and enact counter-sorcery against them. N'anga are often called upon by communities to manipulate the weather, particularly during droughts or floods, by appealing to the zvipunha rain spirits. N'anga practice divination by inviting madzvoka to possess them, thus allowing the n'anga to perceive remote places and events. Using this technique, n'anga can determine the perpetrator of a crime, locate lost people or objects, and discover if a person is lying or telling the truth.

== Ndau sorcery in modern times ==
The Ndau do not consider beliefs in magic, witchcraft and sorcery to be incompatible with belief in modern science. N'anga often claim that they can manipulate bacteria and viruses, and that mabvuri and ngozi can do this too. Many n'anga specialize in the treatment of certain problems or illnesses, and it is not uncommon for a n'anga to refer a patient to another n'anga or to a clinic or hospital in cases where the initial treatment was unsuccessful.

== See also ==
- Ndau people
- Witchcraft in Africa
- African traditional medicine
- Traditional healers of Southern Africa
