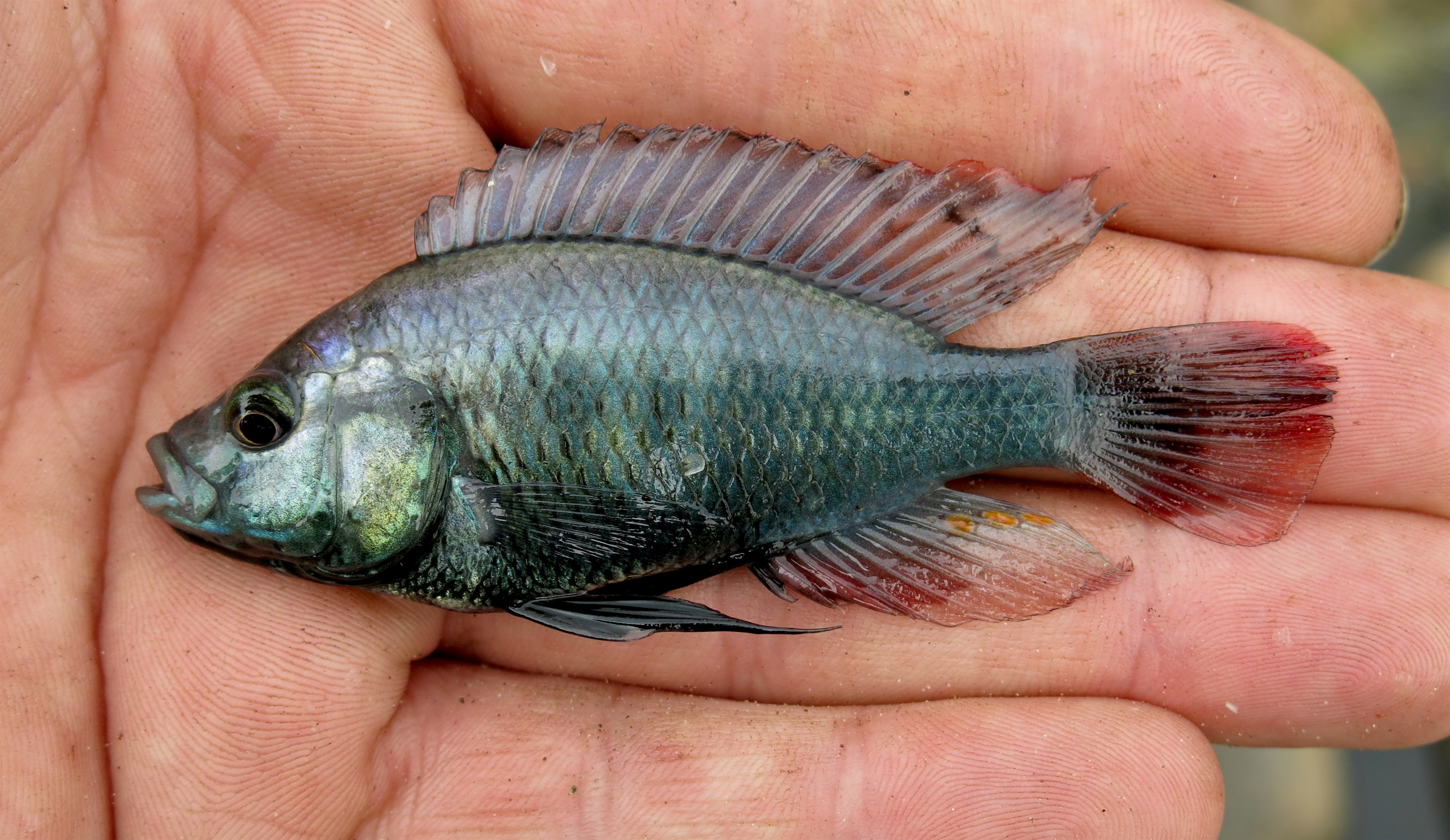
- Astatotilapia stappersii

Scientific classification
- Kingdom: Animalia
- Phylum: Chordata
- Class: Actinopterygii
- Division: Teleostei
- Order: Cichliformes
- Family: Cichlidae
- Tribe: Haplochromini
- Genus: Astatotilapia; Pellegrin, 1904

Type species
- Sparus desfontainii Lacépède, 1802

= Astatotilapia =

Genus of fishes

Astatotilapia is a genus of small freshwater fish in the family Cichlidae found in Eastern and Northern Africa, with a single species, A. flaviijosephi, in Western Asia (the only non-African haplochromine). Many species have been moved between this genus and Haplochromis, and while some consensus has been reached in recent years, their mutual delimitation is still far from settled. Based on mtDNA, Astatotilapia as currently defined is polyphyletic.

== Species ==
There are currently 9 recognized species in this genus:

- Astatotilapia bloyeti (Sauvage, 1883) (Bloyet's haplo)
- Astatotilapia burtoni (Günther, 1894)
- Astatotilapia calliptera (Günther, 1894) (Eastern happy)
- Astatotilapia desfontainii (Lacépède, 1802)
- Astatotilapia flaviijosephi (Lortet, 1883) (Jordan mouthbrooder)
- Astatotilapia stappersii (Poll, 1943)
- Astatotilapia swynnertoni (Boulenger, 1907)
- Astatotilapia tchadensis Trape, 2016
- Astatotilapia tweddlei P. B. N. Jackson, 1985

There are a few possibly undescribed species in the genus, such as:

- Astatotilapia sp. 'dwarf bigeye scraper'
- Astatotilapia sp. 'shovelmouth'

Names brought to synonymy

- Astatotilapia elegans (Trewavas, 1933), a synonym for Haplochromis elegans
