= Astatotilapia sp. 'dwarf bigeye scraper' =

Conservation status
- Critically Endangered (IUCN 2.3)

Scientific classification
- Kingdom: Animalia
- Phylum: Chordata
- Class: Actinopterygii
- Order: Cichliformes
- Family: Cichlidae
- Tribe: Haplochromini
- Genus: Astatotilapia
- Species: A. sp. 'dwarf bigeye scraper'

Binomial name
- Astatotilapia sp. 'dwarf bigeye scraper'

Species of fish

Astatotilapia sp. 'dwarf bigeye scraper' is a putative, undescribed species of fish in the family Cichlidae. It is endemic to Kenya, where it is found in Lake Kanyaboli. It was listed as critically endangered in the 1996-2006 IUCN Red List of Threatened Species, but not mentioned in the most recent versions.
