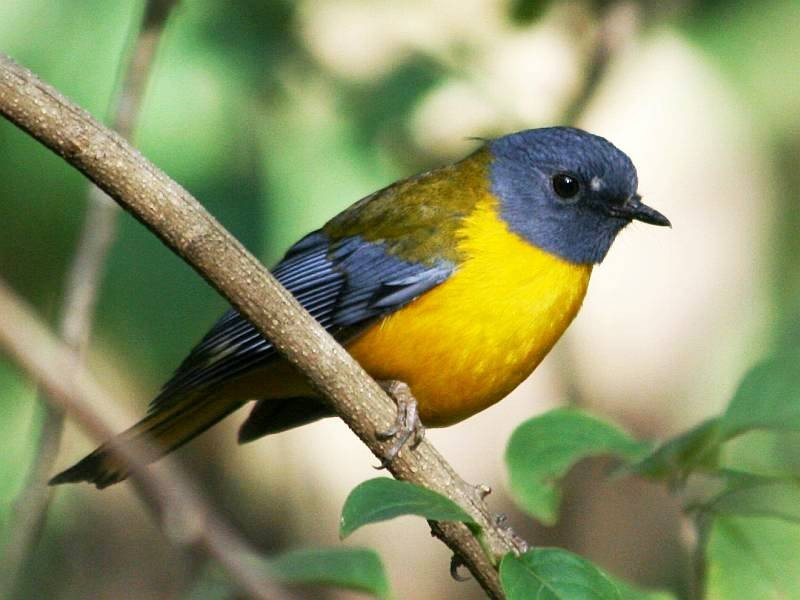
- Nominate race

Conservation status
- Least Concern (IUCN 3.1)

Scientific classification
- Kingdom: Animalia
- Phylum: Chordata
- Class: Aves
- Order: Passeriformes
- Family: Muscicapidae
- Genus: Pogonocichla; Cabanis, 1847
- Species: P. stellata

Binomial name
- Pogonocichla stellata (Vieillot, 1818)
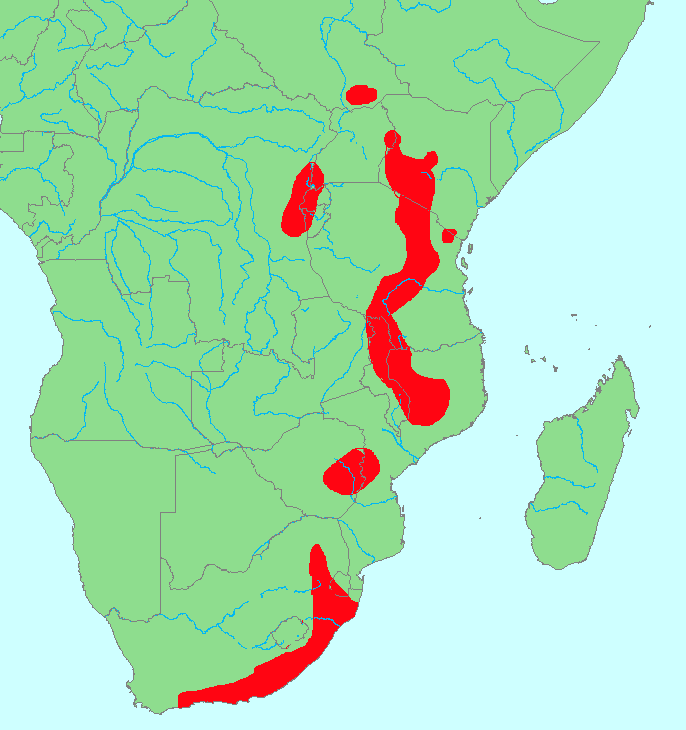
- approximate distribution

= White-starred robin =

Species of bird

The white-starred robin (Pogonocichla stellata) is a species of bird in the Old World flycatcher and chat family Muscicapidae. It is also sometimes more simply called the starred robin. It is monotypic within the genus Pogonocichla. There are around twelve subspecies. The species is found in East and southern Africa. It occurs in forested areas in the Afromontane of sub-Saharan Africa. It is a brightly coloured robin with a bright yellow breast and belly, a slate coloured head with spots on the eyes and throat and blueish wings.

The white-starred robin gives a range of calls that vary geographically. The diet is dominated by insects, although some fruit is taken as well. It is a territorial and seasonal breeder that lays up to three eggs in a domed nest. The generic name Pogoncichla is derived from the Greek pogon for beard, a reference to the white spots on the throat and face, and kikhle for thrush. Similarly the specific name stellata and the species' common name are also derived from the facial spots.

== Taxonomy ==
The white-starred robin is related to the chats, subfamily Saxicolinae, a group formerly placed with the thrush family Turdidae, but now placed in the Old World flycatcher family Muscicapidae. Its position within the family is somewhat uncertain; along with three other monotypic African robin genera it is thought to have affinities with the robin-chats in the genus Cossypha, and it is sometimes placed close to the Swynnerton's robin (Swynnertonia). The taxonomy within the species is highly complex, as across its range it has some subspecies with intermediate plumages between juveniles and adults, and in some not. There are also different songs across the subspecies and in particular two types of pipping call which have a patchwork distribution across the range and between the subspecies.

At present twelve subspecies are recognised:

- Pogonocichla stellata stellata (Vieillot, 1818) is found in eastern and southern South Africa
- P. s. transvaalensis (Roberts, 1912) is found in northern South Africa
- P. s. chirindensis (Roberts, 1914) is found in East Zimbabwe
- P. s. hygrica (Clancey, 1969) is found in west Mozambique.
- P. s. orientalis (G.A. Fischer & Reinchenow, 1884) in west, east and south Tanzania, Malawi and Mozambique
- P. s. guttifer (Reinchenow & Neumann, 1895), Mount Kilimanjaro, Tanzania
- P. s. helleri (Mearns, 1913), Taita Hills, Kenya, and north-east Tanzania
- P. s. macarthuri (van Someren, 1939), Chyulu Hills, Kenya
- P. s. intensa (Sharpe, 1901), north and central Kenya and north Tanzania
- P. s. elgonensis (Ogilvie-Grant, 1911), Mount Elgon, Kenya and Uganda
- P.s. ruwenzorii (Ogilvie-Grant, 1906), north-east Democratic Republic of the Congo, south west Uganda, west Rwanda and Burundi
- P. s. pallidiflava (Cunningham-van Someren & Schifter, 1981), Imatong Mountains, South Sudan

Several other races have been described; friedmanni, which is synonymised with ruwenzorii, lebombo, from the border of South Africa and Eswatini, which is synonymised with transvaalensis, and margaritata, which is synonymised with the nominate race. In Bowie's 2006 study of the genetics of the northern subspecies intensa and pallidiflava were treated as a single subspecies, keniensis.

== Description ==
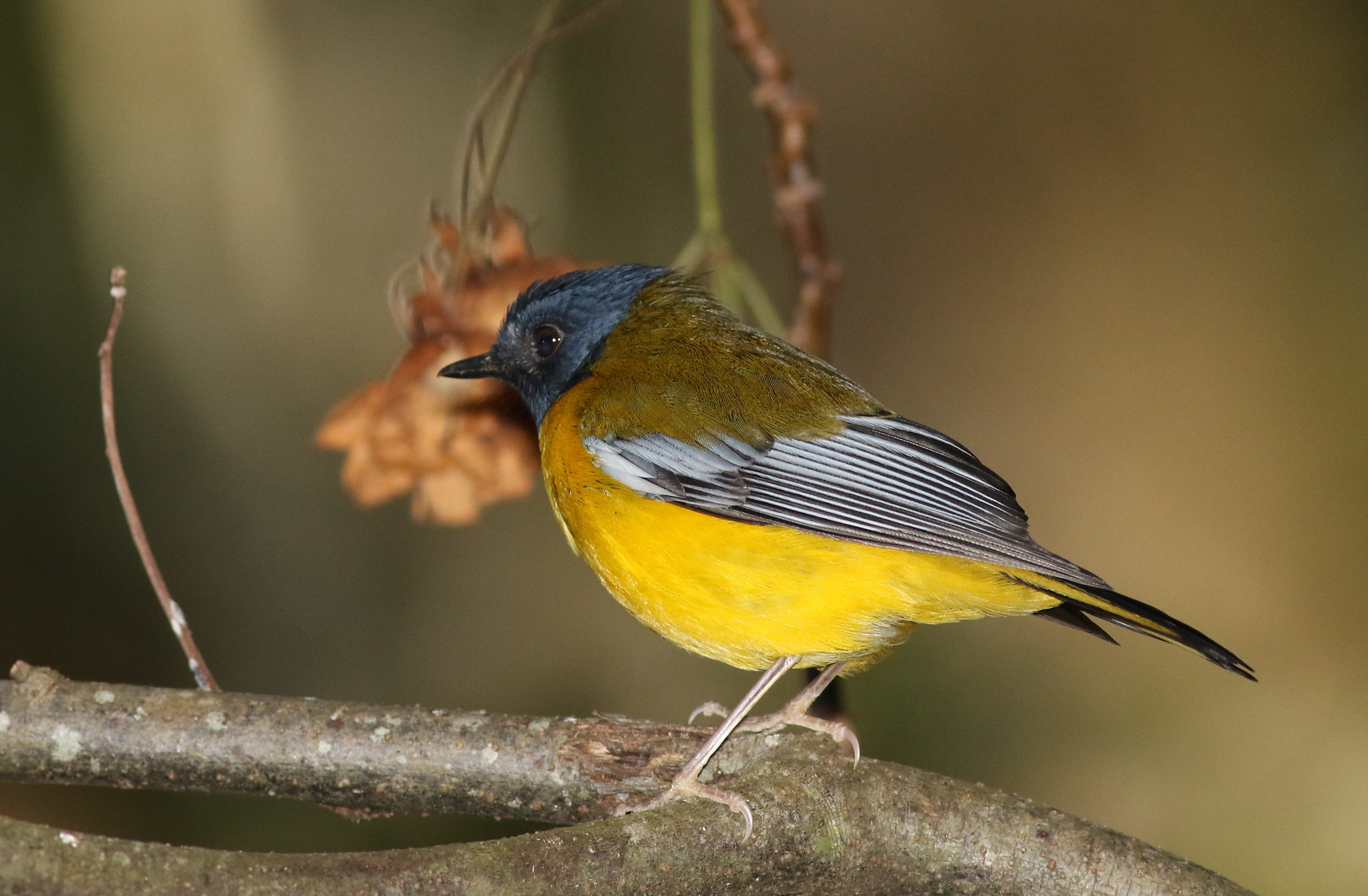
P. s. chirindensis in Zimbabwe

The white-starred robin is a small robin, 15 to 16 cm (5.9–6.3 in) in length and weighing between 18 and 25 g (0.63–0.88 oz), with the females being slightly smaller than the males. The plumage of the nominate race is slate-grey on the head, with a white spot in front of each eye and another small one on the throat. The mantle and part of the wings are green (moss-green in the mantle, olive-green on the wings), the rest of the wings are bluish grey, and the tail is black with yellow lateral stripes. The breast and belly are bright yellow, and the legs are pinkish. The plumage of both sexes are alike. The bill is broad and black, and unlike other robin species, is surrounded by well-developed rictal bristles used in flycatching. Juvenile birds are blackish-brown above with golden flecks, and yellow with brown scaling below. The nominate race has a sub-adult plumage, which is dusky olive above, yellow breast and belly, with grey streaks, and the tail is as adult but brownish instead of black. This sub-adult plumage is retained for up to two years.

The race pallidiflava is as the nominate, but with a paler yellow on the breast and belly. intensa is quite different, with a bronze-washed back, a yellow rump and slate edges on the flight feathers. The race ruwenzori is like intensa but with a deeper yellow on the breast. The race elgonensis is as nominate but with an all black tail, the subadult of this species has some yellow on the tail, macarthuri is more pale below and has a deeper greenish-olive back. The race helleri has a green back and yellow rump, whereas the rump of orientalis is green, as well as having greyish wings and more greenish yellow-upper wings. The race hygrica is as nominate but with a saturated moss-green back, and the race transvaalensis is as hygrica but more orange yellow below and with a silvery edge to the flight feathers, finally chirindensis is brighter yellow-green on the back.

== Habitat ==
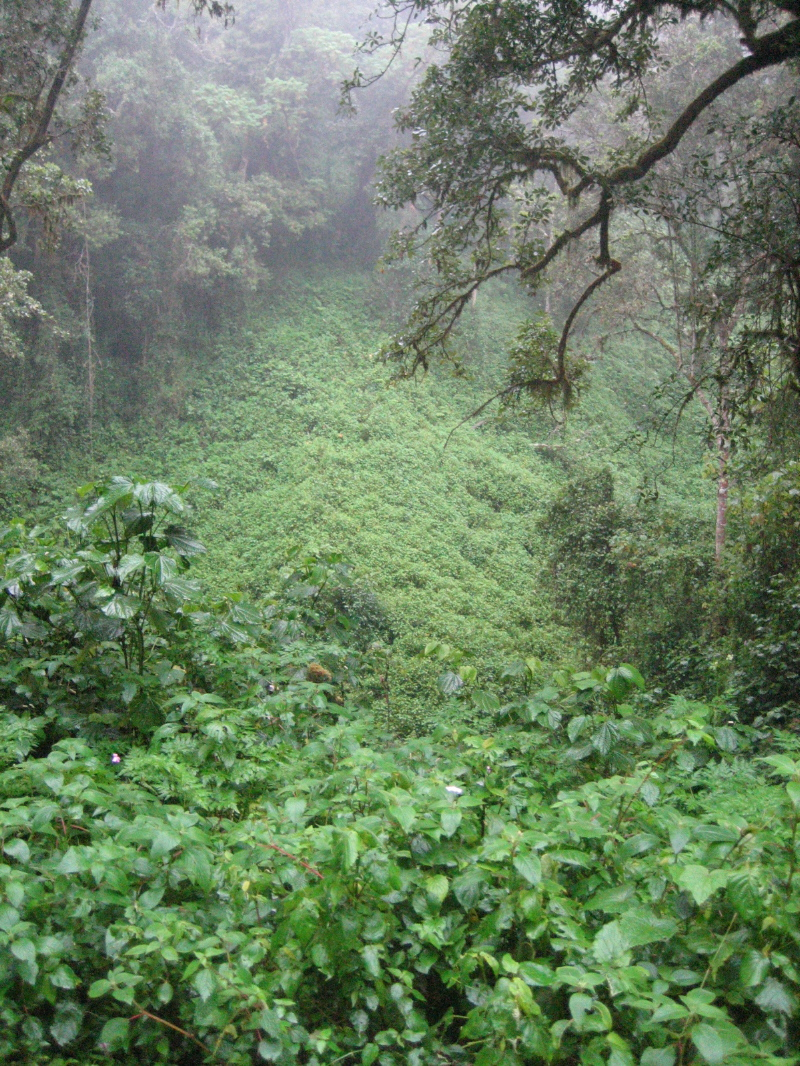
Moist forest and forest edge is the principal habitat. This forest at Mount Kilimanjaro is home to an endemic subspecies of the white-starred robin.

The white-starred robin is a principally found in primary or secondary moist evergreen forest. It needs forest with a good understory of shrubs and vines. It also occupies forest edges, pine and wattle plantations, evergreen woodlands and forest edge gardens. It occasionally is reported in bamboo or heath zones in some mountains. In the northern parts of its range, near the equator, it occurs in mountains between 1,500 and 2,200 m (4,900–7,200 ft) in elevation (sometimes as high as 3,300 m (10,800 ft)), further south in Zimbabwe it seldom occur above 1,300 m (4,300 ft), and in South Africa it can occur at sea level.

The white-starred robin is a partial migrant. This migration is altitudinal, with birds moving to lower altitudes during the winter (April to September), and is much more pronounced in the southern parts of the range. In Malawi birds descend to the shores of lake Malawi (300 m (980 ft)), birds in South Africa and Mozambique move as low as sea-level, and may move 120 km (75 mi) from their breeding sites. In Malawi studies established that the males remained in their breeding territories, while the females moved away during the winter.

== Behaviour ==
=== Voice ===
White-starred robin song
White-starred robin song, recorded in Transvaal, South Africa

The calls and songs of the white-starred robin are geographically variable. Both sexes sing the territorial advertising song, which is a quiet song sung from near the ground. The courtship call is sung during a display flight, and is rendered as a sustained "wiii wii wiii". The loud contact call, also used as a warning call, varies by subspecies. The first type, used by intensa, ruwenzori, guttifer, orientalis and the nominate race, is a disyllabic "too-twii", the second type, used by macarthuri, helleri and transvaalensis is a more complex multisyllabic "ter-whe dada wiiyoo" or "wheh chiiyoo wher-ter-weh techiiyoo".

=== Diet and feeding ===
The white-starred robin feeds principally on insects and fruits. In one study of fecal samples conducted in KwaZulu-Natal in South Africa, beetles, moths and ants predominated in the samples, being found 83%, 58% and 43% of the time respectively. Other remains found included those of spiders, flies, caterpillars, amphipods, true bugs, wasps, grasshoppers and centipedes. The remains of fruit were found in 34% of the samples, with Canthium, Cassipourea, Ficus, Hedychium, Ilex, Kiggelaria and Rhus being found. The species has also been recorded feeding on other species, including snails, termites, mantids and even small frogs (of the genus Arthroleptis).

=== Breeding ===
The white-starred robin is a seasonal breeder, although the exact timing varies across its range. Birds have been recorded breeding or seen in breeding condition in August to May in the DR Congo, August to November in Rwanda. They in all month in East Africa, but with an attitudinal shift insofar as lowland birds prefer the wet season and highland birds breed in the dry season. In Zambia they breed from September to June, but only from September to January in Malawi. In South Africa the breeding season is September to December.

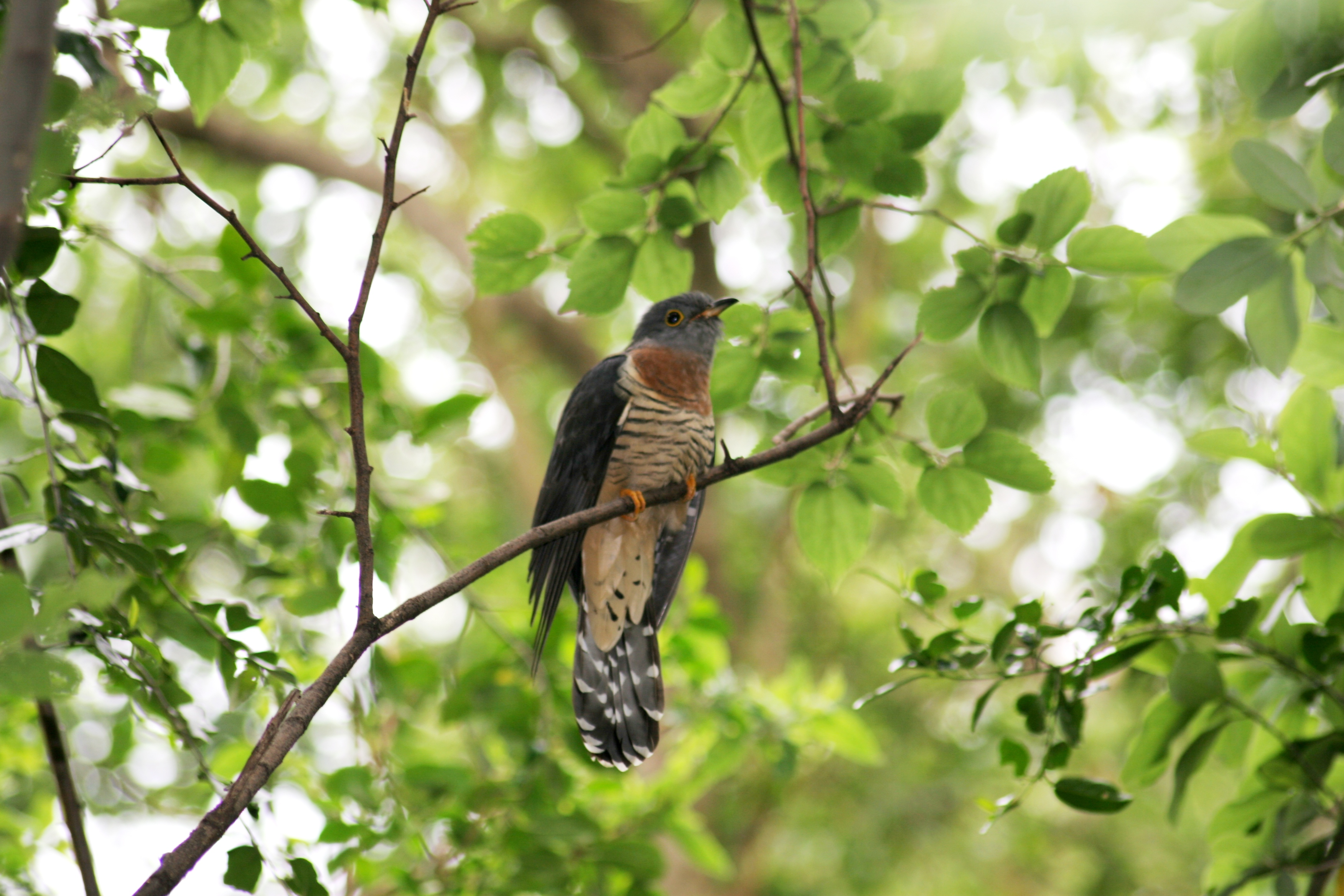
Red-chested cuckoos will parasitise the nests of white-starred robins.

White-starred robins are territorial breeders, with the territories varying in size from 0.5 to 0.75 ha. The nest is unusual for the family in that it is a domed construction, built out of dead leaves, rootlets, moss and tendrils, and lined with leaf skeletons and fine plant material. The nest is well hidden, usually on sloping ground against a trunk or rock, but sometimes off the ground on a rotting trunk rock or earth bank. The nest takes seven days to construct, and is built by the female alone. Between two and three eggs are laid, with two being more common in the tropics and three being typical further south. Eggs are laid on consecutive days with incubation only beginning once the final egg has been laid. Incubation is carried out by the female alone. Incubation lasts between 16 and 18 days, after which chicks fledge around 13 to 15 days after hatching. The chicks remain dependent upon the parents for up to 42 days after hatching.

Nests are raided by small mammals such as shrews and rodents, as well as more rarely by large mammals like civets and monkeys. They are also targeted by brood parasites, principally red-chested cuckoos (six out of 85 nests checked in South Africa) but also other species like African emerald cuckoos.
