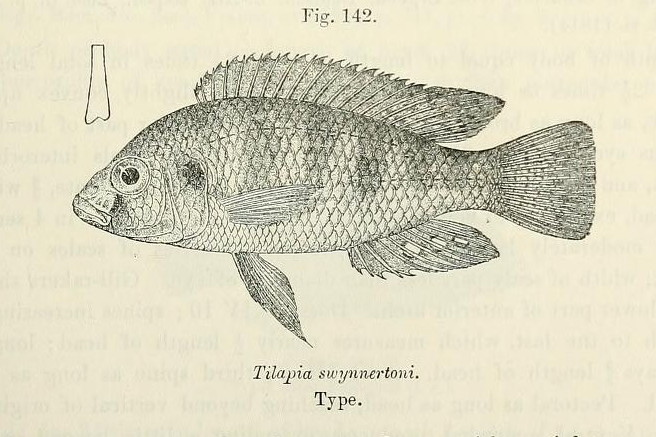

Scientific classification
- Domain: Eukaryota
- Kingdom: Animalia
- Phylum: Chordata
- Class: Actinopterygii
- Order: Cichliformes
- Family: Cichlidae
- Genus: Astatotilapia
- Species: A. swynnertoni

Binomial name
- Astatotilapia swynnertoni Boulenger, 1906

Synonyms
- Tilapia swynnertoni Boulenger, 1907; Haplochromis swynnertoni (Boulenger, 1907)

= Astatotilapia swynnertoni =

Species of fish

Astatotilapia swynnertoni is a species of haplochromine cichlid which is found in the rivers of Mozambique from the Buzi and lower Pungwe rivers south to the Save River. The specific name honours the English naturalist Charles Francis Massy Swynnerton (1877-1938) who discovered the type on his farm in Mozambique.
