= Astatotilapia sp. 'shovelmouth' =

Conservation status
- Endangered (IUCN 2.3)

Scientific classification
- Kingdom: Animalia
- Phylum: Chordata
- Class: Actinopterygii
- Division: Teleostei
- Order: Cichliformes
- Family: Cichlidae
- Tribe: Haplochromini
- Genus: Astatotilapia
- Species: A. sp. 'shovelmouth'

Binomial name
- Astatotilapia sp. 'shovelmouth'

Species of fish

Astatotilapia sp. 'shovelmouth' is a putative, formally undescribed species of freshwater fish in the family Cichlidae. It is endemic to Lake Victoria in Uganda. It was previously included in the IUCN Red List of Threatened Species as an endangered species, but omitted from more recent lists.
