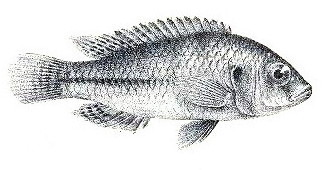

Conservation status
- Data Deficient (IUCN 3.1)

Scientific classification
- Kingdom: Animalia
- Phylum: Chordata
- Class: Actinopterygii
- Order: Cichliformes
- Family: Cichlidae
- Genus: Astatotilapia
- Species: A. bloyeti

Binomial name
- Astatotilapia bloyeti Sauvage, 1883

Synonyms
- Hemichromis bloyeti Sauvage, 1883; Haplochromis bloyeti (Sauvage, 1883); Paratilapia bloyeti (Sauvage, 1883); Tilapia bloyeti (Sauvage, 1883); Ctenochromis strigigena Pfeffer, 1893; Astatotilapia strigigena (Pfeffer, 1893); Chromis strigigena (Pfeffer, 1893); Haplochromis strigigena (Pfeffer, 1893); Tilapia strigigena (Pfeffer, 1893); Tilapia sparsidens Hilgendorf, 1905; Astatotilapia sparsidens (Hilgendorf, 1905); Haplochromis sparsidens (Hilgendorf, 1905); Paratilapia kilossana Steindachner, 1914

= Astatotilapia bloyeti =

Species of fish

Astatotilapia bloyeti is a species of haplochromine cichlid from the coastal river systems of Tanzania. Reports from other areas of Africa are considered to refer to related species. The IUCN considers it to be endemic to the Pangani River and includes Kenya in its range. This species taxonomic status is uncertain and some authorities place it in the genus Haplochromis while others retain it in Astatotilapia. This taxonomic uncertainty has led the IUCN to classify this species conservation status as Data Deficient. The specific name honours the collector of the type, Capitaine A. Bloyet, chief of the French research station at "Kandôa, Tanzania".
