= Haplochromis elegans =

Conservation status
- Least Concern (IUCN 3.1)

Scientific classification
- Kingdom: Animalia
- Phylum: Chordata
- Class: Actinopterygii
- Order: Cichliformes
- Family: Cichlidae
- Genus: Haplochromis
- Species: H. elegans

Binomial name
- Haplochromis elegans Trewavas, 1933

Synonyms
- Astatotilapia elegans (Trewavas, 1933)

Species of fish

Haplochromis elegans is a species of cichlid endemic to Uganda where it occurs in Lake George, Lake Edward and the Kazinga Channel. This species can reach a length of 7.3 centimetres (2.9 in) SL.
