= Astatotilapia tweddlei =

Conservation status
- Data Deficient (IUCN 3.1)

Scientific classification
- Kingdom: Animalia
- Phylum: Chordata
- Class: Actinopterygii
- Order: Cichliformes
- Family: Cichlidae
- Genus: Astatotilapia
- Species: A. tweddlei

Binomial name
- Astatotilapia tweddlei (P. B. N. Jackson, 1985)

Synonyms
- Haplochromis tweddlei Jackson, 1985

Species of fish

Astatotilapia tweddlei is a species of fish in the family Cichlidae. It is found in Malawi and Mozambique. Its natural habitats are rivers and freshwater lakes.

This species was placed in the genus Astatotilapia by FishBase which while stating that the taxonomy is uncertain, Haplochromis is in their view restricted to the rivers and lakes of the drainage basin of Lake Victoria and they tentatively place this species in Astatotilapia. The IUCN state that until further research is undertaken A. tweddlei should be regarded as restricted to Lakes Chilwa and Chiuta and their drainages, as well as probably through the drainage of the Ruvuma River. The specific name honours the fisheries scientist Denis Tweddle of the Malawi Fisheries Research Unit.
