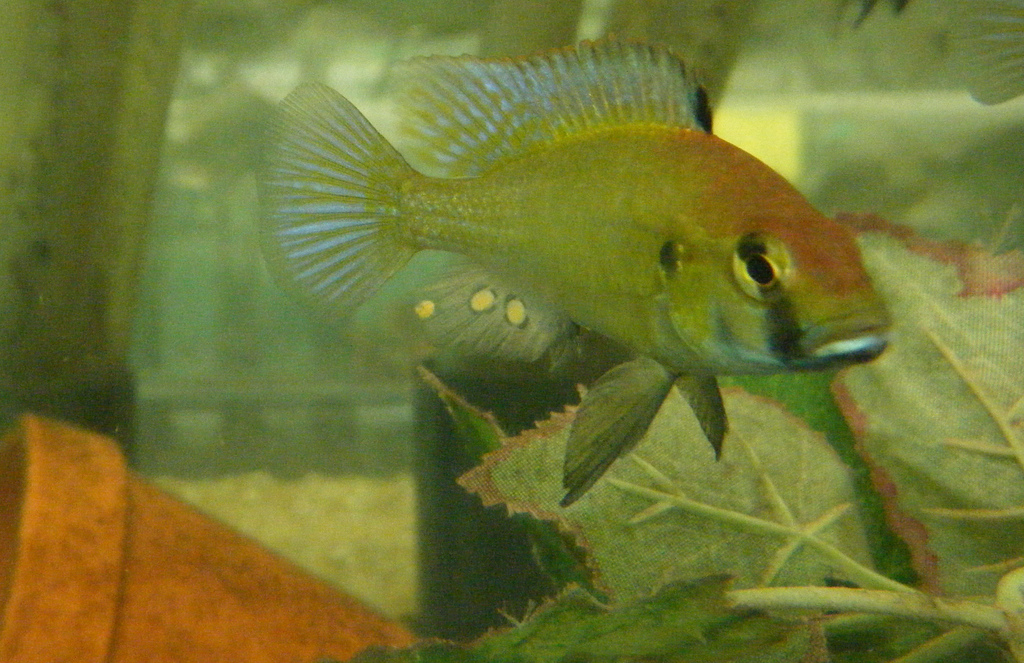

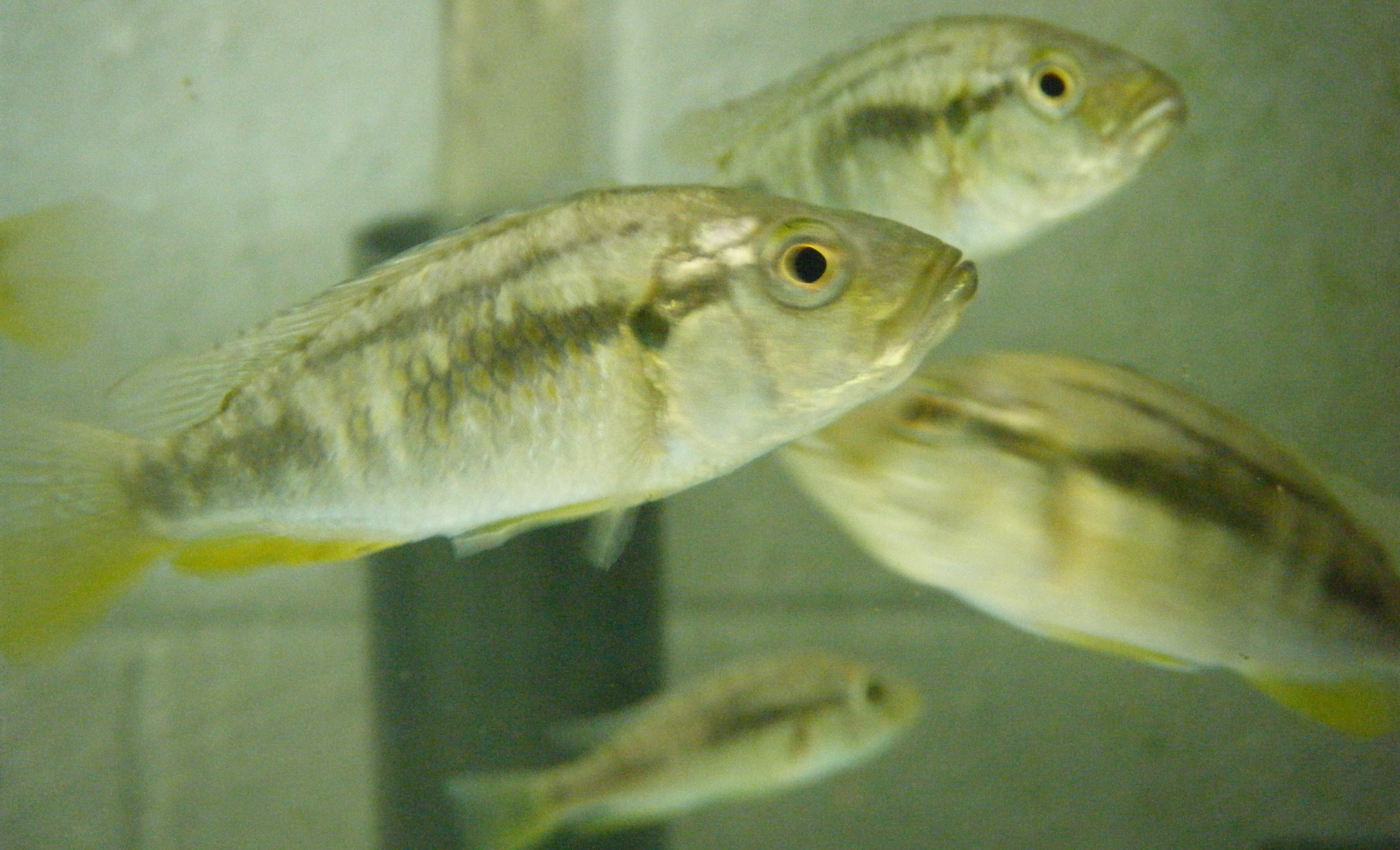
- Male above, females below, all of Lake Chilingali origin

Conservation status
- Least Concern (IUCN 3.1)

Scientific classification
- Kingdom: Animalia
- Phylum: Chordata
- Class: Actinopterygii
- Order: Cichliformes
- Family: Cichlidae
- Genus: Astatotilapia
- Species: A. calliptera

Binomial name
- Astatotilapia calliptera (Günther, 1894)

Synonyms
- Chromis callipterus Günther, 1894; Ctenochromis callipterus (Günther, 1894); Haplochromis callipterus (Günther, 1894); Tilapia calliptera (Günther, 1894); Haplochromis centropristoides Nichols & LaMonte, 1931

= Astatotilapia calliptera =

Species of fish

Astatotilapia calliptera, the eastern happy or eastern river bream, is a species of haplochromine cichlid from southeastern Africa.

== Description ==
The male Astatotilapia calliptera has blue lips and a dark line through its eye. It can show a reddish forehead but the body is normally yellow, although some wild populations are blue. The females are smaller than the males and are brownish silvery in colour. The maximum total length is 15 cm (5.9 in).

== Distribution ==
Astatotilapia calliptera occurs in Lake Malawi and its drainage, the Shire River, and Lakes Chiuta and Chilwa. It has also been recorded from the lower Zambezi River, and in coastal rivers on the coastal plain of Mozambique, from the Rovuma River and south as far as the Save River, This species is established as a non-native, introduced species in Broward County and Palm Beach County in Florida, United States.

== Habitat and ecology ==
Astatotilapia calliptera prefers shallow water with a sand substrate with aquatic vegetation such as species of Vallisneria, where it can be abundant. It is most common in the lower reaches of rivers and weedy flood lagoons. It is an omnivore and much of its diet consists of detritus and phytoplankton; they will also eat invertebrates, algae and smaller fishes.

They are mouthbrooders in which the female lays her eggs on a hard substrate and then they are inseminated by the male before the female takes them into her mouth where they stay for 12-14 days before hatching. The young are then guarded by their mother for a further 5-6 days, using her mouth as a refuge when they perceive danger.

== Aquarium trade ==
Astatotilapia calliptera was one of the first cichlid species found in the aquarium trade. A number of colour varieties are available.
