= St Vincent Whitshed Erskine =

Surveyor General of South Africa (1846-1918)

St Vincent Whitshed Erskine (1846 - 1918), Surveyor General of South Africa, was an early explorer in Gazaland and was the first European to travel down the length of the Limpopo river to its mouth.

== Family ==
Erskine was born on 7 February 1846 in Van Diemen's Land, the second son of Lieutenant Colonel The Honourable David Erskine (son of David Erskine, 2nd Baron Erskine of Restmorel) and his first wife (m. 12 November 1839) Anne Maria Spode, daughter of Josiah Spode and great-granddaughter of Josiah Spode. David Erskine married secondly Emma Florence Mary Harford the daughter of Captain Charles Joseph Harford, 12th Lancers. St Vincent Erskine married in 1870 to Alice Lindley Buchanan 5th daughter of David Dale Buchanan (born 1819, died 4 Sep 1874 in Cape Town), the founder of the "Natal Witness" (The Witness (South African newspaper)) and his wife Mary Ann. St Vincent Erskine and Alice Buchanan had six children:

- Charles Howard Erskine (b. 1871; d. 1918) m. Mildred Charlotte Greathead
- Echo Emmeline Erskine (d. 18 November 1876; bur Commercial Road Cemetery Pietermaritzburg)
- Gyneth Erskine
- Iris Erskine m. Frederic Townsend-Moorland
- Esme Nourse Erskine (b. 1884; d. 1962) m. Elizabeth Susan Matilda Reinders (d. 1972) and had issue Esme Stephenson Erskine and Professor Swanzie Agnew married to Sir Fulque Agnew of Lochnaw Baronet.
- Renira Erskine m. Percy Grant-Dalton

St Vincent Erskine was a friend of Thomas Baines the well known artist of African Exploration, who had accompanied David Livingstone along the Zambezi in 1858.

St Vincent Erskine died from the Spanish flu on 8 July 1918 aged 72 years and is buried in the Maitland Cemetery, Cape Town. Alice Erskine died on 22 October 1922 at Uitenhage, South Africa.

== Explorations in Africa ==
St Vincent Erskine carried out a number of exploratory journeys in Southern Africa between 1868 and 1875 from Natal northwards into Gazaland and down to the mouth of the River Limpopo. Gazaland (modern day Mozambique and Zimbabwe extending northward from the Komati River at Delagoa Bay in Mozambique's Maputo Province to the Pungwe River in central Mozambique) records - “Probably the first European to penetrate any distance inland from the Sofala coast since the Portuguese gold-seekers of the 16th century was St. Vincent W. Erskine, who explored the region between the Limpopo and Pungwe (1868-1875).”

St Vincent Erskine's four journeys are reported in the Journal of the Royal Geographical Society, London:

- Journey of Exploration to the Mouth of the River Limpopo, By St Vincent W Erskine
- Journey to Umzila’s, South East Africa in 1871-1872. By Mr St Vincent Erskine, special Commissioner from the Natal government to Umzila, King of Gasa; and
- Two Journeys of Mr St Vincent Erskine in Gasa Land during the years 1873, 1874 and 1875

== Later career ==
Following his exploratory journeys St Vincent Erskine worked as a surveyor in Natal, the Transvaal and Cape Province. He settled with his family in Cape Town where he died in 1918.

== Source material ==
St Vincent Erskine’s "My journal on the Limpopo River" and Alice Erskine’s diary are lodged with the University of Natal. Extracts from Alice Erskine’s diary can be found in “Buchanan Family Records, James Buchanan and his descendants". She reports the family living in Kokstad, East Griqualand in 1878 where they were attacked by the Griquas who were in rebellion. St Vincent and Alice Erskine both suffered broken legs when the powder magazine exploded. Alice Erskine required to go to England for treatment to save her leg. Having returned from England and lived in Kostad the family moved a year later to Vryheid, describing the rigours of the difficult journey by ox wagon.

Material about St Vincent Erskine is also held by the National Archives of South Africa which include claims for payment of the work; applications to practice as a land surveyor; to be a magistrate at Inanda Division; applications by Alice Erskine for assistance in the education of her children; references to land transactions and to courts cases involving St Vincent etc. and the Royal Geographical Society archives which are mainly manuscripts for his articles, maps and sketches and in the UK National Archives including a letter from Major D Erskine (father of St. Vincent Erskine) dated Dec 22, 1880, to Lord Aberdare, asking support for son's application to be employed on the Transvaal survey[RGS/CB6/742].
