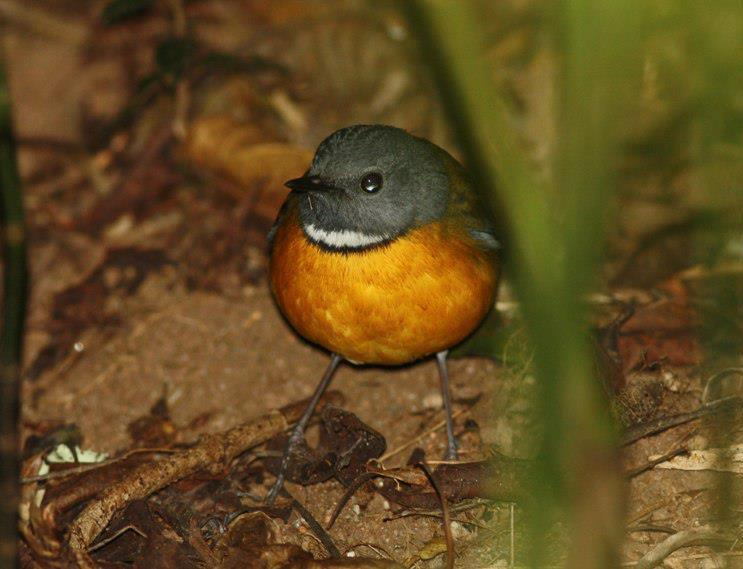

Conservation status
- Near Threatened (IUCN 3.1)

Scientific classification
- Kingdom: Animalia
- Phylum: Chordata
- Class: Aves
- Order: Passeriformes
- Family: Muscicapidae
- Genus: Swynnertonia; Roberts, 1922
- Species: S. swynnertoni

Binomial name
- Swynnertonia swynnertoni (Shelley, 1906)

Synonyms
- Erythracus swynnertoni Shelley, 1906; Pogonocichla swynnertoni (Shelley, 1906)

= Swynnerton's robin =

Species of bird

Swynnerton's robin (Swynnertonia swynnertoni) is a species of passerine bird belonging to the family Muscicapidae. It is monotypic within the genus Swynnertonia. The common and Latin names commemorate the entomologist Charles Swynnerton.

== Taxonomy ==
Swynnerton's robin was first formally described as Erythracus swynnertoni in 1906 by the English geologist and ornithologist George Ernest Shelley. The type specimen was collected in June 1905 in the Chirinda Forest in eastern Rhodesia, modern Zimbabwe. It was thought to be closely related to the white-starred robin (Pogonocichla stellata) so was placed by some authorities in the same genus, Pogonocichla. However, in 1922 Austin Roberts proposed that this taxon was distinctive enough from both the European robin (Erithacus rubecula) and the white-starred robin that it should be classified within its own monospecific genus, Swynnertonia. The genus Swynnertonia is classified within the subfamily Erithacinae of the large passerine family Muscicapidae, the chats and Old World flycatchers. However, it has been argued that the name of this clade should be Cossyphinae, as this was proposed by Vigors in 1825 and so predates Gray's 1846 Erithacinae.

=== Subspecies ===
Swynnerton's robin has two parapatric subspecies:

- Swynnertonia swynnertoni swynnertoni (Shelley, 1906) from the mountains of eastern Zimbabwe and western Mozambique
- Swynnertonia swynnertoni rodgersi Jensen & Stuart, 1982 Udzungwa Mountains, Tanzania

A third subspecies S. s. umbriata was described from Mount Gorongosa in 1974 by Phillip Clancey but this is now regarded as a synonym of the nominate subspecies.

== Etymology ==
Swynnerton's robin honours the British entomologist Charles Swynnerton in its common name, genus name and specific name. Swynnerton discovered the bird before Shelley formally described it. Roberts used the name Melsetter robin for this species, Melsetter being the colonial era name for Chimanimani. The subspecies S. s. rodgersi has a subspecific epithet which honours Dr W. A. Rodgers who drew Jensen and Stuart's attention to the biological importance of the type locality of this form, the Mwanihana Forest.

== Description ==
Swynnerton's robin is superficially similar to the larger White-starred robin, but has a white crescent on the upper breast, which is bordered below with a black line, and its grey tail lacks yellow windows. Its sexually dimorphic plumage is unusual among African robins. The female has duller plumage and an olive wash over the crown and face. Juveniles are spotted buffy yellow on the head and upper parts, while the chest crescent is pale greyish brown. This species has a length of 13 to 14 cm (5.1 to 5.5 in).

=== Vocalisations ===
Swynnerton's robin has a song which has been described as a 3 note whistle, rendered as "zit zitt slurr" or "tsee-tuu-tuu". The third note may be lower in pitch than the preceding 2. The alarm call is a quiet chattering "trrrrrt".

== Distribution and habitat ==
Swynnerton's robin is a localised distribution in eastern and southern Africa. In Tanzania there are two populations, one in the Udzungwa Mountains and another, smaller population, in the East Usambara Mountains. The Tanzanian populations are the subspecies S. s. rodgersi. There are two populations in Mozambique, named as S. s, umbratica by the International Union for Conservation of Nature, on e on Mount Gorongosa and the other on Mount Mabu in the north of the country, this population was discovered in 2008. In Zimbabwe this species is known to occur at the Chirinda Forest Botanical Reserve and a few small forested areas along the border with Mozambique.

This species is almost confined to montane forest between 850 and 1,850 m (2,790 and 6,070 ft) in altitude, except the subpopulation found in the East Usambaras where it likely is found only in lowland evergreen forest at altitudes of 130 to 550 m (430 to 1,800 ft). On Mountt Mabu it has a lower limit of around 1,340 m (4,400 ft) up to the upper limits of the main forest. This species prefers dense undergrowth where there is a high density of saplings, or rank vegetation in the vicinity of streams. In the Bvumba Mountains a 2007 study found Swynnerton's robins between 1,200 and 1,850 m (3,940 and 6,070 ft). It has a strong association with Dracaena fragrans in the Chirinda Forest.

== Biology ==
Swynnerton's robin is largely insectivorous and has been recorded feeding on beetles, wasps, bees, ants, flies, crickets, grasshoppers, spiders and millipedes. It has also been known to eat fruit and even the dwarf squeaker (Arthroleptis xenodactyloides), a small frog. Eggs are laid between October and January, peak egg laying occurring in November and December. The nest is an open cup made of dead leaves, other plant material and mosses, the birds line it with dark fibres that they find at the bases of Cyathea tree ferns. The nest is frequently located at the base of the leaves of Dracaena fragrans trees but may also be placed on a hollow in a stump, on the forked stem of shrubs or on platforms of intertwined liana stems. The clutch consists of 2 or 3 eggs which are only incubated by the females, incubation lasting around two weeks. After hatching the female broods the chicks for between 7 and 9 days, with the male providing them all with food feeding the female first then the young. From about two week the females joins the male in foraging and the chicks fledge at 14 days old, Other than when the adults are attending fledgelings this species is typically found in pairs. During the dry season they will follow columns of Dorylus driver ants, catching insects disturbed by the ants.

== Conservation status ==
Swynnerton's robin has a restricted distribution, within which the extent and quality of its habitat are declining, leading to an increasingly fragmented distribution and probably a declining population. Threats identified include forest clearance and disturbance and non-native invasive species, especially the ginger Hedychium. The International Union for Nature Conservation have therefore classified it as Vulnerable.
