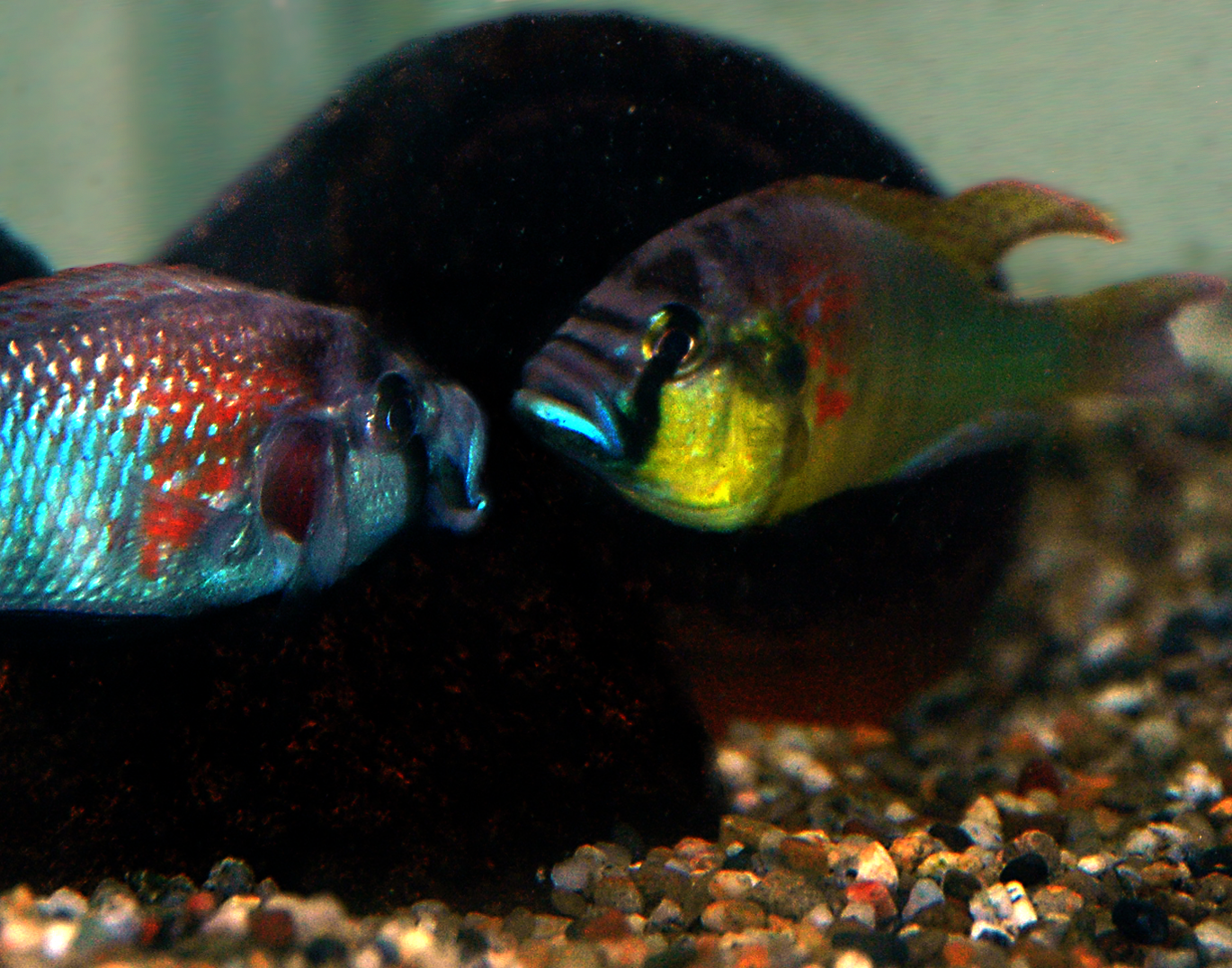
- Two males dispute a territorial boundary.

Conservation status
- Least Concern (IUCN 3.1)

Scientific classification
- Kingdom: Animalia
- Phylum: Chordata
- Class: Actinopterygii
- Order: Cichliformes
- Family: Cichlidae
- Genus: Astatotilapia
- Species: A. burtoni

Binomial name
- Astatotilapia burtoni (Günther, 1894)

Synonyms
- Chromis burtoni Günther, 1894; Haplochromis burtoni (Günther, 1894); Tilapia burtoni (Günther, 1894); Tilapia nadinae Borodin, 1931

= Astatotilapia burtoni =

Species of fish

Astatotilapia burtoni is a species of fish in the family Cichlidae.

It is found in Lake Tanganyika and its surrounding waterways, including parts of Burundi, Rwanda, Tanzania, and Zambia.

Its natural habitats are rivers, intermittent rivers, swamps, freshwater lakes, freshwater marshes, intermittent freshwater marshes, and inland deltas.

Astatotilapia burtoni has been used as a model organism to study the behaviors and physical systems of cichlids, including their development and embryogenesis. Moreover, the phylogenetic position of this particular species makes it an ideal model system for comparative genomic research. A. burtoni belongs under the haplochromines, which is the lineage of cichlids with the most species, and has been discovered to be a sister group to both the Lake Victoria region superflock (which has about 600 species) and the species flock of Lake Malawi (which has about 1,000 species).

== Social behavior ==
=== Reversible male social roles ===
The males of the Astatotilapia burtoni come in two phenotypes that are reversible. The males can readily switch between being territorial and non-territorial based on the social environment they are in: dominant, territorial males possess bright coloration, aggressive behavior while defending territory, and an active role in sexually reproducing with the females; subordinate and non-territorial males possess coloration similar to that of the females, lack initiative to pursue female counterparts, and are reproductively suppressed due to regressed gonads. The transitions between different social roles cause several changes in the brain and reproductive system, such that the social transformation affects them both behaviorally and physically.

To expand on reversibility, if a territorial male is placed with an individual that is significantly larger in size, it will then rapidly socially transform into the non-territorial type. This change can be detected by the behavior and alternate coloration that follows. The change in reproductive competence, however, occurs about three weeks after the formerly territorial male loses its territory to the larger fish. In regards to the other social transition, when a non-territorial male becomes the territorial type, it will almost immediately exhibit aggressive behavior and an eyebar, while the physiological changes will follow in about one week.

==== A result of hormones ====
Several studies have been done in order to pinpoint the biological basis on which this reversal occurs, and they suggest that the stress hormone cortisol may have a direct role in social status, because cortisol may change the biological priorities of the cichlid's system. Under chronic stress, the animal may experience reproductive regression (as shown in the territorial's male shift to the non-territorial type) as a result of the body's efforts to combat the stressor, as opposed to using the metabolic energy for long-term goals like reproduction. Moreover, studies have also shown that the male cichlid's social phenotype directly influences the hormone levels of testosterone and 11-ketotestosterone. Plasma concentrations of these androgens in both the territorial males and non-territorial males were measured and assessed, and it was found that the territorial males have drastically higher plasma concentrations of both hormones.

==== A result of nearby females ====
The cichlid males' behavior of shifting between dominant and subordinate states as a result of the social environment can also be related to females in their vicinity, for females may alternate between reproductive states as well, but independently of social conditions. Females use a complex integration of cues in order to make their mate preferences, which may be from genetic factors, learned behaviors, or hormone levels. They can socially transform between a gravid reproductive state, which is egg-bearing, and a non-gravid reproductive state, and it was shown in a study that the mating preferences of the female highly depended on the reproductive state the female was in. Gravid female cichlids will prefer to spend time with the dominant male type instead of the subordinate male type, whereas the non-gravid females do not have a preference for either one. This may be explained by the fact that for spawning to occur, the gravid females must be courted by the dominant males, suggesting that gravid females' preference for dominant males is a behavioral priming mechanism.

== Reproductive behavior ==
=== Male courtship and maternal mouthbrooding ===
Astatotilapia burtoni, like Oreochromis mossambicus, is a lekking species, so the dominant males will have male displays of courtship in order to attract and lure females that are passing by. Studies have revealed that a male's dorsal fin's color plays a crucial role in attracting females, and that the neural activity in the ventral telencephalon area of the brain is correlated with female preference for males with more vibrant dorsal fins. The behavior starts with the male attempting to catch the female's attention by displaying his side to the female while quivering his body. The males then increase urination rates towards gravid females, which send unidentified pheromones to stimulate ovulation. The male will then try to lead the female back to a spawning site, and if she follows and thus is ready to spawn she will peck at egg-shaped spots on the male's anal fin as he quivers again. The female will then lay her eggs, collect them in her mouth, then peck at the egg spots on the male. The male releases sperm and fertilizes the eggs in the female's mouth. This pecking and fertilizing behavior repeats until the female is done laying eggs.

After spawning, the females will rear the young in their mouths, a behavior called mouthbrooding. After about two weeks of incubation have passed, the females will release their young. However, exposure to excess noise during maternal mouthbrooding can cause cannibalization or premature release of the brood. Following brood release, after several more weeks have passed, the female cichlids will have recovered physiologically enough to be able to spawn again.

Maternal mouthbrooding is recognized to affect hormones and reproductive cycles for the female cichlids, but the effects as a result of neural processing and food deprivation are not known. A study particularly focused on this subject matter examined the effects that maternal mouthbrooding may have on a wide variety of physiological practices, in order to see if they are consequences of food deprivation, and indeed it was found that many of the changes (not all) are explained by food deprivation.

== Communication ==
=== Acoustic signals ===
Many animals use multimodal communication, having multiple sensory modalities at their disposal for reproductive interactions, and the Astatotilapia burtoni has been used as a model to study the production of the wide variety sexual signal types. A. burtoni incorporate multiple sensory systems, including chemosensory, visual, acoustic, to be able to socially interact in their complex manner.

East African cichlids, in general, are especially known for their vibrantly colored bodies and the role that coloration plays in courting and mating, but the A. burtoni is known to be phenotypically distinct in its use of a completely different form of sensory communication: acoustic communication. Sounds and the corresponding behaviors of the male sex of these particular African cichlids have been studied while observing the female mate preference, and behavioral experiments demonstrated that acoustic information does indeed play a significant role in sexual reproduction. This reliance on non-visual sensory information in order to coordinate complex social behaviors indicates that acoustic signaling is important for the A. burtoni. This suggests that there are internal cues in these cichlid fish that can significantly change the way in which the fish respond to auditory signals because the physiological state of the fish can directly affect the perception of the auditory signals. Thus, more efforts have been made to understand how the females perform sexual selection by closely examining the signaling systems and how they relate to the neural processing in the fish to result in such behaviors.

=== Reproductive purpose ===
A particular study showed that dominant males will issue auditory signals in order to court females, and that these courtship sounds are similar to those that they themselves could perceive. The study found that the broadband sounds that the dominant males produced were associated with body quivers, suggesting that the sounds were produced intentionally for courting and not a by-product of the quivers, as not all the quivers were accompanied by sounds. The data also suggested that auditory perception of A. burtoni changes in accordance with the reproductive cycle of the fish. This may be potentially due to levels of circulating hormones. Intra- and inter-sexual social communications in males can also be affected by underwater noise exposure. Noise exposure was even found to change when and how males produced courtship behaviors, such as producing mating calls by quivering inside their spawning shelters instead of near a female. This behavioral change likely decreases the chance of females hearing male mating calls.
