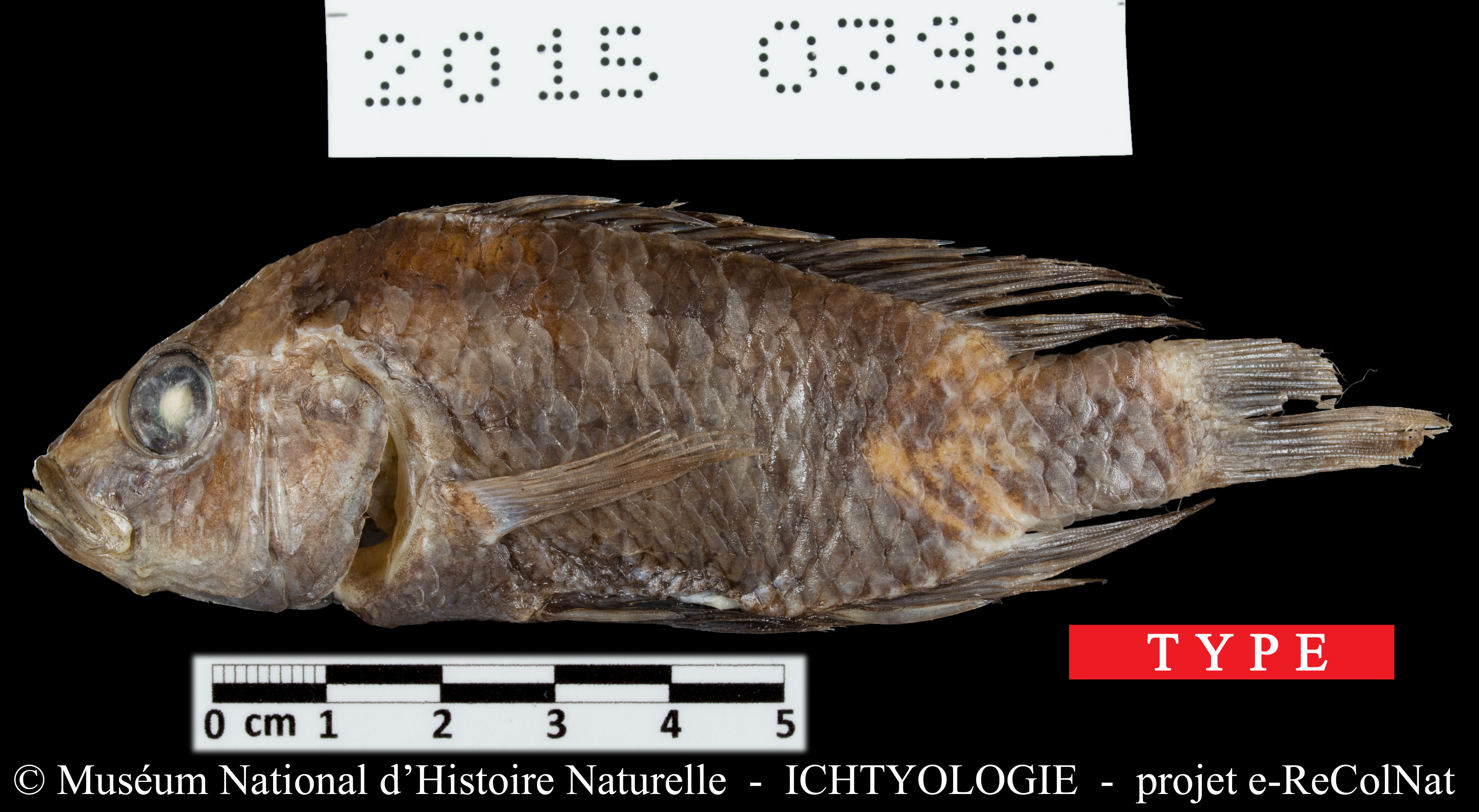

Scientific classification
- Domain: Eukaryota
- Kingdom: Animalia
- Phylum: Chordata
- Class: Actinopterygii
- Order: Cichliformes
- Family: Cichlidae
- Genus: Astatotilapia
- Species: A. tchadensis

Binomial name
- Astatotilapia tchadensis Trape, 2016

= Astatotilapia tchadensis =

Species of fish

Astatotilapia tchadensis is a species of haplochromine cichlid which is found in Chad, Cameroon, Nigeria, Niger and Central African Republic, in Lake Chad and its basin and in Lake Boukou, one of the Lakes of Ounianga in Chad, the type locality.
