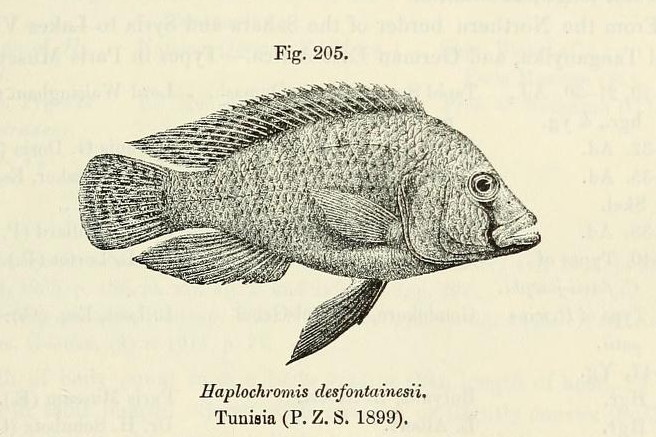

Conservation status
- Critically Endangered (IUCN 3.1)

Scientific classification
- Kingdom: Animalia
- Phylum: Chordata
- Class: Actinopterygii
- Division: Teleostei
- Order: Cichliformes
- Family: Cichlidae
- Genus: Astatotilapia
- Species: A. desfontainii

Binomial name
- Astatotilapia desfontainii (Lacépède, 1802)

Synonyms
- Sparus desfontainii Lacepède, 1802; Chromis desfontainii (Lacepède, 1802); Haplochromis desfontainii (Lacepède, 1802)

= Astatotilapia desfontainii =

Species of fish

Astatotilapia desfontainii is a species of cichlid found in Algeria and Tunisia. It is found in freshwater spring, irrigated land, and canals and ditches. It is threatened by habitat loss. This species reaches a length of 15 centimetres (5.9 in) TL.
