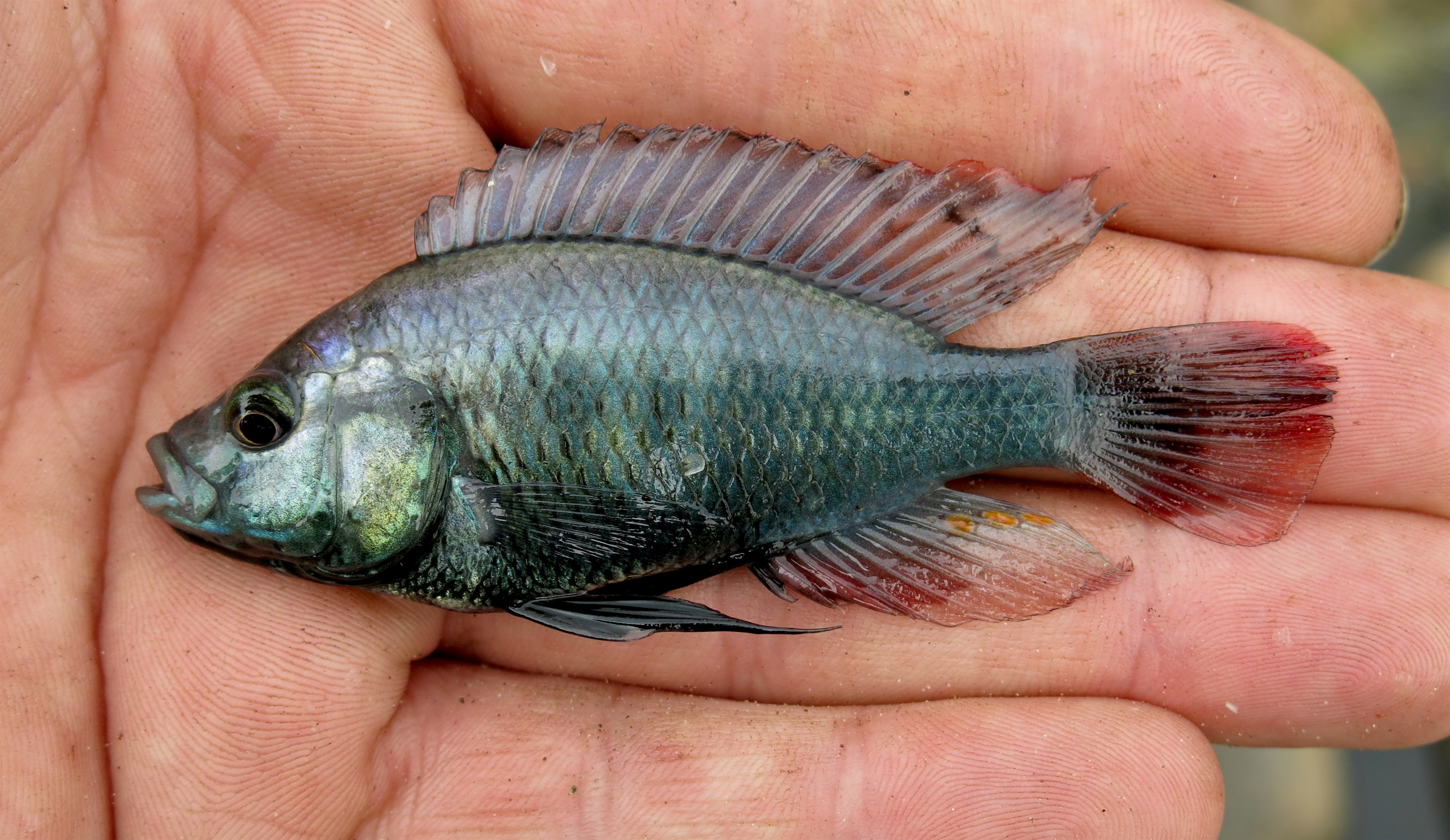
- A. stappersii male caught at Gatumba, Burundi

Conservation status
- Least Concern (IUCN 3.1)

Scientific classification
- Kingdom: Animalia
- Phylum: Chordata
- Class: Actinopterygii
- Order: Cichliformes
- Family: Cichlidae
- Genus: Astatotilapia
- Species: A. stappersii

Binomial name
- Astatotilapia stappersii (Poll, 1943)

Synonyms
- Haplochromis stappersii Poll, 1943

= Astatotilapia stappersii =

Species of fish

Astatotilapia stappersii is a ray-finned fish species in the family Cichlidae. Adults measure about 15 cm (6 inches) in total length.

It is erroneously listed twice in the IUCN Red List, once with a proper entry under its original name Haplochromis stappersii, and once having become mixed up with the synonymy of the Striped Nothobranch (Nothobranchius taeniopygus). It is neither similar nor closely related to that toothcarp, however, apart from both being East African Acanthopterygii. FishBase places the present species in Astatotilapia.

A. stappersii is found in Burundi, the Democratic Republic of the Congo, Tanzania, and Zambia. It inhabits the drainage basin of Lake Tanganyika, except for the Malagarasi River region. Its natural habitats are slow-flowing rivers, swamps, small freshwater lakes and marshes, and inland deltas. It eats mainly aquatic insect larvae.

Its stocks may be adversely affected by habitat destruction and water pollution, and as it is of local commercial importance as food, such a reduction in numbers may lead to overfishing. Overall, however, it is common and widespread, and not considered a threatened species by the IUCN.

The specific name honours the Belgian physiologist and biologist Louis Stappers (1883-1916) who led an expedition to Lake Tanganyika on which he collected the type.
