= Glossina swynnertoni =

Scientific classification
- Domain: Eukaryota
- Kingdom: Animalia
- Phylum: Arthropoda
- Class: Insecta
- Order: Diptera
- Family: Glossinidae
- Genus: Glossina
- Species: G. swynnertoni

Binomial name
- Glossina swynnertoni Austen, 1923
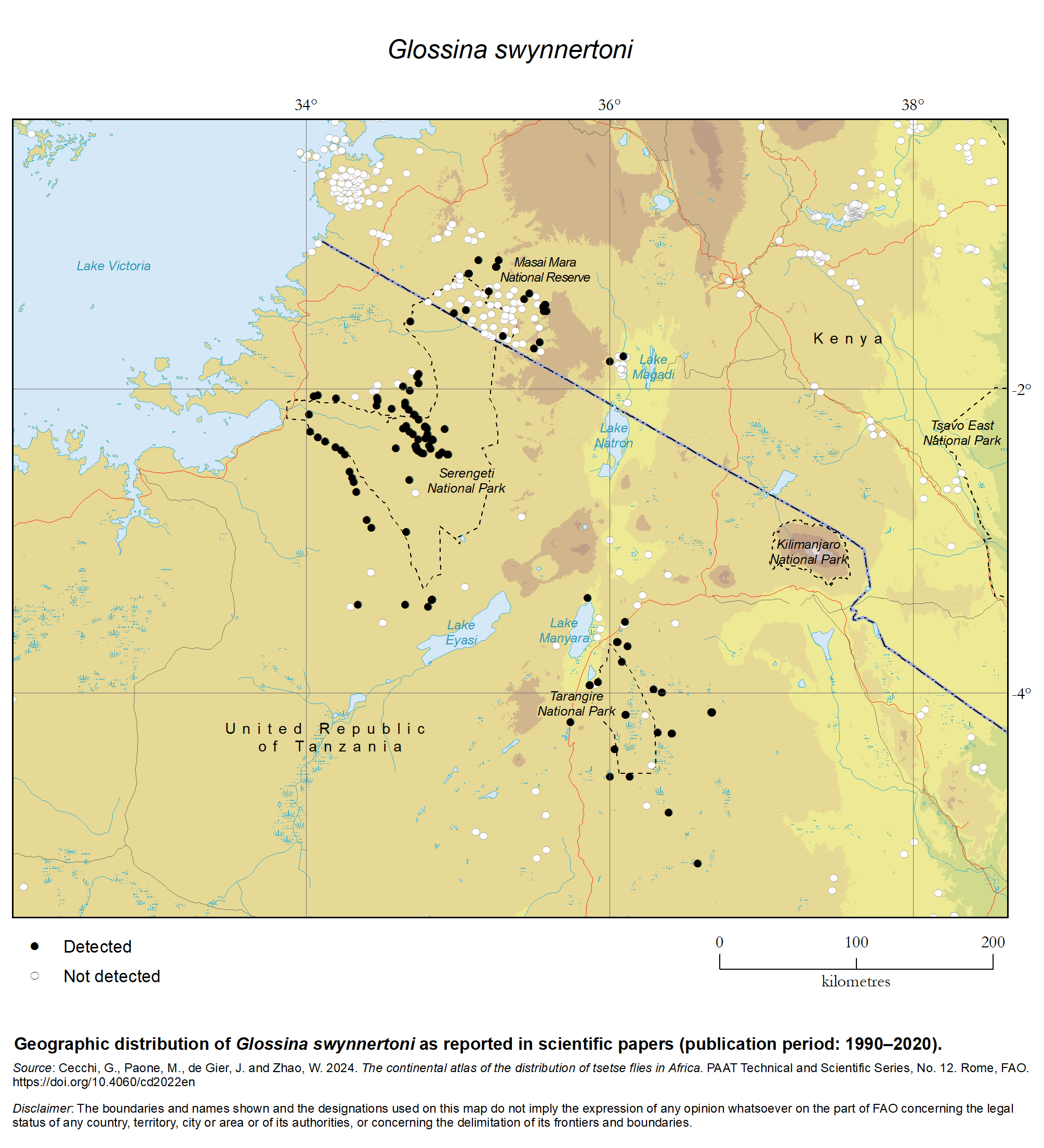
- Geographic distribution of Glossina swynnertoni as reported in scientific papers – Publication period 1990–2020

Species of tsetse fly

Glossina swynnertoni is one of the 23 recognized species of tsetse flies (genus Glossina), and it belongs to the savannah/morsitans group (subgenus Glossina s.s.). Glossina swynnertoni is considered an excellent vector of African trypanosomosis among animals, but it is also involved in the transmission of the human form of the disease.

== Distribution ==
Glossina swynnertoni occurs in relatively small area at the contact of the northern United Republic of Tanzania and southwestern Kenya. National parks or other conservancies are particularly concerned, with the species occurring in the Serengeti National Park and the Tarangire National Park in the United Republic of Tanzania, and in the Maasai Mara National Reserve in Kenya.
