= Manuel António de Sousa =

Manuel António de Sousa Capitâo-Mórda
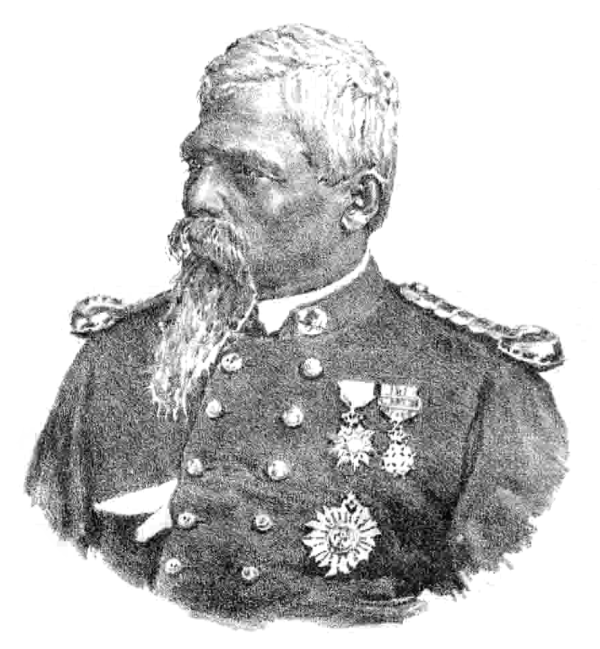
- Manuel António de Sousa
- Born: Manuel António de Sousa; 1835; Mapuçá, Bardês, Portuguese India
- Died: 20 January 1892 (aged 56–57); Portuguese Mozambique
- Spouse: Maria Anastácia Mascarenhas
- Military career
- Allegiance: Portuguese Empire, independent adventurer

Manuel António de Sousa (10 November 1835 - 20 January 1892), also known as Gouveia, was a Portuguese merchant and military captain of Goan origin.

== Biography ==
Manuel António de Sousa was born in Mapuçá, Bardez municipality (Goa) in 1835. He was the son of Félix de Sousa, a landlord and proprietor, and D. Doroteia Tomásia Mascarenhas. He studied at the Rachol Seminary in Salcete, Goa, until the age of 16.

== Migration to Africa ==
In 1853, de Sousa emigrated to Zambézia to assist in the administration of the estate of his uncle Félix Mascarenhas. On his arrival in Portuguese Mozambique, he married his cousin, Maria Anastácia Mascarenhas, the only daughter of his uncle. He became an established businessman in the Sena region, and had a reputation of loyalty to the governor general of Zambézia and to the Kingdom of Portugal . He later became involved in the ivory trade, gaining wealth and power in the region.

He engaged in multiple battles with local chiefs and indigenous kings to expand his influence in the region. In 1856 he took part in the war of succession of the local kingdom of Gaza and settled in the mountains of Gorongosa, where he established the basis of an aringas system which, together with his private army, was used to defend his interests. Armed elephant hunters formed the core of his personal militia.

== Help in battles ==
De Sousa's personal militia helped the Portuguese official forces on several occasions, particularly in campaigns against the Bonga.

In 1863, on account of the services rendered, he succeeded Isidoro Correia Pereira as the chief captain of Manica and Quiteve (Kiteve). During this absence from Sena to receive the commission, his position in Gorongosa was taken by Umzila, the king of Gazaland. De Sousa was later able to retake the region.

== Lord of Manica ==
Around 1874 he was recognized as the Lord of Manica, and married the daughter of the Báruè king. Their son was later recognized as king of that region.

Manuel António de Sousa became a close friend of artillery captain Joaquim Carlos Paiva de Andrada, one of the mentors of the Companhia de Moçambique. A raid in support of the Mutassa chief, on land disputed by Cecil Rhodes's British South African Company, led to them being taken prisoner by the police of that company. Their capture resulted in a diplomatic conflict between the Portuguese and British Empires. The two were eventually released following the intervention of the Portuguese government.

Following his arrest, a rumour surfaced that he had been killed, and this led to unrest among the Báruè population. Gouveia died in combat while trying to re-establish control of Báruè.

== Role in history ==
Malyn Newitt describes Manuel António de Sousa as "a new name ... beginning to be heard in the 1850s" who was to become "in some ways the greatest of the muzungo warlords, but he did not belong to a traditional Zambesian family and cannot strictly be called Afro-Portuguese."

Souza took advantage of the death of Gazaland King Soshangane in 1856, and the subsequent succession dispute, to establish himself in the interior in Gorongosa. Around 1875, says Newitt, "Souza (sic) had by that time become as important a figure as the Gaza king in the politics of the area."

== Tributes ==
On 28 November 1960, a statue of Manuel António de Sousa sculpted by Martins Correia was inaugurated in the north Goa town of Mapuçá, in commemoration of the 125th anniversary of his birth. This statue was destroyed on 15 December 1961 by a bombing just prior to the military action that led to the integration of Goa into India.

== See also ==
- Campaigns of Pacification and Occupation

== Bibliography ==
- GALVÃO, Henrique. Ronda de África. Porto: Editorial "Jornal de Notícias", 1950.
- ANDRADA, Joaquim Carlos Paiva de. Relatório de uma viagem à terra dos landins.. Lisboa: Imprensa Nacional, 1885.
- ANDRADA, Joaquim Carlos Paiva de. Relatório de uma viagem à terra do changamira.. Lisboa: Imprensa Nacional, 1886.
