= Gazaland =

Historical name for a region encompassing Mozambique and Zimbabwe

- Former region
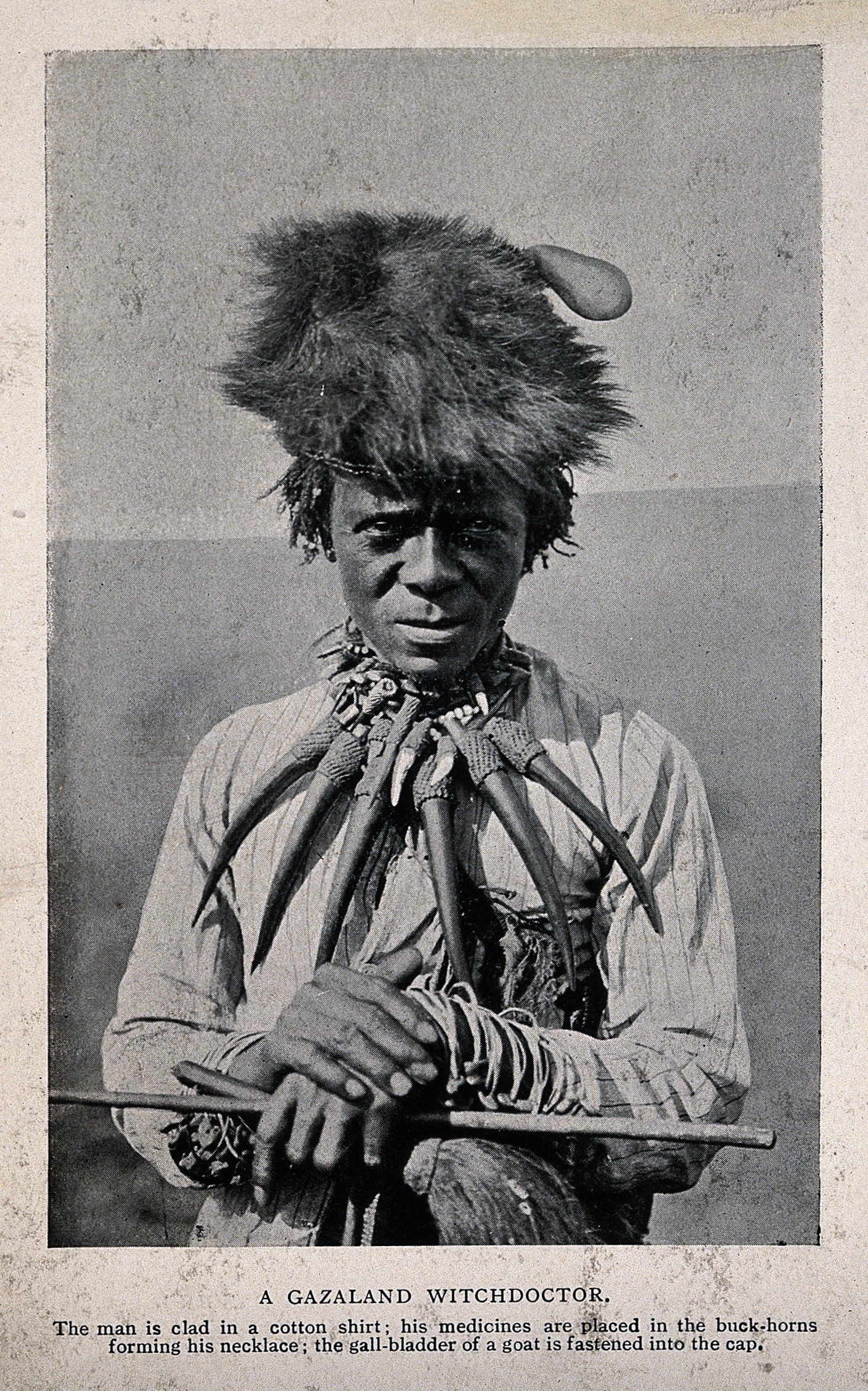
- A Gazaland medicine man or shaman
- Etymology: Chief Gaza (Swazi chief)
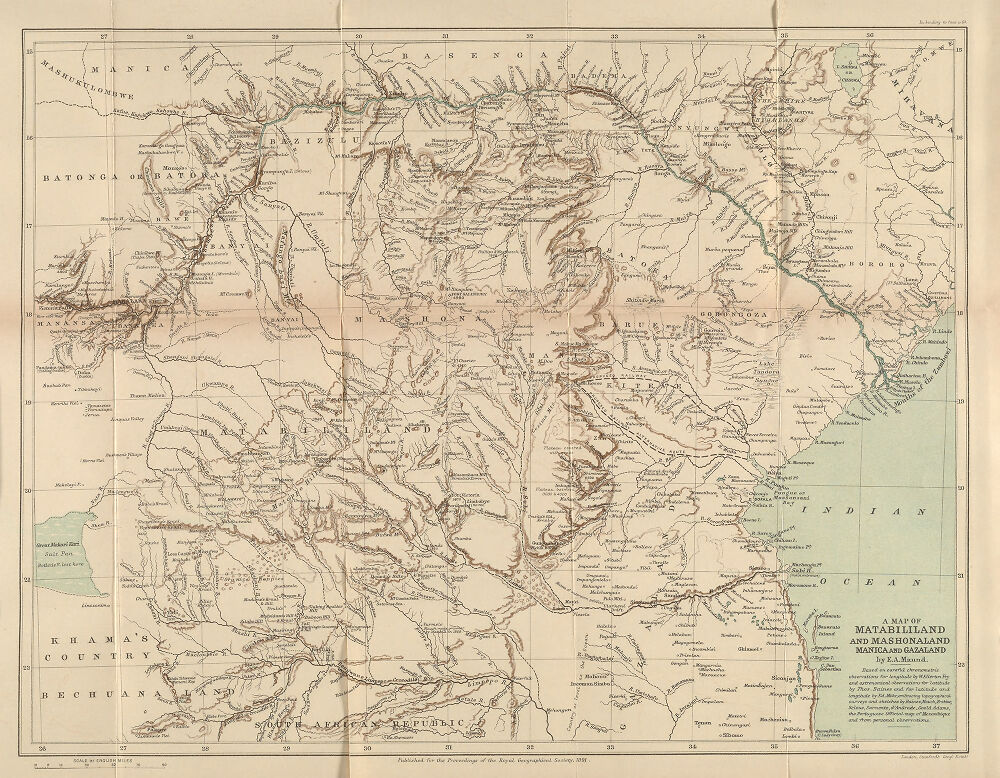
- Map of Gazaland (bottom right), Matabililand, Mashonaland, and Manica (1891)
- Country: Portuguese East Africa

Gazaland is the historical name for the region in southeast Africa, in modern-day Mozambique and Zimbabwe, which extends northward from the Komati River at Delagoa Bay in Mozambique's Maputo Province to the Pungwe River in central Mozambique.

== History ==
It was a district of the former Portuguese East Africa. Its name was derived from a Swazi chief named Gaza, a contemporary of Shaka kaSenzangakhona. It covered most of present-day Gaza and Inhambane provinces, and the southern portions of Manica and Sofala provinces.

Refugees from various clans oppressed by Dingane kaSenzangakhona (Shaka's successor) were welded into one tribe by Gaza's son Soshangane, his followers becoming known as Shangaan or Mashangane. A section of them was called Maviti or Landeens (i.e. couriers), a designation which persisted as a tribal name. Between 1833 and 1836 Soshangane made himself master of the country as far north as the Zambezi and captured the Portuguese posts at Delagoa Bay, Inhambane, Sofala and Sena, killing nearly all the inhabitants.

The Portuguese reoccupied their posts, but held them with great difficulty, while in the interior Soshangane continued his conquests, depopulating large regions. Soshangane died about 1856, and his son Umzila, receiving some help from the Portuguese at Delagoa Bay in a struggle against a brother for the chieftain-ship, ceded to them the territory south of the Komati River. North of that river as far as the Zambezi, and inland to the continental plateau, Umzila established himself in independence, a position he maintained till his death (c .1884). His chief rival was a Goan named Manuel António de Sousa, also known as Gouveia, who came to Africa about 1850. Having obtained possession of a crown estate (prazo) in the Gorongosa District, he ruled there as a feudal lord while acknowledging himself a Portuguese subject. Gouveia captured much of the country in the Zambezi valley from the Shangaan, and was appointed by the Portuguese captain-general of a large region.

== Exploration ==
Probably the first European to penetrate any distance inland from the Sofala coast since the Portuguese gold-seekers of the 16th century was St Vincent Whitshed Erskine, who explored the region between the Limpopo and Pungwe (1868-1875). Portugal's hold on the coast had been more firmly established at the time of Umzila's death, and Gungunyana, his successor, was claimed as a vassal, while efforts were made to open up the interior. This led in 1890-1891 to collisions on the borderland of the plateau with the newly established British South Africa Company, and to the arrest by the company's agents of Gouveia, who was, however, freed and returned to Mozambique via Cape Town. The border between the British and Portuguese colonies was set by the Anglo-Portuguese Treaty of June 11 1891. An offer made by Gungunyana (1891) to come under British protection was not accepted. In 1892 Gouveia was killed in a war with a native chief. Gungunyana maintained his independence until 1895, when he was captured by a Portuguese force and exiled, first to Lisbon and afterwards to the Azores, where he died in 1906. With the capture of Gungunyana opposition to Portuguese rule largely ceased.

== Gold mines ==
In the early 20th century, Gazaland was one of the chief recruiting grounds for laborers in the South African gold mines.

== See also ==
- Gaza Empire
- Gaza Province, Mozambique
- Manicaland, Zimbabwe
- Masvingo, Zimbabwe
